= 1934 Grand Prix season =

Final year of a two-year hiatus for the AIACR European Championship

Seasons
- ← 1933 1935 →

The 1934 Grand Prix season saw the advent of a new GP car Formula with 750 kg upper dry weight (without liquids, tyres and driver) limit in an effort to reduce engine capacity, power and speed, favouring handling and lower costs of nimble cars like the Bugatti Type 51 and Alfa Romeo P3 over big engine sportstourer like the Mercedes-Benz SSK and Bentley Speed Six which had over 6 liter capacity, well over 200 hp, and were twice as heavy and very fast in straight line circuits like Le Mans. Superchargers, used in many race cars already for a decade, were permitted.

To curb the danger of rising speeds, the Association Internationale des Automobile Clubs Reconnus (AIACR), the precursor to the Fédération Internationale de l'Automobile (FIA), imposed this weight limit, believing that it effectively outlawed the large-capacity engines without actually setting a limit, allowing for development. The incumbent manufacturers Alfa Romeo, Maserati, and Bugatti had been preparing their new models with varying success – the best of which was the Alfa Romeo Tipo B. However, it was the state-sponsored arrival of the two German teams, Mercedes-Benz and Auto Union, and their innovative and progressive cars that ignited a new era of motor racing that had begun in the early 1920s, when Benz adopted the rear mid-engine, rear-wheel-drive layout and racers designed by Ferdinand that used superchargers.

Their cars started at around 3 litres and 300 hp and gained around a litre and 100 hp each year until the engine size was limited to 3 litres after 1937.

Scuderia Ferrari, running the Alfa Romeos, won the 1934 Monaco Grand Prix on the twisty city circuit with their new signing, the young Franco-Algerian Guy Moll. Then, in a special, aerodynamic Alfa Romeo, he won the Avusrennen on the mostly straight line track in Berlin that saw the first appearance of Auto Union A. His team-leader Louis Chiron had crashed out of the lead at Monaco, but took victory in the French Grand Prix. The German cars were fast but prone to new-car unreliability; however, Hans Stuck was able to claim Auto Union's first victory at their home Grand Prix. A controversial Customs decision kept the German teams out of the 1934 Belgian Grand Prix but they were back with a vengeance in the second half of the season. It started tragically with Faglioli's win at Pescara when Moll was killed closing in on the lead. Mercedes-Benz W25 cars went on to win the Italian and Spanish races, while Auto Union won the inaugural 1934 Swiss Grand Prix at the new Bremgarten circuit.

This was one of the major watershed racing seasons, that saw one of the most abrupt shifts between the old and new regimes as the balance-of-power in European racing moved from Italy to Germany. France was a distant third, while Britain only built cars for smaller classes like Voiturette.

== Grand Épreuves ==
	Date	Name	Circuit	Race Regulations	Weather	Race Distance	Winner's Time	Winning driver	Winning constructor	Fastest lap	Report
1	2 Apr	VI Grand Prix de Monaco	Monte Carlo	AIACR	sunny	320 km	3h 32m	(French Algeria) Guy Moll	Alfa Romeo Tipo B	Carlo Felice Trossi; Alfa Romeo	Report
	30 May	(United States) XXII International 500 Mile; Sweepstakes	Indianapolis	AAA	sunny	500 miles	4h 46m	(United States) Bill Cummings	Miller FD	not recorded	Report
2	1 Jul	(France) XXVIII Grand Prix de l’ACF	Montlhéry	AIACR	hot	500 km	3h 39m	(Monaco) Louis Chiron	Alfa Romeo Tipo B	Louis Chiron; Alfa Romeo	Report
3	15 Jul	(Germany) VII Grosser Preis von Deutschland	Nürburgring	AIACR	overcast	570 km	4h 38m	(Germany) Hans Stuck	Auto Union Type A	Hans Stuck; Auto Union	Report
4	29 Jul	(Belgium) V Grand Prix de Belgique	Spa-Francorchamps	AIACR	rain	360 km	4h 15m	(France) René Dreyfus	Bugatti Type 59	Antonio Brivio; Bugatti	Report
	1 Sep	(United Kingdom) XIII RAC Tourist Trophy	Ards-Belfast	sports, handicap		480 miles	6h 13m	(United Kingdom) Charles Dodson	MG NE Magnette	Eddie Hall; Bentley	Report
5	9 Sep	(Italy) XII Gran Premio d’Italia	Monza	AIACR	hot	500 km	4h 46m	(Germany) Rudolf Caracciola (Italy) Luigi Fagioli	Mercedes-Benz W25	Hans Stuck; Auto Union	Report
6	23 Sep	(Spain) IX Gran Premio de España	Lasarte	AIACR	sunny	520 km	3h 20m	(Italy) Luigi Fagioli	Mercedes-Benz W25	Hans Stuck; Auto Union	Report

A pink background indicates the race was run for Sports Cars or Touring Cars this year, while a grey background indicates the race was not held this year. Sources:

== Major Races ==
Multiple classes are mentioned when they were divided and run to different race lengths.

	Date	Name	Circuit	Race Regulations	Weather	Race Distance	Winner's Time	Winning driver	Winning constructor	Report
	18 Feb	(Sweden) I Vallentunaloppet	Vallentunasjön	Formula Libre	sunny	40 km	20m	(Germany) Paul Pietsch	Alfa Romeo 8C 2300 Monza	Report
	18 Feb	(France) Grand Prix de Pau	Pau					cancelled		
	25 Feb	(Sweden) Sveriges Vinter Grand Prix	Lake Rämen					cancelled		
	25 Feb	(Norway) I Norges Grand Prix (III Mjøsløpet)	Lake Mjøsa, Lillehammer	Formula Libre		150 km	1h 20m	(Sweden) Per-Viktor Widengren	Alfa Romeo 8C 2300 Monza	Report
	19 Mar	(Australia) VII Australian Grand Prix	Phillip Island	Formula Libre handicap	sunny	200 miles	3h 12m	(Australia) Bob Lea-Wright	Singer Nine	Report
	22 Apr	(Italy) X Circuito di Alessandria (Circuito Pietro Bordino)	Alessandria	Formula Libre, heats	heavy rain	120 km	53m	(Italy) Achille Varzi	Alfa Romeo Tipo B	Report
	29 Apr	(French protectorate of Tunisia) Grand Prix de Tunisie	Carthage					cancelled		
A	6 May	(Libya) VIII Gran Premio di Tripoli (II Lotteria di Tripoli)	Mellaha	Formula Libre	sunny	525 km	2h 49m	(Italy) Achille Varzi	Alfa Romeo Tipo B	Report
	13 May	(Finland) III Eläintarhanajot (Djurgårdsloppet)	Eläintarharata	Formula Libre	overcast	100 km	59m	(Norway) Eugen Bjørnstad	Alfa Romeo 8C 2300 Monza	Report
	20 May	(Italy) XXV Targa Florio	Piccolo Madonie	Targa Florio	heavy rain	430 km	6h 14m	(Italy) Achille Varzi	Alfa Romeo Tipo B	Report
	20 May	(Belgium) IX Grand Prix des Frontières	Chimay	Formula Libre		160 km	1h 23m	(Belgium) Willy Longueville	Bugatti Type 35B	Report
	20 May	(Morocco) III Grand Prix de Casablanca / (Grand Prix du Maroc)	Anfa Circuit	Formula Libre	hot	380 km	2h 56m	(Monaco) Louis Chiron	Alfa Romeo Tipo B	Report
	20 May	(France) Grand Prix de Nîmes	Nîmes					cancelled		
	21 May	(Kingdom of Hungary) Budapest Grand Prix	Népliget Park					cancelled		
B	27 May	(Germany) IV Internationales Avusrennen	AVUS	Formula Libre; Voiturette	rain then overcast	290 km	1h 26m	(French Algeria) Guy Moll	Alfa Romeo Tipo B streamliner	Report
	27 May	(France) X Grand Prix de Picardie	Péronne	Formula Libre	sunny	200 km	1h 32m	(France) Benoît Falchetto	Maserati 8CM	Report
	2 Jun / (14 Jun)	(United Kingdom) II Mannin Moar	Douglas	Formula Libre	hot	180 miles	2h 26m	(United Kingdom) Brian Lewis, Baron Essendon	Alfa Romeo Tipo B	Report
C	3 Jun	(Germany) XII Eifelrennen	Nürburgring	Formula Libre; Voiturette	overcast	340 km	2h 48m	(Germany) Manfred von Brauchitsch	Mercedes-Benz W25	Report
	3 Jun	(Switzerland) Grand Prix de Montreaux	Montreux	AIACR	sunny	105 km	2h 57m	(Italy) Conde Carlo Felice Trossi	Alfa Romeo Tipo B	Report
	5 Jun	(Poland) Grand Prix Lwowa (Großer Preis von Lemberg)	Lviv					cancelled		
	17 Jun	(Spain) IV Gran Premio de Penya Rhin	Montjuïc Park	Formula Libre	sunny	270 km	2h 33m	(Italy) Achille Varzi	Alfa Romeo Tipo B	Report
	24 Jun	(Italy) Gran Premio di Monza	Monza					cancelled		
	24 Jun	(France) Grand Prix de Lorraine	Seichamps					cancelled		
D	8 Jul	(France) IX Grand Prix de la Marne	Reims-Gueux	Formula Libre	hot	500 km	3h 26m	(Monaco) Louis Chiron	Alfa Romeo Tipo B	Report
	15 Jul	(France) Grand Prix de Vichy	Vichy	Formula Libre, heats	rain then overcast	140 km	1h 46m	(Italy) Conde Carlo Felice Trossi	Alfa Romeo Tipo B	Report
	22 Jul	(Italy) VIII Coppa Ciano	Montenero	Formula Libre; Voiturette	sunny	240 km	2h 50m	(Italy) Achille Varzi	Alfa Romeo Tipo B	Report
	22 Jul	(France) II Grand Prix de l'Albigeois	Les Planques, Albi	Formula Libre		270 km	1h 52m	(United Kingdom) Rupert "Buddy" Featherstonhaugh	Maserati Tipo 26M	Report
	22 Jul	(France) VI Grand Prix de Dieppe	Dieppe	Formula Libre, heats	sunny	242 km (winner)	2 hours	(France) Philippe Étancelin	Maserati 8CM	Report
	5 Aug	(Sweden) Sveriges Sommer Grand Prix	Norra Vram					cancelled		
	5 Aug	(Luxembourg) Grosser Preis von Luxemburg						cancelled		
	12 Aug	(France) Grand Prix de la Baule	La Baule beach					cancelled		
E	15 Aug	(Italy) X Coppa Acerbo	Pescara	Formula Libre	rain	520 km	3h 59m	(Italy) Luigi Fagioli	Mercedes-Benz W25	Report
	19 Aug	(France) III Grand Prix de Nice	Nice	Formula Libre	hot	320 km	3h 02m	(Italy) Achille Varzi	Alfa Romeo Tipo B	Report
	19 Aug	(France) Grand Prix de Marseille	Miramas					cancelled		
F	26 Aug	(Switzerland) I Grosser Preis der Schweiz	Bremgarten	Formula Libre	sunny	510 km	3h 38m	(Germany) Hans Stuck	Auto Union Type A	Report
	26 Aug	(France) X Grand Prix du Comminges	Saint-Gaudens	Formula Libre	sunny	390 km	2h 41m	(Italy) Gianfranco Comotti	Alfa Romeo Tipo B	Report
	2 Sep	(Italy) Circuito di Biella	Biella	Formula Libre, heats	sunny	90 km	1h 03m	(Italy) Conde Carlo Felice Trossi	Alfa Romeo Tipo B	Report
	9 Sep	(France) I Grand Prix de l’UMF	Montlhéry	Formula Libre; Voiturette	?	90 km	39mins	(France) Benoît Falchetto	Maserati 8CM	Report
G	30 Sep	(Czechoslovakia) V Masarykuv Okruh	Masaryk-Ring, Brno	Formula Libre	hot	500 km	3h 53m	(Germany) Hans Stuck	Auto Union Type A	Report
	3 Oct	(Brazil) II Grande Prêmio da Cidade de Rio de Janeiro	Gávea	Formula Libre	sunny	280 km	3h 56m	(Brazil) Irineu Corrêa	Ford Special	Report
	6 Oct	(United Kingdom) II Donington Park Trophy	Donington Park	Formula Libre	rain	85 km	46mins	(United States) / (United Kingdom) Whitney Straight	Maserati 8CM	Report
	14 Oct	(Italy) III Circuito di Modena	Modena	Formula Libre	overcast	130 km	1h 11m	(Italy) Tazio Nuvolari	Maserati 6C-34	Report
	21 Oct	(Italy) Coppa Principessa di Piemonte	Posillipo	Formula Libre, heats	rain	200 km	2h 10m	(Italy) Tazio Nuvolari	Maserati 6C-34	Report
	28 Oct	(French Algeria) IV Grand Prix d'Algérie	Bouzaréah, Algiers	Formula Libre, heats	hot	120 km	2h 28m	(France) Jean-Pierre Wimille	Bugatti Type 59	Report
	27 Dec	(South Africa) I South African Grand Prix (Border 100)	Prince George Circuit	Formula Libre, handicap	sunny	95 miles	?	(United States) / (United Kingdom) Whitney Straight	Maserati 8CM	Report

== Regulations ==
The 1934 season was a landmark year, which saw the introduction of the new 750 kg formula. The trend to now from the manufacturers had been to build bigger engines to get more power. So it was seen as the way to limit increasing speeds because the bigger engines and superchargers would weigh more. It effectively outlawed the Italian twin-engine models. However, it underestimated the advances made in metallurgy and using lightweight materials. The regulations stipulated a maximum weight of 750 kg, calculated excluding the driver, fluids and tyres. The minimum width, at the driver's seat, had to be 850mm. There was no restriction on the choice of fuel that could be used. In the USA the | AAA, facing the same issues, chose a fuel-consumption formula instead – 45 US gallons for the Indianapolis 500.

The AIACR also stipulated that their Grand Épreuves had to run for a minimum of 500 km. They also formally recognised the voiturette class, with a 1.5-litre maximum. However, the revived interest in Grand Prix racing by both manufacturers and spectators saw the smaller category slip back into the shadow. This would later change as it got more expensive to be competitive and privateers retreated back to the smaller class.

=== Technical Innovation ===
The three incumbent manufacturers in Gran Prix racing: Alfa Romeo, Maserati and Bugatti already had racing models close to the required weights, and those required only minor modification to conform to the regulations. Two additional manufacturers, from Germany, had shown intent to develop cars for the new formula. Mercedes-Benz had, of late, been more involved with sports-car racing with the powerful SSK while Auto Union was an unknown quantity. Both had been building and testing new grand prix cars in the previous year. The new German regime saw value in promoting motor-racing to the public and allocated RM450,000, split equally between the companies, to subsidise their development. Additional victory bonuses (20000, 10000, 5000) would be given for podium finishes. However, both companies estimated that the subsidies only covered about 10-20% of their total annual costs. Alfa Romeo, having been recently nationalised under the Istituto per la Ricostruzione Industriale (IRI), was also able to draw on national funding indirectly, albeit to a lesser extent. Unlike Hitler, Mussolini was an avid motor-racing fan and very knowledgeable.

The Tipo B was still the dominant car in racing and this year had a more powerful 2.9-litre engine fitted. In October 1933, Alfa Romeo had announced it would build 25 further cars for private sale, and orders quickly came in. But soon after, the company changed its mind leaving the drivers to soldier on with the increasingly obsolete 2.3-litre Monza.

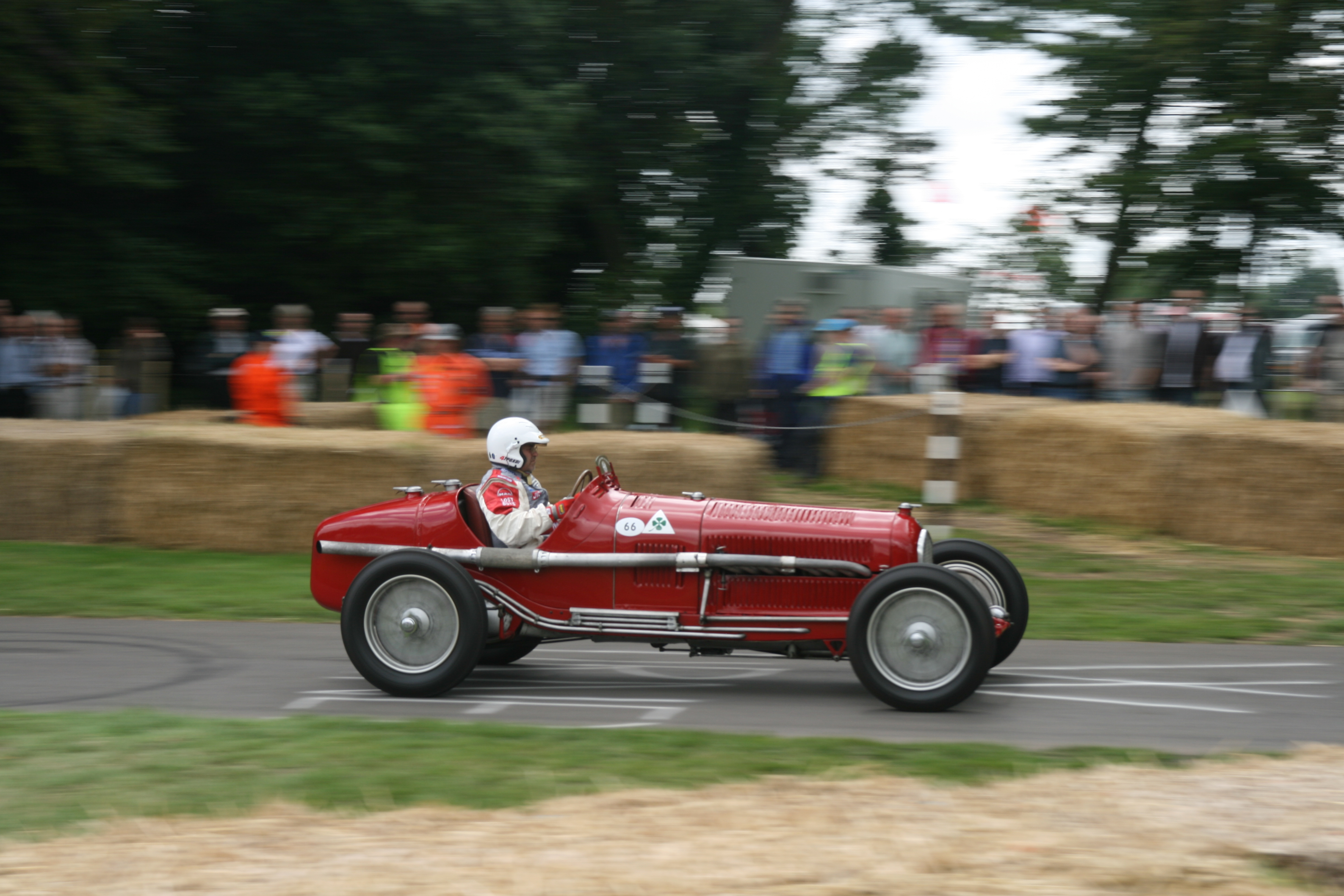
Alfa Romeo Tipo B

Maserati had been the first manufacturer to unveil its model for the new formula. In 1934, the 3.0-litre 8CM monoposto was widened to meet the new regulations' minimum-width requirements. It was very fast but had proven very difficult to handle. Later in the season a new model appeared, the 6C-34, with a new 6-cylinder engine that could develop 260 bhp. Bugatti had finally raced its new Type 59 at the very end of the 1933 season. The debut was quite anti-climactic with it found to be underpowered. In the close-season it was refitted with a 3.3-litre engine and better things were hoped for it. However, further disappointing results against the new German cars stopped further development and Bugatti instead turned its attention to sports cars and the voiturette class. However, even there, the 1.5-litre Type 51A was now being outclassed by the Maseratis and British MGs.

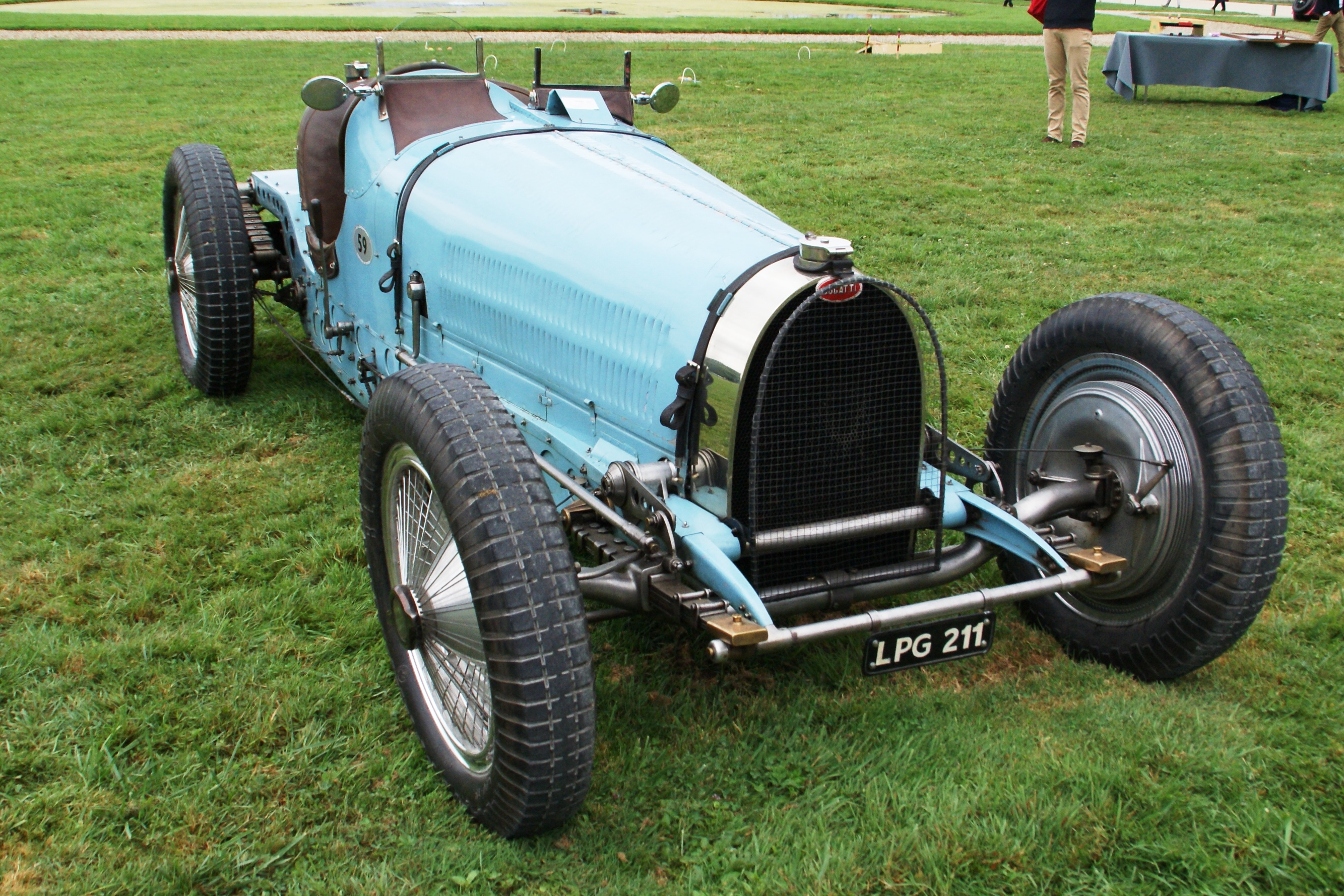
Bugatti Type 59

However, the cars to beat were the two German cars, which both made sensational debuts. The radical Auto Union Type A (also known as the "P-Wagen") had been designed by Dr Ferdinand Porsche. Taking inspiration from the Benz Tropfenwagen of the mid-20s, the mid-mounted, supercharged V16 engine behind the driver put out an impressive 295 bhp. The driver sat almost over the front axle with the fuel tank right behind him. With the radiator at the front, coolant was channelled to the engine through the hollow frame tubing. Porsche's philosophy was to have a large-capacity motor with a moderate compression ratio to give great low-speed torque. The nature of the mid-engine design gave it fiendish understeer that challenged even the best drivers. In March, Hans Stuck set new world records with it for distance covered in one hour, 100 miles and 200 kilometres. Initially of 4360cc, later in the season it was bored out to 4950cc to put out 375 bhp. Mercedes' entry was the W25, designed by Dr Hans Nibel. The supercharged 8-cylinder 3360cc engine had a twin-overhead camshafts, four valves per cylinder and put out 350 bhp exceeding the significant 100 bhp per litre mark. A press-release from Mercedes-Benz in March described the W25 as a “silvery arrow”.

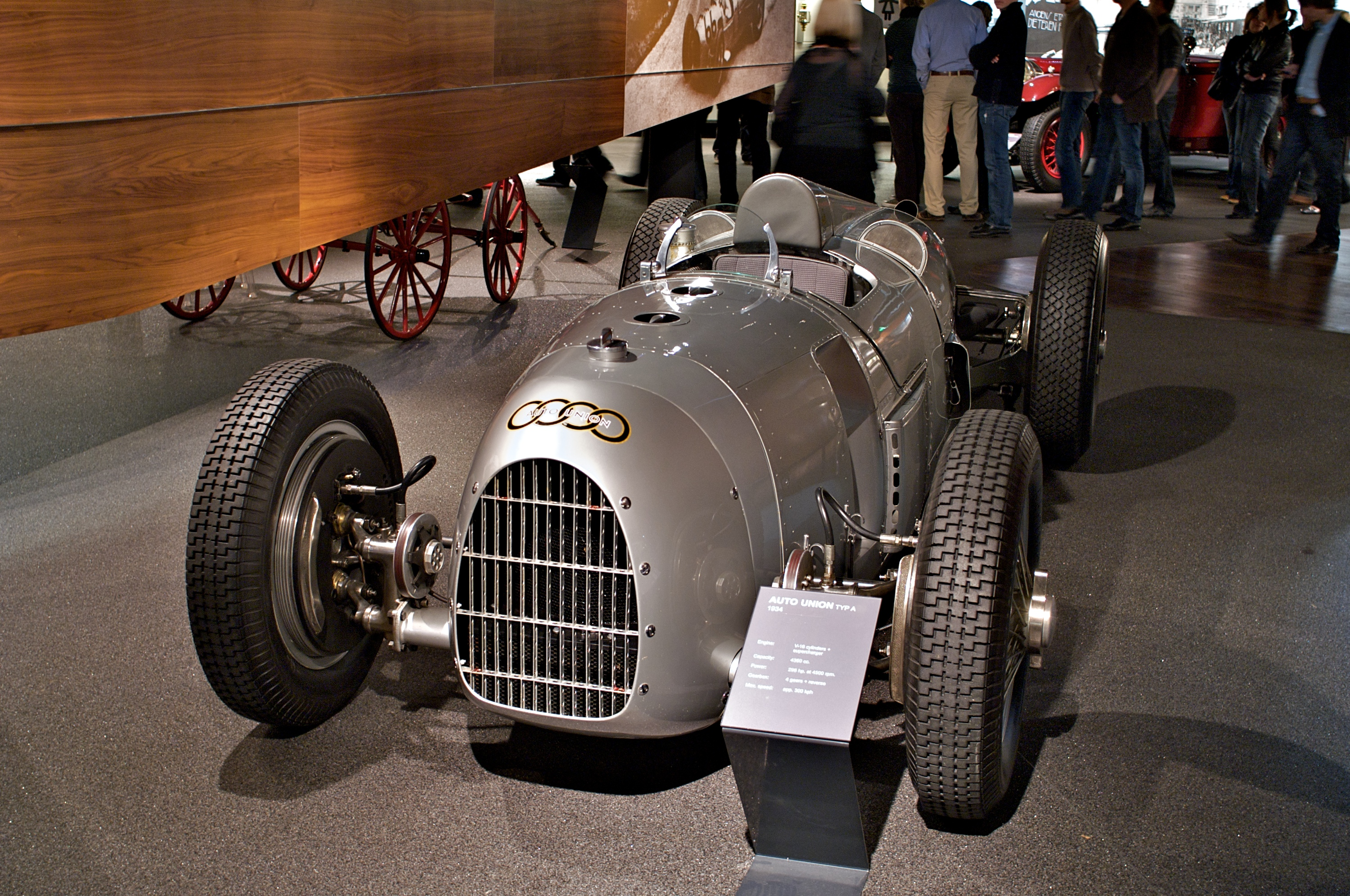
Auto Union Type A

Both designs were built using lightweight tubular frames (drilled out to save further weight) and had independent suspension on all four wheels. This was a first for grand prix cars, in complete contrast to the flexible chassis and rigid axle designs of the opposition that had not changed for a decade. The German advances gave far better traction and better cornering although drivers did find them quite a handful to control on bumpy street circuits. They also used special, exotic fuel mixtures developed by oil and chemical companies. It was not unusual for people near their pits to complain of headaches, nausea and respiratory problems. The fumes smelled of burnt almonds from the ricinus oil (castor oil) additive. Composed mainly of methanol, they barely gave 1mpg fuel economy.

Great Britain was making tentative steps back into grand prix racing. English Racing Automobiles (ERA) had only been formed in November the previous year. The first car was ready six months later, a 1.5-litre voiturette that raced at Brooklands. Two further chassis, with a 1.1-litre and a 2-litre engine, were also built. Company owner, and former racer, Raymond Mays used the latter to set a new record for the standing-start kilometre and prospects looked bright for the next season.

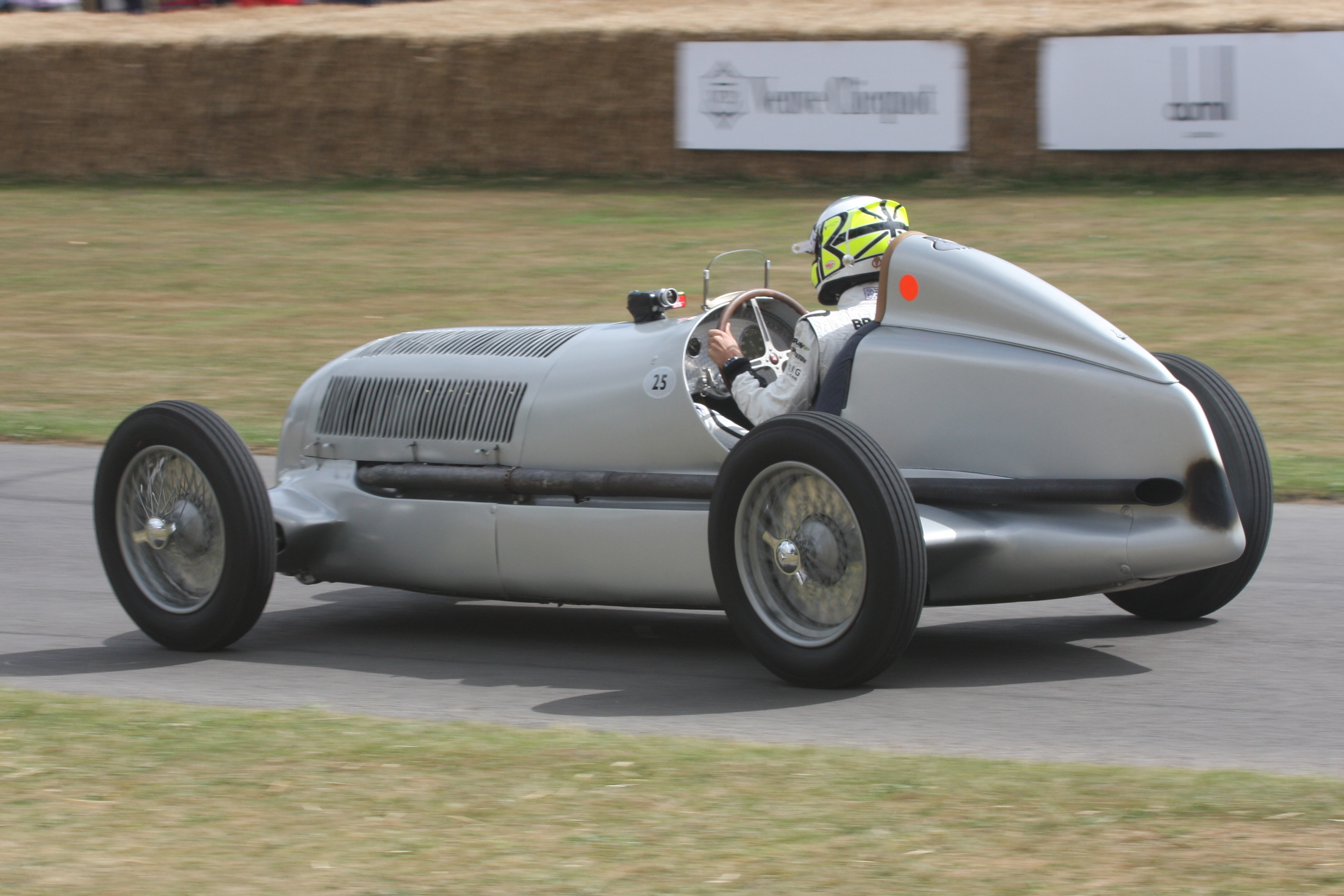
Mercedes-Benz W25

Manufacturer	Model	Engine	Power Output	Max. Speed (km/h)	Dry Weight (kg)
(Italy) Alfa Romeo	Tipo B	Alfa Romeo 2.9L S8 twin-supercharged	255 bhp	260	750
(France) Bugatti	Type 59	Bugatti 3.25L S8 supercharged	240 bhp	245	750
(Italy) Maserati	8CM	Maserati 3.0L S8 supercharged	240 bhp	250	750
(Italy) Maserati	6C-34	Maserati 3.7L S6 supercharged	260 bhp	250	750
(Germany) Auto Union	Type A	Auto Union 4.35L V16 supercharged	295 bhp	270	750
(Germany) Mercedes-Benz	W25A	Mercedes-Benz 3.35L S8 supercharged	350 bhp	280	750
(France) SEFAC		SEFAC 2.8L 2x4 supercharged	250 bhp	240	750

== Teams and drivers ==
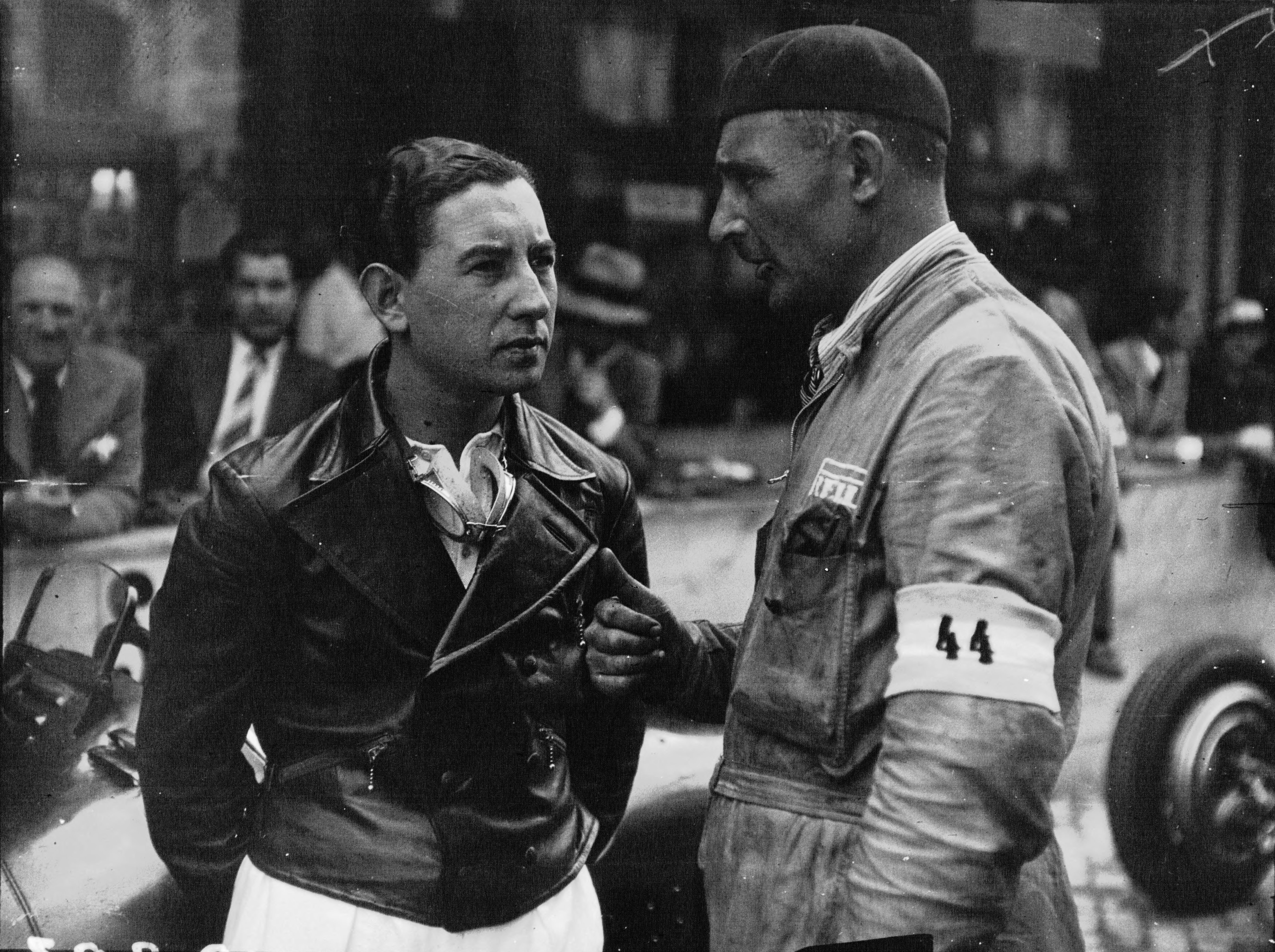
Up-and-coming star Guy Moll was signed to Scuderia Ferrari

The previous season had seen its share of manoeuvring and upheaval, not helped by the sad loss of key drivers through the year in accidents. However, the advent of the new Championship saw the return of works racing teams. After a tumultuous year, the mercurial Nuvolari chose to remain an independent driver. The Scuderia Ferrari was still the designated team for Alfa Romeo and received close support from that manufacturer, with its uprated model. Louis Chiron, recruited near the end of the previous season was retained, and joined by former Bugatti teammate Achille Varzi and Algerian rising star Guy Moll. Team stalwarts Conte Carlo Felice Trossi (Ferrari president) and Gianfranco Comotti were called upon as needed as were other Italians as the Scuderia attempted to cover as many races in as many formats as possible.

Varzi had lost patience with Bugatti and its under-performing Type 59. In his stead, the team hired the young Jean-Pierre Wimille to join René Dreyfus, while Pierre Veyron competed in the voiturette races. They convinced Robert Benoist to come out of retirement, running his Bugatti garage in Paris, as well as offering Tazio Nuvolari a Type 59 (repainted red) for certain races. Their cable-operated brakes were now obsolete and a hindrance to getting peak performance.

Despite its temperamental nature, the Maserati 8CM was available to privateers and was picked up by a number of teams, including the Gruppo Genovese San Giorgio, Scuderia Siena and Whitney Straight. The Maserati works effort was wound back, with Goffredo Zehender running in selective events. The company instead put more focus on building racing cars for sale. The smaller 4C voiturette models (4CM and 4CS) were proving very competitive and popular. One of the most competitive customer teams was the Scuderia Subalpina, with Luigi Castelbarco, Giovanni Lurani and the up-and-coming Giuseppe Farina.

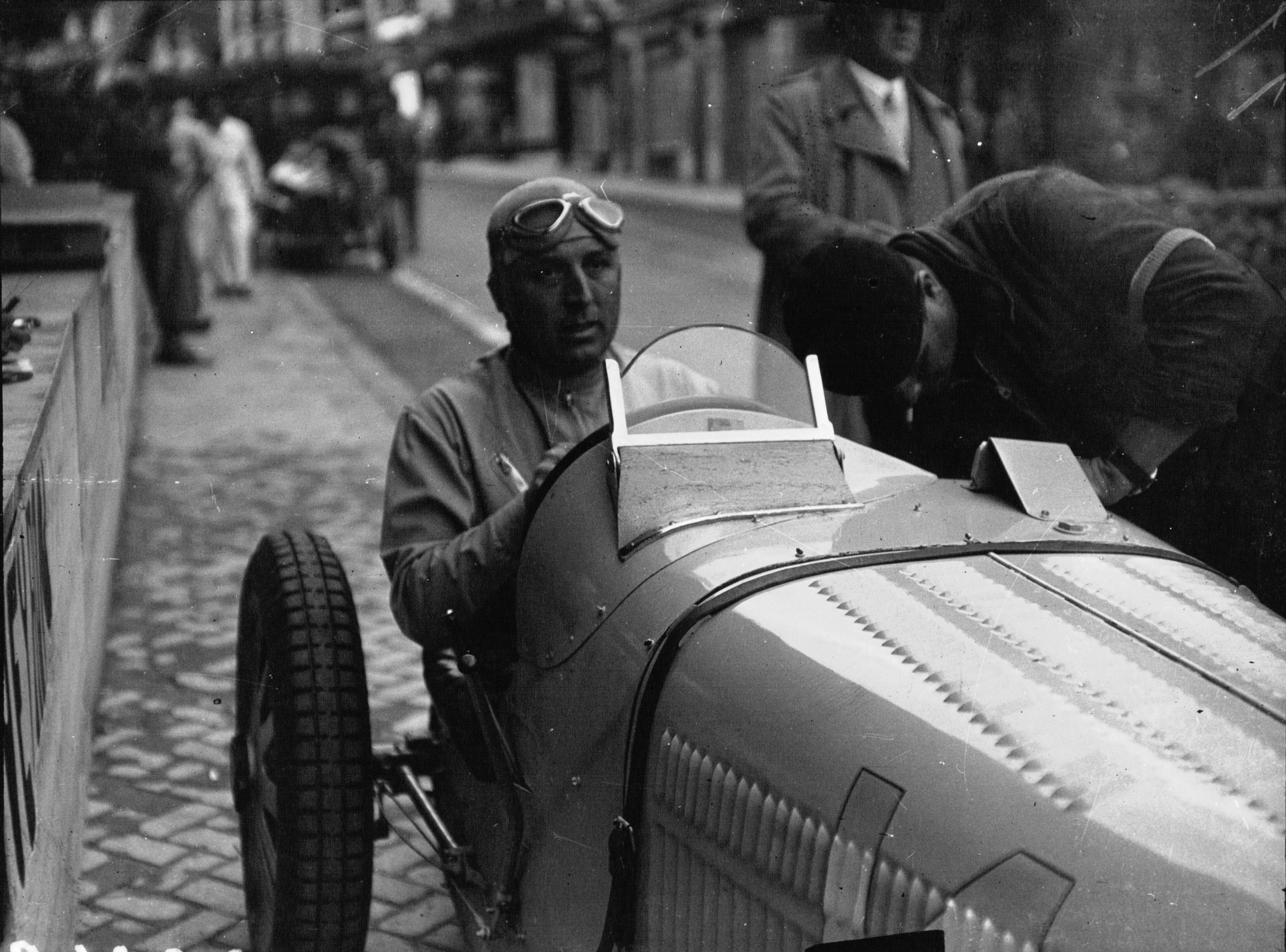
Swiss Louis Braillard (seen here at Montreux) ran his own privateer team

With the government backing, the two German teams entered racing with a patriotic line-up of all-German racers. The Auto Union team was managed by Willy Walb (who had driven the “Tropfenwagen” back in 1923). Their lead drivers would be Hans Stuck and Hermann, Prinz zu Leiningen, with August Momberger called out of retirement, and Wilhelm Sebastian as reserves. The Mercedes team was led by Rudolf Caracciola, joined by young tearaway Manfred von Brauchitsch, along with Hanns Geier and world-record holding motorcycle racer Ernst Henne as reserves (although Henne was seriously injured in a testing accident in March.). However, team manager Alfred Neubauer had some misgivings about Caracciola, after convalescing from serious injury for a year and then suffering the sudden death of his wife in a skiing accident in February. He therefore decided to hire Italian Luigi Fagioli for his experience and expertise.

These tables only intend to cover entries in the major races, using the key above. It includes all starters in the Grandes Épreuves. Sources:

Entrant	Constructor	Chassis	Engine	Tyre	Driver	Rounds
(France) Automobiles Ettore Bugatti	Bugatti	Type 59	Bugatti 2.8L S8 s/c Bugatti 3.3L S8 s/c	?	(France) René Dreyfus	1, 2, 4, 6; [B], F
(France) Automobiles Ettore Bugatti	Bugatti	Type 59	Bugatti 2.8L S8 s/c Bugatti 3.3L S8 s/c	?	(France) Jean-Pierre Wimille	1, 2*, 6; A, [B], G
(France) Automobiles Ettore Bugatti	Bugatti	Type 59	Bugatti 2.8L S8 s/c Bugatti 3.3L S8 s/c	?	(France) Robert Benoist	[1], 2, 4; [B], G
(France) Automobiles Ettore Bugatti	Bugatti	Type 59	Bugatti 2.8L S8 s/c Bugatti 3.3L S8 s/c	?	(Italy) Tazio Nuvolari	2, 6
(France) Automobiles Ettore Bugatti	Bugatti	Type 59	Bugatti 2.8L S8 s/c Bugatti 3.3L S8 s/c	?	(Italy) Marchese Antonio Brivio	4, [5], 6; [A], [B], E
(France) Automobiles Ettore Bugatti	Bugatti	Type 59	Bugatti 2.8L S8 s/c Bugatti 3.3L S8 s/c	?	(France) Pierre Veyron	1♠; Bv, Fv
(Italy) Officine Alfieri Maserati SpA	Maserati	Tipo 26M; V5; Tipo 8CM	Maserati 2.5L S4 s/c Maserati 4.9L 2x8 s/c Maserati 3.0L S8 s/c	?	(Italy) Piero Taruffi	1; A, [B]
(Italy) Officine Alfieri Maserati SpA	Maserati	Tipo 26M; V5; Tipo 8CM	Maserati 2.5L S4 s/c Maserati 4.9L 2x8 s/c Maserati 3.0L S8 s/c	?	(Italy) Conte Goffredo Zehender	2, 3, 5; A, [B], D, E
(Germany) Daimler-Benz AG	Mercedes-Benz	W25	Mercedes-Benz 3.35L S8 s/c	C	(Germany) Rudolf Caracciola	2, 3, [4], 5, 6; [B], [C], E, F, G
(Germany) Daimler-Benz AG	Mercedes-Benz	W25	Mercedes-Benz 3.35L S8 s/c	C	(Italy) Luigi Fagioli	2, 3, [4], 5, 6; [B], C, E, F, G
(Germany) Daimler-Benz AG	Mercedes-Benz	W25	Mercedes-Benz 3.35L S8 s/c	C	(Germany) Manfred von Brauchitsch	2, [3], [4]; [B], C, F
(Germany) Daimler-Benz AG	Mercedes-Benz	W25	Mercedes-Benz 3.35L S8 s/c	C	(Germany) Hanns Geier	3; F, G
(Germany) Daimler-Benz AG	Mercedes-Benz	W25	Mercedes-Benz 3.35L S8 s/c	C	(Germany) Ernst Henne	2*, 5, 6*; E, G
(Germany) Auto Union AG	Auto Union	Type A	Auto Union 4.4L V16 s/c	C	(Germany) Hans Stuck	2, 3, [4], 5, 6; B, C, E, F, G
(Germany) Auto Union AG	Auto Union	Type A	Auto Union 4.4L V16 s/c	C	(Germany) August Momberger	2, 3, [4], 5; B, C, F
(Germany) Auto Union AG	Auto Union	Type A	Auto Union 4.4L V16 s/c	C	(Germany) Hermann, Prinz zu Leiningen	[2], 5, 6; B, C, F, G
(Germany) Auto Union AG	Auto Union	Type A	Auto Union 4.4L V16 s/c	C	(Germany) Ernst-Günther von Burggaller	3
(Germany) Auto Union AG	Auto Union	Type A	Auto Union 4.4L V16 s/c	C	(Germany) Wilhelm Sebastian	3*, 5*; E, G
(Italy) Scuderia Ferrari	Alfa Romeo	Tipo B	Alfa Romeo 2.6L S8 s/c Alfa Romeo 2.9L S8 s/c Alfa Romeo 3.2L S8 s/c	E	(Italy) Achille Varzi	1, 2, 3, 4, 5, 6; A, B, D, E, F, G
(Italy) Scuderia Ferrari	Alfa Romeo	Tipo B	Alfa Romeo 2.6L S8 s/c Alfa Romeo 2.9L S8 s/c Alfa Romeo 3.2L S8 s/c	E	(Monaco) Louis Chiron	1, 2, 3, 4, 5, 6; A, B, C, D, [E], F, G
(Italy) Scuderia Ferrari	Alfa Romeo	Tipo B	Alfa Romeo 2.6L S8 s/c Alfa Romeo 2.9L S8 s/c Alfa Romeo 3.2L S8 s/c	E	(French Algeria) Guy Moll	1, 2, 3; A, B, D, E†
(Italy) Scuderia Ferrari	Alfa Romeo	Tipo B	Alfa Romeo 2.6L S8 s/c Alfa Romeo 2.9L S8 s/c Alfa Romeo 3.2L S8 s/c	E	(Italy) Conte Carlo Felice Trossi	1, 2, 5, 6*; A
(Italy) Scuderia Ferrari	Alfa Romeo	Tipo B	Alfa Romeo 2.6L S8 s/c Alfa Romeo 2.9L S8 s/c Alfa Romeo 3.2L S8 s/c	E	(French Algeria) Marcel Lehoux	1
(Italy) Scuderia Ferrari	Alfa Romeo	Tipo B	Alfa Romeo 2.6L S8 s/c Alfa Romeo 2.9L S8 s/c Alfa Romeo 3.2L S8 s/c	E	(Italy) Gianfranco Comotti	5, 6*; G
(Italy) Scuderia Ferrari	Alfa Romeo	Tipo B	Alfa Romeo 2.6L S8 s/c Alfa Romeo 2.9L S8 s/c Alfa Romeo 3.2L S8 s/c	E	(Italy) Mario Tadini	5*; A, C
(Italy) Scuderia Ferrari	Alfa Romeo	Tipo B	Alfa Romeo 2.6L S8 s/c Alfa Romeo 2.9L S8 s/c Alfa Romeo 3.2L S8 s/c	E	(Italy) Attilio Marinoni	D*
(Italy) Scuderia Ferrari	Alfa Romeo	Tipo B	Alfa Romeo 2.6L S8 s/c Alfa Romeo 2.9L S8 s/c Alfa Romeo 3.2L S8 s/c	E	(Italy) Pietro Ghersi	E, F
(Italy) Gruppo Genovese San Giorgio	Alfa Romeo Maserati	8C-2300; 8C-2600; 26M	Alfa Romeo 2.3L S8 s/c Alfa Romeo 2.6L S8 s/c Maserati 2.8L S8 s/c	?	(Italy) Renato Balestrero	1, 3; D, F
(Italy) Gruppo Genovese San Giorgio	Alfa Romeo Maserati	8C-2300; 8C-2600; 26M	Alfa Romeo 2.3L S8 s/c Alfa Romeo 2.6L S8 s/c Maserati 2.8L S8 s/c	?	(Italy) Clemente Biondetti	2; D, F
(Italy) Gruppo Genovese San Giorgio	Alfa Romeo Maserati	8C-2300; 8C-2600; 26M	Alfa Romeo 2.3L S8 s/c Alfa Romeo 2.6L S8 s/c Maserati 2.8L S8 s/c	?	(Italy) Attilio Battilana	3
(Italy) Scuderia Siena	Maserati Alfa Romeo	26M; 8C-2300; 8C-2600	Maserati 3.0L S8 s/c Alfa Romeo 2.3L S8 s/c Alfa Romeo 2.6L S8 s/c	?	(Italy) Eugenio Siena	1; A, B, C
(Italy) Scuderia Siena	Maserati Alfa Romeo	26M; 8C-2300; 8C-2600	Maserati 3.0L S8 s/c Alfa Romeo 2.3L S8 s/c Alfa Romeo 2.6L S8 s/c	?	(Italy) Luigi Soffietti	3, 6; D, [F♠]
(Italy) Scuderia Siena	Maserati Alfa Romeo	26M; 8C-2300; 8C-2600	Maserati 3.0L S8 s/c Alfa Romeo 2.3L S8 s/c Alfa Romeo 2.6L S8 s/c	?	(Italy) Giovanni Minozzi	3; [C]
(United Kingdom) Whitney Straight Ltd	Maserati Alfa Romeo	8CM; 8C-2300	Maserati 3.0L S8 s/c Alfa Romeo 2.3L S8 s/c	?	(United States) / (United Kingdom) Whitney Straight	1, 5, 6*; A, D, E,
(United Kingdom) Whitney Straight Ltd	Maserati Alfa Romeo	8CM; 8C-2300	Maserati 3.0L S8 s/c Alfa Romeo 2.3L S8 s/c	?	(United Kingdom) Hugh Hamilton	3; A, [C], D, E, Ev, Fv, F†
(United Kingdom) Whitney Straight Ltd	Maserati Alfa Romeo	8CM; 8C-2300	Maserati 3.0L S8 s/c Alfa Romeo 2.3L S8 s/c	?	(France) Marcel Lehoux	6
(Switzerland) Ecurie Braillard	Maserati Bugatti	8CM; Type 51	Maserati 3.0L S8 s/c Bugatti 2.3L S8 s/c	?	(United States) Pete DePaolo	[2]
(Switzerland) Ecurie Braillard	Maserati Bugatti	8CM; Type 51	Maserati 3.0L S8 s/c Bugatti 2.3L S8 s/c	?	(France) Benoît Falchetto	6
(Switzerland) Ecurie Braillard	Maserati Bugatti	8CM; Type 51	Maserati 3.0L S8 s/c Bugatti 2.3L S8 s/c	?	(France) Robert Brunet	6; D♠
(United States) Frank Scully	Miller Duesenberg	4WD	Miller 5.0L V8; Miller 3.7L S8	?	(United States) Pete DePaolo	A, B♠
(United States) Frank Scully	Miller Duesenberg	4WD	Miller 5.0L V8; Miller 3.7L S8	?	(United States) Lou Moore	A
(Italy) Scuderia Balestrero	Alfa Romeo	8C-2600	Alfa Romeo 2.6L S8 s/c	?	(Italy) Renato Balestrero	A

=== Privateer Drivers ===
Entrant	Constructor	Chassis	Engine	Driver	Rounds
Private Entrant	Maserati	8CM	Maserati 3.0L S8 s/c	(France) Philippe Étancelin	1, 2; A, D
Private Entrant	Bugatti Maserati	Type 59; 8CM; 6C-34	Bugatti 2.8L S8 s/c Maserati 3.0L S8 s/c Maserati 3.7L S6 s/c	(Italy) Tazio Nuvolari	1, 3, 5; [A], B, C, D, E, F, G
Private Entrant	Maserati Bugatti Delage	8CM; Type 51; 15S8	Maserati 3.0L S8 s/c Bugatti 2.3L S8 s/c Delage 1.5L S8 s/c	(United Kingdom) Earl Howe	1, 5; [A], B, [Bv], [Cv], D, E, Fv, F
Private Entrant	Maserati	8CM; 4CS	Maserati 3.0L S8 s/c Maserati 1.5L S4 s/c	(Italy) / (Switzerland) Hans Rüesch	3, 5; [B], C, Fv, [F]
Private Entrant	Alfa Romeo	8C-2600	Alfa Romeo 2.6L S8 s/c	(Germany) Paul Pietsch	[3]; B, C
Private Entrant	Bugatti	Type 51; Type 37A	Bugatti 2.3L S8 s/c Bugatti 1.5L S4 s/c	(Kingdom of Hungary) László Hartmann	3; C, Fv, F, G
Private Entrant	Alfa Romeo	8C-2300	Alfa Romeo 2.3L S8 s/c	(Switzerland) Ulrich Maag	3; C
Private Entrant	Alfa Romeo	8C-2300	Alfa Romeo 2.3L S8 s/c	(France) Raymond Sommer	4; A, D
Private Entrant	Montier	Spéciale	Ford 3.6L V8	(France) Charles Montier	4
Private Entrant	Bugatti	Type 51A	Bugatti 1.5L S4 s/c	(Germany) Ernst-Günther von Burggaller	Bv, Cv, Fv, Gv
Private Entrant	Alfa Romeo	8C-2300; 8C-2600	Alfa Romeo 2.3L S8 s/c Alfa Romeo 2.6L S8 s/c	(Sweden) Per-Viktor Widengren	A, C
Private Entrant	Alfa Romeo	8C-2300; 8C-2600	Alfa Romeo 2.3L S8 s/c Alfa Romeo 2.6L S8 s/c	(United Kingdom) Clifton Penn-Hughes	C, E, [F]

‘’Note: ‘’ * indicates only raced in the event as a relief driver,
“♠“ Works driver raced as a privateer in that race,
“v” indicates the driver ran in the Voiturette class,
“†” driver killed during this racing season,
Those in brackets show that, although entered, the driver did not race

== Season review ==
=== Opening at Monaco ===
After several Scandinavian ice-races at the start of the year, the first major event was the glamorous Monaco Grand Prix, held on Easter Monday. The invitational field of 16 did not include the Germans, who wanted a race debut in Germany. Scuderia Ferrari arrived in force with five entries: Varzi and Trossi were given the new 2.9-litre Tipo B, while Chiron, Lehoux and his young protégé Guy Moll had the 2.6-litre versions. Bugatti had the 2.8-litre Type 59 for Dreyfus, Wimille and Robert Benoist (in his first race here since 1929). They also had a car painted red for Nuvolari – nominally an independent, but with strong works support, as did Pierre Veyron in a 2.3-litre Type 51. Officine Maserati only had the single works entry with an older 2.-5-litre Tipo 26M for Piero Taruffi. Wealthy Englishman, Earl Howe had a brand new 8CM, while Whitney Straight and Philippe Étancelin had their 1933 models. The final entries were Eugenio Siena in his older Maserati 26M and Renato Balestrero in an Alfa Romeo Monza.

The Maserati cars were all stretched to get under the 750 kg limit, draining oil from engines, gearboxes and axles and even resorting to alloy wheels to get below the line. On the first day of practice, Trossi was the only driver to get below a 2-minute lap, with a 1m59s, which he improved it to 1m58s on the Saturday. Étancelin, Varzi and Nuvolari were able to post 1m59s as well. Benoist had done a 2m02s but then had a major crash at the Ste Devote right-hander after the start. He was uninjured but the bent axle meant the car would be a non-starter. Howe had a split fuel tank but, as a former naval officer, was able to get repairs courtesy of the visiting British cruiser HMS Delhi, in port. Race-day started with heavy rain, but by race start at 12.30pm it was sunny and dry again for the 100,000 spectators. Following the system started at Monaco the year before, the cars started according to their practice lap-times, with Trossi on pole, the cars lined up three-wide. But it was Chiron who darted through from the second row who took the initial lead. Trossi pitted after the first lap to change spark plugs. After 20 of the 100 laps, Chiron had a 5-second lead over Dreyfus, with Étancelin and Moll further back, and Nuvolari in fifth nearly a minute behind. Varzi had stopped for new plugs and was a lap back. Chiron continued to build his lead and by half-distance with only Étancelin, Dreyfus and Moll still on the lead lap. Then on lap 62 Étancelin slid wide and hit the sandbags, taking him out the race. Dreyfus was losing a lot of time with a failing clutch and was passed by Moll and Nuvolari. Although the Italian then had major brake problems of his own and had to pit, losing several laps. All looked well for Chiron, who was easing off his lap-times to protect his car and holding a three-quarter lap lead over Moll. Then, with two laps to go, he lost concentration and hit the sandbags at the 180-degree Loews hairpin. By the time, he had extricated his Alfa; Moll was through and took a surprise victory over his team-mate. Dreyfus and Lehoux finished a lap behind.

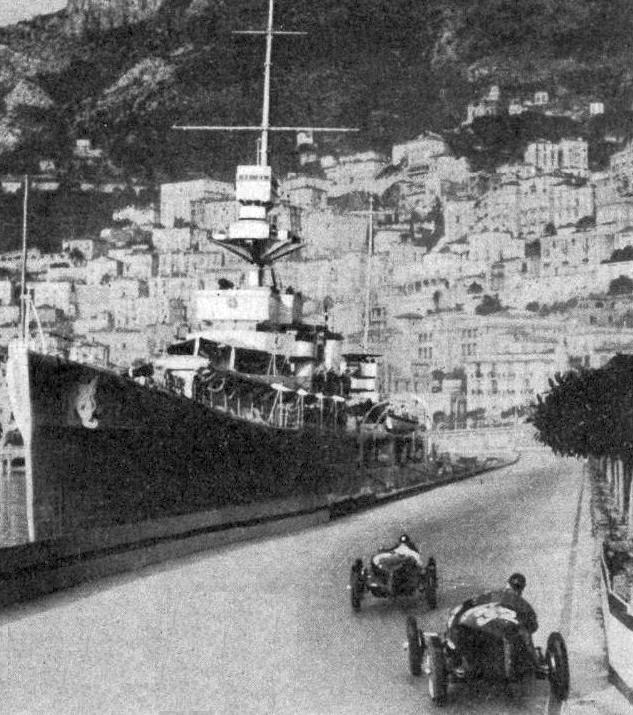
Taruffi (Maserati) on the quay, passing HMS Delhi

Ferrari dominated the next event, just across the Alps at Alessandria. Run as two heats before a 15-lap final, the first heat was marred by a serious accident. It was run in heavy rain and on the first lap Swiss driver Carlo Pedrazzini crashed on a bridge. Thrown out, he later died of his injuries. The first heat was won by Chiron, the second by Varzi. The rain returned for the final and on the second lap Trossi baulked Nuvolari in his Maserati, at the same bridge as the earlier crash. Taking evasive action, the car ricocheted off two trees and rolled, ripping off the front suspension. Nuvolari was taken to hospital with a broken leg. Thereafter, the race was a clean sweep for Ferrari taking the top four places: Varzi, Chiron, Tadini and Comotti.

=== Alfa Romeo Ascendant ===
The teams next moved across the Mediterranean to Libya for the Tripoli Grand Prix, held again in conjunction with a large state lottery worth 1.2 million lire prizemoney, split between the drivers and the successful ticket-holders. After the big windfall the previous year, the Mellaha circuit had received extensive improvements, with a huge grandstand constructed as well as a 40-metre high race officials' tower. The track had been widened and six sharp corners were given some banking. Scuderia Ferrari had six entries, including Chiron, Varzi, Moll and Trossi in 2.9-litre Tipo Bs. There were two Type 59 Bugattis for Dreyfus, Brivio and Wimille. The open-engine formula meant Maserati dusted off the big V5 bimotore for Taruffi (Nuvolari, though entered with them, was still in hospital), while Zehender had an 8CM. Amongst the privateers, Anglo-American Whitney Straight had two further 8CMs for himself and Hugh Hamilton and there were a squadron of 2.- and 2.6-litre Alfa Monzas, including Raymond Sommer, Swede Per-Viktor Widengren and Englishman George Eyston. Perhaps the most interesting entries were from the American Frank Scully who bought over two Miller-powered roadsters. Colonial governor Italo Balbo personally invited Peter DePaolo and Lou Moore after his notable aviation visit to the US for the Chicago World's Fair the year before. DePaolo had a 308cu in (5.2-litre) V8 4WD that put out 300 bhp and got up to 260 km/h. It was the first time a four-wheel drive car had competed in a Grand Prix. Moore had a 255cu in (4.2-litre) rear-drive in a Duesenberg chassis, which he had finished third in the Indianapolis 500 last year. Unfortunately their poor brakes would leave them at a significant disadvantage compared to a high-speed oval. Practice had several spectacular accidents, for Zehender, Dreyfus and Varzi, fortunately without serious injury. A huge crowd was on hand to see the 26 cars, lined up 5-wide in numerical order, take the start. From the front row, Taruffi took the lead in the big Maserati, followed by Chiron, Varzi, Hamilton, Trossi and Wimille. Zehender's Maserati only lasted one lap, still with many issues from his practice accident. Chiron took the lead on lap 4 and started building a gap. Then on lap 7, Taruffi's front axle locked sending him into a vicious set of spins before riding up a sand dune and getting airborne. Thrown out, the driver was just missed as the machine landed beside him. Doused in petrol and with a broken arm, Taruffi was quickly taken to hospital. The race settled down and as the drivers stopped for fuel and tyres after an hour, Varzi overtook Chiron in the pits, and Moll had moved up to third ahead of Hamilton, who retired on lap 30 with a broken magneto. Going into the last quarter of the race, the three Alfas were a lap ahead of the field. Moll put in some lightning-quick laps to reel in his team-mates dicing for the lead. Chiron narrowly led with two laps to go, but going into the final lap, Varzi had a 100-metre advantage over Moll with Chiron suffering oil pressure problems. Going into the last corner, Moll made a lunge but Varzi squeezed him to get a better run down the long straight to the finish, crossing side-by-side with Varzi just half a car-length ahead of an angry Moll.

The 25th Targa Florio should have been a significant event but was now a dismal affair, with just a small all-Italian entry. A single Bugatti and Maserati took on eleven Alfas on the abbreviated, piccolo circuit. In a wet race, Varzi took a comfortable victory for a Ferrari 1–2, but it was marred by the severe accident of Giovanni Alloatti when his Bugatti slid off the bridge at Cardellino and fell ten metres. Taken to hospital with a broken back, he died three weeks later. Held on the same day, the top French drivers were at Casablanca. Scuderia Ferrari had split their options and sent Chiron and Lehoux and Comotti to Morocco. They were challenged by the privateer Maseratis of Sommer, Étancelin and Straight. Once again Chiron had a comfortable lead, but this time his car was reliable and he could take the win a lap ahead of Étancelin and Lehoux.

=== Enter Auto Union ===
The Avusrennen had a great expectation around it, as it heralded the race debut of the new German teams. Three cars from each squad arrived, all in a polished silver – due to the bare aluminium buffed to a high sheen, saving 2–3 kg weight without the number of coats of lacquer paint normally applied (at odds with Neubauer's fanciful anecdote that white paint was scraped off to save weight). The respective drivers were Caracciola, Faglioli and von Brauchitsch for Mercedes and Stuck, zu Leiningen and Momberger for Auto Union. Ferrari arrived with three Tipo Bs, two regular 2.9-litre cars for Varzi and Chiron and a special streamlined version for Moll, fitted with a bigger 3.2-litre engine. German Paul Pietsch raced a 2.6-litre Monza. Maserati had an 8CM for Zehender who replaced the Taruffi, injured at Tripoli. He was supported by Earl Howe in his own car and the indefatigable Nuvolari, still recovering from the double fracture of his leg, racing another Maserati with his leg in plaster. Pete DePaolo brought the big Miller 4WD to Berlin, while Moore had returned to the US for the Indy 500. Bugatti had entered four cars but pulled out just days before the race. A huge crowd of 220,000 came to the Berlin circuit. However, there was drama when Mercedes withdrew following practice – citing fuel pump problems affecting their top speed. As the eleven remaining cars formed up on the grid, an intense hailstorm hit the track. Although Chiron led off from the line, Stuck had a 47-second lead over the three Alfas by the end of the first lap. After six laps, the rain had stopped and the track was drying. Moll moved into second when Chiron who pitted, over a minute behind Stuck. He then took the lead as Stuck also pitted with a slipping clutch, which eventually led to his retirement. Moll carried on steadily and completed the fifteen laps with a comfortable 90-second gap to Varzi, ahead of Momberger (who had set the fastest lap but also had clutch problems late in the race). Although extremely fast, the new cars did not have the reliability yet. Earlier in the afternoon, the 1.5-litre voiturette race was held. Pierre Veyron, in the works Bugatti, had resumed his rivalry with Ernst-Günther von Burggaller, also in a Bugatti Type 51A, from the year before. This time Veyron had the victory in another close contest.

A week later, the teams met again for the Eifelrennen at the Nürburgring. The track had just completed a number of improvements. The race was held on the same day as the Montreux race in Switzerland. Both the Auto Union and Mercedes-Benz teams were present although Caracciola did not practice, as he felt his leg would not withstand the strain of that circuit. Ferrari split its team between the two races, with Chiron and Tadini coming here, supported by five other cars including Paul Pietsch, Per-Viktor Widengren and Mlle Hellé Nice. Nuvolari arrived with his Maserati, and his leg still in plaster. Once again, the Bugatti works team did not attend but there were a number of privateer cars. There was the story that the Mercedes cars were found to be 1 kg overweight at scrutineering, so team manager Neubauer had the paint stripped off the cars. Down to a thin coast of aluminium paint on the polished metal, the press coined them the "Silver Arrows". The grid was augmented by a 1.5-litre class and an 800cc class, to combine to be the largest field yet run at the Nürburgring, with 44 cars. Another huge crowd of 200,000 people turned up and after morning fog and cloud had cleared, the race started in sunshine. Starting from the front row, von Brauchitsch took the lead, soon joined by teammate Fagioli who had weaved through the field from the eighth row of the grid. However, only 300 metres from the start, the Bugatti of Austrian Emil Frankl went off at the Südkurve. The car rolled and got airborne, landing in the middle of the road and throwing the driver out. The unconscious Frankl was taken to Adenau hospital but died later. The race settled down with the two Mercedes ahead of Stuck and Chiron. Fagioli was directed to follow team orders and stay behind to allow a German driver take the team's first victory. This left him furious, and at his next pit-stop he had blazing row about it with Neubauer. Von Brauchitsch took the victory, with Mercedes winning on debut, with Stuck coming second. Fagioli did not finish, as he stopped on the straight leading up to the grandstand and walked off – supposedly due to a broken fuel line.

The new Montreux race was a street-race through the Swiss town at the eastern end of Lake Geneva with narrow, tight corners and over tram tracks. The Ferrari team sent half their team, with Varzi, Moll and Trossi. Officine Maserati had Goffredo Zehender running a 2.5-litre Tipo 26M, while Whitney Straight had his two 8CMs, as did Étancelin. The other privateer team was the Ecurie Braillard, who hedged their bets entering a Bugatti (Braillard), a Maserati (Falchetto) and an Alfa Romeo (Sommer) while Veyron ran his factory-supported Bugatti T51. After heavy rain in the morning, the cars lined up in order of practice times, and Étancelin took the lead from his pole position. On a difficult track to pass, he pulled away from the chasing pack, led by Straight, Varzi and Trossi. When Straight had to slow to wipe oil off his goggles, the Ferrari drivers picked up the pursuit. For 88 of the 90 laps, Étancelin led but then his brakes started to fade and Trossi caught and passed him to take the win.

=== French Grand Prix ===
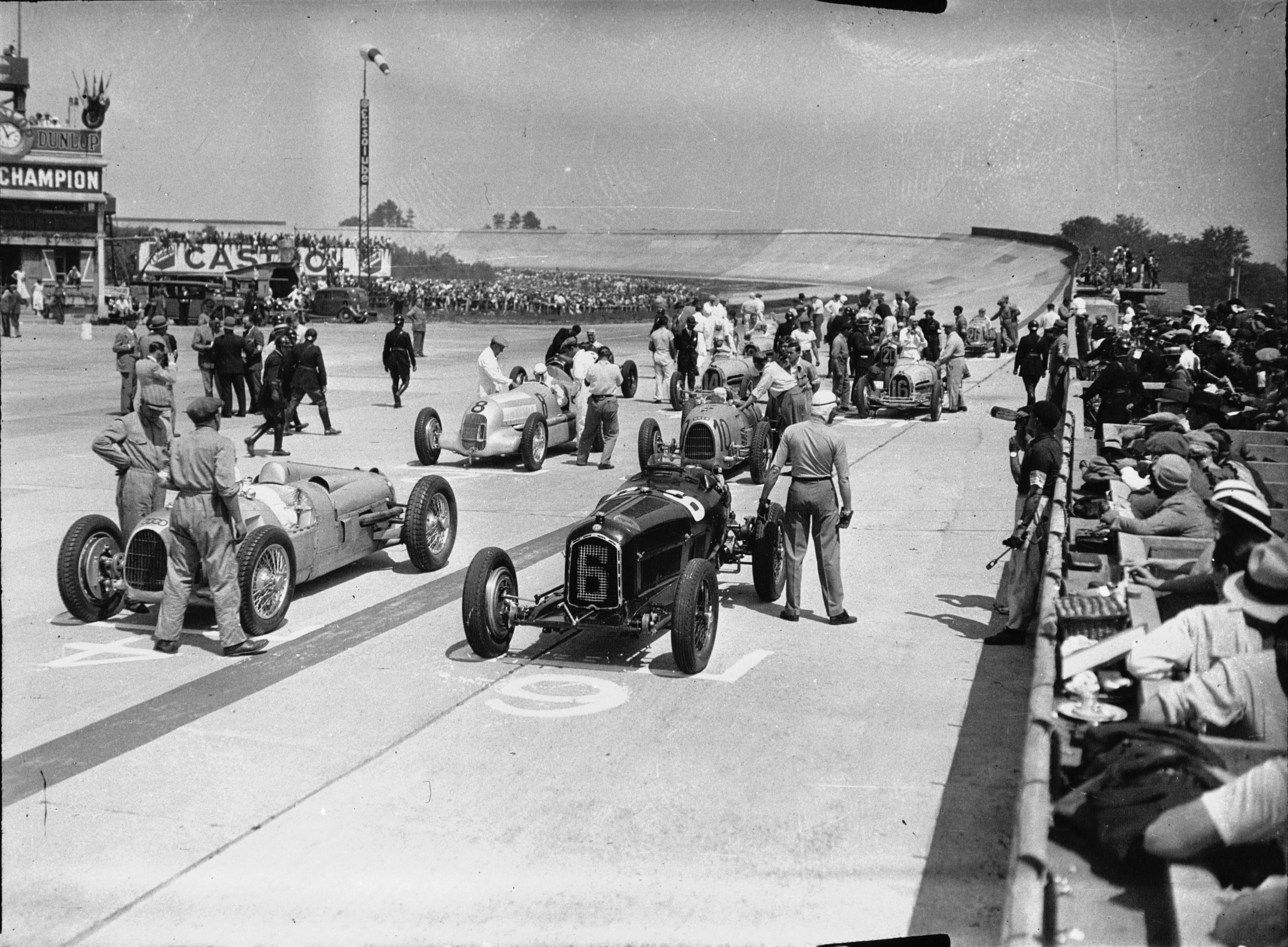
Stuck and Varzi on the front row of the grid for the French GP

The premier race of the year saw the German teams racing outside of Germany for the first time this season, each with their regular three drivers used previously. Bugatti had deliberately stayed away from other races to prepare their Type 59s for the race. Their drivers would be Benoist (making his racing comeback) and Dreyfus, joined by a recovering Nuvolari. The three Ferrari drivers chosen were Varzi, Chiron and Trossi, while Maserati had Zehender in an uprated 3-litre Tipo 26M. Étancelin was the only privateer, but had works support from Maserati this time. Raymond Sommer was going to run the new SEFAC design, but when the car proved far from race-ready, the entry was withdrawn. American Pete DePaolo was supposed to run a Maserati for the Ecurie Braillard, but had been injured a fortnight earlier at the Spanish Penya Rhin race and was not present. Forty laps of the Montlhéry circuit was a fraction over the minimum 500 km stipulated by the AIACR for Grand Épreuves. The organisers had installed a new electric timing system that printed out the car number and its lap time to a tenth of second each lap. In practice the Auto Unions soon put in the fastest laps, with Stuck equalling the lap record on his first flying lap, despite having never raced at Montlhéry before. Most teams had problems – Bugatti and Maserati with ignition, Auto Union with fuel pumps and Mercedes with tyre wear. Although the Bugattis were five seconds faster than Nuvolari's lap record, they were will still seven seconds slower than the best Mercedes time. The race started in very hot weather; zu Leiningen was unwell and did not race. From the third row, Chiron jumped the start and overtook Caracciola at the end of the first lap to take the lead. Stuck overtook him on lap 4 and together they built a lead over the Mercedes of Fagioli and Caracciola. The Bugattis of Benoist and Nuvolari had both pitted early on with spark plug troubles. Neubauer gave his drivers the hurry-up and Fagioli broke the lap record several times as he closed back up.

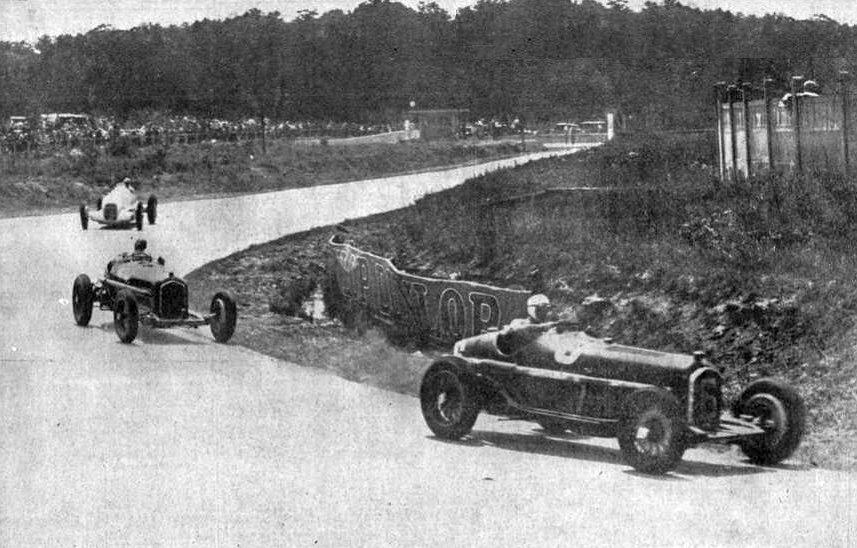
Varzi leading Trossi and Caracciola at Montlhéry

After an hour (12 laps), after Stuck had pitted for fuel and tyres there were two distinct Alfa-Mercedes duels: with Chiron battling Fagioli and Varzi hounding Caracciola a minute back. Then suddenly it was all change: a few laps later Fagioli went wide and broke a hydraulic brakepipe and Caracciola stopped out on the track with fuel-feed problems. Stuck was hampered with an overheating engine and now third, a lap down. Trossi pitted the third Alfa and Moll relieved him, in a car without first gear. At halfway, after 20 laps, there were only six cars remaining, with Alfa Romeo running 1-2-3, ahead of Stuck, Benoist and Zehender several laps down. The race petered out to a boring procession, with Stuck and Zehender both retiring later and Benoist finishing four laps behind. It was a dominant display by Alfa Romeo who had matched the German cars for speed and outlasted them in reliability. A week later, the Scuderia Ferrari repeated the 1-2-3 finish at the Marne Grand Prix (albeit without any German cars present), this time with Moll finishing second ahead of Varzi.

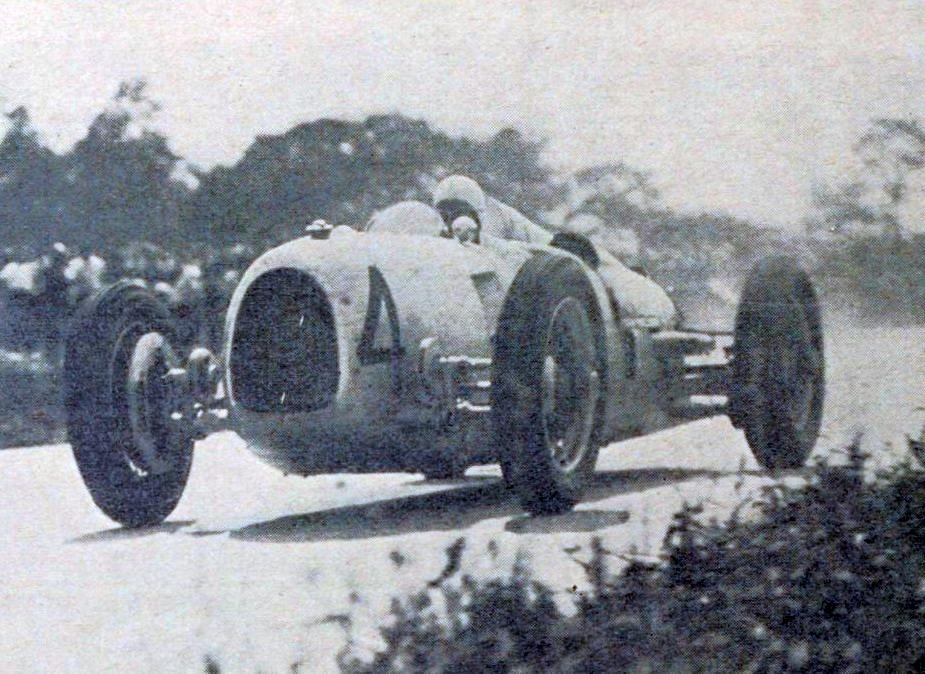
Stuck (Auto Union) at the French GP

=== German Grand Prix ===
A fortnight after the French GP, many of the same protagonists arrived for the German GP at the Nürburgring. However, the German teams had their problems. Prinz zu Leiningen was in hospital with kidney disease, so after trials, Ernst Burggaller was called up to drive the third Auto Union, alongside Stuck and Momberger. Then in practice, Mercedes driver von Brauchitsch crashed, getting concussion and two broken ribs. His place was taken by reserve driver Hans Geier. Scuderia Ferrari had their regular three (Chiron, Varzi and Moll) with additional Alfa Romeo Monzas entered by two other Italian teams, the Scuderia Siena and Gruppo Genovese San Giorgio. Zehender once again had the older works Maserati 26M, while Nuvolari and Hugh Hamilton (driving for Whitney Straight) had the more modern 8CM models. Bugatti was a notable absentee. An estimated 200,000 spectators arrived for the 25-lap race. From the start, the German cars dominated with Stuck and Caracciola building a lead. After seven laps both Varzi and Moll had retired with broken gearboxes, leaving Chiron vainly in pursuit of the leaders (having himself lost third gear). Caracciola took the lead at the halfway point when Stuck had to take avoiding action trying to lap Geier spinning right in front of him at the Karussell corner. However, he burned out a piston and was forced to retire a lap later. With three laps to go, Stuck came past the pits in the lead, gesticulating at an overheating engine. The team waved him on, and he had enough time in hand to nurse the car home for Auto Union's first victory. Fagioli was second for Mercedes while Chiron finished eight minutes back and Nuvolari was a lap behind in fourth.

The week after was the Coppa Ciano, run on the long, winding Montenero Circuit. Latterly a major international event but this year it was an all-Italian affair with Alfa Romeos being 14 of the 19 starters (including five from Scuderia Ferrari). The opposition was led by Nuvolari and his Maserati 8CM while Giuseppe Tuffanelli raced the works car, a 3-litre 8C model. In the race, it was Moll and Nuvolari who duelled for the lead initially but when Moll had to pit for a new wheel hub and Nuvolari had suspension problems, it was Varzi who came through for the victory ahead of them. Once again, Ferrari split their team to run at the Dieppe GP on the same weekend. Run as two heats and a two-hour final, the event was tainted by the death of Jean Gaupillat, a regular Bugatti privateer for eight years. The Frenchman's only major victory had been in this event in 1929. In a surprise result, Philippe Étancelin and his Maserati beat the Ferrari pair of Chiron and Lehoux.

The Belgian Grand Prix had an abbreviated entry list – the German teams did not arrive when the Belgian Customs office demanded 180,000 francs in duty for their alcohol-based racing fuel. This was a sizeable sum, considering the race-winner would only receive 50,000 francs. Nuvolari had been unluckily delayed driving from Italy by European politics – Austria was in the middle of the July Putsch. This just left a rather pitiful seven entries – the two Ferrari Alfas for Chiron and Varzi would be against a full Bugatti team of Benoist, Dreyfus and Brivio. The other two cars were Raymond Sommer's privateer Maserati, and 55-year old veteran Charles Montier bringing his old Ford V8 Special. From the start on a drizzly day, the Bugattis had sparkplug issues. Already by quarter-distance, the two Alfas had lapped the field and were cruising to victory when Chiron made an uncharacteristic mistake. Just after his pitstop, he went off at the Eau Rouge chicane and rolled the car. He was lucky to end over a drain that stopped him being crushed. Then, only nine laps later, Varzi brought his Alfa into the pits smoking from a blown engine. Suddenly Dreyfus found himself with an improbable lead, that he held to the finish ahead of Brivio. Sommer had been running ahead but a long pit-stop left him in third and he finished a lap back.

=== Races in Italy and Switzerland ===
Yet again, the Coppa Acerbo promised to be the most exciting race of the year, with the German cars coming to Italy for the first time. The triangular Pescara Circuit was long and very fast. From the city, it wound up into the Apennine foothills, before an 11 km long straight downhill to Montesilvano and a sprint along the coast back to the startline. This year, the circuit was modified with an artificial chicane coming into Pescara to slow the cars in front of the grandstands. Mercedes brought Henne in for the injured von Brauchitsch, joining Caracciola and Faglioli. Auto Union were without Leiningen (ill) and Momberger (injured) so Stuck was joined by Wilhelm Sebastian. He had been Caracciola's mechanic when they won the 1931 Mille Miglia and latterly Auto Union's lead mechanic. Ferrari entered four cars, for Chiron, Varzi, Moll and Ghersi. A single works Bugatti arrived, with Brivio driving a 3.3-litre Type 59. Maserati supported Zehender's entry and there were also 8CM models for Nuvolari, Whitney Straight and Earl Howe. Straight also had an older Maserati 26M for Hugh Hamilton (who won the voiturette preliminary race in an MG K3). Completing the field were the privateer entries of Secondo Corsi (Maserati 8C-2800) and Englishman Clifton Penn-Hughes (Alfa Romeo Monza). Four days earlier, Italy's first 24-hour sports car race, the Targa Abruzzo, was held on the track, and dominated by the Alfa Romeo 8C. It also gave Moll and Ghersi, who competed, extensive track knowledge. Practice was run in hot weather, and on a timed flying kilometre on the downhill straight, Caracciola and Henne were getting up to 290 km/h (180 mph) in their Mercedes. This was 20 km/h faster than the Alfa Romeos, while the privateer Maseratis were barely reaching 230 km/h. There was an incident when Fagioli went off in the twisty hilltop section at Spoltore, flying over a ditch and landing in a field, fortunately without serious repercussions. Race-day morning had sporadic showers pushed by the very strong south-easterly Scirocco wind. Although it stopped just as the cars lined up, the track was still very wet and slippery and the teams swapped their smooth racing tyres for grooved road ones. From the front row, Stuck, Varzi and Caracciola set the pace and the latter soon showed off his skill in the rain, taking the lead by the end of the first of twenty laps. Varzi and Stuck chased hard to stay in touch, but it broke Varzi's gearbox and Stuck's pistons, and they retired early. Caracciola had soon built a sizeable lead, but then on lap 9 made an rare error. Intermittent showers and strong winds made conditions random and difficult. In a similar place to Faglioli's practice accident, he slid off the track but landed in the ditch, wrecking the car. Faglioli took the lead, but when he stopped to refuel on the same lap, Moll roared past with Henne in hot pursuit. Varzi had taken over Ghersi's Alfa, going very fast and back up to fourth, ahead of Brivio and Nuvolari. Moll pitted on lap 11, giving a resurgent Varzi the lead ahead of Faglioli. However, the hard driving had taken a toll on Varzi's tyres and he then pitted again. And so it continued, with all three putting in very fast laps – Moll set a new lap record of 10m 51s to close the gap to Faglioli down to 15 seconds. He overcooked it coming into the chicane on lap 17 and spun. The same lap a despondent Varzi pitted with oil problems and handed the car back to Ghersi to try and make it to the finish. The next lap, Moll came up behind Henne to lap him through the mountain section. Leaving the Capelle hairpin onto the downhill straight, he tried to squeeze past immediately. His wheels slipped into the roadside ditch - whether it was a sudden wind gust or the narrowness of the road is unknown (the cars did not touch). Moll fought the car for fifty metres before a wheel hit a roadside post and catapulted the car into the air. Somersaulting for 300 metres, Moll was flung out and killed instantly when he hit a concrete wall. Faglioli won ahead of Nuvolari, Brivio and Ghersi.

The next major event was the inaugural Swiss Grand Prix, held at the 7.3 km Bremgarten circuit in the forest park north of Bern. Opened in 1931, it was the first purpose-built circuit in Switzerland and had only hosted motorcycle races to date. However, in the past year a new grandstand and pit complex had been built. A unique feature among tracks at this time was that the pits were on a separate road to the main track. Although it had no long straights, the track's sweeping curves made it a fast, exciting track for the drivers. A quality field of 20 was entered – led by the trio of cars from Auto Union and Mercedes-Benz. Dreyfus had the sole works Bugatti Type 59, while Hungarian privateer László Hartmann had a 2.3-litre Type 51, Ferrari had Varzi, Chiron and Ghersi, while the San Giorgio team had both a Monza (Balestrero) and a Maserati 8C (Biondetti). There were also three other 8CM Maseratis for Nuvolari, Earl Howe and Hugh Hamilton (driving for Whitney Straight). Stuck had done the fastest lap in practice to start from pole position, while the grid position of the other drivers was decided by lot. Earlier in the day, a voiturette race was held attracting the best field of the year. Starting from the back row, in pouring rain, Englishman Richard Seaman in Whitney Straight's 1.1-litre MG, came through the field to beat the 1.5-litre cars. The main race started in light rain at 1pm, and Stuck immediately shot off into the lead. The rain got heavier then eased off by lap 3, by which time had Stuck already built a 30-second lead over Nuvolari, Chiron and Dreyfus. On lap 9, Caracciola stopped at the points. His leg was aching badly, so the Mercedes relief driver Hanns Geier replaced him. After half an hour, and ten laps, Stuck had a lead of a minute, setting new fastest-laps each circuit. As the track dried, the cars came past the finish line at 230 km/h taking the first bend flat out. Around half-distance, as the fuel-stops came round, Stuck was able to come in and get out maintaining his lead. Dreyfus got his Bugatti out in second place ahead of Chiron. Nuvolari had already retired with a broken engine, with flames coming from the exhausts. After 50 laps, Stuck had a 2-minute lead over Dreyfus who was the only other driver on the lead lap. Momberger had caught and passed Chiron, and moved up to second when Dreyfus had to pit with five laps to go. Stuck took the chequered flag, having led start to finish, a lap ahead of his teammate Momberger. The event ended with tragedy though, when Hugh Hamilton crashed his Maserati braking for the Forsthaus corner. A puncture threw him off the track, bouncing off one pine-tree before slamming into another, killing the unfortunate Hamilton instantly and seriously injuring two spectators.

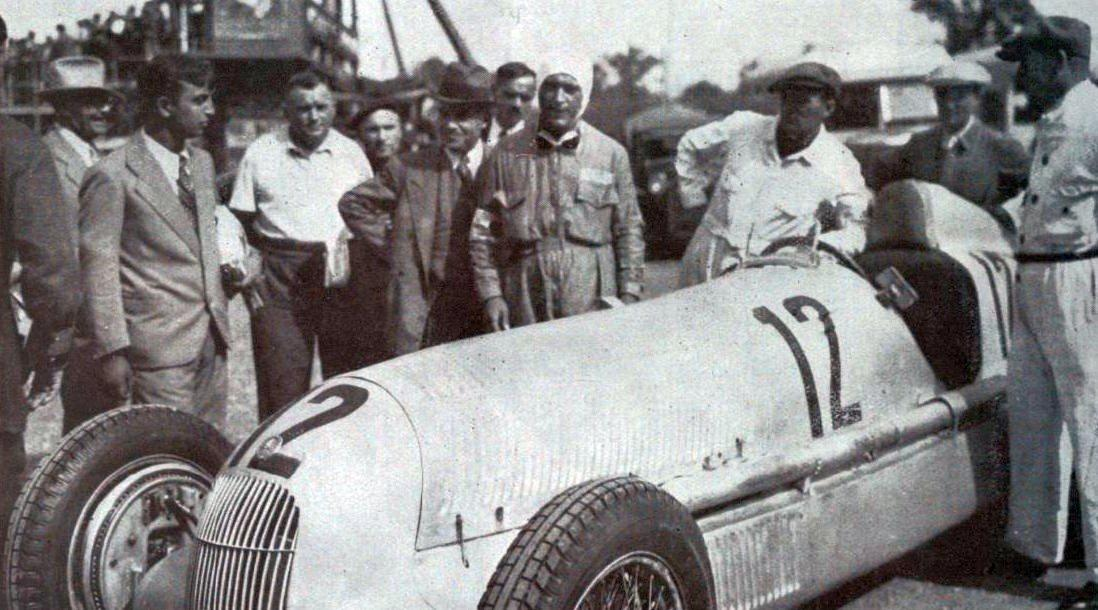
Fagioli after winning the Italian GP, and the Mercedes he shared with Caracciola

The 1933 edition of the Italian Grand Prix had been a tragic affair, known as the "Black Day of Monza". This year, the full circuit was abandoned and instead a 4.3 km track was contrived running in the opposite direction. Doubling back along the main straight, it took in the banked Curva Sud where a chicane had now been installed then, using the "Florio Link" halfway along the back straight, connected with the road course – a tight, taxing Monza course of hairpins and right-hand corners. The German teams both arrived with four cars, including ones for testing. Defending Italian honour, Ferrari also had four cars – for Varzi, Chiron, Comotti and Comte Trossi (stepping in for the deceased Moll). Maserati had Zehender running a works 8C-3000, and offered Nuvolari their brand new 6C-34 with its 3.7-litre straight-six engine. The car was still getting prepared during race practice. There were also privateer Maseratis for Whitney Straight and Swiss Hans Rüesch. Bugatti entered a Type 59 for Brivio, in Dreyfus' absence, while Earl Howe had his older Type 51. On the first day of practice, in an unusual incident, the Auto Union team offered Caracciola (Mercedes) and Chiron (Alfa Romeo) an opportunity to drive their car. They both found the car powerful, but below-par in handling and brakes. Another feature of the Auto Union was that the glycol engine coolant ran through the hollow car frame instead of dedicated piping to save weight. However, in the hot Italian sun its higher temperature made the cockpit exceedingly uncomfortable for the driver. The 116-lap race attracted 100,000 spectators. Brivio was a non-starter as he had blown his supercharger in practice. From the third row, Fagioli muscled his Mercedes to the front by the end of the first lap. Henne misjudged his braking at the front hairpin and punted Trossi off the track, damaging his own radiator and steering as well. Faglioli did the same on the next lap, dropping four places and was another early retirement for Mercedes, with a broken gearbox. This left the four remaining German cars at the front. Varzi and Nuvolari were thrilling the crowd duelling for fifth. This lasted twenty laps until the Maserati had to pit for new tyres. Momberger pitted with the soles of his feet burnt and blistered by his hot metal pedals, and was relieved by spare-driver Sebastian. In the half-distance pit-stops, the Mercedes did not need to change tyres, unlike the others, but Caracciola had badly bruised his right arm in the car and Faglioli jumped in to roar out into the lead. Leiningen had missed his pit signals, and ran out of fuel on the back straight. When he got back to the team, he was able to relieve Stuck who was exhausted and also had burnt feet. By lap 80, Fagioli had a one-lap lead over the Alfas of Varzi and Trossi and the Stuck/Leiningen Auto Union while Nuvolari was running fifth, three laps down with almost no brakes. Comotti, in sixth, was refuelling when overflowing gas hit the exhaust and burst into flames. An alert fire marshal immediately doused the fire and Comotti, although unconscious was pulled out uninjured, able to recover and then later relieve Trossi. Varzi retired on lap 97 with a broken gearbox, and in the torrid conditions, Fagioli was able to nurse home the Mercedes to take the win, over Stuck/Leiningen and Trossi/Comotti.

=== End of the season ===
Due to the devolving political situation, the staging of the Spanish Grand Prix had been uncertain, but a late confirmation saw the race go ahead with a good entry list for 30 laps of the long 17 km Lasarte circuit. Ferrari arrived, as did both German teams, and there was a full entry from Bugatti who had Dreyfus and Brivio joined by Nuvolari and Wimille. In practice, the Bugattis were several seconds faster than the competition and despite being overweight at scrutineering, managed to trim down to pass review. In the race, Stuck took the initial lead only to stop on track with a broken oil-pipe. This left Wimille battling the Mercedes of Fagioli and Caracciola for the lead as, for once, the Bugattis had a good set-up with good speed. Wimille lost six minutes with a carburettor problem allowing the German team to take a 1–2 victory. Nuvolari finished just a minute behind in what was one of Bugatti's best races of the year, well ahead of Scuderia Ferrari. At the Masaryk Circuit, the three big teams again squared off, although the arthritis afflicting August Momberger meant Wilhelm Sebastian again filled the third Auto Union seat. Maserati brought their new 6C-34 car for Nuvolari again, while Benoist and Wimille their Bugatti Type 59s as private-entries. The field was filled out with a number of local drivers in older models. Sadly, one of those drivers, Josef Brázdil was killed in practice on his first lap, going off at high speed into the trees alongside the track. In front of a huge crowd, the race was duel between the Auto Union of Stuck and the Mercedes of Fagioli trading the lead back and forth. As the track broke up, the race was decided when Fagioli had to pit to change sparkplugs with three laps to go. Stuck won by three minutes from the Italian, with Nuvolari a further minute back in third. The accompanying voiturette race saw the future world champion Giuseppe Farina in the sole Maserati hold off the Bugattis of Ernst Burggaller and Bruno Sojka, and MGs of George Eyston and Richard Seaman for a flag-to-flag victory.

Although the German teams had had a haphazard opening season, the signs of the imminent sea-change in motorsport were clear. Hans Stuck won three major races for Auto Union that countered the initial dominance of the Alfa Romeos of Scuderia Ferrari. Stuck won the German Championship, while Varzi claimed the Italian Championship. Bugatti had not been competitive this season and the win by René Dreyfus in Belgium would prove to be the last major grand prix victory for the dominant marque of the '20s. The French and Italian teams had soon realised their cars were inferior, but instead squandered time and resources on multiple designs rather than settling on one for the formula and developing that, as the German teams did. Hans Nibel, Mercedes Technical Director died of a heart attack in November, to be replaced by engineer and former driver Max Sailer.

== Race results ==
=== Drivers' race results ===
Pos	Driver	Team	MON (Monaco)	TRI (Italian Libya)	AVS (Germany)	EIF (Germany)	FRA (France)	MAR (France)	GER (Germany)	BEL (Belgium)	CAC (Italy)	SUI (Switzerland)	ITA (Italy)	ESP (Spain)	MSK (Czechoslovakia)
	(Germany) Hans Stuck	Auto Union AG			Ret	2	Ret		1		Ret [5]	**1**	2	Ret [4]	1
	(Italy) Luigi Fagioli	Daimler-Benz AG			DNS	Ret	Ret		2		1	6	Ret [1]	1	2
	(French Algeria) Guy Moll	Scuderia Ferrari	1	2	1		[3]	2	Ret		†				
	(Monaco) Louis Chiron	Scuderia Ferrari	2	3	Ret	3	1	1	3	Ret	Ret	5	4	10	Ret
	(Italy) Achille Varzi	Scuderia Ferrari	6	1	2		2	3	Ret	Ret	Ret [4]	4	Ret	5	5
	(Germany) Rudolf Caracciola	Daimler-Benz AG			DNS	DNS	Ret		Ret		Ret	[10]	1	2	Ret
	(France) René Dreyfus	Automobiles Ettore Bugatti	3	6			Ret			1		3		7	
	(Germany) Manfred von Brauchitsch	Daimler-Benz AG			DNS	1	Ret		DNS			Ret			
	(Italy) Tazio Nuvolari	Private Entry; Automobiles Ettore Bugatti	5		5	Ret	Ret	Ret	4		2	Ret	5	3	3
	(Germany) August Momberger	Auto Union AG			3	Ret	Ret		Ret			2	7		
	(Italy) Antonio Brivio	Automobiles Ettore Bugatti								2	3		DNS	11	
	(Italy) Carlo-Felice Trossi	Scuderia Ferrari	**Ret**	Ret			3						3	[Res]	
	(France) Raymond Sommer	Private Entry		Ret				Ret		3					
	(France) Robert Benoist	Automobiles Ettore Bugatti	DNS				4			4					Ret
	(Germany) Hermann zu Leiningen	Auto Union AG			Ret	Ret	DNS					Ret	Ret [2]	4	4
	(United Kingdom) Earl Howe	Private Entry	10		4			5			Ret	N/C	9		
	(Germany) Paul Pietsch	Private Entry; Auto Union AG			6	4			[Res]						
	(French Algeria) Marcel Lehoux	Scuderia Ferrari; Whitney Straight Ltd	4											8	
	(France) Philippe Étancelin	Private Entry	Ret	4			Ret	Ret							
	(United Kingdom) Hugh Hamilton	Whitney Straight Ltd		Ret		DNS		4	Ret		Ret	†			
	(Italy) Pietro Ghersi	Scuderia Ferrari									4	7			
	(Italy) Clemente Biondetti	Gruppo Genovese San Giorgio		5				Ret				8			
	(United Kingdom) Clifton Penn-Hughes	Private Entry				5					Ret				
	(Germany) Hanns Geier	Daimler-Benz AG							5			[10]			[6]
	(France) Charles Montier	Private Entry								5					
	(Germany) Wilhelm Sebastian	Auto Union AG							[Res]		5		[7]		7
	(Germany) Ernst Henne	Daimler-Benz AG					[Res]				6		Ret	[Res]	6
	(Switzerland) Ulrich Maag	Private Entry				6			DSQ						
	(Italy) Luigi Soffietti	Scuderia Siena						6	Ret					9	
	(Italy) Goffredo Zehender	Officine Alfieri Maserati		Ret			Ret	Ret	6		Ret		Ret		
	(Italy) Gianfranco Comotti	Scuderia Ferrari											6 [3]	[10]	Ret
	(France) Jean-Pierre Wimille	Automobiles Ettore Bugatti	Ret	Ret			[Ret]							6	Ret
Pos	Driver	Team	1 (Monaco)	A (Italian Libya)	B (Germany)	C (Germany)	2 (France)	D (France)	3 (Germany)	4 (Belgium)	E (Italy)	F (Switzerland)	5 (Italy)	6 (Spain)	G (Czechoslovakia)

Bold font indicates starting on pole position, while italics show the driver of the race's fastest lap.
Only those drivers with a best finish of 6th or better, or a fastest lap, are shown. Sources:

=== Manufacturers' race results ===
Pos	Manufacturer	MON (Monaco)	TRI (Italian Libya)	AVS (Germany)	EIF (Germany)	FRA (France)	MAR (France)	GER (Germany)	BEL (Belgium)	CAC (Italy)	SUI (Switzerland)	ITA (Italy)	ESP (Spain)	MSK (Czechoslovakia)
	(Italy) Alfa Romeo	1	1	1	3	1	1	3	Ret	4	4	3	5	5
	(Germany) Mercedes-Benz			DNS	1	Ret		2		1	6	1	1	2
	(Germany) Auto Union			3	2	Ret		1		5	1	2	4	1
	(Italy) Maserati	7	4	4	Ret	Ret	4	4	Ret	2	Ret	5	8	
	(France) Bugatti	3	6		7	4	5	7	Ret	3	3	9	3	8
	(United States) Duesenberg		7											
	(United States) Miller		8											

Colour	Result	Points
Gold	Winner	1
Silver	2nd place	2
Bronze	3rd place	3
Green	4th place	4
Blue	5th place	5
Purple	Other finisher / Not classified / Retired	6
Black	Disqualified	7
White	Did not start (DNS) / Reserve [Res]	7
Blank	Did not arrive	7

Citations
