= 1934 French Grand Prix =

Race details
- Date: 1 July 1934
- Official name: XXVIII Grand Prix de l'Automobile Club de France
- Location: Montlhéry, France
- Course: Autodrome de Linas-Montlhéry
- Course length: 12.50 km (7.767 miles)
- Distance: 40 laps, 500.0 km (310.7 miles)

Pole position
Driver	(Germany) Hans Stuck	Auto Union
- Grid positions set by ballot

Fastest lap
Driver	(Monaco) Louis Chiron	Alfa Romeo
- Time: 5:06.0

Podium
First	(Monaco) Louis Chiron	Alfa Romeo
Second	(Italy) Achille Varzi	Alfa Romeo
Third	(Italy) Carlo Felice Trossi; (France) Guy Moll	Alfa Romeo

The 1934 French Grand Prix (formally the XXVIII Grand Prix de l'Automobile Club de France) was a Grand Prix motor race held on 1 July 1934 at Montlhéry. The race comprised 40 laps of a 12.5 km circuit, for a total race distance of 500.0 km. This race was the first outside of Germany to see the Silver Arrows of Auto Union and Mercedes-Benz, which would go on to dominate Grand Prix racing until the start of World War II.

The race was won by Louis Chiron driving an Alfa Romeo. Chiron lead from the start, jumping the start to lead the first lap, but was quickly challenged by the Germans. Stuck, who made a poor start, was able to take the lead on lap 3, while down the field the Mercedes' and other Alfa Romeos and Auto Unions battled for the remaining places, while the Bugattis and Maseratis showed themselves to be totally outclassed. With Stuck's Auto Union slowing, Chiron retook the lead on lap 9. This he held to the end, as although he was pressured by the Mercedes of Fagioli and Caracciola, this ultimately came to nothing, as by the end of the race not a single German car was still running.

== Starting grid ==
Grid	No	Driver	Car	Note
1	10	(Germany) Hermann zu Leiningen	Auto Union A	Did not start
2	2	(Germany) Hans Stuck	Auto Union A	Raced Momberger's car
3	6	(Italy) Achille Varzi	Alfa Romeo Tipo-B P3	
4	8	(Germany) Rudolf Caracciola	Mercedes-Benz W25	
5	4	(Germany) August Momberger	Auto Union A	Raced zu Leiningen's car
6	12	(Monaco) Louis Chiron	Alfa Romeo Tipo-B P3	
7	14	(Italy) Tazio Nuvolari	Bugatti T59	
8	16	(France) Robert Benoist	Bugatti T59	
9	18	(France) René Dreyfus	Bugatti T59	
10	20	(Italy) Carlo Felice Trossi	Alfa Romeo Tipo-B P3	
11	22	(Germany) Manfred von Brauchitsch	Mercedes-Benz W25	
12	24	(Italy) Goffredo Zehender	Maserati 8C	
13	26	(France) Philippe Étancelin	Maserati 8CM	
14	30	(Italy) Luigi Fagioli	Mercedes-Benz W25	

== Classification ==
Pos	No	Driver	Car	Laps	Time/Retire
1	12	(Monaco) Louis Chiron	Alfa Romeo Tipo-B P3	40	3h39m14.6
2	6	(Italy) Achille Varzi	Alfa Romeo Tipo-B P3	40	3h42m31.9
3	20	(Italy) Carlo Felice Trossi (France) Guy Moll	Alfa Romeo Tipo-B P3	40	3h43m23.8
4	16	(France) Robert Benoist	Bugatti T59	36	+4 laps
Ret	24	(Italy) Goffredo Zehender	Maserati 8C	33	Rear axle attachment
Ret	2	(Germany) Hans Stuck	Auto Union A	32	Engine
Ret	14	(Italy) Tazio Nuvolari (France) Jean-Pierre Wimille	Bugatti T59	17	Transmission
Ret	18	(France) René Dreyfus	Bugatti T59	16	Engine
Ret	8	(Germany) Rudolf Caracciola	Mercedes-Benz W25	15	Fuel feed
Ret	30	(Italy) Luigi Fagioli	Mercedes-Benz W25	14	Brakes
Ret	22	(Germany) Manfred von Brauchitsch	Mercedes-Benz W25	11	Supercharger
Ret	26	(France) Philippe Étancelin	Maserati 8CM	11	Engine
Ret	4	(Germany) August Momberger	Auto Union A	10	Steering
DNS	10	(Germany) Hermann zu Leiningen	Auto Union A		DNS (Unwell)
DNS		(Germany) Ernst Henne	Mercedes-Benz W25		Reserve driver, practiced
DNS		(United States) Peter de Paolo	Maserati 8CM		Entered, but injured in Penya Rhin
DNS		(France) Raymond Sommer	S.E.F.A.C.		DNS

Grand Prix Race
Previous race: 1934 Monaco Grand Prix	1934 Grand Prix season Grandes Épreuves	Next race: 1934 German Grand Prix
Previous race: 1933 French Grand Prix	French Grand Prix	Next race: 1935 French Grand Prix
