= 1934 Avusrennen =

1934 motor race

- 1934 Grand Prix season
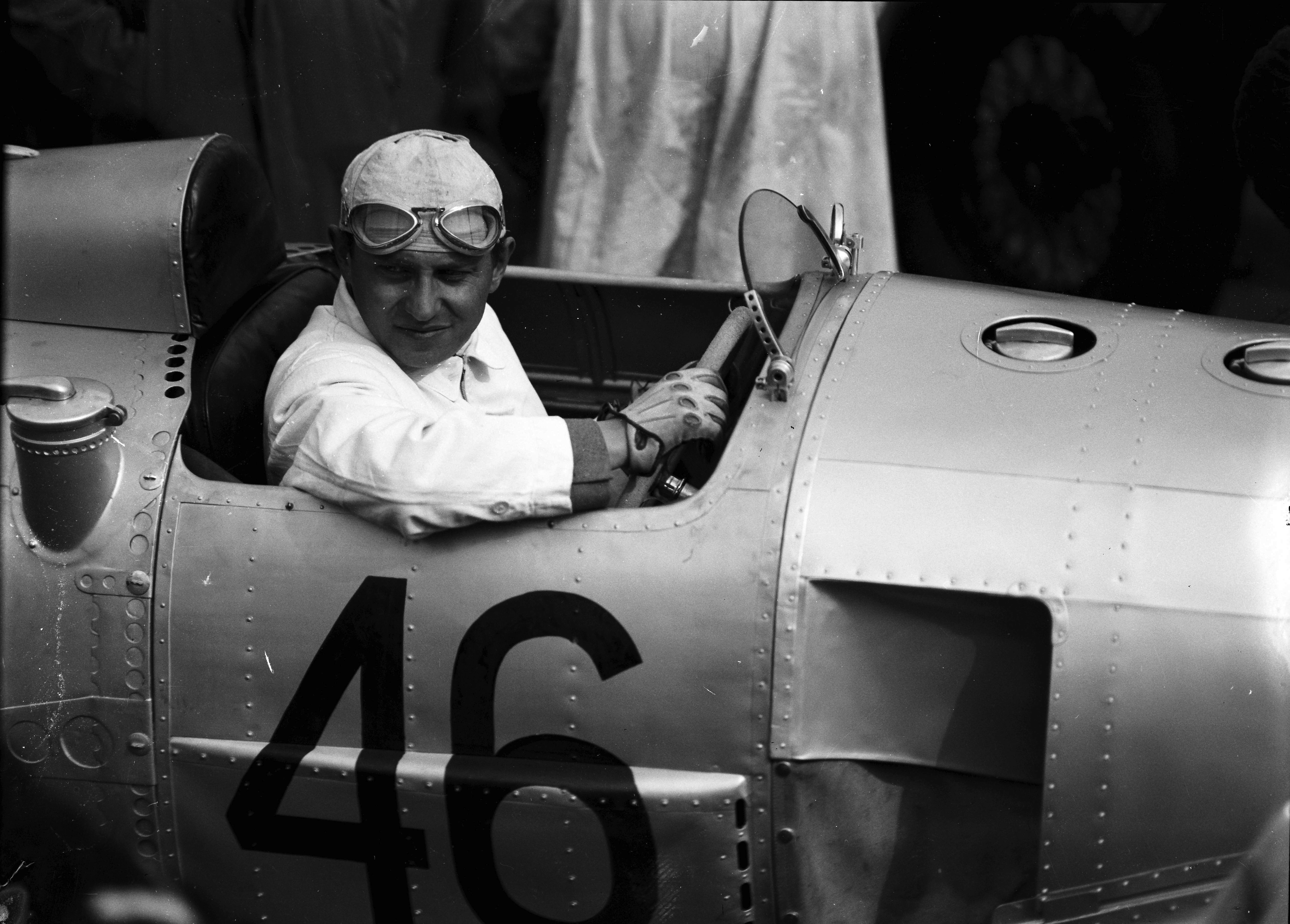
- August Momberger in his Auto Union car before the race.

Race details
- Date: 27 May 1934
- Official name: IV Internationales AVUS-Rennen
- Location: Berlin, Germany
- Course: Road course
- Course length: 19.573 km (12.162 miles)
- Distance: 15 laps, 294.426 km (182.946 miles)
- Weather: Wet, hail, overcast.
- Attendance: 200,000

Fastest lap
Driver	(Germany) August Momberger	Auto Union AG
- Time: 5:12.0 on lap 9

Podium
First	(France) Guy Moll	Scuderia Ferrari
Second	(Italy) Achille Varzi	Scuderia Ferrari
Third	(Germany) August Momberger	Auto Union AG

The 1934 Avusrennen was a non-championship Grand Prix held on 27 May 1934 at AVUS in Berlin, Germany. It was the 10th race of the 1934 Grand Prix season. The race, which was 15 laps, was won by Guy Moll driving an Alfa Romeo Tipo B/P3 after starting from 9th place.

== Background ==
The race was highly anticipated due to the new Auto Union and Mercedes-Benz cars making their first public appearances. Although the Mercedes cars had to withdraw after Practice due to an issue that meant that the fuel pump did not deliver fuel sufficiently at high speed, the top Auto Union car finished 3rd, just 1 minute and 45 seconds behind 1st place. The race saw record crowds of an estimated 200,000 spectators including top German ministers such as Adolf Hühnlein, the German Motorsport leader, who started the race. It also marked the sudden return of Rudolf Caracciola who fractured his thigh in Practice for the 1933 Manx Grand Prix and announced his retirement from racing shortly after. Tazio Nuvolari also announced his intention to race despite his left leg still being in plaster after breaking it at the 1934 Alessandria Circuit on the 21st of April.

"I only need my right leg"
"I came in second in the Montenero Race some years ago with a broken shoulder"

— Tazio Nuvolari when asked about racing with a broken leg.

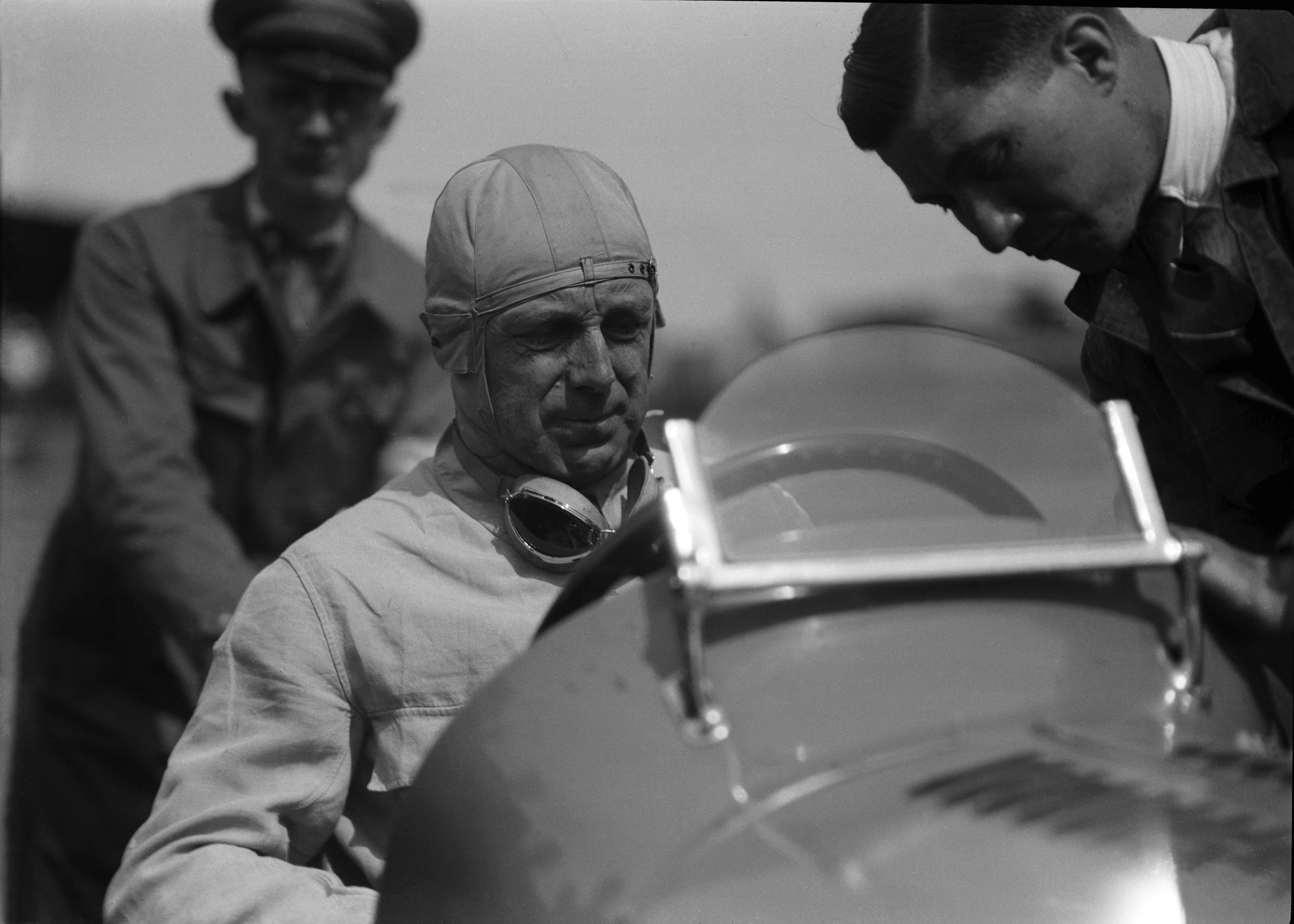
Earl Howe sitting in his Maserati 8CM, prior to the event.

== Entries ==
No.	Driver	Entrant	Car
42	Hans Stuck (DEU)	Auto Union AG	Auto Union A
44	Hermann zu Leiningen (DEU)	Auto Union AG	Auto Union A
46	August Momberger (DEU)	Auto Union AG	Auto Union A
48	Earl Howe (GBR)	Earl Howe	Maserati 8CM
50	Tazio Nuvolari (ITA)	T. Nuvolari	Maserati 8CM
52	Eugenio Siena (ITA)	Scuderia Siena	Maserati 8C-3000
54	Rudolf Caracciola (DEU)	Daimler-Benz AG	Mercedes-Benz W25
56	Manfred von Brauchitsch (DEU)	Daimler-Benz AG	Mercedes-Benz W25
58	Luigi Fagioli (ITA)	Daimler-Benz AG	Mercedes-Benz W25
60	Achille Varzi (ITA)	Scuderia Ferrari	Alfa Romeo Tipo B/P3
62	Louis Chiron (MCO)	Scuderia Ferrari	Alfa Romeo Tipo B/P3
64	Guy Moll (FRA)	Scuderia Ferrari	Alfa Romeo Tipo B/P3
66	Pete DePaolo (USA)	Frank Scully	Miller 308 4WD
68	Paul Pietsch (DEU)	P. Pietsch	Alfa Romeo Monza
70	Hans Ruesch (CHE)	H. Ruesch	Maserati 8CM
72	Goffredo Zehender (ITA)	Officine A. Maserati	Maserati 26M
74	Piero Taruffi (ITA)	Officine A. Maserati	Maserati V5
76	Robert Benoist (FRA)	Automobiles Ettore Bugatti	Bugatti T59
78	Antonio Brivio (ITA)	Automobiles Ettore Bugatti	Bugatti T59
80	René Dreyfus (FRA)	Automobiles Ettore Bugatti	Bugatti T59
82	Jean-Pierre Wimille (FRA)	Automobiles Ettore Bugatti	Bugatti T59

== Starting grid ==
The starting grid was determined by ballot and was reduced to 11 cars following the withdrawal of Daimler-Benz due to a fuel pump problem and Bugatti as the cars were not ready.

Pos.	Driver	Entrant	Car
1	Louis Chiron (MCO)	Scuderia Ferrari	Alfa Romeo Tipo B/P3
2	Earl Howe (GBR)	Earl Howe	Maserati 8CM
3	Paul Pietsch (DEU)	P. Pietsch	Alfa Romeo Monza
4	Hans Stuck (DEU)	Auto Union AG	Auto Union A
5	Pete DePaolo (USA)	Frank Scully	Miller 308 4WD
6	Achille Varzi (ITA)	Scuderia Ferrari	Alfa Romeo Tipo B/P3
7	Tazio Nuvolari (ITA)	T. Nuvolari	Maserati 8CM
8	Hermann zu Leiningen (DEU)	Auto Union AG	Auto Union A
9	August Momberger (DEU)	Auto Union AG	Auto Union A
10	Guy Moll (FRA)	Scuderia Ferrari	Alfa Romeo Tipo B/P3
11	Eugenio Siena (ITA)	Scuderia Siena	Maserati 8C-3000

== Race ==
The race was started in wet conditions by Adolf Hühnlein at 4:00 p.m.

Hans Stuck had a strong start, having a lead of over 48 seconds by the end of the first lap, which increased to 73 seconds by the end of the second lap. Eugenio Siena retired on the third lap due to a mechanical issue. By lap 4 the rain had stopped and the track began drying out. Stuck's lead had dropped to 60 seconds. By the 7th lap the track was almost dry and Stuck was still in the lead, and would continue to do so until lap 11 when he stopped for a change of tyres and to refuel, the stop lasted 1 minute and 22 seconds. Moll passed Stuck during his pit stop and Stuck rejoined 2nd. On lap 12 Stuck retired due to a clutch issue. On the last lap, Achille Varzi had suffered a puncture before the finish line, he was able to finish slowly and retained 2nd position.

Guy Moll won the race with an average speed of 205 km/h. Achille Varzi, who won the 1933 race came in second with an average speed of 201 km/h.

Pos.	Driver	Entrant	Car	Laps	Time/Retired
1	Guy Moll (FRA)	Scuderia Ferrari	Alfa Romeo Tipo B/P3	15	1:26:03.0
2	Achille Varzi (ITA)	Scuderia Ferrari	Alfa Romeo Tipo B/P3	15	1:27:30.6
3	August Momberger (DEU)	Auto Union AG	Auto Union A	15	1:27:48.6
4	Earl Howe (GBR)	Earl Howe	Maserati 8CM	15	1:35:18.6
5	Tazio Nuvolari (ITA)	T. Nuvolari	Maserati 8CM	15	1:39:09.0
6	Paul Pietsch (DEU)	P. Pietsch	Alfa Romeo Monza	15	1:44:29.4
Ret	Hans Stuck (DEU)	Auto Union AG	Auto Union A	12	Clutch
Ret	Louis Chiron (MCO)	Scuderia Ferrari	Alfa Romeo Tipo B/P3	9	Oil pipe
Ret	Hermann zu Leiningen (DEU)	Auto Union AG	Auto Union A	7	Radiator
Ret	Pete DePaolo (USA)	Frank Scully	Miller 308 4WD	5	Connecting rods
Ret	Eugenio Siena (ITA)	Scuderia Siena	Maserati 8C-3000	2	Mechanical
DNS	Rudolf Caracciola (DEU)	Daimler-Benz AG	Mercedes-Benz W25		
DNS	Manfred von Brauchitsch (DEU)	Daimler-Benz AG	Mercedes-Benz W25		
DNS	Luigi Fagioli (ITA)	Daimler-Benz AG	Mercedes-Benz W25		
DNS	Hans Ruesch (CHE)	H. Ruesch	Maserati 8CM		
DNA	Goffredo Zehender (ITA)	Officine A. Maserati	Maserati 26M		
DNA	Piero Taruffi (ITA)	Officine A. Maserati	Maserati V5		
DNA	Robert Benoist (FRA)	Automobiles Ettore Bugatti	Bugatti T59		
DNA	Antonio Brivio (ITA)	Automobiles Ettore Bugatti	Bugatti T59		
DNA	René Dreyfus (FRA)	Automobiles Ettore Bugatti	Bugatti T59		
DNA	Jean-Pierre Wimille (FRA)	Automobiles Ettore Bugatti	Bugatti T59		

Grand Prix Race
1934 Grand Prix season
Previous race: 1933 Avusrennen	Avusrennen	Next race: 1935 Avusrennen
