= 1934 Monaco Grand Prix =

6th edition of the car race

The 1934 Monaco Grand Prix (formally the VI Grand Prix de Monaco) was a Grand Prix motor race held on 2 April 1934 at Circuit de Monaco in and out of Monte Carlo. The race comprised 100 laps of a 3.180km circuit, for a total race distance of 318.0km.

The Association Internationale des Automobile Clubs Reconnus (AIACR) had announced on 12 October 1932 that a new Grand Prix formula will go into effect for the 1934 season, and the 1934 Monaco Grand Prix was the first Grand Épreuve event run under the new regulations. Although one of the new rules required the race distance to be over 500 km, Monaco GP was permitted to be run for 100 laps or 318 km, as the time required to complete 100 laps at the slow Circuit de Monaco was comparable to 500 km at faster tracks such as Monza.

The race was won by Guy Moll, a newly recruited Algerian of Scuderia Ferrari, driving an Alfa Romeo Tipo B/P3. In addition to winning the first race after the enrollment to the Ferrari team, Moll (at 23 years and 10 months old) remained the youngest driver to have won a Monaco GP until Lewis Hamilton (at 23 years and 4 months) won in 2008.

== Starting grid ==
Grid	No	Driver	Car	Qual.Time
1	22	(Italy) Carlo Felice Trossi	Alfa Romeo Tipo B/P3	1'58"
2	14	(France) Philippe Étancelin	Maserati 8CM	1'59"
3	8	(France) René Dreyfus	Bugatti T59	1'59"
4	24	(Italy) Achille Varzi	Alfa Romeo Tipo B/P3	1'59"
5	28	(Italy) Tazio Nuvolari	Bugatti T59	1'59"
6	16	(Monaco) Louis Chiron	Alfa Romeo Tipo B/P3	2'00"
7	20	(France) Guy Moll	Alfa Romeo Tipo B/P3	2'00"
8	32	(Italy) Piero Taruffi	Maserati 4C 2500	2'00"
9	10	(France) Jean-Pierre Wimille	Bugatti T59	2'00"
10	18	(France) Marcel Lehoux	Alfa Romeo Tipo B/P3	2'00"
11	4	(United Kingdom) Whitney Straight	Maserati 8CM	2'02"
12	30	(Italy) Eugenio Siena	Maserati 8C3000	2'05"
13	26	(Italy) Renato Balestrero	Alfa Romeo 8C 2600 Monza	2'05"
14	12	(France) Pierre Veyron	Bugatti T51	2'06"
15	2	(United Kingdom) Earl Howe	Maserati 8CM	2'08"

== Classification ==
Pos	No	Driver	Car	Laps	Time/Retire
1	20	(France) Guy Moll	Alfa Romeo Tipo B/P3	100	3h31m31.4
2	16	(Monaco) Louis Chiron	Alfa Romeo Tipo B/P3	100	3h32m33.4
3	8	(France) René Dreyfus	Bugatti T59	99	3h32m19s
4	18	(France) Marcel Lehoux	Alfa Romeo Tipo B/P3	99	3h33m18s
5	28	(Italy) Tazio Nuvolari	Bugatti T59	98	3h33m35s
6	24	(Italy) Achille Varzi	Alfa Romeo Tipo B/P3	98	3h33m38s
7	4	(United Kingdom) Whitney Straight	Maserati 8CM	96	3h32m00s
8	14	(Italy) Eugenio Siena	Maserati 8C 3000	96	3h32m47s
9	12	(France) Pierre Veyron	Bugatti T51	95	3h33m29s
Ret	22	(Italy) Carlo Felice Trossi	Alfa Romeo Tipo B/P3	95	Transmission
Ret	32	(Italy) Piero Taruffi	Maserati 4C 2500	91	Ignition/Fuel feed?
10	2	(United Kingdom) Earl Howe	Maserati 8CM	85	3h31m51s
Ret	14	(France) Philippe Étancelin	Maserati 8CM	63	Accident
Ret	26	(Italy) Renato Balestrero	Alfa Romeo 8C 2600 Monza	51	Differential
Ret	10	(France) Jean-Pierre Wimille	Bugatti T59	18	Brakes

Fastest Lap: (Italy) Carlo Felice Trossi (Alfa Romeo Tipo B/P3), 2m00s

Grand Prix Race
Previous race: 1933 Spanish Grand Prix	1934 Grand Prix season Grandes Épreuves	Next race: 1934 French Grand Prix
Previous race: 1933 Monaco Grand Prix	Monaco Grand Prix	Next race: 1935 Monaco Grand Prix
