= 1934 Italian Grand Prix =

Race details
- Date: 9 September 1934
- Official name: XII Gran Premio d'Italia
- Location: Autodromo Nazionale di Monza; Monza, Italy
- Course: Permanent racing facility
- Course length: 4.33 km (2.69 miles)
- Distance: 116 laps, 502.280 km (312.102 miles)

Pole position
Driver	(Germany) Rudolf Caracciola	Mercedes-Benz
- Grid positions set by ballot

Fastest lap
Driver	(Germany) Hans Stuck	Auto Union
- Time: 2:13.6

Podium
First	(Germany) Rudolf Caracciola; (Italy) Luigi Fagioli	Mercedes-Benz
Second	(Germany) Hans Stuck; (Germany) Hermann zu Leiningen	Auto Union
Third	(Italy) Carlo Felice Trossi; (Italy) Gianfranco Comotti	Alfa Romeo

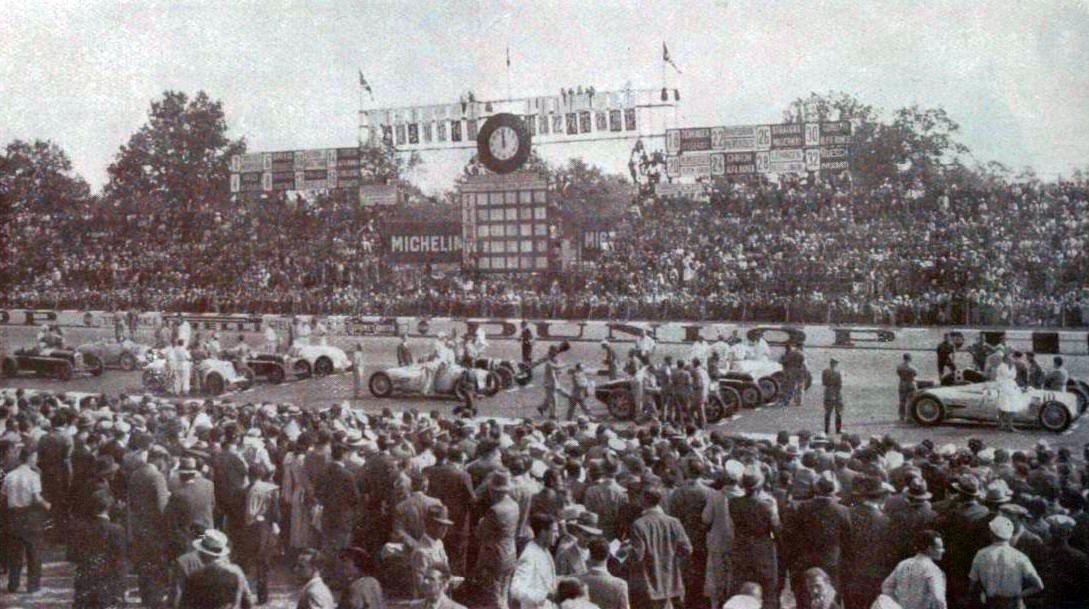
The starting grid

The 1934 Italian Grand Prix (formally the XII Gran Premio d'Italia) was a Grand Prix motor race, which was run on 9 September 1934 in Monza, Italy. The race lasted 502.28 km (4.330 x 116 laps). It was the 12th running of the Italian Grand Prix.

After the fatal accidents of the previous year, it was decided to hold the race in a different configuration, using the main straight (in both directions, linked by a very tight hairpin just before the finish line), the southern corner of the oval, the southern corner of the road circuit and two double chicanes; it was the slowest configuration ever used in Monza.

== Starting Grid (3x2) ==
Grid	No	Driver	Car
1	2	(Germany) Rudolf Caracciola	Mercedes-Benz W25
2	4	(Italy) Achille Varzi	Alfa Romeo Tipo-B P3
3	6	(Italy) Antonio Brivio	Bugatti T59
4	8	(Italy) Tazio Nuvolari	Maserati Tipo 34
5	10	(Germany) Hans Stuck	Auto Union A
6	12	(Italy) Luigi Fagioli	Mercedes-Benz W25
7	14	(Italy) Carlo Felice Trossi	Alfa Romeo Tipo-B P3
8	16	(United Kingdom) Earl Howe	Bugatti T51
9	18	(Italy) Goffredo Zehender	Maserati 8CM
10	20	(Germany) August Momberger	Auto Union A
11	22	(Germany) Ernst Henne	Mercedes-Benz W25
12	24	(Monaco) Louis Chiron	Alfa Romeo Tipo-B P3
13	26	(United Kingdom) Whitney Straight	Maserati 8CM
14	28	(Germany) Hermann zu Leiningen	Auto Union A
15	30	(Italy) Gianfranco Comotti	Alfa Romeo Tipo-B P3
16	32	(Switzerland) Hans Ruesch	Maserati 8CM

== Classifications ==
Pos	No	Driver	Car	Laps	Time/Retire
1 SHR	2	(Germany) Rudolf Caracciola	Mercedes-Benz W25	116	4h45m47s
1 SHR	2	(Italy) Luigi Fagioli	Mercedes-Benz W25	116	4h45m47s
2 SHR	10	(Germany) Hans Stuck	Auto Union A	115	+1 lap 4h47m25.2s
2 SHR	10	(Germany) Hermann zu Leiningen	Auto Union A	115	+1 lap 4h47m25.2s
3 SHR	14	(Italy) Carlo Felice Trossi	Alfa Romeo Tipo B/P3	114	+2 laps 4h45m49.4s
3 SHR	14	(Italy) Gianfranco Comotti	Alfa Romeo Tipo B/P3	114	+2 laps 4h45m49.4s
4	24	(Monaco) Louis Chiron	Alfa Romeo Tipo B/P3	113	+3 laps 4h45m49.2s
5	8	(Italy) Tazio Nuvolari	Maserati 6C34	113	+3 laps 4h46m46.4s
6 SHR	30	(Italy) Gianfranco Comotti	Alfa Romeo Tipo B/P3	113	+3 laps 4h47m27.8s
6 SHR	30	(Italy) Attilio Marinoni	Alfa Romeo Tipo B/P3	113	+3 laps 4h47m27.8s
7 SHR	20	(Germany) August Momberger	Auto Union A	112	+4 laps 4h47m27.2s
7 SHR	20	(Germany) Wilhelm Sebastian	Auto Union A	112	+4 laps 4h47m27.2s
8	26	(United Kingdom) Whitney Straight	Maserati 8CM	112	+4 laps 4h47m27.6s
DSQ	32	(Switzerland) Hans Ruesch	Maserati 8CM	105	+11 laps Outside assistance
9	16	(United Kingdom) Earl Howe	Bugatti T51	104	+12 laps 4h48m28.6s
Ret SHR	4	(Italy) Achille Varzi	Alfa Romeo Tipo B/P3	97	Gearbox
Ret SHR	4	(Italy) Mario Tadini	Alfa Romeo Tipo B/P3	97	Gearbox
Ret	18	(Italy) Goffredo Zehender	Maserati 8CM	54	Brakes
Ret	28	(Germany) Hermann zu Leiningen	Auto Union A	54	Out of fuel
Ret	12	(Italy) Luigi Fagioli	Mercedes-Benz W25	13	Supercharger
Ret	22	(Germany) Ernst Henne	Mercedes-Benz W25	2	Overheating/Supercharger?
DNS	6	(Italy) Antonio Brivio	Bugatti T59	0	Supercharger

Fastest Lap: (Germany) Hans Stuck (Auto Union A), 2'13.6", on lap 5

Grand Prix Race
Previous race: 1934 Belgian Grand Prix	1934 Grand Prix season Grandes Épreuves	Next race: 1934 Spanish Grand Prix
Previous race: 1933 Italian Grand Prix	Italian Grand Prix	Next race: 1935 Italian Grand Prix
