= 1934 Belgian Grand Prix =

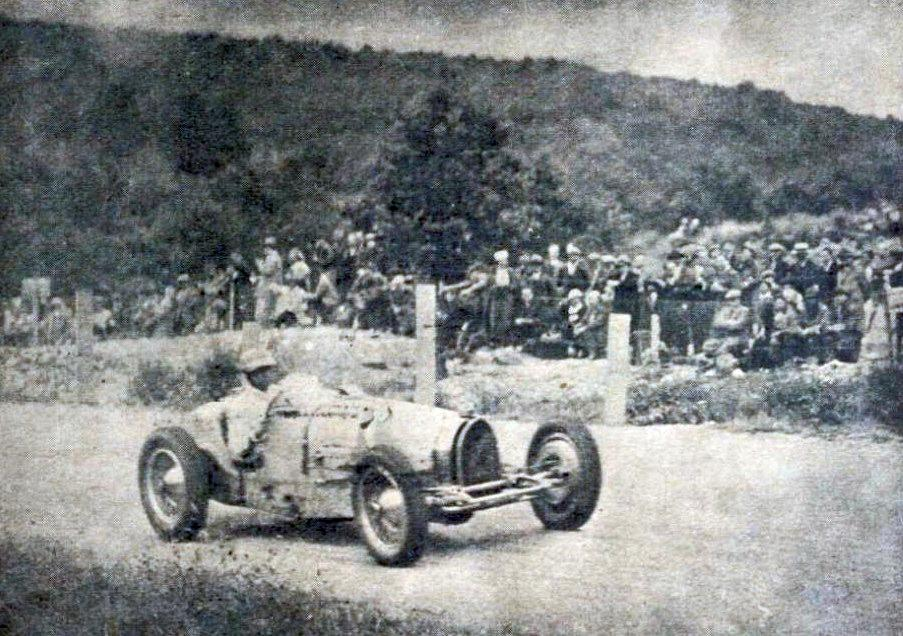
René Dreyfus, winner of the 1934 Grand Prix.

The 1934 Belgian Grand Prix (formally the V Grand Prix de Belgique) was a Grand Prix motor race of the 1934 Grand Prix season which was run on 29 July 1934 at the Circuit de Spa-Francorchamps, Belgium.

The Belgian-German border until the 1920s was near the bridge over Eau Rouge and near the Meiz road on the Malmedy straight. Then Belgium annexed Ostbelgien, the circuit was created, and the empty customs office was called Ancienne Douane. Before the 1934 GP race, Belgian customs asked the German teams of Auto Union and Mercedes-Benz to pay 180,000 Belgian franc duty for the alcohol based special fuel they brought. 48 hours before the start the German teams therefore withdrew their entries. Tazio Nuvolari and other Maserati 8CM were absent, too.

The race lasted 596.05 km (14.90 km x 40 laps). It was the fifth running of the Belgian Grand Prix. The Alfas were leading, but had retired before lap 30. Thus Bugatti won 1-2, the last major victory of the brand.

== Classification ==
Pos	No	Driver	Car	Laps	Time/Retire
1	4	(France) René Dreyfus	Bugatti T59	40	4:15:03.8
2	6	(Italy) Antonio Brivio	Bugatti T59	40	+1:51.0
3	12	(France) Raymond Sommer	Maserati 8CM	40	+1 lap
4	2	(France) Robert Benoist	Bugatti T59	40	+3 laps
5	24	(France) Charles Montier	Montier Speciale-Ford	40	+10 laps
Ret	16	(Italy) Achille Varzi	Alfa Romeo P3 Tipo-B	25	Engine
Ret	14	(Monaco) Louis Chiron	Alfa Romeo Tipo-B P3	20	Crash
DNS	8	(Germany) Hans Stuck	Auto Union A		Team withdrew
DNS	10	(Germany) August Momberger	Auto Union A		Team withdrew
DNS	18	(Germany) Rudolf Caracciola	Mercedes-Benz W25		Team withdrew
DNS	20	(Italy) Luigi Fagioli	Mercedes-Benz W25		Team withdrew
DNS	22	(Germany) Manfred von Brauchitsch	Mercedes-Benz W25		Team withdrew

Fastest Lap: (Italy) Antonio Brivio (Bugatti T59), 5:45.0

Grand Prix Race
Previous race: 1934 German Grand Prix	1934 Grand Prix season Grandes Épreuves	Next race: 1934 Italian Grand Prix
Previous race: 1933 Belgian Grand Prix	Belgian Grand Prix	Next race: 1935 Belgian Grand Prix
