= Hermann zu Leiningen =

German racing driver (1901–71)

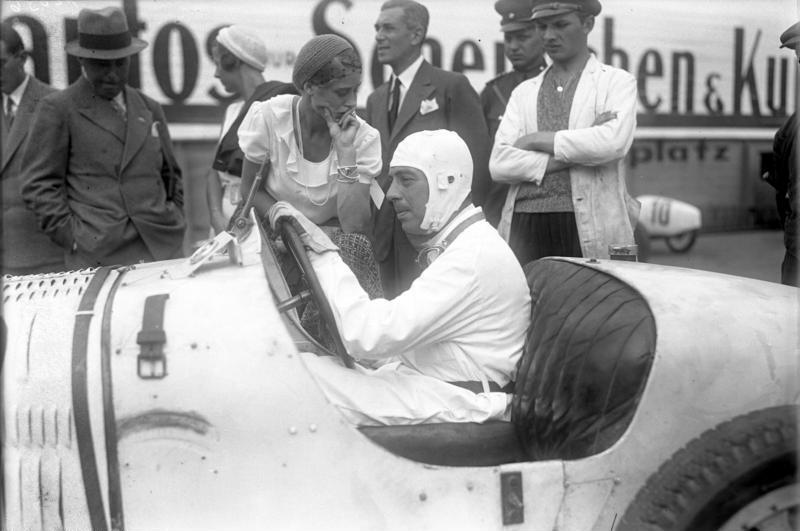
- At the 1931 Avusrennen
- Born: Hermann Viktor Maximilian Prinz zu Leiningen; 4 January 1901 Amorbach, Germany
- Died: 29 March 1971 (aged 70)

Hermann zu Leiningen (4 January 1901 – 29 March 1971) was a German racing driver, active before the Second World War. Leiningen was the third son of Emich, the fifth Prince of Leiningen.

== Career ==
Leiningen started racing in 1927, driving a Bugatti, and in 1930 formed a team - the German Bugatti Team - with Heinrich-Joachim von Morgen and Ernst Burggaller. In September that year he gained his greatest success, in winning the 1930 Masarykuv Okruh, in effect the first Czech Grand Prix, albeit in a shared drive, as von Morgen - who was leading - had damaged his Bugatti irretrievably, and took over zu Leningen's car to bring it to the lead.

Zu Leiningen made his Grand Prix debut at the 1931 Monaco Grand Prix, in his Bugatti Type 35C, retiring with ten laps to go while running 8th and last.

Leiningen was recruited for the new Auto Union team in 1934, making his marque debut at the Avusrennen that year. He should have made his marque Grand Prix debut at the 1934 French Grand Prix, and the lottery put him on pole position, but he withdrew from the race, feeling unwell. He did start the Italian Grand Prix, retiring at half-distance; when race leader Hans Stuck required relief after a design flaw resulted in hot water pipes burning Stuck's feet - while he received treatment (and sought a larger pair of boots), Leiningen drove in relief, but in his ten laps at the wheel the Auto Union dropped from first to fourth. Stuck returned to the car and brought it back to second by the finish. Leiningen's next Grand Prix start was at the 1934 Spanish Grand Prix, and he was running a lowly 10th when he was called in to hand his car over to Stuck, whose own car had retired earlier; Stuck set fastest lap en route to 4th position.

Leiningen missed the German Grand Prix through illness, and his final Grande Epreuve start, at the 1934 Masaryk Grand Prix at Brno, was perhaps his best race, finishing 4th, nine minutes behind winner Stuck after four hours of racing.

It had become apparent that Leiningen lacked the skills required to drive at the highest levels, so after the 1934 season Auto Union undertook a recruitment exercise, and Leiningen was reduced to reserve driver. His last race for the team was at the 1935 Eifelrennen, bringing Achille Varzi's car to the finish after Varzi, who had recently been suffering from appendicitis, withdrew after the 8th lap; his last single-seater races came for the works E.R.A. outfit later in the year, having been invited over to drive chassis R1A in the 1935 British Empire Trophy at Brooklands, and he took the same chassis to 12th at the Prix de Berne at Bremgarten that August.
