= Eugenio Siena =

Italian racecar driver (1905–1938)

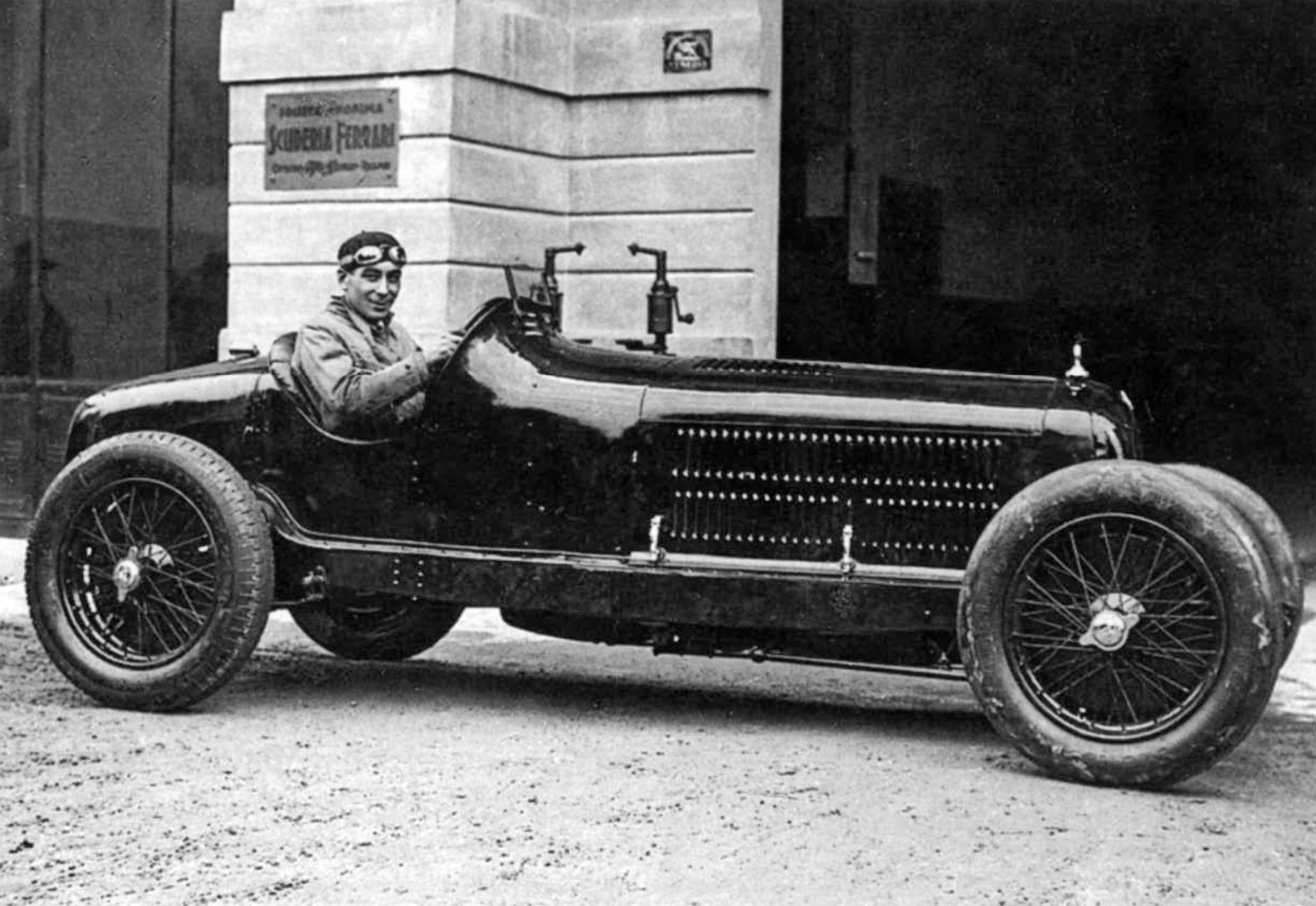
Racing driver Eugenio Siena in what seems to be an Alfa Romeo 8C 2300 "Monza"

Eugenio Siena (1 April 1905 - 15 May 1938) was an Italian racecar driver from Milan.

A cousin of Giuseppe Campari, he was a mechanic and testdriver for Alfa Romeo (assistant to Enzo Ferrari). Next, he joined Scuderia Ferrari 1930–34. Siena won the 1932 Spa 24 Hours with Antonio Brivio in Alfa Romeo 8C, and Mille Miglia with Tazio Nuvolari in 1934. He managed the Scuderia Siena team and raced Maserati 1934–36, then voiturette.

He died in an accident at the 1938 Tripoli Grand Prix, driving a Tipo 312.
