= Ernst Henne =

German car and motorcycle racer

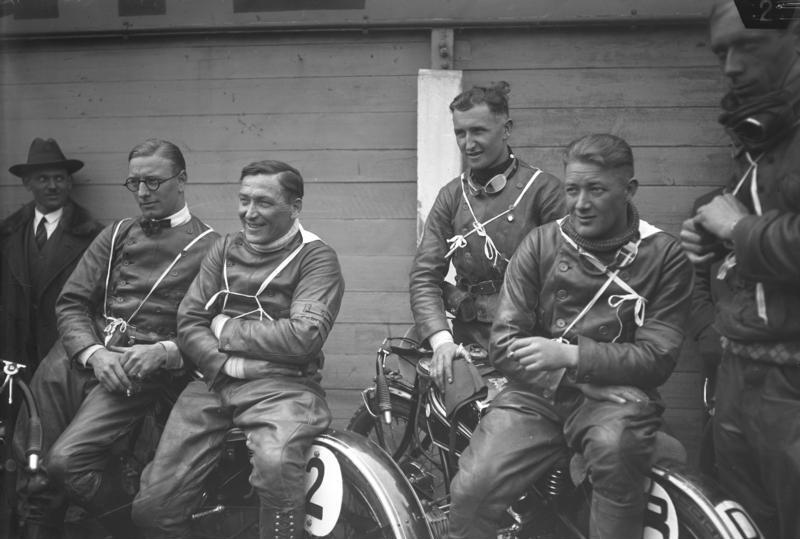
- Ernst Jakob Henne, September 1930 (Fourth from left)
- Born: Ernst Jakob Henne; 22 February 1904; Weiler, near Wangen im Allgäu, Germany
- Died: 23 May 2005 (aged 101); Canary Islands
- Occupations: Motorcycle racer, Racecar driver
- Known for: Land speed world records, Motorcycle racing achievements

Ernst Jakob Henne (22 February 1904 – 23 May 2005 (aged 101) ) was a German motorcycle racer and racecar driver.

Henne was born in the village of Weiler, near Wangen im Allgäu. His father was a saddlemaker. In 1919, Henne was apprenticed to a become a motor vehicle mechanic. He started racing in 1923 in Mühldorf, finishing third on a Megola in his first race. In 1925, he competed in the Monza Grand Prix, his first major international event, where he placed sixth in the 350cc class.

== Career ==
Henne soon became one of the most successful German motorcycle racers. After joining the BMW works team, he became the 1926 German champion in the 500cc class, 1927 German champion in the 750cc class and the 1928 winner of the Targa Florio.

Starting on 9 September 1929 at 216.6 km/h (134.6 mph) on a supercharged 750 cc BMW, Henne achieved a total of 76 land speed world records, increasing his speed annually from 1929 to 1937. His last motorcycle land speed record was set on 28 November 1937 with a speed of 279.5 km/h (173.7 mph) on a fully faired 500cc supercharged BMW. This record stood for 14 years. Henne competed in the International Six Days Trial, and was a member of the winning German teams of 1933, 1934, and 1935.

=== Cars ===
Henne was recruited to the Mercedes-Benz Grand Prix motor racing team in 1934, although he only took part in two Grands Prix, driving a Mercedes-Benz W25; the 1934 Italian Grand Prix, in which he retired on the third lap, and the 1934 Czech Grand Prix, during which he fell ill, Hanns Geier taking over the car during the race and bringing it home sixth. He then moved into sports cars, winning the two-litre class of the 1936 Eifelrennen in the first appearance of the BMW 328. He missed out on a place with the BMW team at the 1937 24 Hours of Le Mans after being injured in that year's Eifelrennen.

== World War II ==
Having earned his pilot's licence in 1932, Henne was conscripted by the Luftwaffe during World War II, but was declared unfit due to the skull fractures and concussions he had suffered during his racing career. After the war, he developed a contract workshop with Mercedes-Benz. In 1991, he founded the Ernst-Jakob-Henne Foundation to help innocent victims of misfortune.

== Later life and death ==
From 1996 until his death in 2005 at the age of 101, Henne lived in retirement with his wife on the Canary Islands.

== See also ==
- List of motorcycles of the 1920s
