= 1932 Tunis Grand Prix =

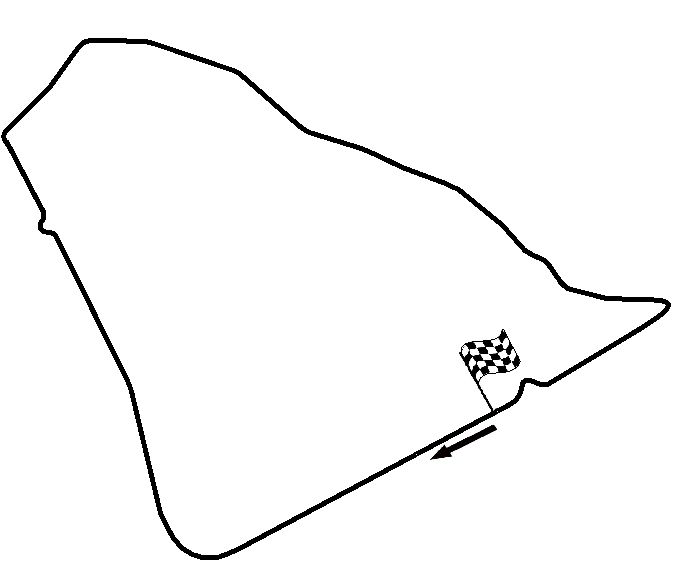

Race details
- Date: 3 April 1932
- Official name: IV Grand Prix de Tunisie
- Location: Carthage Street Circuit; Tunis, French protectorate of Tunisia
- Course: Street circuit
- Course length: 12.714 km (7.9 miles)
- Distance: 37 laps, 470.4 km (292.3 miles)
- Weather: Warm, sunshine

Pole position
Driver	(France) Marcel Lehoux	Bugatti
- Grid positions set by car number

Fastest lap
Driver	(Monaco) Louis Chiron	Bugatti
- Time: 5:03

Podium
First	(Italy) Achille Varzi	Bugatti
Second	(France) Marcel Lehoux	Bugatti
Third	(France) Philippe Étancelin	Alfa Romeo

The 1932 Tunis Grand Prix was a Grand Prix motor race held at the Carthage Street Circuit in Tunis, the capital of colonial Tunisia, on 17 April 1932. Achille Varzi, in a privateer Bugatti, won the 37-lap race ahead of fellow Bugatti driver Marcel Lehoux, with Philippe Étancelin, in an Alfa Romeo, claiming third position. The leading drivers in the voiturette class were Louis Joly, Pierre Veyron and Luigi Castelbarco.

== Entries ==
No	Driver	Entrant	Constructor	Chassis	Engine
2	(France) Marcel Lehoux	Private entry	Bugatti	Bugatti T54	5.0 L8
4	(France) Jean-Pierre Wimille	Private entry	Bugatti	Bugatti T54	5.0 L8
6	(Italy) Luigi Fagioli	Officine A. Maserati	Maserati	Maserati 8C 2800	2.8 L8
8	(France) René Dreyfus	Officine A. Maserati	Maserati	Maserati 8C 2800	2.8 L8
10	(France) Philippe Étancelin	Private entry	Alfa Romeo	Alfa Romeo Monza	2.3 L8
12	(Poland) Stanisłas Czaykowski	Private entry	Bugatti	Bugatti T51	2.3 L8
14	(France) Jean de Maleplane	Private entry	Maserati	Maserati 26M	2.5 L8
16	(Italy) Eugenio Siena	Scuderia Ferrari	Alfa Romeo	Alfa Romeo Monza	2.3 L8
18	(Italy) Achille Varzi	Private entry	Bugatti	Bugatti T51	2.3 L8
20	(Germany) Heinrich-Joachim von Morgen	Private entry	Bugatti	Bugatti T54	5.0 L8
22	(Monaco) Louis Chiron	Private entry	Bugatti	Bugatti T51	2.3 L8
24	(France) Jean Gaupillat	Private entry	Bugatti	Bugatti T51	2.3 L8
26	(Austria) Charly Jellen	Private entry	Bugatti	Bugatti T35B	2.3 L8
28	(Italy) Clemente Biondetti	Private entry	MB-Speciale	MB-Speciale	2.5 L8
30	(Italy) Luigi Castelbarco	Private entry	Bugatti	Bugatti T51A	1.5 L8
32	Rudolf Eberhardt	Private entry	Bugatti	Bugatti T37A	1.5 L4
34	Jean Gallay	Private entry	Bugatti	Bugatti T37A	1.5 L4
36	(France) Mme Anne Rose-Itier	Private entry	Bugatti	Bugatti T37A	1.5 L4
38	(France) Pierre Veyron	Private entry	Maserati	Maserati 26	1.5 L8
40	Claude Ozannat	Private entry	Bugatti	Bugatti T37A	1.5 L4
42	Jean d'Hiercourt	Private entry	Maserati	Maserati 26C	1.1 L8
44	Louis Joly	Private entry	Maserati in motorsport	Maserati 26	1.5 L8
46	(France) Marguerite Mareuse	Private entry	Bugatti	Bugatti T37A	1.5 L4
48	(France) José Scaron	Private entry	Amilcar	Amilcar MCO	1.1 L6

- Pink background denotes entries in the voiturette class.

== Starting grid ==
Grid positions were allocated in numerical order.

Starting grid — 1932 Tunis Grand Prix
		(France) Lehoux; Bugatti
	(France) Wimille; Bugatti	(France) Lehoux; Bugatti
(Italy) Fagioli; Maserati	(France) Wimille; Bugatti	
		(France) Dreyfus; Maserati
	(France) Étancelin; Alfa Romeo	(France) Dreyfus; Maserati
(Poland) Czaykowski; Bugatti	(France) Étancelin; Alfa Romeo	
		(France) de Maleplane; Maserati
	(Italy) Siena; Alfa Romeo	(France) de Maleplane; Maserati
(Italy) Varzi; Bugatti	(Italy) Siena; Alfa Romeo	
		(Germany) von Morgen; Bugatti
	(Monaco) Chiron; Bugatti	(Germany) von Morgen; Bugatti
(France) Gaupillat; Bugatti	(Monaco) Chiron; Bugatti	
		Eberhardt; Bugatti
	Gallay; Bugatti	Eberhardt; Bugatti
(Italy) Castelbarco; Bugatti	Gallay; Bugatti	
		(France) Rose-Itier; Bugatti
	(France) Veyron; Maserati	(France) Rose-Itier; Bugatti
Ozannat; Bugatti	(France) Veyron; Maserati	
		Joly; Maserati
	(France) Mareuse; Bugatti	Joly; Maserati
(France) Scaron; Amilcar	(France) Mareuse; Bugatti	

- Pink background denotes entries in the voiturette class.

== Classification ==
=== Race ===
Pos	No	Driver	Car	Laps	Time/Retired	Grid
1	18	(Italy) Achille Varzi	Bugatti T51	37	3:14:18	9
2	2	(France) Marcel Lehoux	Bugatti T54	37	+2:56	1
3	10	(France) Philippe Étancelin	Alfa Romeo Monza	37	+4:07	5
4	16	(Italy) Eugenio Siena	Alfa Romeo Monza	37	+5:40	8
5	12	(Poland) Stanisłas Czaykowski	Bugatti T51	37	+7:00	6
6	22	(Monaco) Louis Chiron	Bugatti T51	37	+10:24	11
7	8	(France) René Dreyfus	Maserati 8C 2800	37	+13:31	4
8	14	(France) Jean de Maleplane	Maserati 26M	37	+18:37	7
9	44	Louis Joly	Maserati 26	37	+20:14	19
10	38	(France) Pierre Veyron	Maserati 26	37	+22:57	17
11	30	(Italy) Luigi Castelbarco	Bugatti T51A	37	+24:38	15
12	48	(France) José Scaron	Amilcar MCO	37	+30:52	21
13	36	(France) Mme Anne Rose-Itier	Bugatti T37A	35	+2 laps	16
14	46	(France) Marguerite Mareuse	Bugatti T37A	34	+3 laps	20
Ret	32	Rudolf Eberhardt	Bugatti T37A	27	Brakes	13
Ret	6	(Italy) Luigi Fagioli	Maserati 8C 2800	15	Supercharger	3
Ret	40	Claude Ozannat	Bugatti T37A	15	?	18
Ret	4	(France) Jean-Pierre Wimille	Bugatti T54	15	Oil pressure, brakes	2
Ret	20	(Germany) Heinrich-Joachim von Morgen	Bugatti T54	11	Brakes	10
Ret	34	Jean Gallay	Bugatti T37A	11	Overheating	14
Ret	24	(France) Jean Gaupillat	Bugatti T51	?	?	12
DNA	26	(Austria) Charly Jellen	Bugatti T35B		Did not arrive	
DNA	28	(Italy) Clemente Biondetti	MB-Speciale		Did not arrive	
DNA	42	Jean d'Hiercourt	Maserati 26C		Did not arrive	
Sources:

- Pink background denotes entries in the voiturette class.

Grand Prix Race
1932 Grand Prix season
Previous race: 1931 Tunis Grand Prix	Tunis Grand Prix	Next race: 1933 Tunis Grand Prix
