= 1933 Pau Grand Prix =

Race details
- Date: 19 February 1933
- Official name: II Grand Prix de Pau
- Location: Pau, France
- Course: Temporary Street Circuit
- Course length: 2.760 km (1.720 miles)
- Distance: 80 laps, 211.920 km (131.700 miles)

Pole position
Driver	(France) Guy Moll	Bugatti T51
- Time: Determined by heats

Fastest lap
Driver	(France) Philippe Étancelin	Alfa Romeo Monza
- Time: 2:01.0

Podium
First	(France) Marcel Lehoux	Bugatti T51
Second	(France) Guy Moll	Bugatti T51
Third	(France) Philippe Étancelin	Alfa Romeo Monza

The 1933 Pau Grand Prix was a motor race held on 19 February 1933 at the Pau circuit, in Pau, Pyrénées-Atlantiques, France. It was the inaugural Pau Grand Prix (i.e. the first race that actually held Grand Prix de Pau title), although the numbering of the races may not have reflected this due to a confusion about the 1901 race at Pau. The Grand Prix was won by Marcel Lehoux, driving the Bugatti T51. Guy Moll finished second and Philippe Étancelin third.

== Classification ==
=== Race ===
Pos	No	Driver	Vehicle	Laps	Time/Retired	Grid
1	6	(France) Marcel Lehoux	Bugatti T51	80	2hr 54min 06.8sec	15
2	18	(France) Guy Moll	Bugatti T51	80	+ 59.8 s	1
3	4	(France) Philippe Étancelin	Alfa Romeo Monza	80	+ 1:17.4 s	7
4	26	(France) René Dreyfus	Bugatti T51	80	+ 1:39.2 s	11
5	36	(France) Guy Bouriat	Bugatti T51	80	+ 2:43.2 s	10
6	14	(France) Louis Trintignant	Bugatti T35C	79	+ 1 lap	14
7	30	(France) Jean de Maleplane	Maserati 26M	76	+ 4 laps	3
8	34	(France) Marcel Jacob	Bugatti T35C	75	+ 5 laps	9
9	12	(France) Jean Delorme	Bugatti T35C	62	+ 18 laps	6
Ret	2	(Poland) Stanisław Czaykowski	Bugatti T51A	55	Rear axle	4
Ret	16	(France) Pierre Félix	Alfa Romeo Monza	55	Mechanical	2
Ret	22	(France) Paul Morand	Bugatti T35B	50	Mechanical	13
Ret	28	(France) Jean Gaupillat	Bugatti T51	50	Mechanical	5
Ret	8	(France) Honoré Lormand	Bugatti T35C	30	Gearbox	12
Ret	24	(France) Robert Brunet	Bugatti T51	30	Accident	16
Ret	20	(France) Benoit Falchetto	Bugatti T35B	0	Mechanical	8

Preceded by Inaugural	Pau Grand Prix; 1933	Succeeded by 1935 Pau Grand Prix
