= 1933 French Grand Prix =

Race details
- Date: 11 June 1933
- Official name: XXVII Grand Prix de l'Automobile Club de France
- Location: Montlhéry, France
- Course: Autodrome de Linas-Montlhéry
- Course length: 12.50 km (7.767 miles)
- Distance: 40 laps, 500.0 km (310.7 miles)

Pole position
Driver	(United Kingdom) Earl Howe	Bugatti
- Grid positions set by car number

Fastest lap
Driver	(Italy) Giuseppe Campari	Maserati
- Time: 5:23.0 on lap 39

Podium
First	(Italy) Giuseppe Campari	Maserati
Second	(France) Philippe Étancelin	Alfa Romeo
Third	(United Kingdom) George Eyston	Alfa Romeo

The 1933 French Grand Prix was a Grand Prix motor race held on 11 June 1933, in Autodrome de Linas-Montlhéry. Organized by the French Automobile Club, it was XXVII running of the Grand Prix de l'Automobile Club de France. The race, which was held over 40 laps, was won by the Italian driver Giuseppe Campari in a privately entered Maserati. It was Campari's final victory, as he was killed just three months later at the 1933 Italian Grand Prix. Philippe Étancelin and George Eyston, both in privateer Alfa Romeos, finished in second and third, respectively.

== Background ==
In an attempt to attract more entrants, the Automobile Club de France (ACF) changed the event's registration fees and prize money. Registration fees had previously been 2,000–3,000 francs (F), but were reduced to just 100 F for the 1933 race. Prizes of 100,000 F, 50,000 F and 20,000 F were offered to the first three finishers, while there were also bonus prizes for drivers who had completed 10, 20 or 30 laps. The magnitude of the bonuses were dependent on a driver's average speed (3,000 F for 125 km/h, 2,000 F for 115 km/h, 1,000 F for 105 km/h).

Problems with the grandstand at Montlhéry placed the event's staging in jeopardy. Repairs, estimated at 500,000–800,000 F, needed to be carried out before the race could take place.

The race was also affected by the absence of a number of notable drivers. Frédéric Toselli, Louis Trintignant (brother of the future Formula One driver Maurice), and Guy Bouriat, all of whom had entered the French Grand Prix, had all been killed at previous events in May. In addition, Rudolf Caracciola was still recovering from a broken thigh, an injury which had been incurred at Monaco, while Tim Birkin was ill with blood poisoning after being burnt at Tripoli. On top of that, the works Bugatti team—including drivers Achille Varzi, Albert Divo, William Grover-Williams and René Dreyfus—were forced to pull out of the event because their cars were not ready.

== Report ==
Tazio Nuvolari's participation in the race was in doubt when his car was damaged during Saturday practice. It is thought that his Scuderia Ferrari teammate, Baconin Borzacchini, allowed Nuvolari to swap the cars that were assigned to them, meaning that Nuvolari took the #10 Alfa, while Borzacchini was now due to drive car #14 (which had a broken blower shaft). Just ten minutes before the start of the race, the team's mechanics pushed Borzacchini's car (#14) off the grid, putting Piero Taruffi's #38 Alfa in its place. As such, Taruffi was able to start three rows further forward than he otherwise would have.

Nuvolari, from fifth on the grid, took the lead early on, while Campari followed eight seconds behind, after having made up nine positions on lap one. Taruffi and Zehender from the third row of the grid, were in third and fourth, respectively, followed by Chiron and Étancelin, who had both made significant gains in the early stages. Chiron and Étancelin both overtook the Maserati of Zehender during lap two, and two laps later, the pair also passed Taruffi, who had been deliberately holding them up. After four laps, Nuvolari and Campari were still in front, while Chiron was up to third, ahead of Philippe Étancelin, while Taruffi and Zehender were not far behind. Both Nuvolari and Chiron pitted after six laps, although neither lasted long after rejoining the race, leaving Campari in first place, with a lead of over half a minute over Taruffi and Étancelin after eight laps. Campari made a pitstop after thirteen laps, handing the lead briefly to Étancelin, before the Frenchman was overtaken by Taruffi. After sixteen laps, Campari was approximately half a minute behind, but by the end of the nineteenth lap he had retaken the lead. At half distance, Campari led from Taruffi, with Sommer and Étancelin in third and fourth, respectively. Soon after, Taruffi pulled into the pits, and his car eventually rejoined the race, now driven by Nuvolari, who after twenty-four laps was in fourth place, behind Campari, Étancelin and Moll. Nuvolari was promoted into third when Moll made a lengthy pitstop, while Eyston was up to fourth. On lap twenty-six, Nuvolari was once again forced to retire, leaving just six cars in the race. Another pitstop for Campari allowed Étancelin to take a half-minute lead, although, by lap thirty-six, the gap had been reduced to just three seconds. However, when rain began to fall, Campari took to the pits once again to change tyres, increasing his deficit to Étancelin to a full minute. With one lap remaining, the gap had been reduced to 23.2 seconds. With Étancelin unable to change gears, Campari was able to take the lead, and shortly after, the win, which was his final victory, and Maserati's first in a Grande Épreuve. Étancelin took second, ahead of Eyston in his Alfa Romeo. Sommer, Moll and Villars were final cars to finish.

== Entries ==
No	Driver	Entrant	Constructor	Chassis	Engine
2	(United Kingdom) Earl Howe	Private entry	Bugatti	Bugatti T51	2.3 L8
4	(France) Pierre Félix	Private entry	Alfa Romeo	Alfa Romeo Monza	2.3 L8
6	(Chile) Juan Zanelli	Private entry	Alfa Romeo	Alfa Romeo Monza	2.3 L8
8	(Switzerland) Julio Villars	Equipe Villars	Alfa Romeo	Alfa Romeo Monza	2.3 L8
10	(Italy) Tazio Nuvolari	Scuderia Ferrari	Alfa Romeo	Alfa Romeo Monza	2.6 L8
12	(Italy) Goffredo Zehender (Italy) Luigi Fagioli	Maserati	Maserati	Maserati 8CM	3.0 L8
14	(Italy) Baconin Borzacchini	Scuderia Ferrari	Alfa Romeo	Alfa Romeo Monza	2.6 L8
16	(Italy) Achille Varzi	Automobiles E. Bugatti	Bugatti	Bugatti T59	2.8 L8
18	(United Kingdom) George Eyston	Bernard Rubin	Alfa Romeo	Alfa Romeo Monza	2.3 L8
20	(France) Albert Divo	Automobiles E. Bugatti	Bugatti	Bugatti T51	2.3 L8
22	(Poland) Stanisłas Czaykowski	Count Czaykowski	Bugatti	Bugatti T54	5.0 L8
24	(France) Pierre Bussienne	Private entry	Bugatti	Bugatti T51	2.3 L8
26	(France) Philippe Étancelin	Private entry	Alfa Romeo	Alfa Romeo Monza	2.3 L8
28	(Switzerland) Karl von Waldthausen	Equipe Villars	Alfa Romeo	Alfa Romeo Monza	2.3 L8
30	(United Kingdom) William Grover-Williams	Automobiles E. Bugatti	Bugatti	Bugatti T51	2.3 L8
32	(Italy) Giuseppe Campari	Private entry	Maserati	Maserati 8C-3000	3.0 L8
34	(Romania) Prince Nicolas	Nicolas/Romania	Bugatti	?	?
36	(France) Jean Gaupillat	Private entry	Bugatti	Bugatti T51	2.3 L8
38	(Italy) Piero Taruffi	Scuderia Ferrari	Alfa Romeo	Alfa Romeo Monza	2.6 L8
40	(France) Benoît Falchetto	Private entry	Bugatti	?	?
42	(Monaco) Louis Chiron	Scuderia CC	Alfa Romeo	Alfa Romeo Monza	2.3 L8
44	(France) Marcel Lehoux	Private entry	Bugatti	Bugatti T51	2.3 L8
46	(France) Guy Moll	Private entry	Alfa Romeo	Alfa Romeo Monza	2.3 L8
48	(France) Jean-Pierre Wimille	Private entry	Alfa Romeo	Alfa Romeo Monza	2.3 L8
50	(France) René Dreyfus	Automobiles E. Bugatti	Bugatti	Bugatti T51	2.3 L8
52	(France) Raymond Sommer	Private entry	Alfa Romeo	Alfa Romeo Monza	2.3 L8
?	(Italy) Ernesto Maserati	Officine A. Maserati	Maserati	?	?
?	(France) Frédéric Toselli	?	Bugatti	Bugatti T37A	1.5 L4
?	(France) Louis Trintignant	?	Bugatti	?	?
?	(France) Guy Bouriat	?	Bugatti	?	?
?	(Germany) Rudolf Caracciola	Scuderia CC	Alfa Romeo	Alfa Romeo Monza	2.3 L8
?	(United Kingdom) Tim Birkin	Bernard Rubin	Alfa Romeo	Alfa Romeo Monza	2.3 L8

== Starting grid ==
First row
3		2		1
(Chile) Zanelli Alfa Romeo		(France) Félix Alfa Romeo		(United Kingdom) Howe Bugatti
Second row
	5		4	
	(Italy) Nuvolari Alfa Romeo		(Switzerland) Villars Alfa Romeo	
Third row
8		7		6
(United Kingdom) Eyston Alfa Romeo		(Italy) Taruffi Alfa Romeo		(Italy) Zehender Maserati
Fourth row
	10		9	
	(France) Bussienne Bugatti		(Poland) Czaykowski Bugatti	
Fifth row
13		12		11
(Italy) Campari Maserati		(Switzerland) Waldthausen Alfa Romeo		(France) Étancelin Alfa Romeo
Sixth row
	15		14	
	(Monaco) Chiron Alfa Romeo		(France) Gaupillat Bugatti	
Seventh row
18		17		16
(France) Wimille Alfa Romeo		(France) Moll Alfa Romeo		(France) Lehoux Bugatti
Eighth row
			19	
(France) Sommer Alfa Romeo

== Classification ==
=== Race ===
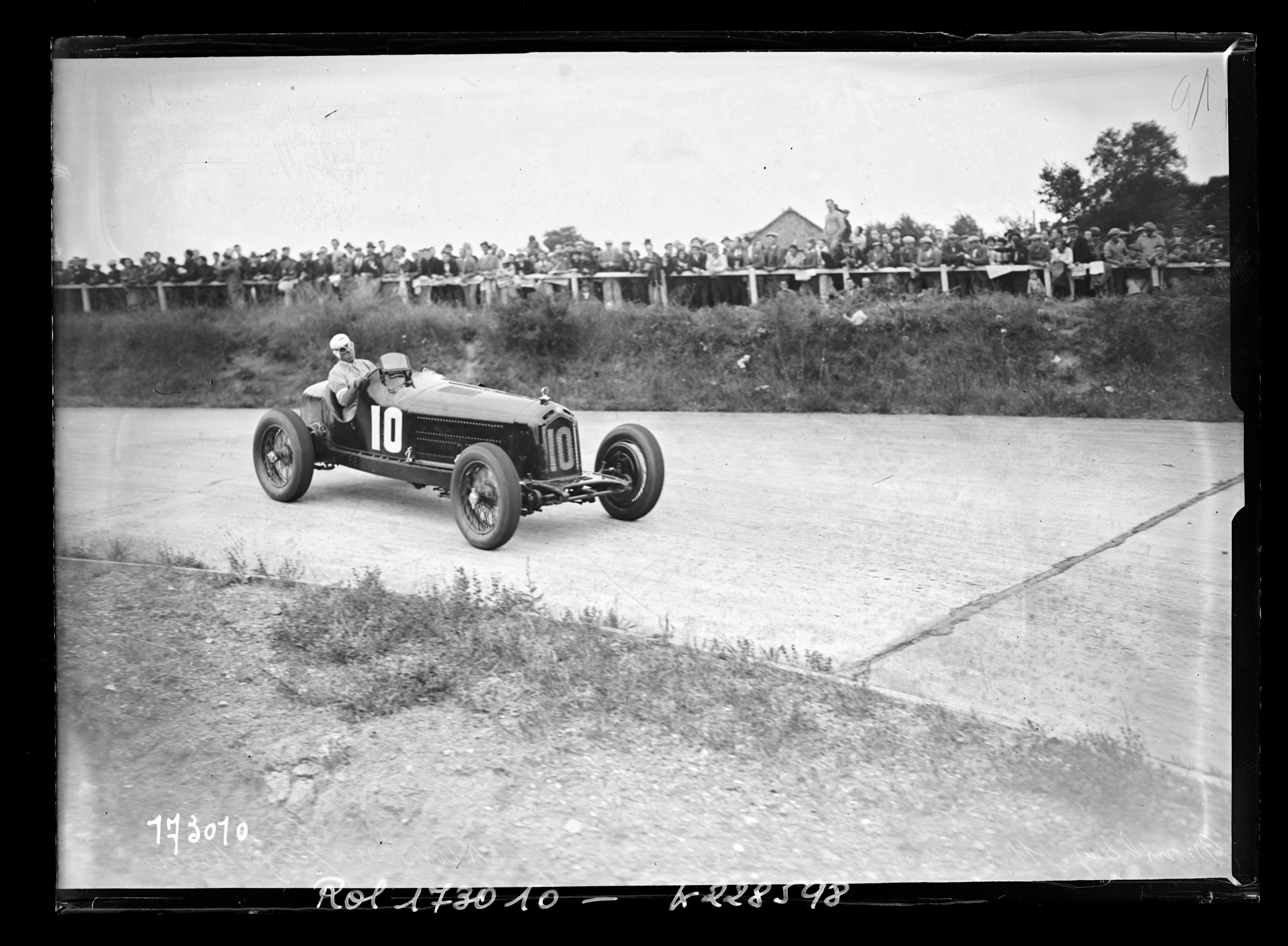
Tazio Nuvolari contesting the Grand Prix in an Alfa Romeo Monza. The car retired from the race.

Pos	No	Driver	Car	Laps	Time/Retired	Grid
1	32	(Italy) Giuseppe Campari	Maserati 8C-3000	40	3:48:45.4	13
2	26	(France) Philippe Étancelin	Alfa Romeo Monza	40	+52.0	11
3	18	(United Kingdom) George Eyston	Alfa Romeo Monza	39	+1 lap	8
4	52	(France) Raymond Sommer	Alfa Romeo Monza	39	+1 lap	19
5	46	(France) Guy Moll	Alfa Romeo Monza	38	+2 laps	17
6	8	(Switzerland) Julio Villars	Alfa Romeo Monza	34	+6 laps	4
Ret	38	(Italy) Piero Taruffi (Italy) Tazio Nuvolari	Alfa Romeo Monza	25	Transmission	7
Ret	12	(Italy) Goffredo Zehender	Maserati 8CM	19	Shock absorbers	6
Ret	2	(United Kingdom) Earl Howe	Bugatti T51	19	Injured eye by broken glass	1
Ret	6	(Chile) Juan Zanelli	Alfa Romeo Monza	19	Did not finish	3
Ret	4	(France) Pierre Félix	Alfa Romeo Monza	17	Engine	2
Ret	22	(Poland) Stanisłas Czaykowski	Bugatti T54	8	Gearbox bearing	9
Ret	42	(Monaco) Louis Chiron	Alfa Romeo Monza	6	Transmission	15
Ret	10	(Italy) Tazio Nuvolari	Alfa Romeo Monza	6	Transmission	5
Ret	24	(France) Pierre Bussienne	Bugatti T51	5	Gearbox	10
Ret	28	(Switzerland) Karl von Waldthausen	Alfa Romeo Monza	4	Engine	12
Ret	48	(France) Jean-Pierre Wimille	Alfa Romeo Monza	2	Gearbox	18
Ret	44	(France) Marcel Lehoux	Bugatti T51	1	Connecting rod	16
Ret	36	(France) Jean Gaupillat	Bugatti T51	0	Ignition	14
DNS	14	(Italy) Baconin Borzacchini	Alfa Romeo Monza		Did not follow team orders	
DNA	12	(Italy) Luigi Fagioli	Maserati 8CM		Car driven by Zehender	
DNA	16	(Italy) Achille Varzi	Bugatti T59		Withdrawn, car not ready	
DNA	20	(France) Albert Divo	Bugatti T51		Withdrawn, car not ready	
DNA	30	(United Kingdom) William Grover-Williams	Bugatti T51		Withdrawn, car not ready	
DNA	34	(Romania) Prince Nicolas	Bugatti ?		Did not show up	
DNA	40	(France) Benoît Falchetto	Bugatti ?		Did not show up	
DNA	50	(France) René Dreyfus	Bugatti T51		Withdrawn, car not ready	
DNA	?	(Italy) Ernesto Maserati	Maserati ?		Did not show up	
DNA	?	(France) Frédéric Toselli	Bugatti T37A		Died May 5 after a crash	
DNA	?	(France) Louis Trintignant	Bugatti ?		Died May 20 at Picardy GP	
DNA	?	(France) Guy Bouriat	Bugatti ?		Died May 21 at Picardy GP	
DNA	?	(Germany) Rudolf Caracciola	Alfa Romeo Monza		Injured in hospital	
DNA	?	(United Kingdom) Tim Birkin	Alfa Romeo Monza		Sick in London	

Notes:

- Campari's Maserati was push-started during a pit stop, which was technically a breach of Article 187 of the regulations. As such, Campari's win was protested after the race, but the Sporting Commissioners upheld the result, penalising him only with a 1000 F fine.

Grand Prix Race
Previous race: 1933 Monaco Grand Prix	1933 Grand Prix season Grandes Épreuves	Next race: 1933 Belgian Grand Prix
Previous race: 1932 French Grand Prix	French Grand Prix	Next race: 1934 French Grand Prix
