= 1936 Pau Grand Prix =

Race details
- Date: 1 March 1936
- Official name: Grand Prix de Pau
- Location: Pau, France
- Course length: 2.76 km (1.714 miles)
- Distance: 100 laps, 276 km (171.498 miles)

Pole position
Driver	(France) Jean-Pierre Wimille	Bugatti
- Time: 1:59.0

Fastest lap
Driver	(France) Jean-Pierre Wimille	Bugatti
- Time: 1:57.5

Podium
First	(France) Philippe Étancelin	Maserati
Second	(United Kingdom) Charlie Martin	Alfa Romeo
Third	(France) Marcel Lehoux	Bugatti

The 1936 Pau Grand Prix was a Grand Prix motor race held on 1 March 1936. This race was part of the 1936 Grand Prix season as a non-championship race. The race was won by French driver Philippe Étancelin in his Maserati V8. Three cars entered by Scuderia Ferrari were due to race but stopped at the French border by Benito Mussolini, saying that no Italian team should race in France until after the meeting of the League of Nations on the 10 March.

== Results ==
=== Qualifying ===
Pos	No	Driver	Constructor	Time	Gap
1	6	(France) Jean-Pierre Wimille	Bugatti	1:59.0	–
2	14	(France) Raymond Sommer	Alfa Romeo	2:00.0	+1.0
3	24	(United Kingdom) Charlie Martin	Alfa Romeo	2:03.0	+4.0
4	4	(France) Philippe Étancelin	Maserati	2:06.0	+7.0
5	12	(France) Marcel Lehoux	Bugatti	2:10.0	+11.0
6	20	(Spain) José María de Villapadierna	Alfa Romeo	2:11.0	+12.0
7	18	(France) Robert Brunet	Maserati	2:11.0	+12.0
8	10	(France) "Raph"	Alfa Romeo	2:16.0	+17.0
9	26	(France) Jean Delorme	Bugatti	–	–
10	22	(France) Hellé Nice	Alfa Romeo	–	–
DNA	2	(Italy) Tazio Nuvolari	Alfa Romeo	–	–
DNA	8	(Italy) Antonio Brivio	Alfa Romeo	–	–
DNA	16	(Italy) Giuseppe Farina	Alfa Romeo	–	–

=== Race ===
Pos	No	Driver	Constructor	Laps	Time/Retired
1	4	(France) Philippe Étancelin	Maserati	100	3:22:26.6
2	24	(United Kingdom) Charlie Martin	Alfa Romeo	100	+13.4
3	12	(France) Marcel Lehoux	Bugatti	100	+1:31.4
4	20	(Spain) José María de Villapadierna	Alfa Romeo	97	+3 Laps
Ret	14	(France) Raymond Sommer	Alfa Romeo	75	Rear Axle
Ret	26	(France) Jean Delorme	Bugatti	50	Valve
Ret	6	(France) Jean-Pierre Wimille	Bugatti	29	Brakes
Ret	18	(France) Robert Brunet	Maserati	7	Brakes
Ret	10	(France) "Raph"	Alfa Romeo	4	Engine
Ret	22	(France) Hellé Nice	Alfa Romeo	3	Accident

Preceded by 1935 Pau Grand Prix	Pau Grand Prix; 1936	Succeeded by 1937 Pau Grand Prix
