= 1935 Pau Grand Prix =

Race details
- Date: 24 February 1935
- Official name: Grand Prix de Pau
- Location: Pau, France
- Course: Temporary Street Circuit
- Course length: 2.760 km (1.720 miles)
- Distance: 80 laps, 221.500 km (137.600 miles)

Pole position
Driver	(Italy) Tazio Nuvolari	Alfa Romeo Tipo B
- Time: 1:53.0

Fastest lap
Driver	(Italy) Tazio Nuvolari	Alfa Romeo Tipo B
- Time: 1:51.7

Podium
First	(Italy) Tazio Nuvolari	Alfa Romeo Tipo B
Second	(France) René Dreyfus	Alfa Romeo Tipo B
Third	(Italy) Luigi Soffietti	Maserati 8CM

The 1935 Pau Grand Prix was a motor race held on 24 February 1935 at the Pau circuit, in Pau, Pyrénées-Atlantiques, France. The Grand Prix was won by Tazio Nuvolari, driving the Alfa Romeo Tipo B. René Dreyfus finished second and Luigi Soffietti third.

== Classification ==
=== Race ===
Pos	No	Driver	Vehicle	Laps	Time/Retired	Grid
1	14	(Italy) Tazio Nuvolari	Alfa Romeo Tipo B	80	2hr 38min 19.8sec	1
2	20	(France) René Dreyfus	Alfa Romeo Tipo B	80	+ 26.0 s	3
3	24	(Italy) Luigi Soffietti	Maserati 8CM	80	+ 3:50.0 s	5
4	26	(France) Benoit Falchetto	Maserati 8CM	80	+ 3:52.0 s	6
5	2	(France) Robert Brunet	Maserati 8CM	79	+ 1 lap	7
6	22	(France) Robert Cazaux	Bugatti T51	77	+ 3 laps	9
7	28	(Spain) Genaro Léoz-Abad	Bugatti T51	77	+ 3 laps	8
8	6	(France) Hellé Nice	Alfa Romeo Monza	75	+ 5 laps	10
9	10	(France) Jean Delorme	Bugatti T51	75	+ 5 laps	12
Ret	4	(France) Marcel Lehoux	Bugatti T51	32	Transmission	4
Ret	16	(France) Philippe Étancelin	Maserati 8CM	17	Oil pump	2
Ret	18	(France) Pierre Veyron	Bugatti T51	13	Overheating	13
Ret	42	(Chile) Juan Zanelli	Nacional Pescara	12	Brakes	11

Preceded by 1933 Pau Grand Prix	Pau Grand Prix; 1935	Succeeded by 1936 Pau Grand Prix
