= Luigi Castelbarco =

Italian nobleman and racing driver (1909–1994)

- Born: Luigi Visconti Simonetta Pindemonte Rezzonico, Conte di Castelbarco; 5 April 1909 Milan, Italy
- Died: 2 February 1994 (aged 84) Milan

Don Luigi Visconti Simonetta Pindemonte Rezzonico, Conte di Castelbarco, known as Luigi Castelbarco (5 April 1909 – 2 February 1994), was an Italan nobleman and amateur racing driver, whose racing activities took place before the Second World War.

== Racing career ==
With his Maserati 26M at the 1932 Rome Grand Prix

Castelbarco started racing on motorycles in the 1920s, and won the 175cc class in a race at Alessandria in 1927. He moved to four wheels in 1928, originally in an Amilcar, and in 1929 bought a Bugatti Type 43 in which he took part in the 1929 Mille Miglia; in 1930 he also tried out powerboat racing at Abbazia. During the 1930s he had an informal partnership with Johnny Lurani, under which they shared race transportation and entry logistics. After Lurani was called up to the Italian army, Castelbarco continued on his own; Lurani consequently formed the Scuderia Ambrosiana on his demob.

His earliest significant success came in the Tunis 6 Hours in 1931, a race for (heavily) modified touring cars held before the Tunis Grand Prix, in which he took first place, sharing a Maserati with René Dreyfus. His first appearance at a national Grand Prix came later in the year at his home race, but he was a non-starter.

Castelbarco shared a brand-new Bugatti Type 55 with Achille Varzi at the 1932 Mille Miglia - the only time a 55 took part in the event - but the duo retired after a stone punctured the fuel tank.

Castelbarco's one Grand Prix start came at the 1932 Italian Grand Prix in his own Maserati 26M, but his race was compromised by an early pit-stop, before he crashed on the 20th lap. He thereafter concentrated on voiturette races and won the voiturette class of the 1934 Eifelrennen, run separately from the main event, in a Maserati 4CM. His last race of note was the 1939 Tripoli Grand Prix, expected to be a sinecure for Italian voiturettes, but Mercedes-Benz entered Hermann Lang and Rudolf Caracciola in new brand-new W165 models, and they finished 1–2; Castelbarco was 10th in a Maserati 6CM entered by Lurani's Scuderia Ambrosiana.

== Motor industry ==
After the Second World War, Castelbarco teamed up with motorcycle engineer Giuseppe Benelli and the Beretta factory to produce a microcar, dubbed the BBC after the trio's initials; three prototypes were made, but the car never entered full promotion. In 1959 Castelbarco was one of the founders of C.M.A.E. (the Milanese historic motor club), and he later returned to the track in historic racing, driving his old Amilcar.

== Personal life ==
Castelbarco was the first son of Emanuele Giuseppe Castelbarco and Lina Erba; his brother Carlo Castelbarco also became a racing driver. In 1932, he married Luciana Peperle degli Azzoni, and the couple had three children: Aldrigo, born in 1932, Briano in 1936, and Federico in 1948.

== Race results ==
=== European Championship ===
(key)

Year	Entrant	Chassis	Engine	1	2	3	EDC	Pts
1932	L. Castelbarco	Maserati 26M	Maserati	ITA; Ret	FRA	GER	12th	20

- Single-seaters
- Sportscars
- European Mountainclimb Championship
