= Guy Moll =

French racing driver

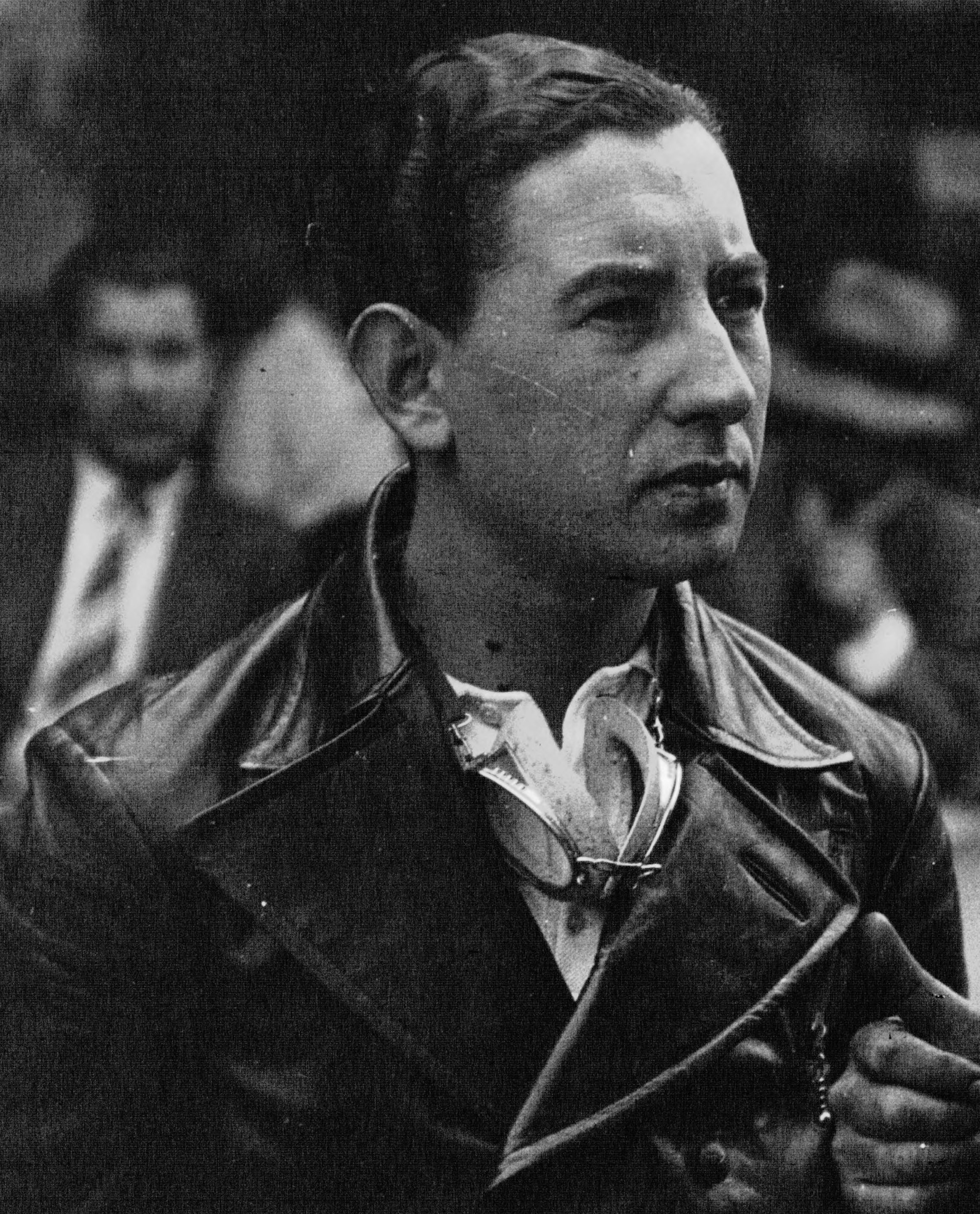
Guy Moll at the 1934 Grand Prix automobile de Montreux

Guillaume Laurent "Guy" Moll (28 May 1910 – 15 August 1934) was a French racing driver.

Moll was the son of a French father and Spanish mother who had emigrated to Algeria, then a French colony. He had only started racing in 1930, running a Lorraine-Dietrich in sporadic local events in Algeria. In 1932 he was noticed by Marcel Lehoux, the owner of a large trade company in Algeria and a successful Grand Prix driver in his own right; Lehoux was convinced of Moll's talents and offered Moll his Bugatti for the Oran and Casablanca Grands Prix. Moll took the lead from the start in Oran, only to fall back to second and then retire, then retired again in Casablanca. Lehoux, undeterred, brought Moll to France for his first taste of continental racing for the Marseilles Grand Prix at Miramas; Moll finished a sensational third, trailing the Alfa Romeos of Raymond Sommer and Tazio Nuvolari.

In 1933, Moll continued in a Bugatti, placing second to Lehoux at Pau in a snowstorm on a track he had never driven. Moll then used family money to obtain an Alfa Romeo 8C2300. Despite it being less potent than the Alfa P3s run by the likes of Scuderia Ferrari, Moll came third at Nimes (behind Étancelin and Nuvolari), Miramas, Comminges, and Nice, and scored a near-win in the Marne Grand Prix at Reims. Moll was signed to drive P3s by Enzo Ferrari for 1934. Despite facing more powerful Auto Unions and Benzes, Moll scored his first Grand Prix win at the 1934 Monaco Grand Prix when he inherited the lead after fellow Scuderia Ferrari driver Louis Chiron, babying his ill P3 home, made a mistake and spun into sandbags at the Station Hairpin with less than two laps to go. A month later, he finished a close second to teammate Achille Varzi at Tripoli amidst an accusations Varzi had tried to force him off the road. Moll also won the Avusrennen with his Alfa Romeo in streamlined configuration (powered by a 265 hp (198 kW) 3.2 liter) when a dominant performance from rookie team Auto Union ended with Hans Stuck's clutch failure. Moll finished third in the French Grand Prix at Montlhéry, following Chiron home, while coming second at the Targa Florio and Coppa Ciano, trailing teammate Varzi both times.

On a wet and windy Pescara Circuit for the Coppa Acerbo in August, running second and chasing Luigi Fagioli for the lead, Moll lost control at near top speed on a narrow straightaway while passing Ernst Henne's Mercedes. Moll's P3 went into a ditch and crashed into a bridge, and he succumbed to his injuries shortly thereafter. The cause of the wreck remains unknown.

Even though he had such a short career, Enzo Ferrari ranked Moll one of the best drivers he had ever seen, and believed he could have become one of the best ever.

Moll was buried in the Maison Carrée Alger cemetery in his native Algeria.

== Sources ==
- Kettlewell, Mike. "Monaco: Road Racing on the Riviera", in Northey, Tom, editor. World of Automobiles, Volume 12, pp. 1381–4. London: Orbis, 1974.
- Twite, Mike. "Moll: The Grand Prix race ace from Algeria", in Northey, Tom, editor. World of Automobiles, Volume 12, p. 1380. London: Orbis, 1974.
