= Jean Gaupillat =

French racing driver (1891–1934)

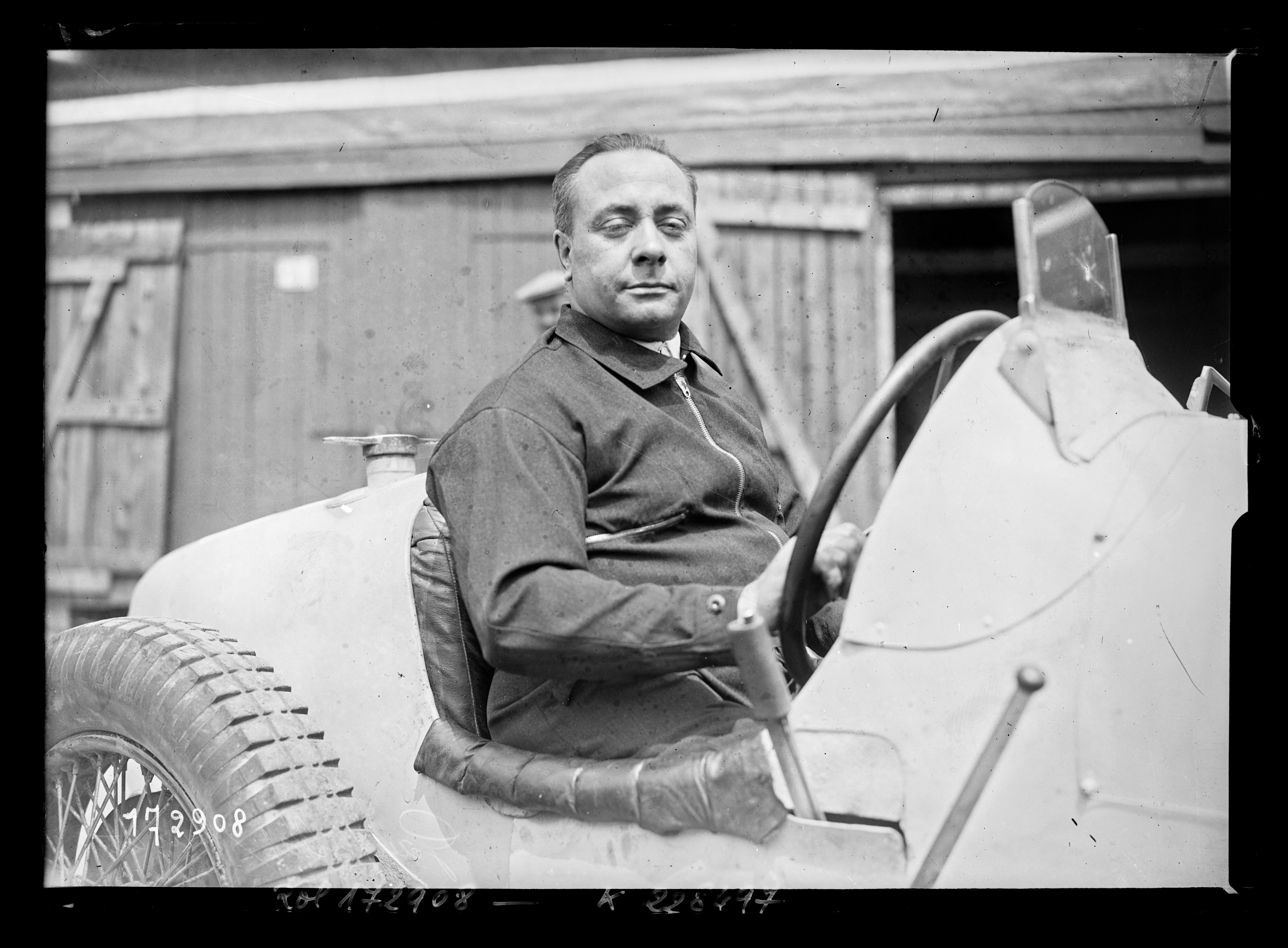
- With his Bugatti T51 at Montlhéry for the 1933 French Grand Prix, at which he retired on the first lap
- Born: 6 January 1891 Paris
- Died: 23 July 1934 (aged 43) Dieppe

Jean Gaupillat (6 January 1891 – 23 July 1934) was a French racing driver.

== Career ==
Gaupillat was from a family of wealthy industrialists, who co-owned the ociété Française des Munitions de Chasse, de Tir et de Guerre.

During the First World War he received the Croix de Guerre for his service as an artillery officer, and was later appointed as a Chevalier of the Légion d'Honneur. He started racing in 1928, in a B.N.C. cyclecar, but soon switched to Bugattis, which he raced for the rest of his career.

Gaupillat's first and greatest racing success was winning the voiturette class of the 1929 Dieppe Grand Prix in a Bugatti Type 35B. He made his Grand Prix debut at the 1930 French Grand Prix at Pau, driving in the voiturette class with a 37A, but retired. For the 1931 AIACR European Championship season, he teamed with Jean-Pierre Wimille to finish 4th at the Italian Grand Prix; this was his best Grande Epreuve result, although the mercurial Wimille was given most of the credit.

Gaupillat had a run of retirements over the next three years, although he finished 24th (and 4th in class) at the 1933 24 Hours of Le Mans, with Stanislas Czaykowski in the latter's Bugatti Type 51A; it was Gaupillat's only appearance in the event.

He recorded an 8th place finish at the 1934 Eifelrennen in his Bugatti T51, but, at the Dieppe Grand Prix in July, while running 4th, he lost control at the Val Gosset curve, and crashed into a tree; he succumbed to the injuries the following day.

== European Championship results ==
(key)

Year	Entrant	Chassis	Engine	1	2	3	EDC	Pts
1931	J.-P. Wimille	Bugatti T51	Bugatti 2.3 L8	ITA; 4	FRA; Ret	BEL; Ret	6th	14
1932	J. Gaupillat	Bugatti T51	Bugatti 2.3 L8	ITA	FRA; Ret	GER	12th	20
