= Algerian Grand Prix =

- Staouéli street circuit (1928-'30, 1937); Bir El Djir street circuit (1930, 1932); Bouzaréah street circuit (1934)

Race information
- Number of times held: 7
- First held: 1928
- Last held: 1937
- Most wins (drivers): (France) Jean-Pierre Wimille (3)
- Most wins (constructors): (France) Bugatti (7)
- Circuit length: 1.90 km (1.18 miles)

Last race (1937)

Pole position

Podium
- 1. (France) Jean-Pierre Wimille; Bugatti; 2. (France) Joseph Paul; Delahaye; 3. (France) René Carrièrè; Delahaye

Fastest lap

The Algerian Grand Prix or Grand Prix d'Alger was a motor race held in the 1920s and 1930s at several coastal road courses in the department of French Algeria.

== Algerian Grand Prix ==
The success of the Italian organised Tripoli Grand Prix and the increasing popularity of the Moroccan Grand Prix in the French protectorate in Morocco (both began in 1925) saw motor racing bloom across French North Africa. Alongside the neighbouring Tunis Grand Prix, the Algerian Grand Prix was first held in the spring of 1928. A road course was chosen in Staouéli, west of the capital Algiers. The race was held on May 6 made up of a small grid made up mostly of Grand Prix Bugattis and Amilcar cyclecars. Local racing driver Marcel Lehoux won the 350 km race, lapping the field as the only Grand Prix car to finish in good order with Guy Cloître finishing second in the first of the Amilcars. 1929 brought a remarkably similar result with Lehoux leading Cloître home by 25 minutes. A third consecutive victory though would be denied by fellow Bugatti racer Philippe Étancelin.

The next Algerian Grand Prix was not held until 1934. A new circuit, used just the once, was laid out on the roads of Bouzaréah, in northern Algiers. An end of season event held in the fringes of the European winter, two heat races were combined to give a final result. Against strong opposition from Alfa Romeo and Maserati, Jean-Pierre Wimille won both races with second going in a shared drive to Scuderia Ferrari drivers Antonio Brivio and Louis Chiron in an Alfa Romeo Tipo B.

The heat was going out of racing in north Africa as the 1930s wound on and the European season became more centralised against the increasing international tensions. The next race was in 1937 and racing returned to Staouéli, although on a much shorter course for a sports car race. Again in a two heat format, Wimille took his third consecutive victory in Algeria. He took his Bugatti T59 to victory in the first heat and was second behind René Carriere's Delahaye 135CS in the second heat.

== Oran Grand Prix ==
Coastal Algeria was divided into three départements, Oran, Alger and Constantine. A rival race to the one in Alger, called the Oran Grand Prix or Grand Prix d'Oranie, sprang up in 1930, just a couple of weeks prior to the 1930 Algerian Grand Prix. The Arcole circuit was mapped out in Bir El Djir. The first race saw Alger's usual mix of Bugattis and Amilcars. The favoured Bugatti drivers Lehoux, Etancelin and René Dreyfus all dropped out leaving Jean de Maleplane to score the biggest win of his career.

After a years break, a much improved field arrived in 1932 with Alfa Romeos and Maseratis arriving for the first time, pushing the 1.5 litre voiturettes and the 1.1 litre cyclecars further down the grid. The wins stayed with Bugatti as Jean-Pierre Wimille began his domination of Algerian racing. Wimille won by two laps ahead of the Alfa Romeo of Goffredo Zehender. That was where racing ended in Oran, the focus turned back towards events closer to the capital Algiers.

== Post-war ==
After World War II sports car racing would make sporadic returns to Algeria. Pierre Boncompagni would win a three-hour race in 1953 in Staouéli a Ferrari 340 MM. 1955 saw Louis Rosier take a Ferrari 750 Monza to win a Bougie Grand Prix held in Bougie to the east of Algiers. Fernand Tavano won in 1959 in a Ferrari 500 TRC again in Staouéli.

== Winners ==
Results sourced from:

Year	Driver	Constructor	Location	Report
1937	(France) Jean-Pierre Wimille	Bugatti T59/57	Staouéli street circuit	Report
1935 -36	Not held			
1934	(France) Jean-Pierre Wimille	Bugatti T59	Bouzaréah street circuit	Report
1933	Not held			
1932	(France) Jean-Pierre Wimille	Bugatti T51	Bir El Djir street circuit, Oran GP	Report
1931	Not held			
1930	(France) Philippe Etancelin	Bugatti T35	Staouéli street circuit	Report
1930	(France) Jean de Maleplane	Bugatti T35C	Bir El Djir street circuit, Oran GP	Report
1929	(France) Marcel Lehoux	Bugatti T35C	Staouéli street circuit	Report
1928	(France) Marcel Lehoux	Bugatti T35C	Staouéli street circuit	Report
