= Julio Villars =

Swiss racing driver (1897–1981)

- At the 1933 French Grand Prix
- Born: 1897
- Died: 1981 (aged 83–84)

Julio Villars (1897–1981) was a Swiss amateur racing driver, whose career lasted only 2 years, but included one Grand Prix.

== Career ==
In 1932, Villars formed the Écurie Versoix, with financing from his friend and fellow enthusiast Karl von Waldthausen, originally focussing on hillclimbing; Villars tended to use a 6C model of 1.75l displacement, while his team-mate used a 2.3 litre 8C. The two finished 5th and 6th in the sportscar class of the 1932 Swiss Hillclimbing Championship, von Waldthausen being ahead.

By 1933, Villars had also acquired an 8C, and the team undertook a season of circuit-racing, including the 1933 Eifelrennen - in which Villars retired - and the 1933 French Grand Prix at Monthléry. Villars finished 6th (and last) in the 40 lap Grand Prix, six laps behind winner Giuseppe Campari, while von Waldthausen retired.

Von Waldthausen was killed during the 1933 Marseilles Grand Prix, when a tyre on his 8C burst and the car rolled down the back straight. Villars wound up the team and sold its cars, one of which ended up in the hands of Ulrich Maag.

== Results ==
- Single-seater results
