= Carlo Castelbarco =

Italian nobleman and racing driver (1909–1994)

- Born: Conte Carlo Castelbarco Visconti Simonetta Pindemonte Rezzonico; 25 March 1911 Milan, Italy
- Died: 14 May 1988 (aged 77)

Carlo Castelbarco (25 March 1911 – 14 May 1988) was an Italian nobleman and racing driver, who took part in one Grand Prix.

== Career ==
Cortese/Castelbarco at the 1933 Mille Miglia

Castelbarco's pre-war career mostly lasted one season. Castelbarco's older brother Luigi had raced as an amateur for some years beforehand; in 1933, Carlo bought new from the factory an 8C-2300 Alfa Romeo Monza, and sat as riding mechanic with Franco Cortese on the 1933 Mille Miglia as he finished 2nd. The result was even more remarkable as a garage fire the night before the race required Castelbarco's mechanics to work through the night to fettle the car.

Castelbarco used the Alfa to win the Colli Torinesi hillclimb with it, before making his Grand Prix debut with it at the 1933 Italian Grand Prix. The meeting had two Grandes Epreuves; the national Grand Prix, held in the morning, in which Castelbarco came 6th. The afternoon saw the Monza Grand Prix on the banked oval only and held over two heats. Castelbarco was in the same heat as Giuseppe Campari and Baconin Borzacchini, and was close behind them when they crashed over the top of the curve; Castelbarco lost control trying to avoid the accident and also went over the banking, but avoided seriously injury.

Castelbarco only had a handful of races after then, including the 1938 Mille Miglia, and also took part in the Mille Miglia after the Second World War, finally stepping back for good after the 1955 event (in which he came 13th in a Fiat 8V bodied by Zagato), being invited by Aymo Maggi to present the prizes after the 1954 Mille Miglia.
