= 1932 Italian Grand Prix =

- Race 1 of 3 in the 1932 European Championship

Race details
- Date: 5 June 1932
- Official name: X Gran Premio d'Italia
- Location: Autodromo Nazionale di Monza; Monza, Italy
- Course: Permanent racing facility
- Course length: 10.00 km (6.21 miles)
- Distance: 83 laps, 837.592 km (520.456 miles)

Pole position
Driver	(Italy) Baconin Borzacchini	Alfa Romeo
- Grid positions set by ballot

Fastest lap
Driver	(Italy) Luigi Fagioli	Maserati
- Time: 3:19.4

Podium
First	(Italy) Tazio Nuvolari	Alfa Romeo
Second	(Italy) Luigi Fagioli	Maserati
Third	(Italy) Baconin Borzacchini; (Italy) Attilio Marinoni; (Germany) Rudolf Caracciola	Alfa Romeo

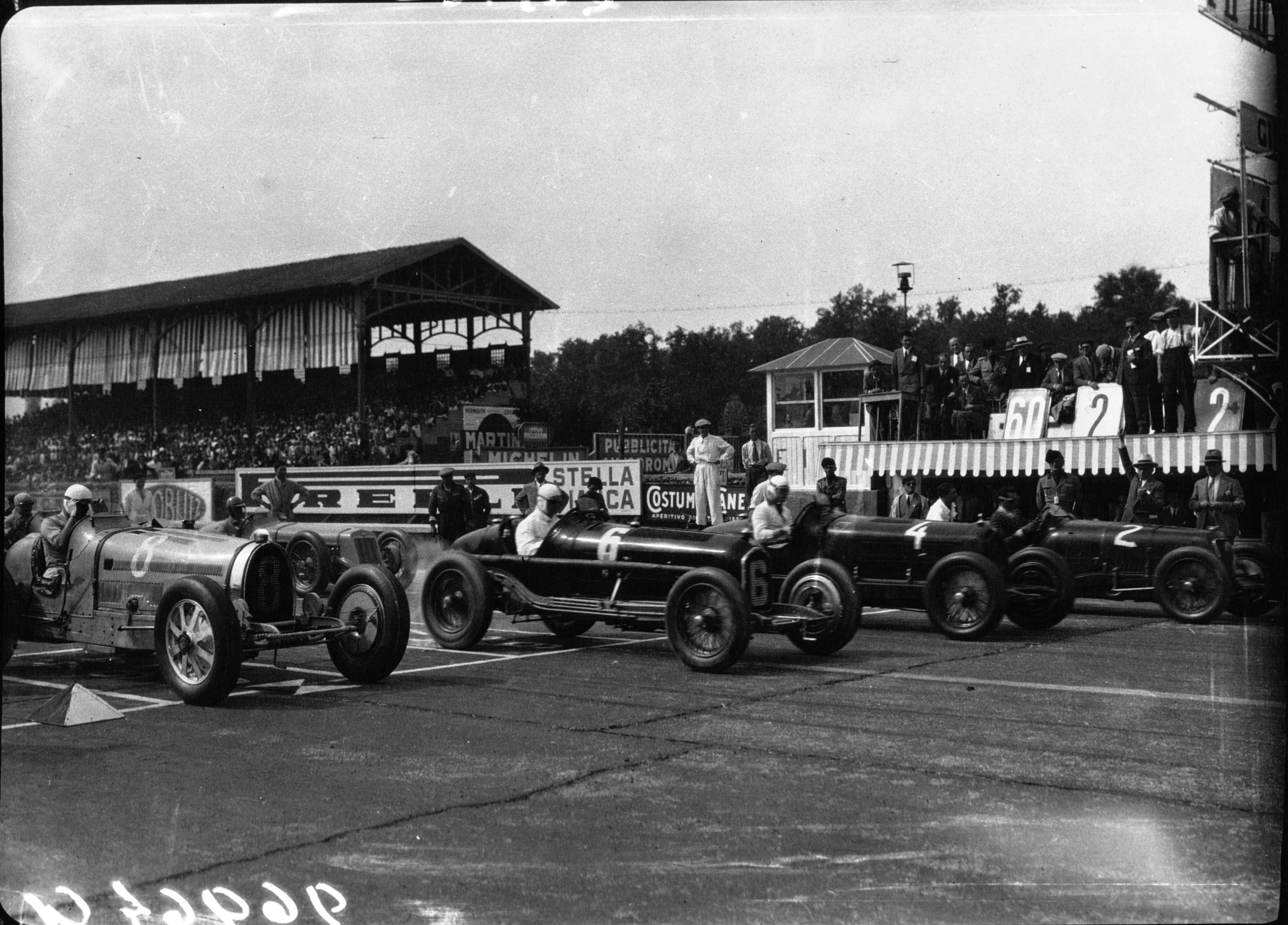
Grid of the 1932 Monza Grand Prix

The 1932 Italian Grand Prix was a Grand Prix motor race held at Monza on 5 June 1932.

== Classification ==
=== Race ===
Pos	No	Driver	Team	Car	Laps	Time/Retired	Grid	Points
1	8	(Italy) Tazio Nuvolari	Alfa Corse	Alfa Romeo Tipo B	83		4	1
2	12	(Italy) Luigi Fagioli	Maserati	Maserati V5	82	+1 Lap	6	2
3	2	(Italy) Baconin Borzacchini	Alfa Corse	Alfa Romeo Monza	82	+1 Lap	1	3
3	2	(Italy) Attilio Marinoni	Alfa Corse	Alfa Romeo Monza	82	+1 Lap	1	n/a
3	2	(Germany) Rudolf Caracciola	Alfa Corse	Alfa Romeo Monza	82	+1 Lap	1	n/a
4	14	(Italy) Giuseppe Campari	Alfa Corse	Alfa Romeo Tipo B P3	82	+1 Lap	7	4
5	22	(France) René Dreyfus	Bugatti	Bugatti T51	82	+1 Lap	11	4
6	26	(France) Albert Divo	Bugatti	Bugatti T51	81	+2 Laps	13	4
6	26	(France) Guy Bouriat	Bugatti	Bugatti T51	81	+2 Laps	13	n/a
7	24	(Italy) Pietro Ghersi	Scuderia Ferrari	Alfa Romeo Monza	79	+3 Laps	12	4
7	24	(Italy) Antonio Brivio	Scuderia Ferrari	Alfa Romeo Monza	79	+3 Laps	12	n/a
8	40	(Italy) Amedeo Ruggeri	Maserati	Maserati 26M	75	+8 Laps	16	4
9	28	(Italy) Eugenio Siena	Private entry	Alfa Romeo Monza	65	+18 Laps	14	4
9	28	(Italy) Antonio Brivio	Private entry	Alfa Romeo Monza	65	+18 Laps	14	n/a
10	18	(Italy) Luigi Premoli	Private entry	Maserati 26M	58	+25 Laps	9	5
11	20	(Germany) Rudolf Caracciola	Alfa Corse	Alfa Romeo Monza	57	Magneto	10	5
Ret	10	(Monaco) Louis Chiron	Bugatti	Bugatti T54	39	Overheating	5	6
Ret	10	(Italy) Achille Varzi	Bugatti	Bugatti T54	39	Overheating	5	n/a
Ret	16	(Italy) Achille Varzi	Bugatti	Bugatti T54	26	Transmission	8	6
Ret	4	(France) Marcel Lehoux	Bugatti	Bugatti T51	20	Con-rod	2	7
Ret	6	(Italy) Luigi Castelbarco	Private entry	Maserati 26M	19	Accident	3	7
DNS	30	(Italy) Carlo Gazzabini	Private entry	Alfa Romeo Monza			15	8

=== Starting grid positions ===
1st Row	3 Pos.	2 Pos.	1 Pos.
	(Italy); Castelbarco; Maserati	(France); Lehoux; Bugatti	(Italy); Borzacchini; Alfa Romeo
2nd Row	3 Pos.	2 Pos.	1 Pos.
	(Italy); Fagioli; Maserati	(Monaco); Chiron; Bugatti	(Italy); Nuvolari; Alfa Romeo
3rd Row	3 Pos.	2 Pos.	1 Pos.
	(Italy); Premoli; Maserati	(Italy); Varzi; Bugatti	(Italy); Campari; Alfa Romeo
4th Row	3 Pos.	2 Pos.	1 Pos.
	(Italy); Ghersi; Alfa Romeo	(France); Dreyfus; Bugatti	(Germany); Caracciola; Alfa Romeo
5th Row	3 Pos.	2 Pos.	1 Pos.
	(Italy); Gazzabini; Alfa Romeo	(Italy); Siena; Alfa Romeo	(France); Divo; Bugatti
6th Row	3 Pos.	2 Pos.	1 Pos.
			(Italy); Ruggeri; Maserati

Grand Prix Race
Previous race: 1931 German Grand Prix	1932 Grand Prix season Grandes Épreuves	Next race: 1932 French Grand Prix
Previous race: 1931 Italian Grand Prix	Italian Grand Prix	Next race: 1933 Italian Grand Prix
