= Carthage Street Circuit =

Street circuit in Tunis

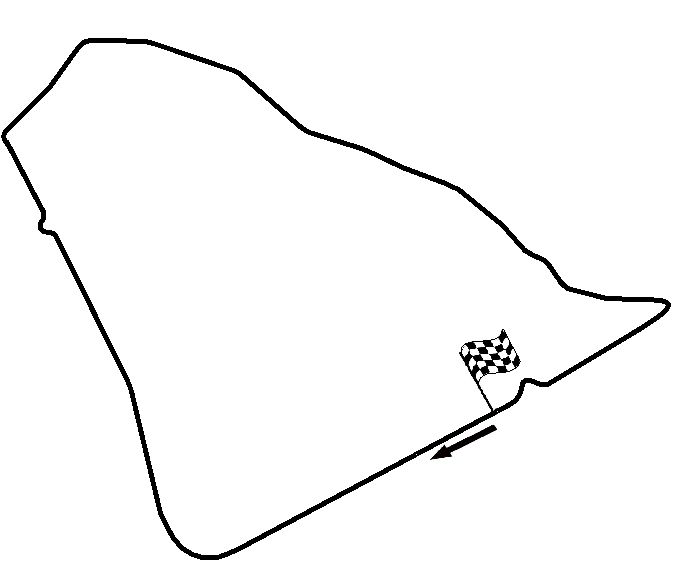
Layout of Carthage street circuit used in Tunis Grand Prix (1931-1937)

The Carthage Street Circuit was a street circuit in Tunis used in the Tunis Grand Prix between 1931 and 1937.

== History ==
The Tunis Grand Prix was originally held on a street circuit at Le Bardo, west of Tunis. After two Grands Prix, a much larger triangular highway circuit was used. It was laid out between the then separate cities of Tunis and Carthage, including the one in 1933. After 1937, the Tunis Grand Prix was not held until 1955, in Parc du Belvedere as Circuito du Belvedere, which was also used during historic revival events between 2000 and 2008.

== Course layout ==
The main straight (2.25 kilometres or 1.40 miles) is now located on the N9 from Ain Zaghouan to the border with Les Berges du Lac. From there the course follows a second straight (2.32 kilometres or 1.44 miles) through El Aouina, just east of La Charguia airport. The most northern point of the course is located in La Soukra, from where it follows the N10 south down to Sidi Daoud, where a hairpin and a chicane leads back to the main straight. The total length of the circuit is 12.9 kilometres (8.0 mi).

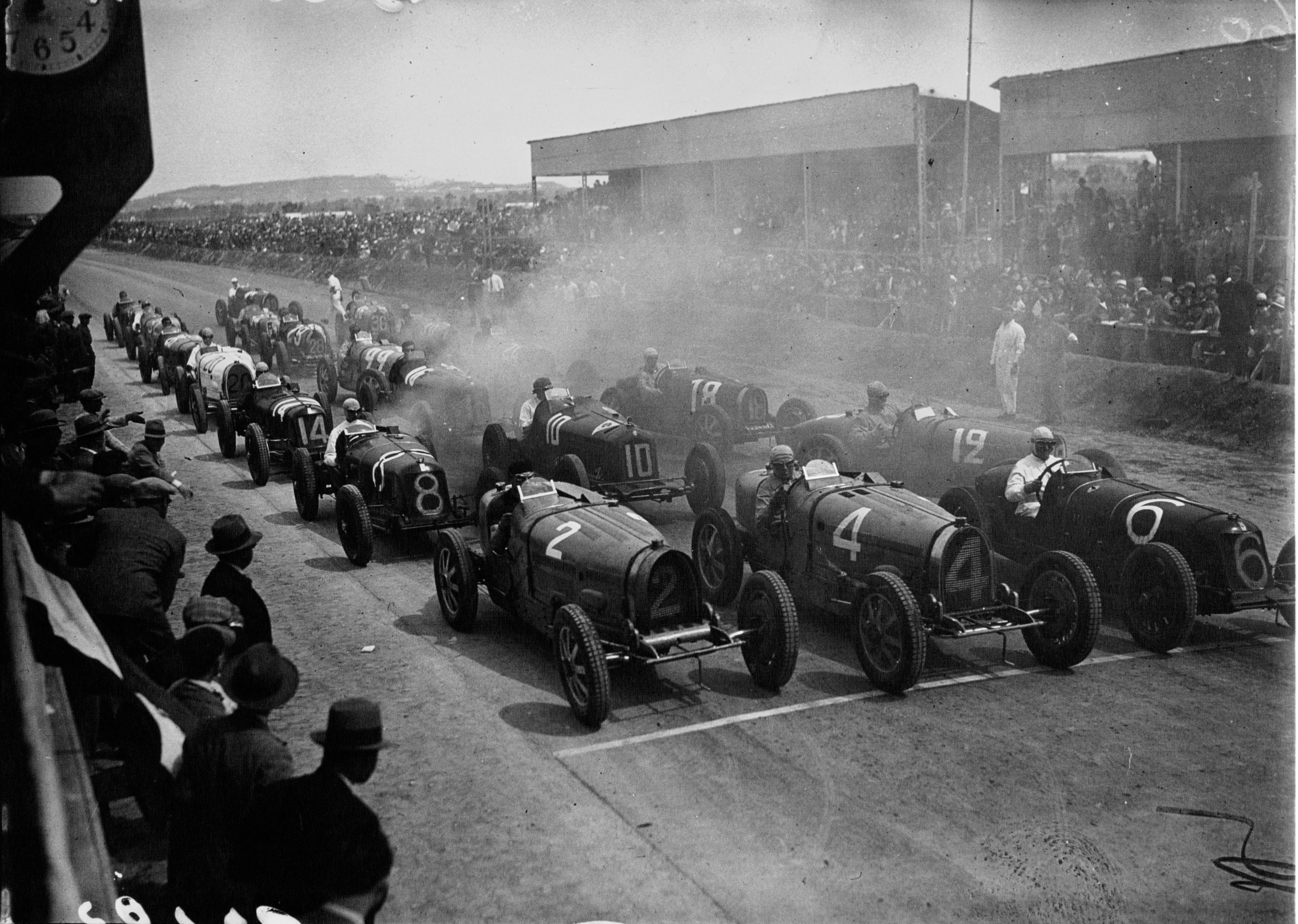
Start of the 1932 Tunis Grand Prix

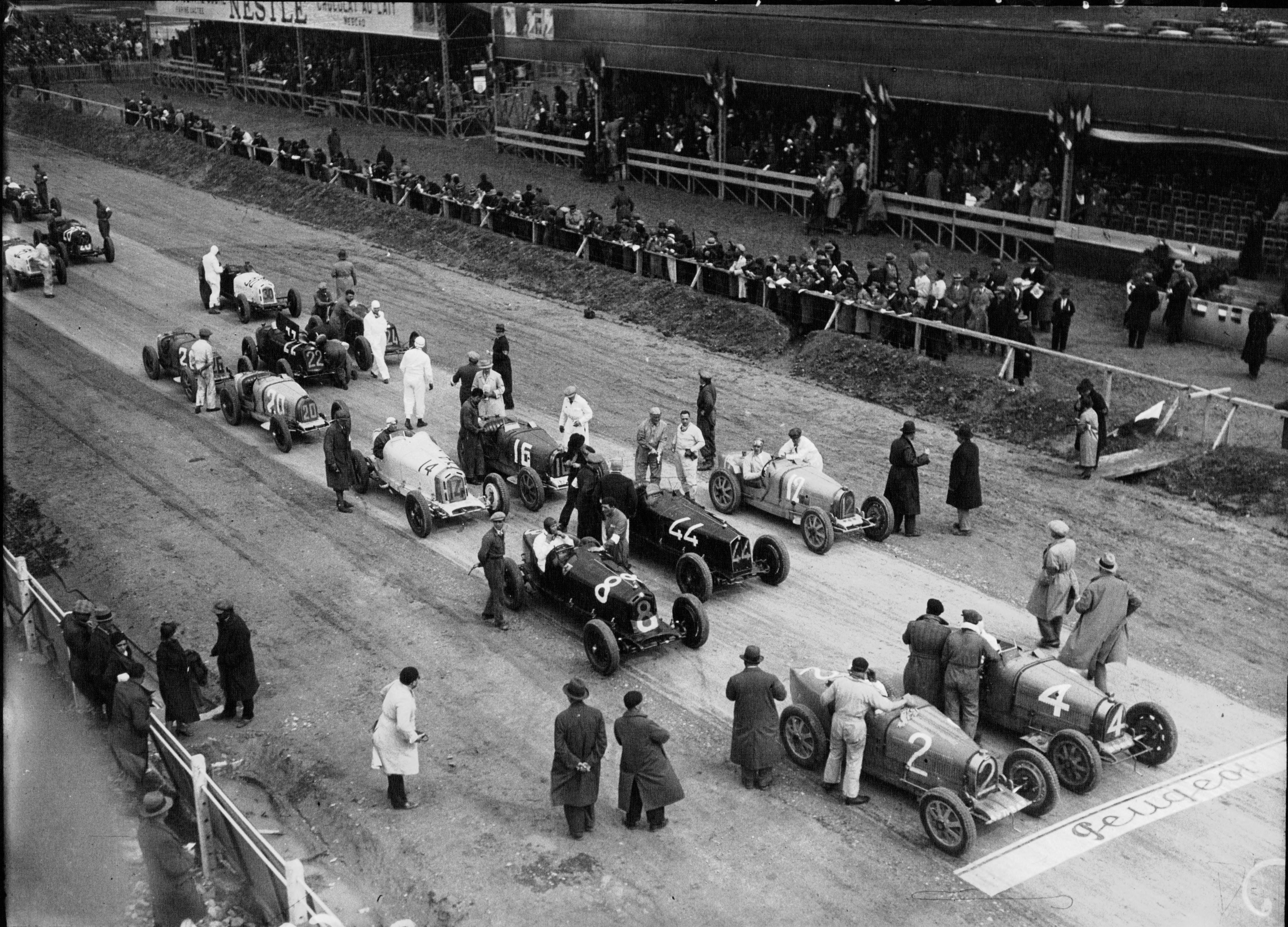
Grid of the 1933 Tunis Grand Prix

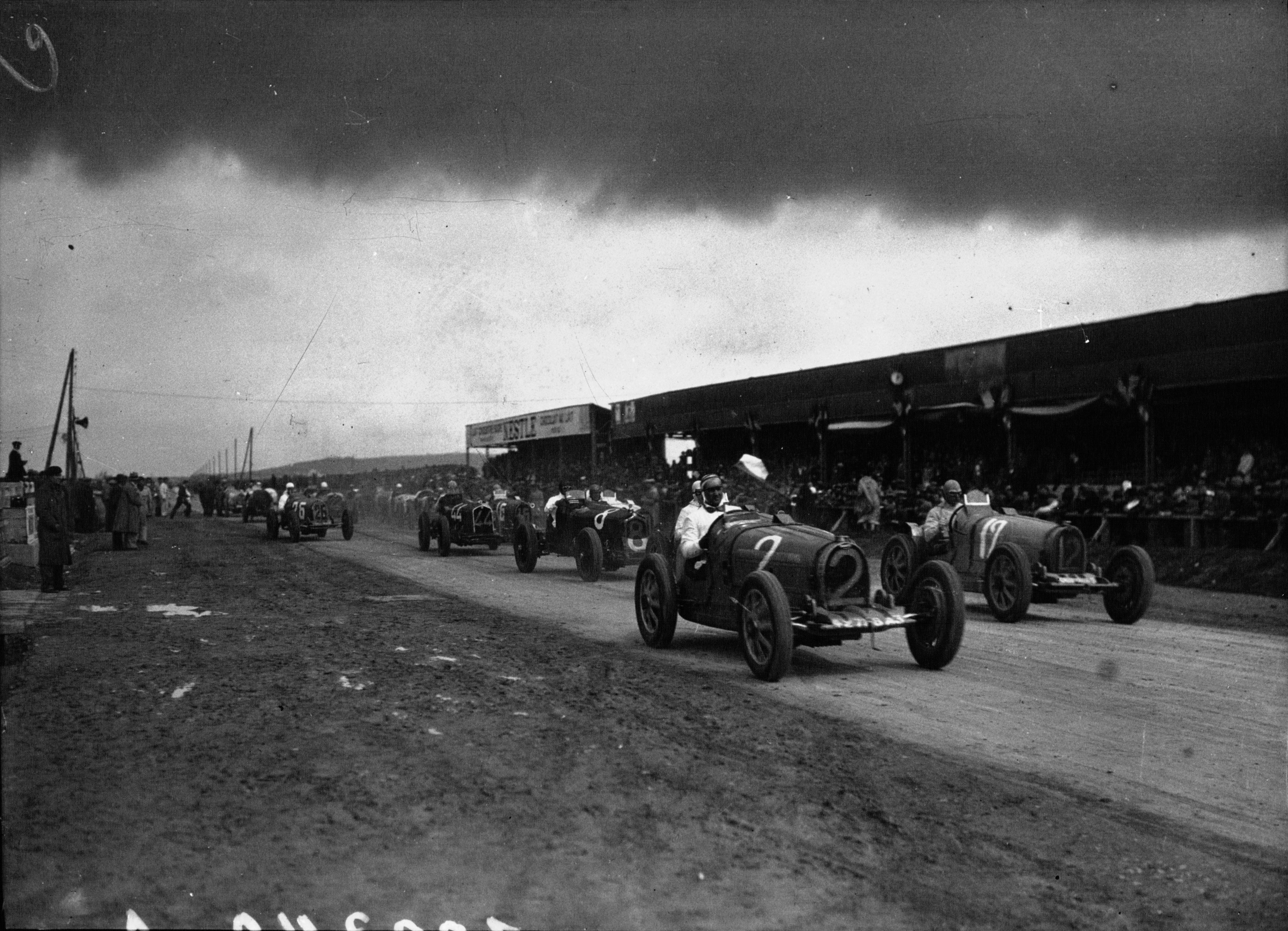
Start of the 1933 Tunis Grand Prix
