= 1932 French Grand Prix =

Coordinates: 49°15′14.67″N 3°55′50.02″E

- Race 2 of 3 in the 1932 European Championship
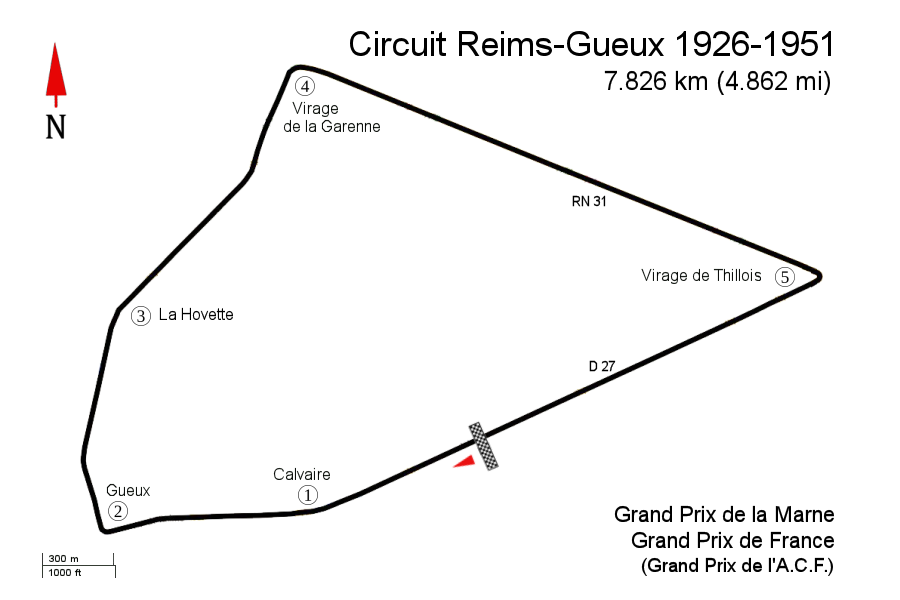

Race details
- Date: 3 July 1932
- Official name: XVIII Grand Prix de l'A.C.F.
- Location: Reims-Gueux; Reims, France
- Course: Public roads
- Course length: 7.826 km (4.863 miles)
- Distance: 92 laps, 719.992 km (447.382 miles)

Pole position
Driver	(France) Jean Gaupillat	Bugatti
- Grid positions set by ballot

Fastest lap
Driver	(Italy) Tazio Nuvolari	Alfa Romeo
- Time: 3:00.0

Podium
First	(Italy) Tazio Nuvolari	Alfa Romeo
Second	(Italy) Baconin Borzacchini	Alfa Romeo
Third	(Germany) Rudolf Caracciola	Alfa Romeo

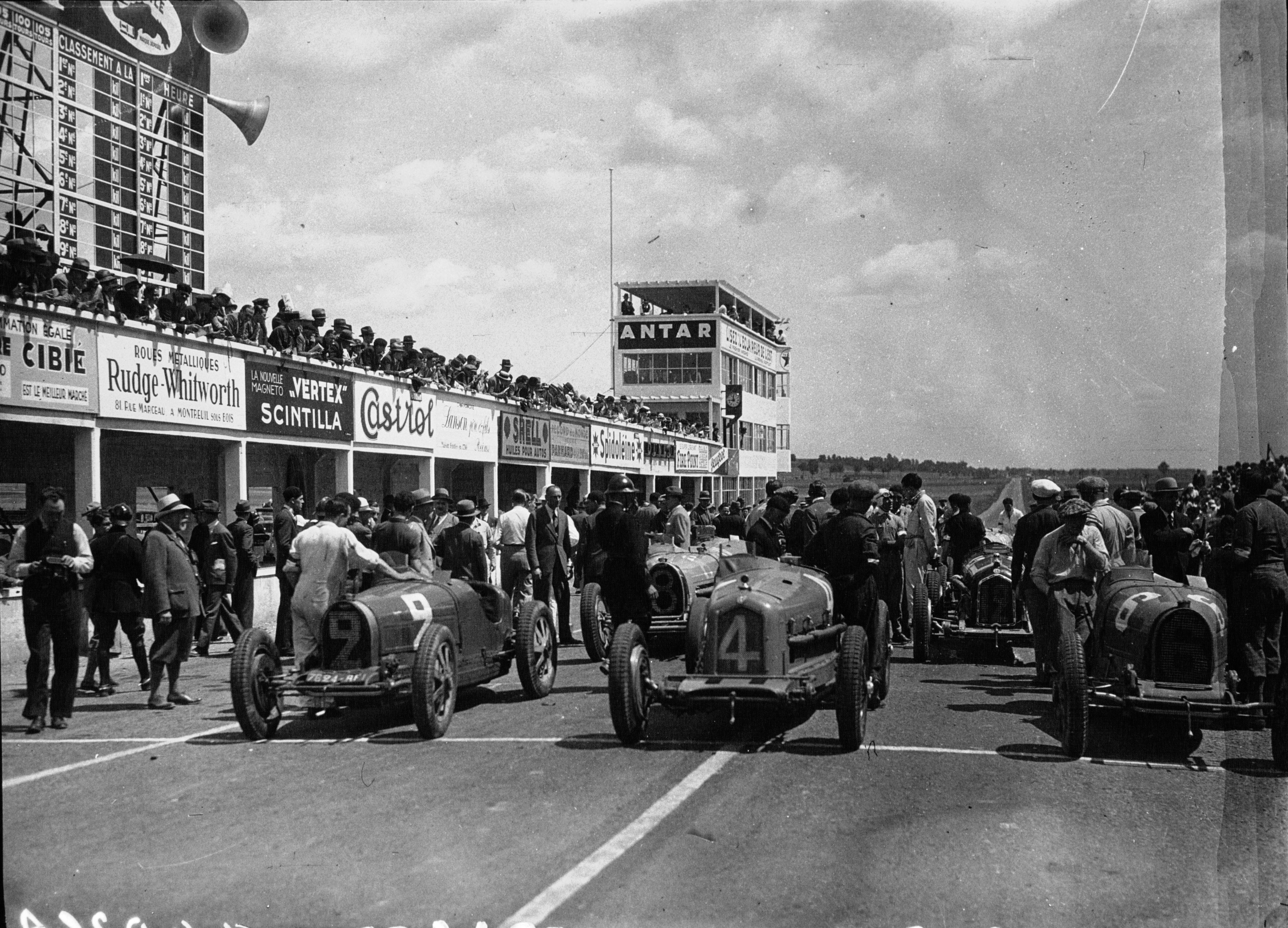
Grid before the race

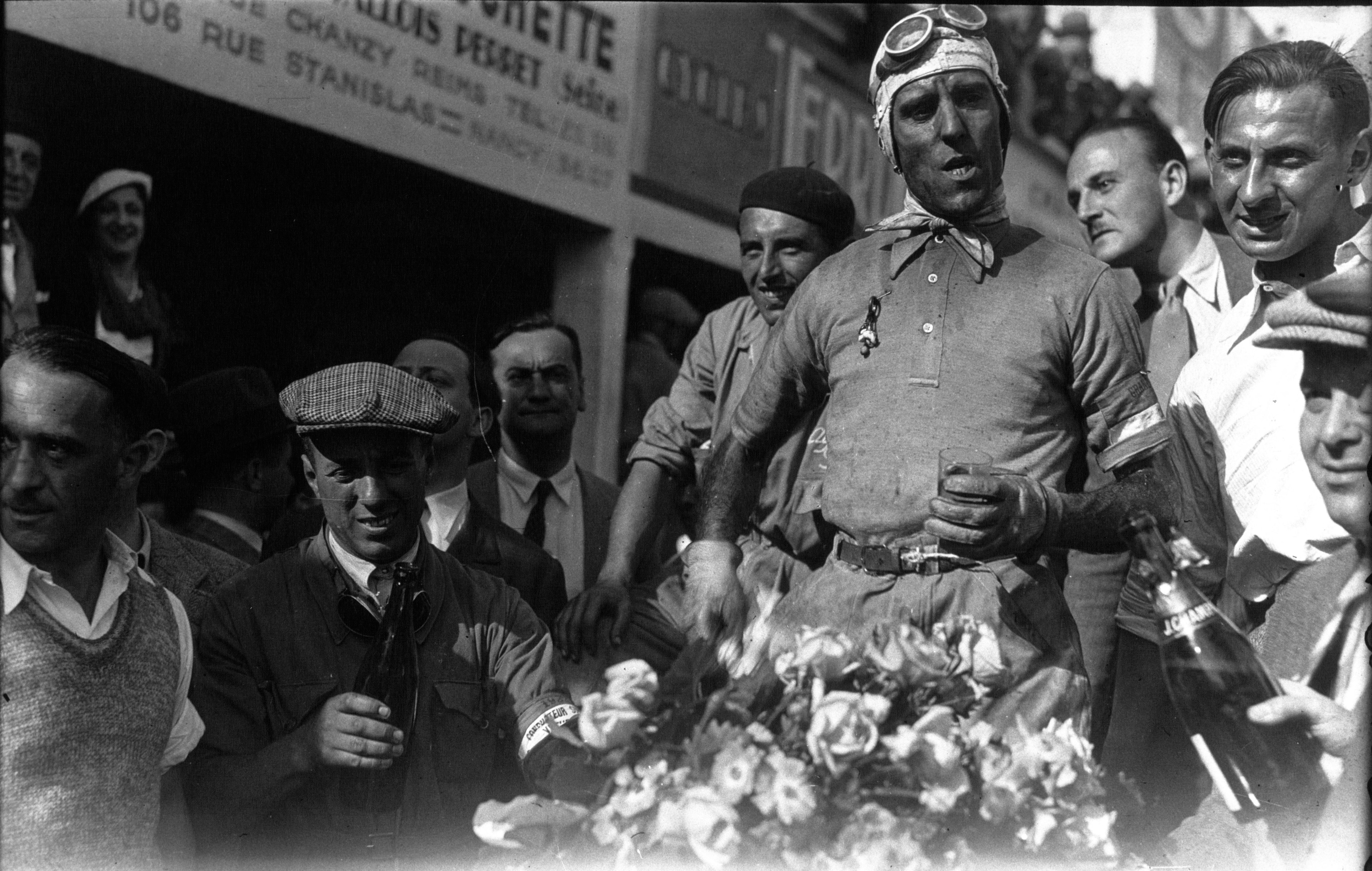
Winner Tazio Nuvolari

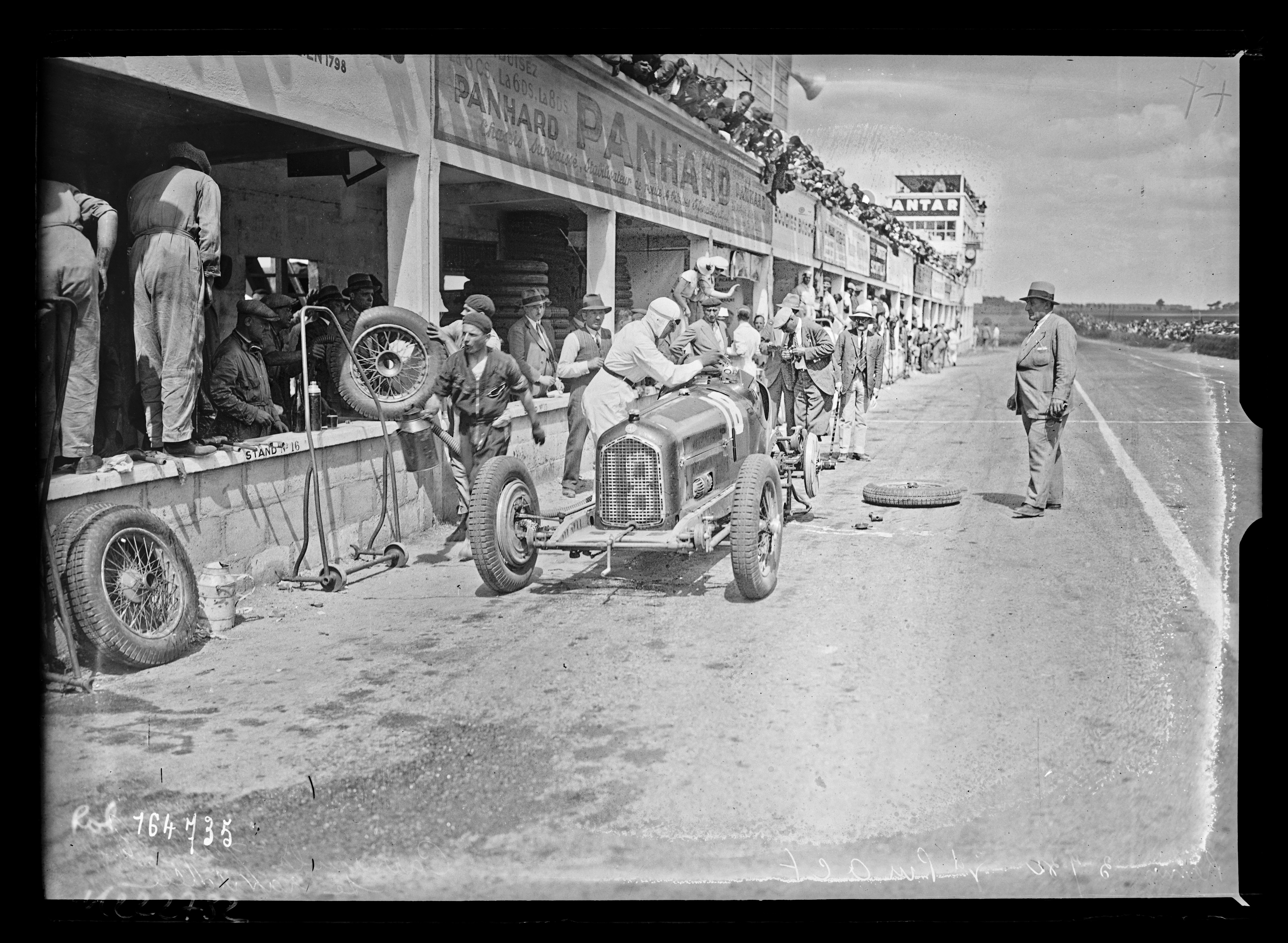
Rudolf Caracciola placed third driving an Alfa Romeo Tipo B.

The 1932 French Grand Prix (official name: XVIII Grand Prix de l'Automobile Club de France) was a Grand Prix motor race held at Reims-Gueux on 3 July 1932. The race lasted for 5 hours, and was not run over a fixed distance.

The race was won by Tazio Nuvolari driving an Alfa Romeo Tipo B.

== Classification ==
=== Race ===
Pos	No	Driver	Team	Car	Laps	Time/Retired	Grid	Points
1	12	(Italy) Tazio Nuvolari	Alfa Corse	Alfa Romeo Tipo B	92		5	1
2	30	(Italy) Baconin Borzacchini	Alfa Corse	Alfa Romeo Tipo B	92			2
3	18	(Germany) Rudolf Caracciola	Alfa Corse	Alfa Romeo Tipo B	92		7	3
4	32	(Monaco) Louis Chiron	Ettore Bugatti	Bugatti T51	91	+1 Lap	11	4
5	44	(France) René Dreyfus	R. Dreyfus	Bugatti T51	90	+2 Laps	15	4
6	42	(United Kingdom) William Grover-Williams	Williams	Bugatti T51	90	+2 Laps	14	4
7	24	(Italy) Goffredo Zehender	G. Zehender	Alfa Romeo Monza	84	+8 Laps	8	4
8	46	(France) Pierre Félix	P. Félix	Alfa Romeo Monza	82	+10 Laps	16	4
8	46	(France) Armand Girod	P. Félix	Alfa Romeo Monza	82	+10 Laps	16	n/a
9	28	(United Kingdom) Earl Howe	Earl Howe	Bugatti T54	77	+15 Laps	10	4
9	28	(United Kingdom) Hugh Hamilton	Earl Howe	Bugatti T54	77	+15 Laps	10	n/a
Ret	4	(France) Philippe Étancelin	M. Lehoux	Alfa Romeo Monza	70	Gearbox	2	5
Ret	6	(France) Max Fourny	M. Fourny	Bugatti T35C	62		3	5
Ret	16	(France) Jean-Pierre Wimille	J.P. Wimille	Alfa Romeo Monza	54	Out of fuel	6	5
Ret	38	(France) Albert Divo	Ettore Bugatti	Bugatti T54	52	Fuel tank	13	5
Ret	36	(France) Marcel Lehoux	M. Lehoux	Bugatti T54	37	Gearbox	12	7
Ret	2	(France) Jean Gaupillat	J. Gaupillat	Bugatti T51	20		1	7
Ret	8	(Italy) Achille Varzi	Ettore Bugatti	Bugatti T54	12	Gearbox	4	7
DNS	8	(France) Jean Pesato	J. Pesato	Alfa Romeo Monza			9	8

=== Starting grid positions ===
Row 1	Pos. 3		Pos. 2		Pos. 1
	(France); Fourny; Bugatti		(France); Étancelin; Alfa Romeo		(France); Gaupillat; Bugatti
Row 2		Pos. 5		Pos. 4	
		(Italy); Nuvolari; Alfa Romeo		(Italy); Varzi; Bugatti	
Row 3	Pos. 8		Pos. 7		Pos. 6
	(Italy); Zehender; Alfa Romeo		(Germany); Caracciola; Alfa Romeo		(France); Wimille; Alfa Romeo
Row 4		Pos. 10		Pos. 9	
		(United Kingdom); Howe; Bugatti		(France); Pesato; Alfa Romeo	
Row 5	Pos. 13		Pos. 12		Pos. 11
	(France); Divo; Bugatti		(France); Lehoux; Bugatti		(Monaco); Chiron; Bugatti
Row 6		Pos. 15		Pos. 14	
		(France); Dreyfus; Bugatti		(United Kingdom); Grover-Williams; Bugatti	
Row 7	Pos.		Pos.		Pos.16
					(France); Félix; Alfa Romeo

Grand Prix Race
Previous race: 1932 Italian Grand Prix	1932 Grand Prix season Grandes Épreuves	Next race: 1932 German Grand Prix
Previous race: 1931 French Grand Prix	French Grand Prix	Next race: 1933 French Grand Prix
