= Tunis Grand Prix =

Grand Prix motor racing

- Le Bardo Street Circuit (1928-'29); Carthage Street Circuit(1931-'37); Circuit du Belvedere (1955)
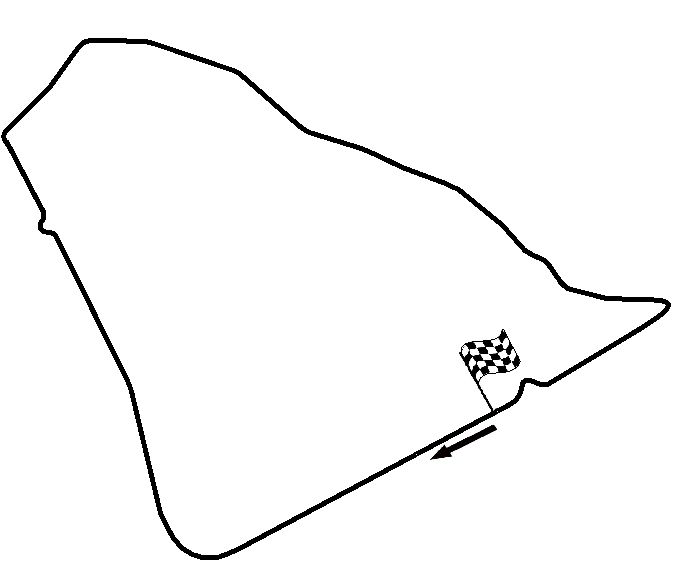

Race information
- Number of times held: 9
- First held: 1928
- Last held: 1955
- Most wins (drivers): (Italy) Achille Varzi (3)
- Most wins (constructors): (France) Bugatti (3)

Last race (1955)

Pole position

Podium
- 1. (Italy) Luigi Piotti; Ferrari; 2. (Italy) Luigi Bordonaro; Ferrari; 3. (France) Claude Storez; Porsche

Fastest lap
- (Italy) Luigi Piotti; Ferrari; 1:36.1

The Tunis Grand Prix or Grand Prix de Tunis was a motor race held in the 1920s and 30s in Tunis, the capital of the African colony of the French protectorate of Tunisia.

A race was held originally as an open-wheel motor race on a street circuit at Le Bardo, west of Tunis. The first race was held on 3 June 1928, when Algerian-based driver Marcel Lehoux won the 200-mile race in his Bugatti T35C by a large margin over Marcel Joly and Guy Cloitre in a field mainly of Bugattis and Amilcars. November the following year saw Italian driver Gastone Brilli-Peri win in a works Alfa Romeo P2 after the early retirements of team mates Achille Varzi and Baconin Borzacchini.

After a year off, the race returned in 1931 at a new venue, a much larger triangular highway circuit laid out between the then separate cities of Tunis and Carthage. The 1931 season-opening race was much more serious in its entry with eleven European grand prix and 16 1.5-litre cars racing with the smaller motor cycle-powered cars having disappeared. Achille Varzi in a back-door works Bugatti T51 won on the debut of the new car and Varzi's first race in a Bugatti, ahead of Luigi Fagioli in a works Maserati 26M and Marcel Lehoux in a (Bugatti). Varzi won the following year against Lehoux and Philippe Etancelin (Alfa Romeo). 1933 saw the Alfa Romeos sweep Bugatti aside with the Scuderia Ferrari entries of Tazio Nuvolari and Baconin Borzacchini finishing one-two ahead of the Maserati of Goffredo Zehender.

The 1934 race was cancelled and when racing returned in 1935, Varzi was back with his new team, Auto Union. The only German car in the field dominated the race and Varzi's A Type finished four minutes clear of Jean-Pierre Wimille's Bugatti T59 and two laps ahead of Philippe Etancelin's Maserati 6C. The increasing dominance of German cars and the reduced status of races outside of the European championship saw entries plummet for 1936 with just eleven cars starting. Varzi had an enormous accident in his Auto Union on a terrible day for the team which saw another of its C Types destroyed by fire. Rudolf Caracciola won in his Mercedes-Benz W25 ahead of Carlo Pintacuda's Alfa Romeo 8C and Jean-Pierre Wimille (Bugatti T59).

The 1937 race became a sportscar event held over three heats which was won by Raymond Sommer in a Talbot T-150C ahead of a fleet Delahaye 135s led by René Dreyfus and Laury Schell.

The race was not held again until 1955, again as a sports car race with a small 14-car entry in a public park as the Circuito du Belvedere. The race, held over three heats, saw a pair of Ferrari 750 Monzas take home the silverware with Luigi Piotti and Luigi Bordonaro driving with the rest of the placings filled with 2.0-litre cars.

From 2000 to 2008, a historic revival event was organised in the Circuito du Belvedere parkland circuit.

Another event called the Tunisian Grand Prix was held in 1943. This very informal event was organised by allied soldiers after the fall of Tunisia. To give lie to German claims they had left nothing usable behind in Tunisia, allied personnel utilised vehicles abandoned by the Germans to stage a motor race around an airfield. Australian officer Jack Bartle won the race, driving a Citroën.

== Winners ==
Results sourced from:

Year	Driver	Constructor	Location	Report
1928	(France) Marcel Lehoux	Bugatti	Bardo street circuit	Report
1929	(Italy) Gastone Brilli-Peri	Alfa Romeo	Bardo street circuit	Report
1930	Not held			
1931	(Italy) Achille Varzi	Bugatti	Carthage Street Circuit	Report
1932	(Italy) Achille Varzi	Bugatti	Carthage Street Circuit	Report
1933	(Italy) Tazio Nuvolari	Alfa Romeo	Carthage Street Circuit	Report
1934	Not held			
1935	(Italy) Achille Varzi	Auto Union	Carthage Street Circuit	Report
1936	(Germany) Rudolf Caracciola	Mercedes-Benz	Carthage Street Circuit	Report
1937	(France) Raymond Sommer	Talbot	Carthage Street Circuit	Report
1938 –54	Not held			
1955	(Italy) Luigi Piotti	Ferrari	Circuito du Belvedere	Report
