= Stanisław Czaykowski =

Polish racing driver (1899–1933)

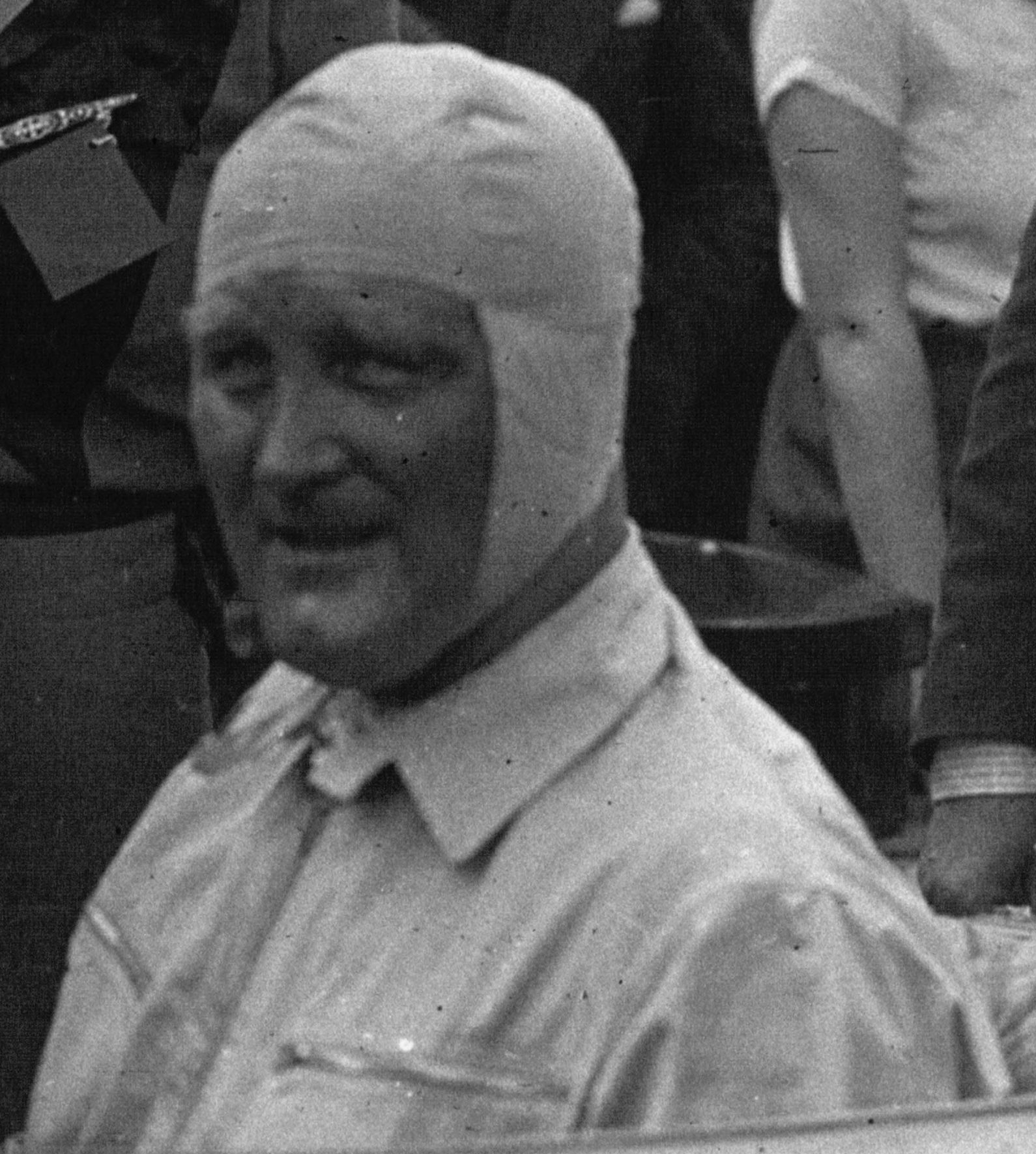
- Czaykowski in 1932
- Nationality: (Poland) Polish
- Born: 10 June 1899 The Hague, Holland
- Died: 10 September 1933 (aged 34) Monza, Italy

European Championship
- Years active: 1930–1933
- Teams: Bugatti (1930, 1933)
- Starts: 2

Count Stanisław Michel Frederic Marie Czaykowski, also known as Stanislas Czaykowski and Stanislaus Czaykowski (10 June 1899 – 10 September 1933) was a Polish Grand Prix motor racing driver.

In 1930 and 1933, Czaykowski competed in the French Grand Prix. In 1931, he won the non-championship Casablanca Grand Prix, finished second in the Dieppe and Comminges Grands Prix, and placed third in Marne, Monza and Brignole Grands Prix. In 1932, he won the non-championship Provence Grand Prix and came third in the Casablanca and Nîmes Grands Prix.

In 1932 and 1933, he competed in the 24 Hours of Le Mans. In 1933, Czaykowski won the British Empire Trophy.

He was one of three drivers who died during the 1933 Monza Grand Prix at the Autodromo Nazionale di Monza, along with Baconin Borzacchini and Giuseppe Campari.

== Complete European Championship results ==
(key) (Races in bold indicate pole position)

| Year | Entrant | Make | 1 | 2 | 3 | 4 | 5 |
|---|---|---|---|---|---|---|---|
| 1930 | Private | Bugatti | 500 | BEL | FRA; 4 | | |
| 1933 | Private | Bugatti | MCO | FRA; Ret | BEL | ITA | ESP |
