= Pau Grand Prix =

Motor race held in Pau

- Circuit de Pau-Ville

Race information
- Number of times held: 73
- First held: 1933
- Most wins (drivers): (United Kingdom) Jim Clark (4)
- Most wins (constructors): (Italy) Dallara (12)
- Circuit length: 2.760 km (1.714 miles)
- Race length: 91.1 km (56.562 miles)
- Laps: 16

Last race (2023)

Pole position
- (Canada) Kevin Foster; FFSA; 1:24.426

Podium
- 1. (France) Enzo Peugeot; FFSA; 00:46:06.988; 2. (France) Evan Giltaire; FFSA; +2.750 s; 3. (Belgium) Yani Stevenheydens; FFSA; +6.007 s

Fastest lap
- (Japan) Hiyu Yamakoshi; FFSA; 1:18.852

Circuit de Pau-Ville
- Location: Pau, France
- Coordinates: 43°17′33″N 000°21′47″W
- FIA Grade: 3
- Opened: 19 February 1933; 93 years ago
- Major events: Former: TCR Europe (2023); French F4 (2011–2019, 2022–2023); FIA ETCR (2022); FFSA GT (1999, 2001–2003, 2005, 2017–2019); WTCR Race of France (2022); Euroformula Open (2019, 2022); WTCC Race of France (2007–2009); Formula Renault Eurocup (2017); FIA Formula 3 European Championship (2011–2012, 2014–2018); Formula 3 Euro Series (2003–2005, 2008); FIA European Formula 3 Cup (1999–2003); F3000 (1985–1998); European F2 (1964–1984)
- Website: http://www.grandprixdepau.fr/

Grand Prix Circuit (1935–present)
- Length: 2.769 km (1.721 mi)
- Turns: 15
- Race lap record: 1:09.788 ( (Germany) Maximilian Günther, Dallara F316, 2017, F3)

Original Circuit (1933)
- Length: 2.649 km (1.646 mi)
- Turns: 14
- Race lap record: 2:04.000 ( (France) Philippe Étancelin, Alfa Romeo Monza, 1933, FL)

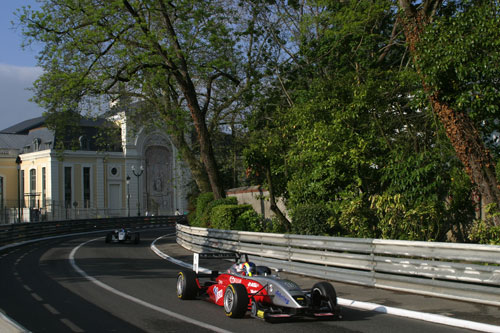
Brazilian driver Átila Abreu drives the picturesque Pau Circuit in 2005

The Pau Grand Prix (French: Grand Prix de Pau) is a motor race held in Pau, in the Pyrénées-Atlantiques department of southwestern France. The French Grand Prix was held at Pau in 1930, leading to the annual Pau Grand Prix being inaugurated in 1933. It was not run during World War II and in 2020–2021 due to the COVID-19 pandemic.

The race takes place around the centre of the city, where public roads are closed to form a street circuit, and over the years the event has variously conformed to the rules of Grand Prix racing, Formula One, Formula Two, Formula 3000, Formula Three, Formula Libre, sports car racing, and touring car racing.

In 2021, Autocar included the Pau Grand Prix in its list of "The 10 best street circuits in the world".

== Circuit ==
The race is run around a 2.769 km (1.721 mi) long street circuit, the "Circuit de Pau-Ville" laid out around the French town, and is in many ways similar to the more famous Formula One Monaco Grand Prix. About 20 km (12 mi) to the west of the city, there is a 3.030 km (1.883 mi) long club track named Circuit Pau-Arnos.

For the event, cars are set up with greater suspension travel than is typically utilised at a purpose-built racing circuit to minimise the effect of running on the more undulating tarmac of the street circuit.

== History ==
=== Circuit du Sud-Ouest (1900–1901) ===
In 1900, as part of the 'Semaine de Pau', the newly created Automobile-club du Béarn held a race on a 300 km (190 mi) road circuit, called the Circuit du sud-ouest (Pau–Tarbes–Bayonne–Pau). The race was given the same name as the circuit, and was won by René de Knyff.

In 1901, for the second event, the race had individual prizes for the four separate classes of entrants:

- The Grand Prix de Pau (cars 650 kg or over) was awarded to Maurice Farman (Panhard 24 hp). (Note: By the turn of the 20th century the term Grand Prix had become common parlance in France, having been used since the Grand Prix de Paris horse race in 1886 (e.g. the Grand Prix de Paris for Cyclists in 1895) (New York Times, July 18, 1895, Grand Prix de Paris for Cyclists). Thus in the Anglophone world the main winner's prize (Grand Prix de Pau) subsequently became synonymous with the event.(Leif Snellman (2002-05-27). "The first Grand Prix". 8W. FORIX.))
- The Grand Prix du Palais d'Hiver (400–650 kg 'Light car' class) was awarded to Henri Farman (Darracq).
- The second Grand Prix du Palais d'Hiver (under 400 kg Voiturettes) as awarded to Louis Renault (Renault).
- The Prix du Béarn was awarded to Osmont in a 'De Dion' tricycle.

=== French Grand Prix (1930) ===
The French Grand Prix was held at Pau in 1930.

=== Starts of the Grand Prix de Pau ===
Map of the Pau circuit in 1933

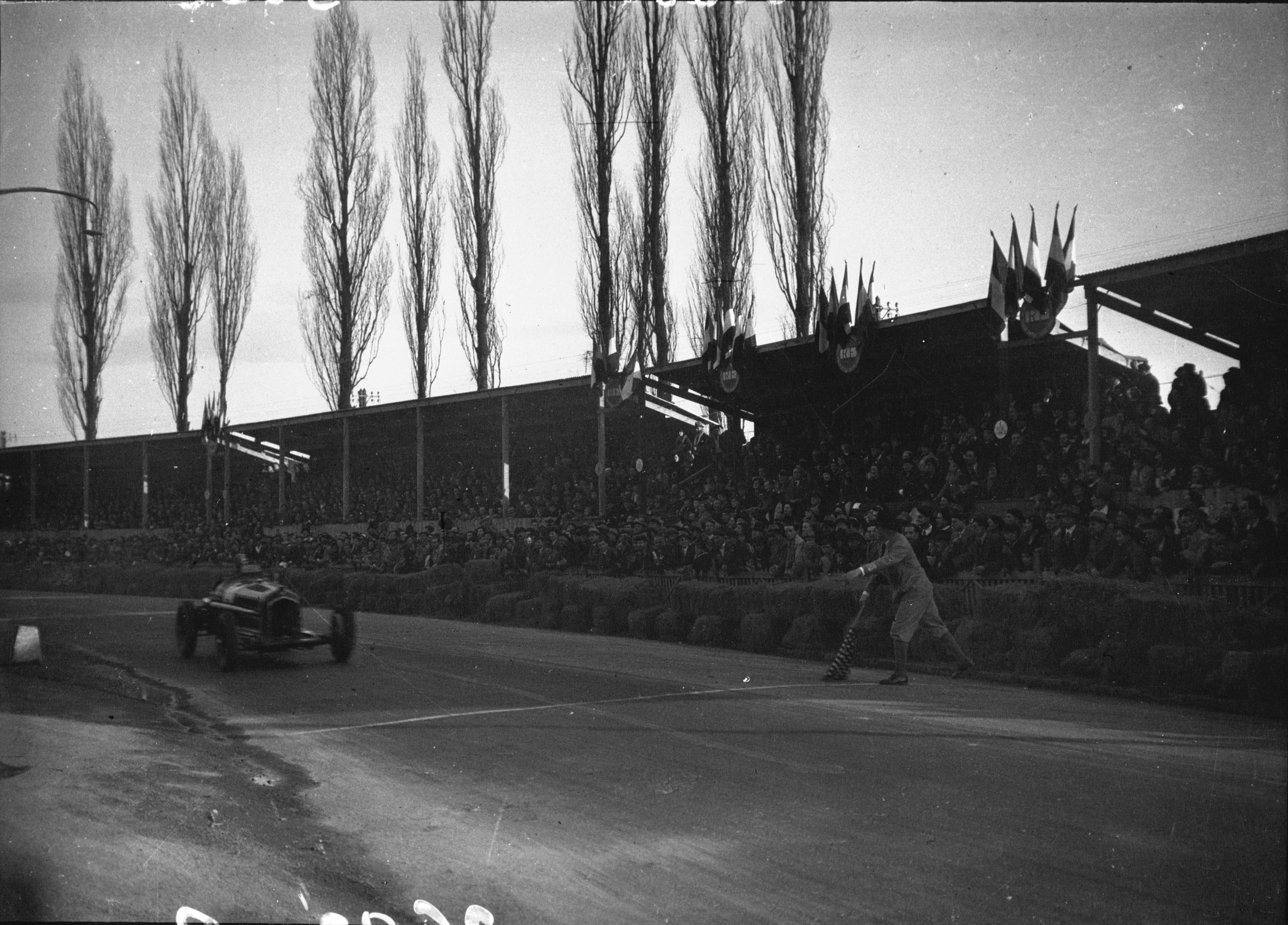
Nuvolari wins 1935 Pau Grand Prix

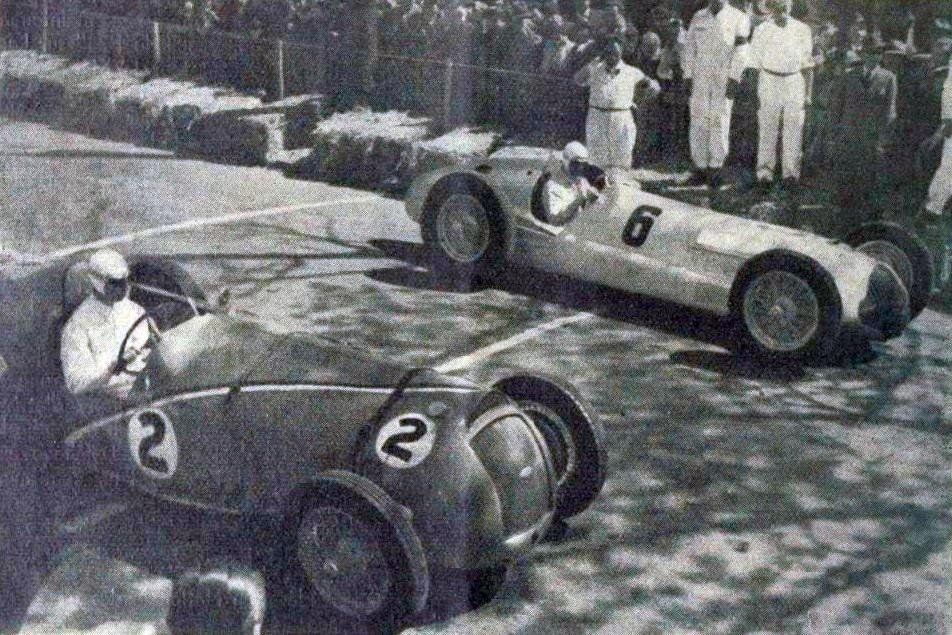
1938 pole sitter René Dreyfus in the Delahaye 145 and Caracciola in the Mercedes W154 on the starting grid

The 1933 Grand Prix de Pau was held in February with snow still on the ground. The race was won by Marcel Lehoux driving a Bugatti.

There was no Grand Prix in 1934, and in 1935 the event returned with a modified route that bypassed Beaumont Park – the route that is still in use today – and the location of the pits was also moved. In 1937, the regulations were changed and Grand Prix cars were restricted to 4500 cc or 3000 cc supercharged. The 1938 Pau Grand Prix was the scene of a symbolic duel between French René Dreyfus (Delahaye 145) who defeated the Germans Rudolf Caracciola and Hermann Lang who shared a Mercedes-Benz W154 with a pit stop in between while Dreyfus did not stop and won. In 1939, another duel took place between two Mercedes teammates, Hermann Lang and Manfred von Brauchitsch; Lang won the race.

The event took place regularly with a race almost every year, except during World War II, but returned to the calendar in 1947. The 1947 and 1948 events were very successful keeping the public in suspense from start to finish. In 1948, the young Nello Pagani won, defeating many of the famous drivers of the time, such as Raymond Sommer, Philippe Etancelin and Jean-Pierre Wimille.

=== 1950s and early 1960s ===
In 1949, Juan Manuel Fangio won by dominating the event. He started from pole position as in the previous year, but also achieved the fastest lap and gained victory.

The Frenchman Jean Behra won in 1954, before a record crowd, driving a Simca-Gordini. His win was a result of a duel with Ferrari driver Maurice Trintignant at a time when many French manufacturers were no longer present at the GP.

On 11 April 1955, the Italian Mario Alborghetti died in a racing accident, the Maserati driver apparently confused his pedals after being distracted and crashed against some hay bales. His death was announced to spectators after the race.

The 1956 race was cancelled following the tragic accident at Le Mans the previous year. Improvements to the circuit were made for the 1957 event, both in terms of safety and the comfort of competitors and spectators.

After being run to Formula Two regulations in 1958–1960, limiting the capacity to 1500 cm^{3} Formula One in 1961 allowed the Grand Prix de Pau back in the spotlight ahead of the Monaco Grand Prix. In the early 1960s, the event was won by such famous drivers as Jack Brabham, Maurice Trintignant, and Jim Clark (who achieved his first victory in a Formula One car in Pau Grand Prix in 1961, and went on to win the Pau Grand Prix three more times in 1963–1965).

=== Formula Two period (1964–1984) ===
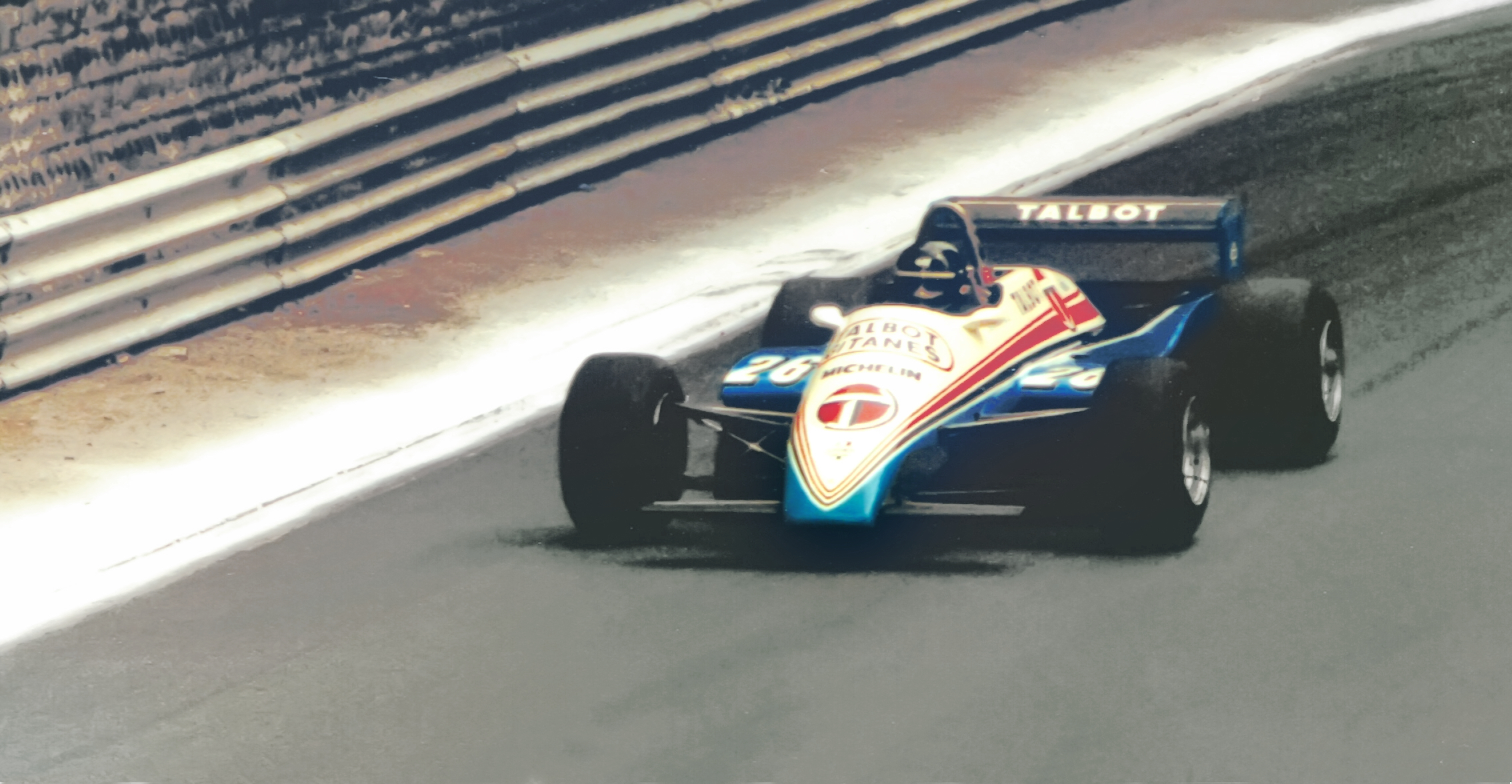
Jacques Laffite in F1 roadshow in Pau (1982)

In 1964, after switching the format of the Grand Prix again from Formula One to Formula Two, Jim Clark won the Grand Prix for the second consecutive year, repeating his success for the third time in a row the following year. In 1967, drivers such as Jean-Pierre Beltoise and Henri Pescarolo made their debut at Pau. Jochen Rindt won his first Grand Prix de Pau that year before winning twice more in 1969 and 1970. In 1968, Jackie Stewart won with Matra Sports.

During this period, several former and future world champions also raced at the event: Graham Hill, Jackie Stewart, Jack Brabham, Denny Hulme, and Emerson Fittipaldi. There also appeared more young French drivers like Johnny Servoz-Gavin, Jean-Pierre Jarier, Jean-Pierre Jabouille, Patrick Depailler and François Cevert, as well as other drivers such as Reine Wisell and Peter Gethin, who won the Grand Prix in 1971 and 1972 respectively.

In 1973, the event was threatened by problems with the homologation of the circuit, it was quickly brought up to standard by the personal intervention of the Mayor André Labarrère (who had been in office since 1971). François Cevert won that year.

Drivers such as Jacques Laffite, Patrick Depailler and René Arnoux won in Pau, and many F1 drivers at the time continued to race in Formula Two. In 1980, the 40th Grand Prix de Pau was won by the French driver Richard Dallest.

=== Formula 3000 (1985–1998) ===
In 1985, Formula 3000 replaced Formula Two as the "second-division" formula below Formula One and the Grand Prix de Pau became part of the new Formula 3000 European Championship. That same year, Alain Prost became co-organiser of the race.

In 1989, Jean Alesi took his first victory after a turbulent start (the race was restarted four times because of successive problems on the grid, and a spectacular crash).

In 1994, French driver Nicolas Leboissetier had a spectacular accident at the Virage de la gare ("train station corner"), reviving the climate of tension that followed the deaths of Ayrton Senna and Roland Ratzenberger at Imola during the 1994 San Marino Grand Prix.

The Pau-born driver David Dussau participated in the race in 1996. He was well-positioned on the grid, but was forced to retire because of a crash.

Colombian Juan-Pablo Montoya won the race twice, in 1997 and 1998.

The French Supertouring Championship was a support event from 1993 to 2000.

At the end of 1998, it was decided that all Formula 3000 races would be organised exclusively as the curtain-raiser of European-based Formula One Grand Prix, and thus the event in Pau could no longer be run as a Formula 3000 race.

=== Formula Three (1999–2006) ===
Following the disappearance of the Formula 3000 race in Pau, the FIA organised the new European Formula Three Cup in 1999. Formula Three, however, had already come to Pau before as part of the French championship and a support race of F3000. The Grand Prix format also changed completely: the race became shorter (40 minutes instead of 1.5 hours in F3000).

The switch to a more junior formula raised an outcry from the passionate spectators because at that time the European Cup Formula Three was not sufficiently popular in motorsport. The first edition of the European Cup is won by Benoît Tréluyer. This event also included the French Formula Three Championship race, which was a non-championship race.

In 2000, the European Cup is stopped and replaced by the new championship Formula 3 Euro Series, a fusion of the French and German championships. Over the years the Grand Prix became a very important race in the Formula Three calendar. In 2001 the race was won by Anthony Davidson from the pole position, driving a Carlin Dallara-Honda. Davidson went on to win the Euro F3 series that year.

The 2005 edition saw victory for a young Lewis Hamilton, who went on to become a Formula One World Champion three years later.

In 2006, Formula Three was back on the calendar but within the British Championship, and the two races were won by Romain Grosjean who was not a regular competitor in the championship.

The FFSA Silhouettes was a support event from 2001 to 2004, whereas the FFSA GT Championship raced in 1999, 2001, 2002, 2003 and 2005. The British GT Championship visited Pau in 2006 with a few FFSA GT guests.

=== WTCC (2007–2009) ===
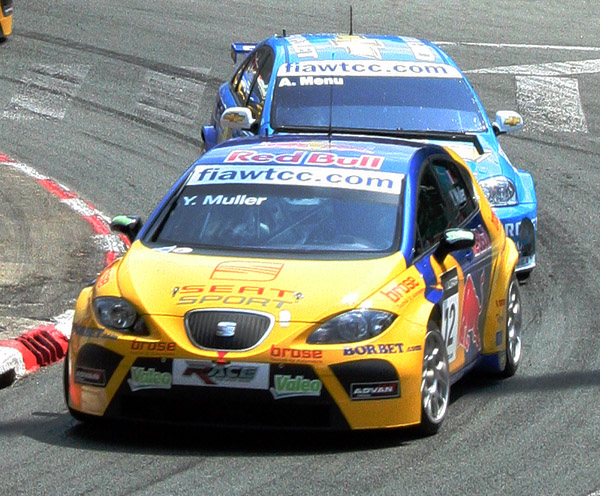
Yvan Muller in Seat León at the 2007 Pau Grand Prix

From 2007 to 2009, the event changed to touring cars, hosting the World Touring Car Championship (WTCC) for the Race of France. The F3 Euro Series returned to support the WTCC during the 2008 event which saw the Brazilian driver Augusto Farfus (WTCC) involved in a crash in the Foch Chicane.

In 2009, after a number of incidents on the opening lap of the second race, the decision was made to deploy the safety car. However, the 'SC' boards informing the drivers of a safety car period had only just been displayed when the safety car driver drove onto the track without being given the order to do so. Franz Engstler, leading the race at the time, was in the process of slowing down when he came around the first corner and had a heavy collision with the safety car which was nearly stopped in the middle of the track. The FIA subsequently sanctioned the officials in charge of the safety car at the event.

The 2009 event featured the Formula Renault 2.0 West European Cup; the French Formula Renault had last raced at Pau in 2006.

Following a decision taken by the municipality for financial reasons, the Grand Prix was suspended in 2010, and the WTCC was no longer from this point.

=== Return of Formula Three (2011–2012) ===
The event was revived in 2011 by Peter Auto and with the return of Formula Three with the International Trophy as the main event. However, the race was shorter than in previous years and only had fifteen drivers on the entry list, so there were few spectators. In addition, the only French driver, Tom Dillmann, retired on the fourth lap of the race, which was won by the German Marco Wittmann.

One of the most important support races of the weekend was the first electric Grand Prix, run with cars with full electric drivetrains. The category included mostly French drivers such as Soheil Ayari, Franck Lagorce and Olivier Panis. Also, the Formula Renault 2.0 Alps made their first visit to Pau.

In 2012, the organisers announced that in addition to the International Trophy there would also be a round of the British Formula Three Championship. But on March 9, 2012, the World Motor Sport Council of the FIA announced that it would be part of a new FIA Formula 3 European Championship, revived from the previous series which ended in 1984. The Italian Raffaele Marciello won the Grand Prix after dominating qualifying and the race sprint. This victory made him one of the youngest winners of the Pau Grand Prix at only 18 years of age. There were no French drivers in the event

The Porsche Carrera Cup France was also added to the program for 2012 and one of the drivers was Sébastien Loeb and his team Sébastien Loeb Racing. The Alsatian dominated the weekend and impressed when he won both races with leads of over ten seconds.

At the second Grand Prix de Pau electric, the two races were won by the same winners as the previous year, but in reverse order; the first race was won by Adrien Tambay, the second by Mike Parisy. The participants included the Canadian driver Marc-Antoine Camirand (from Quebec) who, with his car in the colours of the Grand Prix de Trois-Rivières, was present to pay tribute to the Formula One driver Gilles Villeneuve and to bring the electric GP to Trois-Rivières.

The 2012 event received between 22,000 and 23,000 spectators, 10 to 15% more than in 2011.

=== Formula Renault 2.0 Pau Trophy (2013) ===
The 2013 event took place on 18, 19 and 20 May. At the Whit Monday holiday, an historical tradition of Pau Grand Prix, the headliner should have been the British Formula Three Championship. But this series, with a lot of concurrence with the FIA Formula 3 European Championship, was forced to reduce its calendar to 4 events and so cancelled many rounds including Pau. The headliner would, therefore, take place as a non-championship "special" race for Formula Renault 2.0 open to several European championships teams and drivers: the Formula Renault 2.0 Pau Trophy.

At the end of January 2013, the organisers announced that Sébastien Loeb and Jacques Villeneuve would be present in Pau in the Mitjet 2L category.

=== Return of European Formula Three (2014–2022) ===
From 2014 to 2018, the Pau Grand Prix was headlined by the FIA Formula 3 European Championship. The Formula Renault 2.0 Alps also returned to Pau in 2014. The GT4 European Series joined the event in 2016, being replaced by the FFSA GT Championship from 2017 to 2019. For 2019 and 2022, the Euroformula Open Championship became the new headlining formula race. 2020 race was cancelled due to the COVID-19 pandemic, and there was no race planned for 2021. The World Touring Car Cup and FIA ETCR – eTouring Car World Cup joined the event in 2022.

=== Formula Four (2023) ===
In 2023, the Euroformula Open Championship was intended to be the headlining formula race, however the Euroformula Open race was cancelled on 5 May due to a misunderstanding between the organisers of Euroformula and Pau GP organizers linked with the possibility to run on sustainable fuel during the weekend. After the cancellation of Euroformula race, the weekend program was updated and French F4 Championship was designated to be the titular race, in which the third Formula 4 race would be considered the Grand Prix. Besides French F4 Championship, TCR Europe Touring Car Series joined the event in 2023.

=== Decline (2024–present) ===
Due to financial difficulties of the Association Sportive de l'Automobile Club Basco-Béarnais (ASAC BB), the future of the Pau Grand Prix seemed uncertain. At the end of 2023, the ASAC BB announced that the Pau Grand Prix would be cancelled ahead of the 2024 season, with a plan to return in 2025.

On October 8, 2024, the ASAC BB appeared before the Pau Judicial Court requesting to be placed under safeguard proceedings due to unpaid dues of approximately €150,000. On December 8, 2024, ASAC BB took part in a general assembly for the city of Pau, which revealed that the institution had experienced financial difficulties since 2022. Although the race is expected to return around the 2025-2027 seasons, the Pau Grand Prix would be jeopardized for the 2025 season ahead of furthering financial difficulties.

== Events ==
Former

- Euroformula Open Championship (2019, 2022)
- European Formula Two Championship (1964–1984)
- FFSA GT Championship (1999, 2001–2003, 2005, 2017–2019)
- FIA ETCR – eTouring Car World Cup (2022)
- FIA European Formula 3 Cup (1999–2003)
- FIA Formula 3 European Championship (2011–2012, 2014–2018)
- Formula 3 Euro Series (2003–2005, 2008)
- Formula Renault 2.0 Alps (2011–2012, 2014–2015)
- Formula Renault 2.0 West European Cup (1971–1972, 1975–2006, 2008–2009)
- Formula Renault Eurocup (2017)
- Formula Renault Northern European Cup (2018)
- French F4 Championship (2011–2019, 2022–2023)
- French Formula Three Championship (1964–1971, 1973, 1984–1998, 2000)
- French Supertouring Championship (1977–1983, 1986, 1988, 1990–1991, 1993–2005)
- Grand Prix de Pau historique (2001–2019, 2022–2023)
- International Formula 3000 (1985–1998)
- International Formula Master (2007–2009)
- Porsche Carrera Cup France (1987–1992, 1995–1997, 2002–2006, 2012–2013)
- SEAT León Eurocup (2008)
- TCR Europe Touring Car Series (2023)
- World Touring Car Championship
  - FIA WTCC Race of France (2007–2009)
- World Touring Car Cup
  - Race of France (2022)

== Lap records ==
The outright unofficial all-time track record is 1:08.600, set by Andrea Montermini in a Reynard 92D, during qualifying for the 1992 Pau Grand Prix. As of May 2023, the fastest official race lap records at the Pau Grand Prix street circuit are listed as:

Category	Time	Driver	Vehicle	Event
Grand Prix Circuit (1935–present): 2.769 km (1.721 mi)
F3	1:09.788	Maximilian Günther	Dallara F316	2017 Pau F3 European Championship Race 2
F3000	1:09.820	Emanuele Naspetti	Reynard 92D	1992 Pau Grand Prix
Euroformula Open	1:10.608	Oliver Goethe	Dallara 320	2022 Pau Euroformula Open Race 1
International Formula Master	1:11.703	Fabio Leimer	Tatuus N.T07	2009 Pau Formula Master round
F2	1:12.370	Kenny Acheson	Ralt RH6/82	1982 Pau Grand Prix
Formula Renault 2.0	1:13.812	Martin Kodrić	Tatuus FR2.0/13	2015 Pau Formula Renault 2.0 Alps round
F4	1:17.091	Enzo Peugeot	Mygale M21-F4	2023 Pau French F4 round
GT1 (GTS)	1:18.346	Boris Derichebourg	Chrysler Viper GTS-R	2003 Pau FFSA GT round
Porsche Carrera Cup	1:19.200	Côme Ledogar	Porsche 911 (997 II) GT3 Cup 3.8	2012 Pau Porsche Carrera Cup France round
Formula Renault 1.6	1:19.832	Sacha Fenestraz	Signatech FR 1.6	2015 Pau French F4 round
TCR Touring Car	1:21.331	Mikel Azcona	Hyundai Elantra N TCR	2022 FIA WTCR Race of France
GT4	1:21.806	Simon Gachet	Audi R8 LMS GT4	2019 Pau FFSA GT round
Silhouette racing car	1:22.130	Anthony Beltoise	Ford Mondeo Silhouette	2002 Pau French Supertouring round
GT3	1:22.158	Arnaud Peyroles	Dodge Viper Competition Coupe	2006 Pau FFSA GT round
Super 2000	1:22.682	Augusto Farfus	BMW 320si	2008 FIA WTCC Race of France
ETCR	1:23.894	Tom Blomqvist	CUPRA e-Racer	2022 Pau FIA ETCR round
SEAT León Eurocup	1:25.331	Gábor Wéber	SEAT León Supercopa	2008 Pau SEAT León Eurocup round
Renault Clio Cup	1:28.255	Nicolas Milan	Renault Clio R.S. IV	2017 Pau Renault Clio Cup France round
F1	1:33.400	Jim Clark	Lotus 24	1962 Pau Grand Prix
Group 3	1:43.100	Olivier Gendebien	Ferrari 250 GT	1958 3 Hours of Pau
GP	1:46.800	Manfred von Brauchitsch	Mercedes-Benz W154	1939 Pau Grand Prix
Formula Libre	1:51.700	Tazio Nuvolari	Alfa Romeo Tipo B	1935 Pau Grand Prix
Original Circuit (1933): 2.649 km (1.646 mi)
Formula Libre	2:04.000	Philippe Étancelin	Alfa Romeo Monza	1933 Pau Grand Prix

== Historic Grand Prix ==
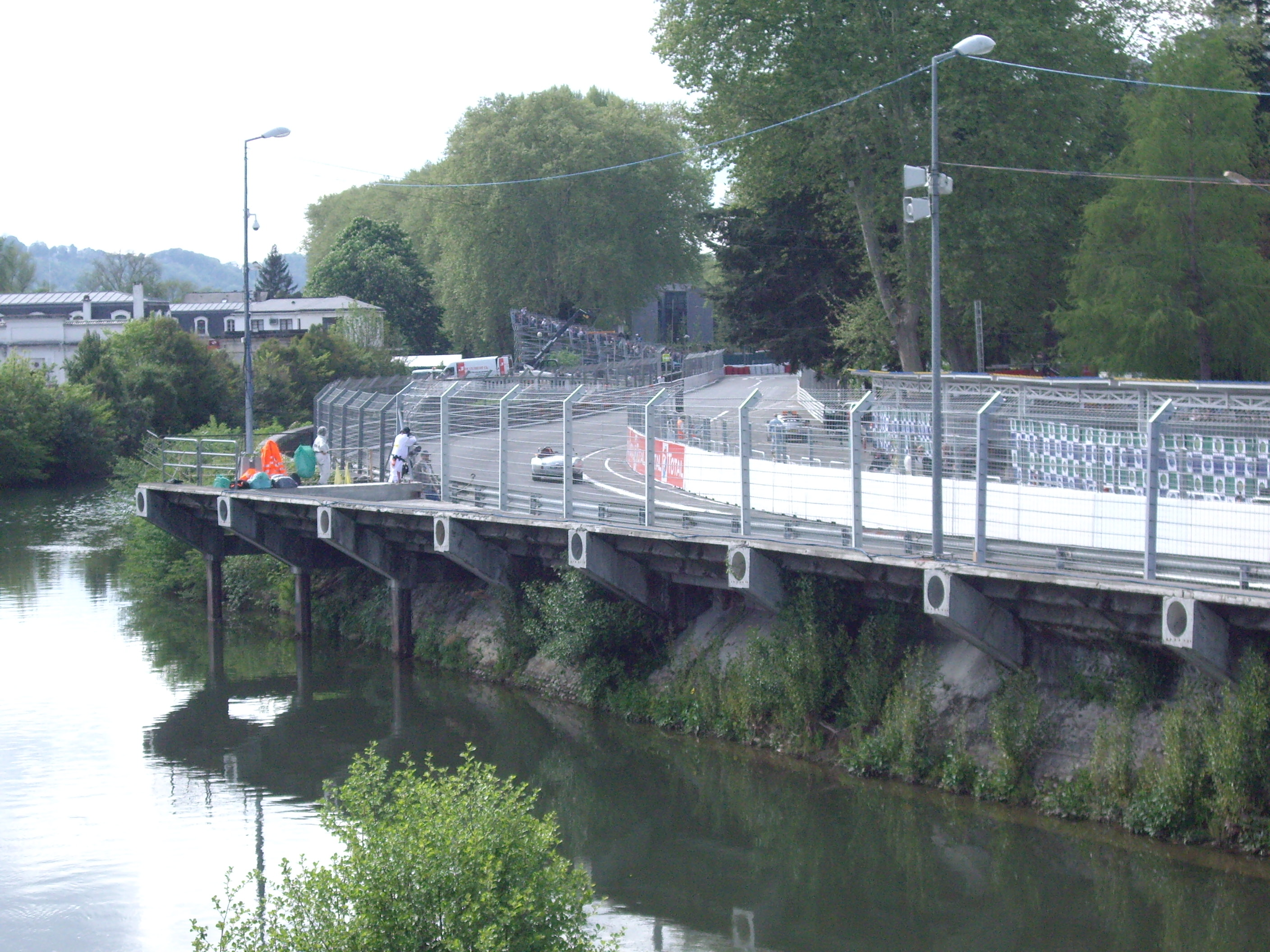
2012 Historic Races, view from the grandstand

Since 2001, races for historical cars are held one week before or after the "modern" Grand Prix. Races include events for former Formula One cars of the 1960s amongst others.

Notable races during the Grand Prix Historique de Pau since 2001:

- Trophée Argentin (Formula Two for cars built between 1950 and 1960, the event named in honour of Juan Manuel Fangio).
- Trophée de Pau (F1 of 1950 and 1960).
- Trophée Junior (Formula Junior).
- Trophée des Pyrénées (Formula Three, Formula Ford and Formula France).
- Trophée Légende (Grand Prix cars before World War II).
- Trophée Phil Hill (Grand Touring Endurance 1950 and 1960).
- Trophée Mini Classic (Touring, monotype reserved to Mini Cooper).
- Trophée Flat4 (Touring, monotype reserved to the old Porsche with Flat 4 engines).
