= Marcel Lehoux =

French racing driver and businessman (1888–1936)

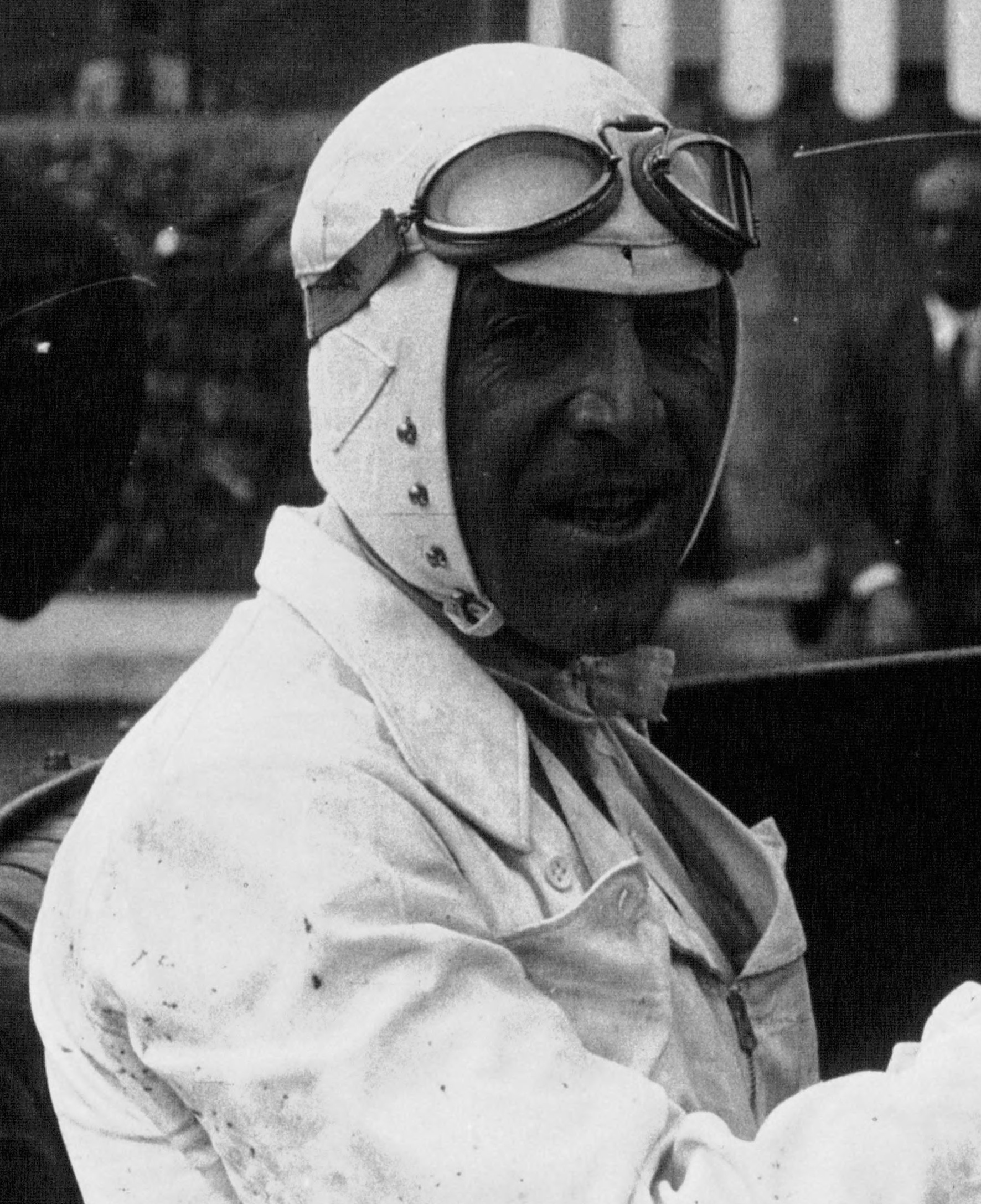
Marcel Lehoux at Monza in 1930

Marcel Lehoux (3 April 1888 – 19 July 1936) was a French racing driver and businessman.

Lehoux was born in Blois in France. His racing career was built on the back of his successful trading company that operated in French Algeria. He placed second at the Grand Prix de la Marne at Reims in 1929, behind Zenelli and ahead of his friend, Philippe Étancelin, making a Bugatti sweep of the podium. At the 1930 Algerian Grand Prix, he followed Étancelin home to second. In 1931, he shared a Bugatti with Étancelin for both the Italian and French Grands Prix, events of 10 hours duration, run to Formula Libre rules; the duo dropped out both times. He would later race for Bugatti and Scuderia Ferrari racing teams.

Lehoux died after a collision in the 1936 Deauville Grand Prix.

== Racing record ==
=== Grand Prix wins ===
Year	Grand Prix	Location	Car	Report
1928	(France) Algerian Grand Prix	Staouéli	Bugatti Type 35	Report
1928	(France) Tunis Grand Prix	Carthage	Bugatti Type 35	Report
1929	(France) Algerian Grand Prix	Staouéli	Bugatti Type 35	Report
1930	(France) Dieppe Grand Prix	Dieppe	Bugatti Type 35	Report
1931	(Switzerland) Geneva Grand Prix	Geneva	Bugatti Type 51	Report
1931	(France) Grand Prix de la Marne	Reims	Bugatti Type 51	Report
1932	(Morocco) Casablanca Grand Prix	Casablanca	Bugatti Type 54	Report
1933	(France) Pau Grand Prix	Pau	Bugatti Type 51	Report
1933	(France) Dieppe Grand Prix	Dieppe	Bugatti Type 51	Report
1933	(Italy) Monza Grand Prix	Monza	Bugatti Type 51	Report

=== Complete European Championship results ===
(key) (Races in bold indicate pole position) (Races in italics indicate fastest lap)

Year	Entrant	Chassis	Engine	1	2	3	4	5	6	7	EDC	Pts
1931	M. Lehoux	Bugatti T51	Bugatti 2.3 L8	ITA; Ret	FRA; Ret	BEL					24th	21
1932	M. Lehoux	Bugatti T51	Bugatti 2.3 L8	ITA; Ret		GER; Ret					16th	21
1932	M. Lehoux	Bugatti T54	Bugatti 5.0 L8		FRA; Ret						16th	21
1935	Scuderia Villapadierna	Maserati 8CM	Maserati 3.0 L8	MON	FRA	**BEL**; 6	GER	SUI	ITA		17th	48
1935	Scuderia Subalpina	Maserati 6C-34	Maserati 3.7 L6							ESP; 8	17th	48

== External resources ==
Review of the 1936 Deauville Grand Prix with sources and images
