= List of AIACR European Championship winners =

Formula One list

For motorsport, the following is the List of AIACR European Championship winners.

== By driver ==
Key
‡	AIACR European Champion

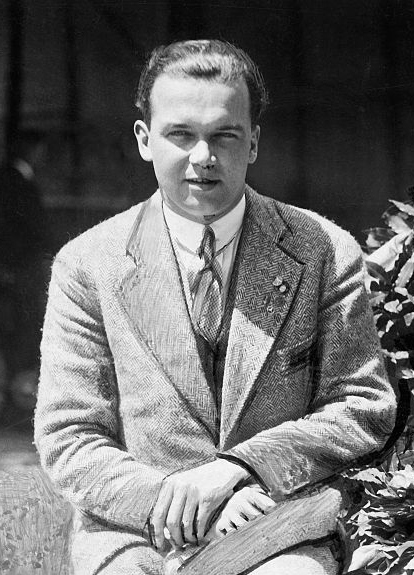
Three-time European Champion Rudolf Caracciola held the record for the most European Championship Grand Prix victories with 11

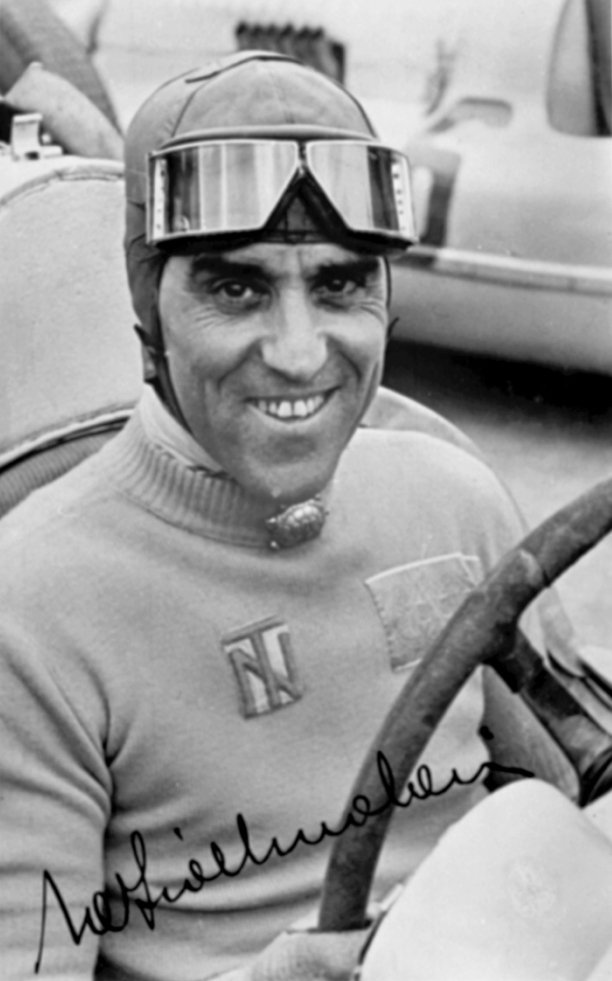
Tazio Nuvolari Was the most awarded driver in the pre F1 era, being European champion in 1932

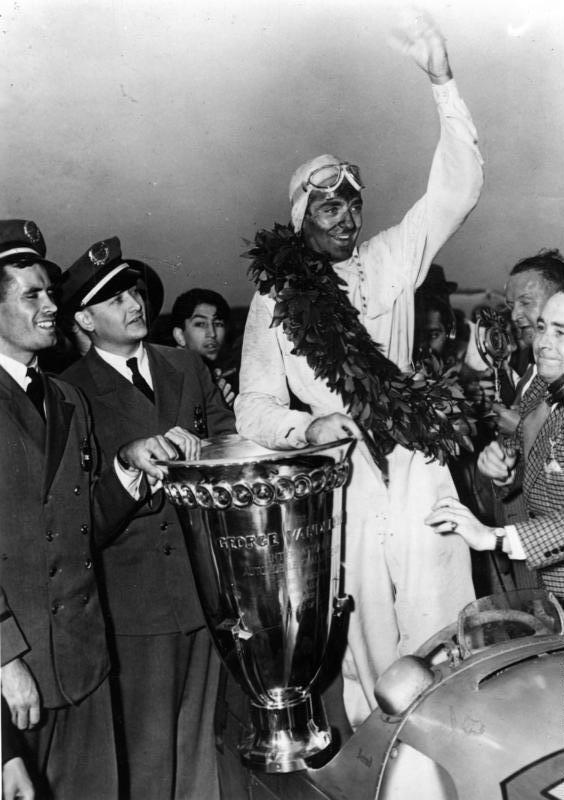
Bernd Rosemeyer Won 3 of the 4 Grand Prix of the 1936 European Championship

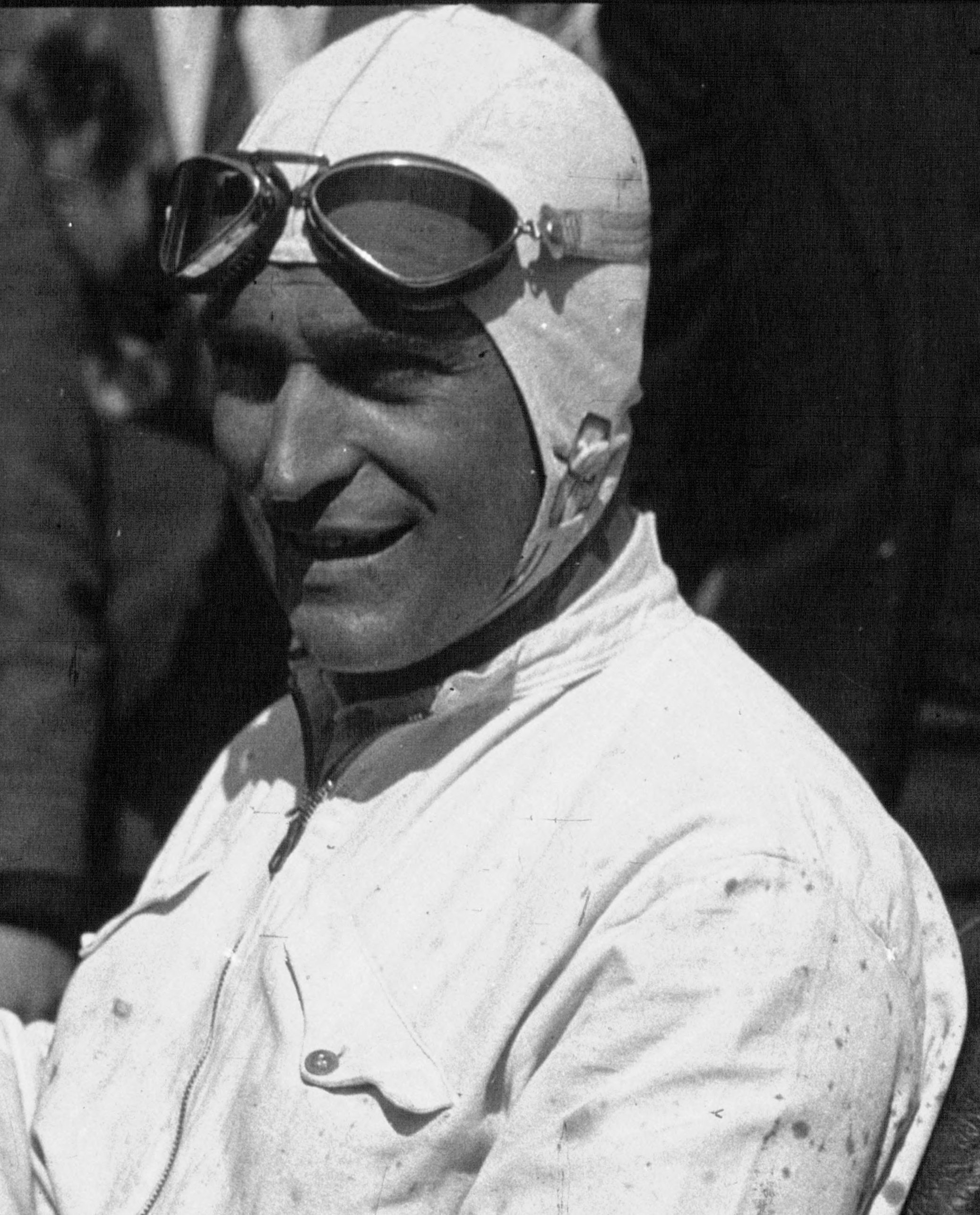
Luigi Fagioli Is the only driver to win a European Championship grand prix and a F1 World Championship grand prix

AIACR European Championship Grand Prix winners
Rank	Country	Driver	Wins	Seasons active	First win	Last win
1	Germany	Rudolf Caracciola‡	11	1931–1932, 1935–1939	1932 German Grand Prix	1939 German Grand Prix
2	Italy	Tazio Nuvolari‡	4	1931–1932, 1935–1939	1932 Italian Grand Prix	1938 Italian Grand Prix
3	Germany	Bernd Rosemeyer‡	3	1935–1937	1936 German Grand Prix	1936 Italian Grand Prix
4	Germany	Hermann Lang	2	1935–1939	1939 Belgian Grand Prix	1939 Swiss Grand Prix
5	Germany	Manfred von Brauchitsch	2	1935–1939	1937 Monaco Grand Prix	1938 French Grand Prix
6	Italy	Caberto Conelli	1	1931	1931 Belgian Grand Prix	1931 Belgian Grand Prix
7	Italy	Giuseppe Campari	1	1931–1932	1931 Italian Grand Prix	1931 Italian Grand Prix
8	United Kingdom	William Grover-Williams	1	1931–1932, 1936	1931 Belgian Grand Prix	1931 Belgian Grand Prix
9	United Kingdom	Richard Seaman	1	1936–1939	1938 German Grand Prix	1938 German Grand Prix
9	Germany	Hermann Paul Müller	1	1937–1939	1939 French Grand Prix	1939 French Grand Prix
11	Germany	Rudolf Hasse	1	1936–1939	1937 Belgian Grand Prix	1937 Belgian Grand Prix
12	Italy	Luigi Fagioli	1	1931–1932, 1935–1937	1935 Monaco Grand Prix	1935 Monaco Grand Prix
12	Monaco	Louis Chiron	1	1931–1932, 1935–1936	1931 French Grand Prix	1931 French Grand Prix
14	Italy	Achille Varzi	1	1931–1932, 1935–1937	1931 French Grand Prix	1931 French Grand Prix
15	Germany	Hans Stuck	1	1935–1939	1935 Italian Grand Prix	1935 Italian Grand Prix
16	Italy	Ferdinando Minoia‡	0	1931		

== By nationality ==
List of races won, by nationality of driver
Rank	Country	Wins	Driver(s)	No. of drivers
1	Germany	21	Rudolf Caracciola (11), Bernd Rosemeyer (3), Hermann Lang (2), Manfred von Brauchitsch (2), Hermann Paul Müller (1), Rudolf Hasse (1), Hans Stuck (1),	7
2	Italy	8	Tazio Nuvolari (4), Caberto Conelli (1), Giuseppe Campari (1), Luigi Fagioli (1), Achille Varzi (1),	5
3	United Kingdom	2	William Grover-Williams (1), Richard Seaman (1)	2
4	Monaco	1	Louis Chiron (1)	1

== Most wins per season ==
Key
**Bold**	Won the European Championship in the same year

Highest number of Grand Prix wins per season
Year	Driver(s)	Constructor(s)	Wins	Races	Percentage
1931	(Italy) Giuseppe Campari	Alfa Romeo, Bugatti	1	3	33.33%
1931	(Italy) Achille Varzi	Alfa Romeo, Bugatti	1	3	33.33%
1931	(Monaco) Louis Chiron	Alfa Romeo, Bugatti	1	3	33.33%
1931	(United Kingdom) William Grover-Williams	Alfa Romeo, Bugatti	1	3	33.33%
1931	(Italy) Caberto Conelli	Alfa Romeo, Bugatti	1	3	33.33%
1932	(Italy) **Tazio Nuvolari**	Alfa Romeo	2	3	66.67%
1935	(Germany) **Rudolf Caracciola**	Mercedes-Benz	4	7	57,14%
1936	(Germany) **Bernd Rosemeyer**	Auto Union	3	4	75,00%
1937	(Germany) **Rudolf Caracciola**	Mercedes-Benz	3	5	60,00%
1938	(Germany) **Rudolf Caracciola**	Mercedes-Benz, Auto Union	1	4	25,00%
1938	(Germany) Manfred von Brauchitsch	Mercedes-Benz, Auto Union	1	4	25,00%
1938	(United Kingdom) Richard Seaman	Mercedes-Benz, Auto Union	1	4	25,00%
1938	(Italy) Tazio Nuvolari	Mercedes-Benz, Auto Union	1	4	25,00%
1939	(Germany) Hermann Lang	Mercedes-Benz	2	4	50,00%

== See also ==
- AIACR European Championship
- Grand Prix motor racing
