= 1932 Grand Prix season =

Second year of the AIACR European Championship

1932 AIACR European Championship

Seasons
- ← 1931 1935 →

1932 Grand Prix season

Seasons
- ← 1931 1933 →

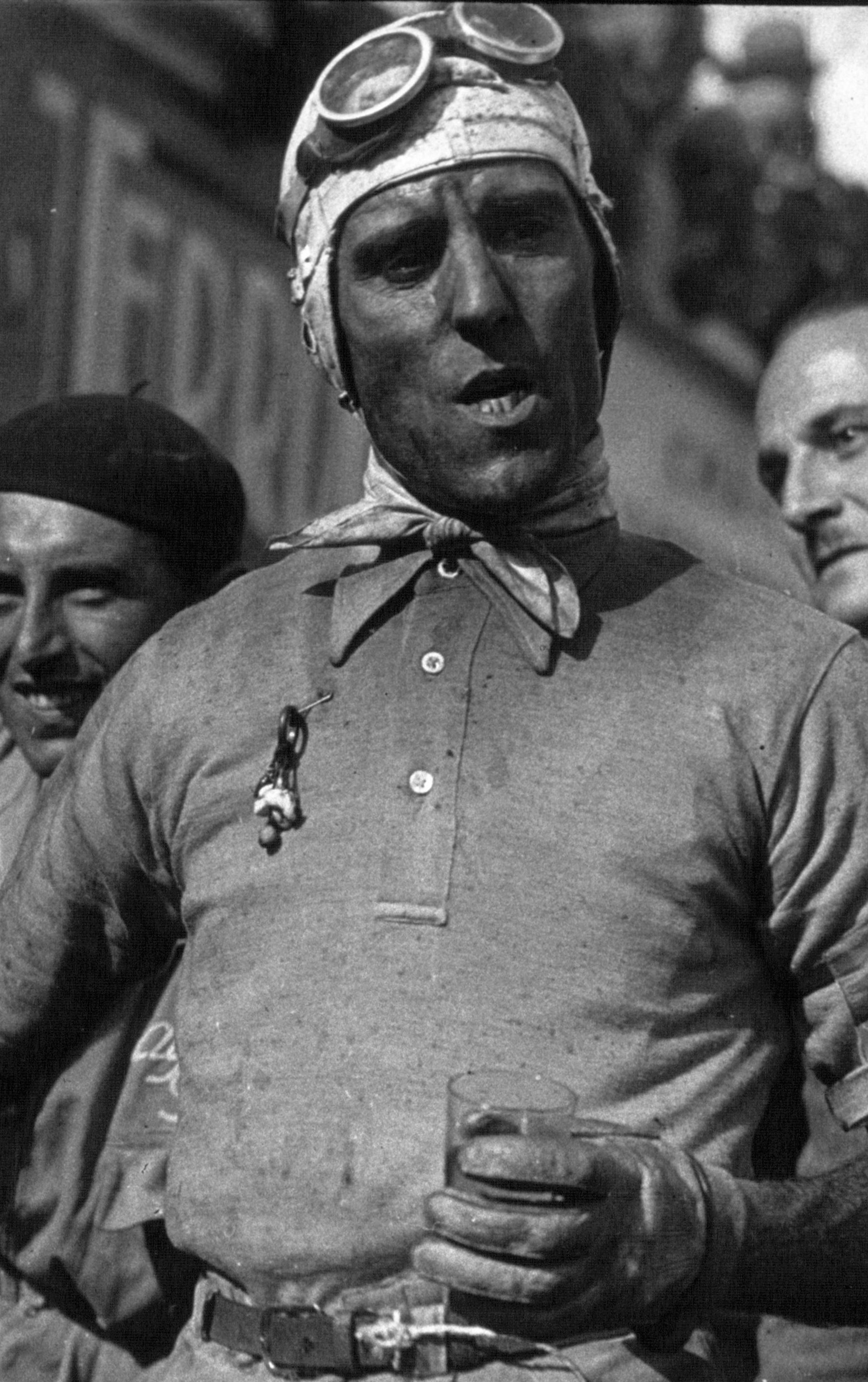
Tazio Nuvolari, 1932 European Champion

The 1932 Grand Prix season marked the second year of the AIACR European Championship. It saw the debut of Alfa Romeo's sensational new Tipo B (also called the P3) and with it, Tazio Nuvolari won the Championship driving for the Alfa Corse works team. The 40-year old Nuvolari won two of the three rounds and was second in the other. Still running to a Formula Libre (open formula) rules for the cars, the regulations were revised to set the races to be between five and ten hours. However, all three national committees ran their races to the minimum time-limit.

The other title contenders, Bugatti and Maserati continued to develop their models from the year before but they were rarely a match for the Alfa Romeo with its combination of high speed and light weight giving excellent balance for cornering. Nuvolari was dominant through the year, also winning the non-Championship Monaco GP and Targa Florio. His German team-mate Rudolf Caracciola won the other championship race, the German Grand Prix, along with the Eifelrennen and Monza GP. Bugatti did have some successes, with Achille Varzi winning the first major race of the year, at Tunis and Louis Chiron the Masaryk Circuit in Czechoslovakia.

Maserati had an unsuccessful season, which coincided with the death of their team manager and lead desginer, Alfieri Maserati, in March. His final design, the Maserati V5 bimotore, won the Rome Grand Prix driven by Luigi Fagioli. Privateer Manfred von Brauchitsch won the Avusrennen in a Mercedes-Benz featuring an aerodynamic bare-metal bodyshell. At the end of the season, Le Mans winner Raymond Sommer won at the Miramas oval near Marseille.

== European Championship Grands Prix ==
| | Date | Name | Circuit | Race Regulations | Weather | Race Distance | Winner's Time | Winning driver | Winning constructor | Fastest lap | Report |
|---|---|---|---|---|---|---|---|---|---|---|---|
| 1 | 5 Jun | (Italy) X Gran Premio d’Italia | Monza | AIACR | sunny | 838 km (winner) | 5 hours | (Italy) Tazio Nuvolari | Alfa Romeo P3 | Luigi Fagioli; Maserati | Report |
| 2 | 3 Jul | (France) XXVI Grand Prix de l’ACF | Reims-Gueux | AIACR | hot | 743 km (winner) | 5 hours | (Italy) Tazio Nuvolari | Alfa Romeo P3 | Tazio Nuvolari; Alfa Romeo | Report |
| 3 | 17 Jul | (Germany) VI Großer Preis von Deutschland | Nürburgring | AIACR; Voiturette | cold overcast | 570 km | 4h 47m | (Germany) Rudolf Caracciola | Alfa Romeo P3 | Tazio Nuvolari; Alfa Romeo | Report |

=== Other Grand Épreuves ===
| Date | Name | Circuit | Race Regulations | Weather | Race Distance | Winner's Time | Winning driver | Winning constructor | Fastest lap | Report |
|---|---|---|---|---|---|---|---|---|---|---|
| 30 May | (United States) XX International 500 Mile; Sweepstakes | Indianapolis | AAA | fine | 500 miles | 4h 48m | (United States) Fred Frame | Stevens-Miller-Hartz | not recorded | Report |
| 10 Jul | (Belgium) Belgian Grand Prix | Spa-Francorchamps | | | | | cancelled | | | |
| 25 Sep | (Spain) Spanish Grand Prix | Lasarte | | | | | cancelled | | | |

A grey background indicates the race was not held this year. Sources:

== Major Races ==
Multiple classes are mentioned when they were divided and run to different race lengths.

| | Date | Name | Circuit | Race Regulations | Weather | Race Distance | Winner's Time | Winning driver | Winning constructor | Report |
|---|---|---|---|---|---|---|---|---|---|---|
| | 29 Feb | (Sweden) II Sveriges Vinter Grand Prix | Lake Rämen | Formula Libre | sunny | 370 km | 4h 28m | (Sweden) Sven Olof “Olle” Bennström | Ford | Report |
| | 14 Mar | (Australia) V Australian Grand Prix | Phillip Island | Formula Libre handicap | sunny | 200 miles | 2h 40m | (Australia) Bill Thompson | Bugatti Type 37A | Report |
| | 27 Mar | (Spain) Gran Premio de Pasqua | Sitges-Terramar | Formula Libre, heats | hot | 30 km | 12mins | (Spain) Andrés de Vizcaya | Bugatti Type 39A | Report |
| | 27 Mar | (Italy) Circuito di Alessandria | Alessandria | | | | | cancelled | | |
| A | 3 Apr | (French protectorate of Tunisia) IV I Grand Prix de Tunisie | Carthage | Formula Libre | hot | 470 km | 3h 14m | (Italy) Achille Varzi | Bugatti Type 51 | Report |
| B | 17 Apr | IV Grand Prix de Monaco | Monte Carlo | Formula Libre | overcast | 320 km | 3h 32m | (Italy) Tazio Nuvolari | Alfa Romeo Monza | Report |
| C | 24 Apr | (Italy) VIII Premio Reale di Roma | Littorio | Formula Libre, heats | dry | 240 km | 1h 31m | (Italy) Luigi Fagioli | Maserati Tipo V5 | Report |
| | 24 Apr | (French Algeria) II Grand Prix d’Oranie | Arcole | Formula Libre | sunny | 380 km (winner) | 3 hours | (France) Jean-Pierre Wimille | Bugatti Type 51 | Report |
| | 30 Apr | (United Kingdom) I British Empire Trophy | Brooklands | Formula Libre, heats | ? | 100 miles | 47mins | (United Kingdom) John Cobb | Delage V12 LSR | Report |
| | 1 May | (Kingdom of Hungary) Hungarian Grand Prix | | | | | | cancelled | | |
| D | 8 May | (Italy) XXIII Targa Florio | Piccolo Madonie | Targa Florio | very hot | 580 km | 7h 16m | (Italy) Tazio Nuvolari | Alfa Romeo 8C 2300 | Report |
| | 8 May / 6 May | (Finland) I Suomen Suurajo (Finnish Grand Prix) | Eläintarharata | Formula Libre | overcast | 100 km | 1h 09m | (Sweden) Per-Viktor Widengren | Mercedes-Benz SSK | Report |
| | 15 May | (Belgium) VII Grand Prix des Frontières | Chimay | Formula Libre; Voiturette | sunny | 160 km | 1h 23m | (Belgium) Arthur Legat | Bugatti Type 37A | Report |
| | 16 May | (France) I Trophée de Provence | Nîmes | Formula Libre | sunny | 100 km | 47mins | (Poland) Count Stanisław Czaykowski (France) | Bugatti Type 35C | Report |
| | 16 May | (France) I Grand Prix de Nîmes | Nîmes | Formula Libre | sunny | 200 km | 1hr 33m | (France) Benoît Falchetto | Bugatti Type 51 | Report |
| E | 22 May | (Germany) II Internationales Avusrennen | AVUS | Formula Libre; Voiturette | cool | 300 km | 1h 31m | (Germany) Manfred von Brauchitsch | Mercedes-Benz SSKL streamliner | Report |
| F | 22 May | (French protectorate in Morocco) II Casablanca Grand Prix; VI Moroccan Grand Prix | Anfa Circuit | Formula Libre | sunny | 420 km | 3h 19m | (French Algeria) Marcel Lehoux | Type 54 | Report |
| G | 29 May | (Germany) VI Eifelrennen | Nürburgring | Formula Libre | sunny, then brief shower | 320 km | 2h 48m | (Germany) Rudolf Caracciola | Alfa Romeo Monza | Report |
| | 29 May | (France) Circuit de Torvilliers | Torvilliers, Troyes | Formula Libre | ? | 268 km (winner) | 2 hours | (France) ? Robert Gauthier | Bugatti Type 35B | Report |
| | 29 May | (Italy) Circuito di Mugello | | | | | | cancelled | | |
| | 5 Jun | (France) VIII Grand Prix de Picardie | Péronne | Formula Libre; Voiturette | cloudy | 240 km | 1h 56m | (France) Philippe Étancelin | Alfa Romeo Monza | Report |
| | 19 Jun | (Poland) III Grand Prix Miasta Lwowa (Großer Preis von Lemberg) | Lviv | Formula Libre | sunny | 200 km | 2h 20m | (Germany) Rudolf Caracciola | Alfa Romeo Monza | Report |
| | 26 Jun | (France) I Grand Prix de Lorraine | Seichamps, Nancy | Formula Libre; Voiturette | damp | 165 km | 1h 29m | (France) Jean-Pierre Wimille | Alfa Romeo Monza | Report |
| | 24 Jul | (France) IV Grand Prix de Dieppe | Dieppe | Formula Libre; Voiturette | rain | 502 km (winner) | 4 hours | (Monaco) Louis Chiron | Bugatti Type 51 | Report |
| H | 31 Jul | (Italy) VI Coppa Ciano | Montenero | Formula Libre; Voiturette | hot | 200 km | 2h 18m | (Italy) Tazio Nuvolari | Alfa Romeo P3 | Report |
| | 31 Jul | (France) Circuit de Vitesse de Nice | Nice | Formula Libre, heats | ? | 50 km | 30mins | (Monaco) Louis Chiron | Bugatti Type 51 | Report |
| J | 14 Aug | (Italy) VIII Coppa Acerbo | Pescara | Formula Libre; Voiturette | hot | 300 km | 2h 11m | (Italy) Tazio Nuvolari | Alfa Romeo P3 | Report |
| | 14 Aug | (France) VIII Grand Prix du Comminges | Saint-Gaudens | Formula Libre; Voiturette | fine, then rain at end | 420 km | 3h 02m | (Italy) Goffredo Zehender | Alfa Romeo Monza | Report |
| | 17 Aug | (France) VIII Grand Prix de la Baule | La Baule beach | Formula Libre | sunny | 150 km | 1h 02m | (United Kingdom) William Grover-Williams | Bugatti Type 51 | Report |
| K | 4 Sep | (Czechoslovakia) III Masaryk Circuit | Masaryk-Ring, Brno | Formula Libre; Voiturette | rain | 500 km | 4h 37m | (Monaco) Louis Chiron | Bugatti Type 51 | Report |
| L | 11 Sep | (Italy) V Gran Premio di Monza | Monza | Formula Libre, heats | sunny | 200 km | 1h 07m | (Germany) Rudolf Caracciola | Alfa Romeo P3 | Report |
| | 11 Sep | (France) III Circuit du Cap d’Antibes | La Garoupe | Formula Libre; Voiturette | ? | 100 km | 1h 13m | (France) Benoît Falchetto | Bugatti Type 51 (Bugatti Type 35B) | Report |
| M | 25 Sep | (France) I Grand Prix de Marseille | Miramas | Formula Libre | hot | 400 km | 2h 18m | (France) Raymond Sommer | Alfa Romeo Monza | Report |
| | 25 Sep | (Finland) I Munksnäsloppet / Munkkiniemenajo | Munkkiniemenrata, Helsinki | Formula Libre | sunny | 150 km | 1h 42m | (Sweden) Per-Viktor Widengren | Alfa Romeo Monza | Report |
| | 9 Oct | (France) Grand Prix de l’UMF | Montlhéry | Voiturette | | 100 km | 41m | (France) Dr Pierre Félix | Alfa Romeo | Report |

== Regulations and Technical ==
In September 1931, at the conclusion of the inaugural European Championship, the CSI regulatory body of the AIACR met and agreed to hold the event again in 1932. The German Grand Prix was added to the list of races in the schedule. But with the cancellation of the Belgian and Spanish rounds, there would be, once again, only the three races to contest. After the 10-hour marathons of the previous year, the CSI accepted to shorten the run-time to be between 5 – 10hours. All national organisations chose the minimum time, although the German organisers embarrassingly miscalculated, making the race technically ineligible to be included. However, no teams protested the error. There was also a re-introduction of the Manufacturer's Championship, last held in 1927. Curiously, the AIACR never published its list of regulations, and information has only been able to be compiled by inference and comment from contemporary racing magazines. There were, apparently, no changes to the cars or engines from the current regulations.

From those magazine reports, there appears to have been a change in the points system, with 7 points for a non-start or non-arrival, and 6 points awarded to all retirees when it had formerly been 8 for not arriving and 5, 6 or 7 for retiring depending on the distance covered.

Once again, the AIACR was becoming concerned with the high speeds of the big-engined racing cars. The current regulations were due to expire at the end of 1933. During the year, experts including Ferdinand Porsche, were commissioned by the AIACR to start working on the new regulations to come into effect for the 1934 season. The rules revolved around a maximum weight of 750kg and a minimum width, to incentivise the building of smaller, and hence lighter, engines. It in fact resembled proposed AIACR rules dating back to 1928.

=== Technical Innovation ===
In Italy, the year saw the opening of the country's first autostrada, between Milan and Turin. Alfa Romeo's lead designer, Vittorio Jano, had seen the 1931 Tipo A as an interim model and in 1932 he produced what many consider his masterpiece – the Tipo B. It is also commonly known as the ‘P3’, as it was seen as a worthy successor to Alfa's dominant P2 model of the mid-20s. With limited funds available to him, the engine was based on the race-proven winner in the 8C 2300, with a longer stroke and bored out to 2654cc, churning out a total of 215 bhp. It was fitted with two superchargers, one for each bank of four cylinders. Aluminium blocks kept the engine very light, and the whole vehicle was designed with weight in mind. A new suspension format, with the differential mounted behind the gearbox driving the rear suspension through twin driveshafts. This improved the weight distribution, giving better handling, and allowed the driver to sit lower between the driveshafts. Although putting out less power than its competition, its big advantage was its weight – with an aluminium engine block it only weighed 700kg, over 25% less than the big Bugatti and Maserati. Like the Type A, it was a monoposto (single-seater) design, with a narrow frontage, echoing the American Millers of the 1920s. Six cars were built with three sets of spare parts. Unveiled for the championship at its home Grand Prix, six models were made and it won on debut. Over the next 2½ years, the car would take part in 26 races, winning 22, while achieving a 92% finish-ratio from the 62 race-starts. The Alfa Corse works team was also managed by the talented Aldo Giovannini, who placated the strong egos of his drivers and kept his pit crews well-drilled and organised.

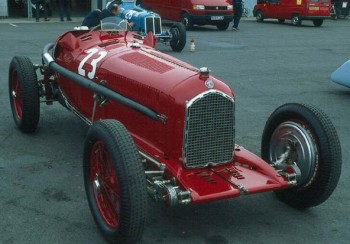
Alfa Romeo P3

In 1927 Alfieri Maserati had a serious accident racing in Sicily that resulted in him losing a kidney. Issues with his remaining kidney necessitated an operation in March. However, complications occurred and he died during the procedure; he was just 44. The surviving brothers resolved to carry on. The eldest, Bindo, returned from Isotta Fraschini to become president; Ettore stayed on in operations, while the youngest, Ernesto retired from racing to take on the technical side. Several projects were already well underway at Alfieri's death: the successor to the twin-engine V4 was the new Type V5. The engines were bored out to a total capacity now of 4905cc. Although very fast, it proved overly complex and unreliable to get regular race results. A hard year ended badly when works driver Amedeo Ruggieri crashed fatally while driving a V5 trying to make a one-hour speed record attempt at Montlhéry. The two works 8C-2800 grand prix cars were upgraded by being fitted with new 3-litre engines.

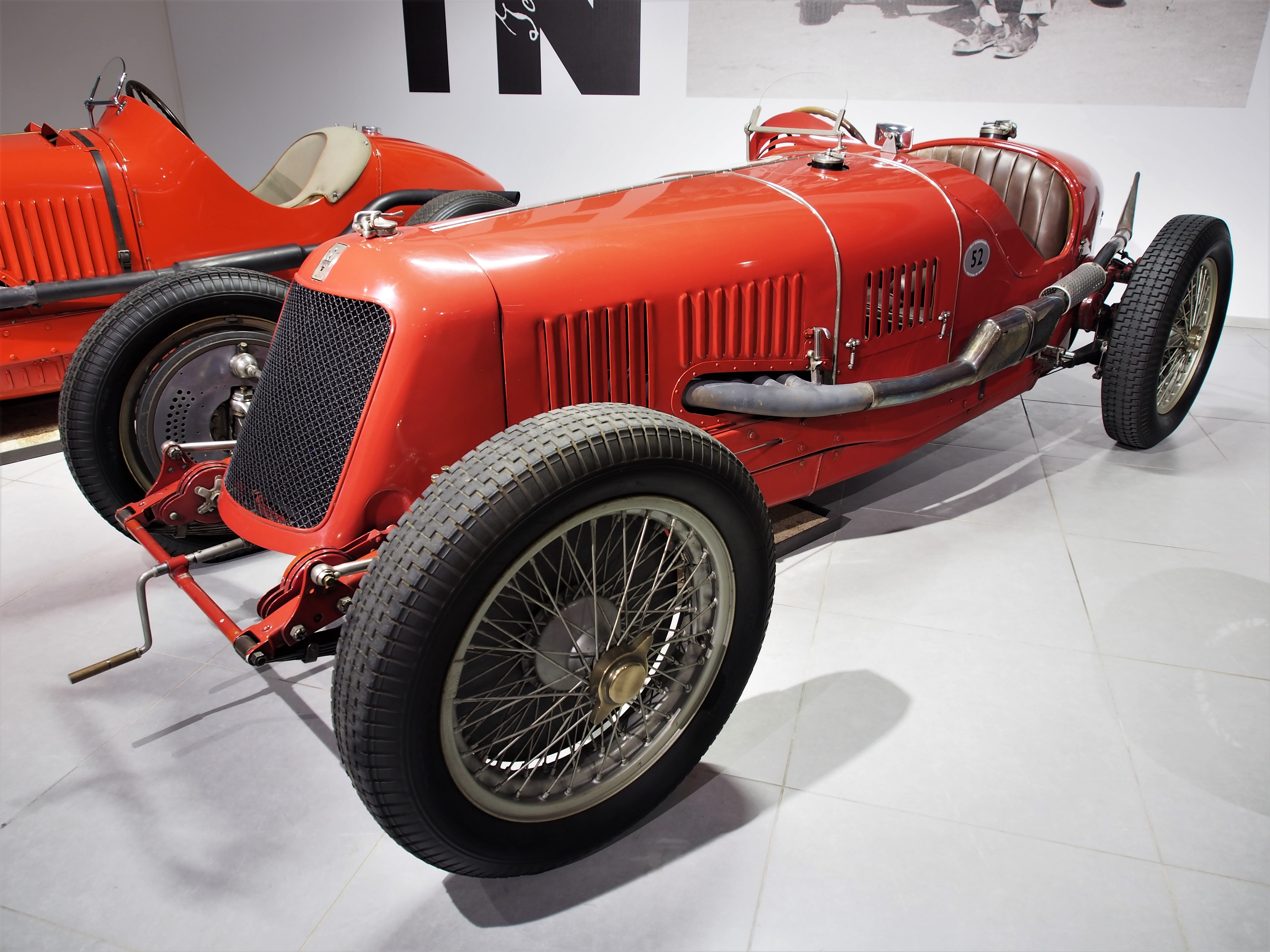
Maserati 8C 3000

Bugatti’s Type 51 had been instantly competitive on debut the previous year. Although on the high-speed circuits, the Alfa Romeo Monzas had their measure, in twisty circuits the Bugatti's good handling shone through. So Ettore Bugatti chose to sit on his laurels and not do any significant development on his car. In August, he was honoured by France being awarded the Légion d’Honneur. The Type 54 was proving problematic in competition and a new version, the Type 53, was built. Using the 5-litre engine of the 54 it was built with four-wheel drive, possibly influenced by, and hoping to emulate, the success of the American Miller 91 FWD. The other French manufacturers chose instead to focus on attaining speed and endurance records. In April, George Eyston drove an 8-litre sleeve-valve Panhard at Montlhéry, setting a new 1-hour speed record, averaging 212.45 kph. This followed a little 1452cc Citroën C6 setting a raft of endurance records at the same circuit, running non-stop for 54 days, covering 130,000km.

There were also several Italian drivers who developed their own special models. Wealthy gentleman-driver Conte Luigi Premoli worked with engineer Egidio Galimberti to put a 3-litre Maserati engine and grill onto the chassis, gearbox and suspension of the Type 35 Bugatti. The engine's power output of 220 horsepower compared favourably to the 180 bhp of the Bugatti, while keeping the size and nimbleness of the latter. Hence called the PBM (“Premoli Bugatti Maserati”) Speziale, Premoli unfortunately had a serious accident in it on its debut race at the Coppa Ciano and it was not raced again until the following year. In a similar vein, Clemente Biondetti mounted the 2.5-litre Maserati engine from a Tipo 26M onto a Bugatti chassis. On paper, this version put out 185 bhp, and Biondetti ran it in a number of races over the new few seasons, in the Italian Drivers' Championship.

The economic crisis in Germany was still severe. After a couple of years of leniency from the board, Mercedes-Benz now fully withdrew from motor-racing, releasing top driver Rudolf Caracciola to be picked up by Alfa Romeo much to the dismay of German fans. Meanwhile, many small and medium size car-companies were going bankrupt, unable to compete against the American mass-production lines of Ford and Opel (sold to General Motors). It was only with the intervention of the Saxony state government that their local factories were rescued saving 8000 jobs. Thus it was that the four Saxon companies of Audi, DKW, Horch and Wanderer merged to become Auto Union AG. Former Austro-Daimler and Mercedes Technical Director Dr Ferdinand Porsche joined the new company as their lead engineer. In a year of political upheaval in Germany, the company directors of Mercedes-Benz and Auto Union had no joy petitioning the government for funds. In the end, it was the lead drivers, Stuck and von Brauchitsch (nephew of the commander of the army) making personal appeals (on behalf of Auto Union and Mercedes-Benz respectively) to minority party leader Adolf Hitler that got success. A strong fan of the automobile, Hitler promised both companies subsidies when his party came into power.

| Manufacturer | Model | Engine | Power Output | Max. Speed (km/h) | Dry Weight (kg) |
|---|---|---|---|---|---|
| (Italy) Alfa Romeo | Alfa Romeo Tipo B | Alfa Romeo 2.65L S8 twin-supercharged | 215 bhp | 230 | 700 |
| (Italy) Alfa Romeo | 8C-2300 “Monza” | Alfa Romeo 2.3L S8 supercharged | 180 bhp | 210 | 920 |
| (France) Bugatti | Type 51 | Bugatti 2.3L S8 supercharged | 180 bhp | 230 | 750 |
| (France) Bugatti | Type 54 | Bugatti 5.0L S8 supercharged | 300 bhp | 240 | 930 |
| (Italy) Maserati | 8C-2800 | Maserati 2.8L S8 supercharged | 205 bhp | 225 | 820 |
| (Italy) Maserati | Tipo V5 | Maserati 4.9L twin-8 supercharged | 330 bhp | 250 | 1050 |
| (Germany) Mercedes-Benz | SSKL | Mercedes-Benz 7.1L S6 part-supercharged | 310 bhp | 230 | 1400 |
| (France) Bugatti | Type 51A | Bugatti 1492cc S8 supercharged | 135 bhp | 200 | 750 |
| (Italy) Maserati | 4CM | Maserati 1.1L S4 | | | |

== Teams and drivers ==
These tables only intend to cover entries in the major races, using the key above. It includes all starters in the Championship races. Sources:

| Entrant | Constructor | Chassis | Engine | Tyre | Driver | Rounds |
|---|---|---|---|---|---|---|
| (France) Automobiles Ettore Bugatti | Bugatti | Type 51; Type 54 | Bugatti 2.3L S8 s/c Bugatti 5.0L 2x8 s/c | ? | (Italy) Achille Varzi | 1, 2, [3]; A♠, B, C♠, D, [E], [F], H♠, J, K, L, M♠ |
| (France) Automobiles Ettore Bugatti | Bugatti | Type 51; Type 54 | Bugatti 2.3L S8 s/c Bugatti 5.0L 2x8 s/c | ? | (Monaco) Louis Chiron | 1, 2, 3; A♠, B♠, D, [E], [F], G, J, K, L, M♠ |
| (France) Automobiles Ettore Bugatti | Bugatti | Type 51; Type 54 | Bugatti 2.3L S8 s/c Bugatti 5.0L 2x8 s/c | ? | (France) Albert Divo | 1, 2, [3]; B, E, K |
| (France) Automobiles Ettore Bugatti | Bugatti | Type 51; Type 54 | Bugatti 2.3L S8 s/c Bugatti 5.0L 2x8 s/c | ? | (France) Guy Bouriat | 1*, [3]; B, E, K, [L♠], [M♠] |
| (Italy) Alfa Corse | Alfa Romeo | Tipo B 8C-2300 | Alfa Romeo 2.7L S8 s/c Alfa Romeo 2.3L S8 s/c | ? / C | (Italy) Tazio Nuvolari | 1, 2, 3; B, [E], H, L, M |
| (Italy) Alfa Corse | Alfa Romeo | Tipo B 8C-2300 | Alfa Romeo 2.7L S8 s/c Alfa Romeo 2.3L S8 s/c | ? / C | (Italy) Baconin Borzacchini | 1, 2, 3; B, H, J, L |
| (Italy) Alfa Corse | Alfa Romeo | Tipo B 8C-2300 | Alfa Romeo 2.7L S8 s/c Alfa Romeo 2.3L S8 s/c | ? / C | (Germany) Rudolf Caracciola | 1, 2, 3; B♠, E♠, G♠, J, L |
| (Italy) Alfa Corse | Alfa Romeo | Tipo B 8C-2300 | Alfa Romeo 2.7L S8 s/c Alfa Romeo 2.3L S8 s/c | ? / C | (Italy) Giuseppe Campari | 1, 2*, [3]; B, H, [J], L |
| (Italy) Alfa Corse | Alfa Romeo | Tipo B 8C-2300 | Alfa Romeo 2.7L S8 s/c Alfa Romeo 2.3L S8 s/c | ? / C | (Italy) Attilio Marinoni | 1* |
| (Italy) Officine Alfieri Maserati SpA | Maserati | Tipo V5; 8C-3000; 8C-2800; Tipo 26M; Tipo 4CM | Maserati 4.9L 2x8 twin s/c Maserati 3.0L S8 s/c Maserati 2.8L S8 s/c Maserati 2.5L S8 s/c Maserati 1.1L S4 | ? | (Italy) Ernesto Maserati | 1*, 3v; [D], [E], J*, Kv, L* |
| (Italy) Officine Alfieri Maserati SpA | Maserati | Tipo V5; 8C-3000; 8C-2800; Tipo 26M; Tipo 4CM | Maserati 4.9L 2x8 twin s/c Maserati 3.0L S8 s/c Maserati 2.8L S8 s/c Maserati 2.5L S8 s/c Maserati 1.1L S4 | ? | (Italy) Luigi Fagioli | 1; A, B, C, D, E, J, K, L, M |
| (Italy) Officine Alfieri Maserati SpA | Maserati | Tipo V5; 8C-3000; 8C-2800; Tipo 26M; Tipo 4CM | Maserati 4.9L 2x8 twin s/c Maserati 3.0L S8 s/c Maserati 2.8L S8 s/c Maserati 2.5L S8 s/c Maserati 1.1L S4 | ? | (Italy) Amedeo Ruggeri | 1, 3; 3v*; B, [C], D, J, L, M, † |
| (Italy) Officine Alfieri Maserati SpA | Maserati | Tipo V5; 8C-3000; 8C-2800; Tipo 26M; Tipo 4CM | Maserati 4.9L 2x8 twin s/c Maserati 3.0L S8 s/c Maserati 2.8L S8 s/c Maserati 2.5L S8 s/c Maserati 1.1L S4 | ? | (France) René Dreyfus | A, B, C, E, G♠, [K] |
| (Italy) Officine Alfieri Maserati SpA | Maserati | Tipo V5; 8C-3000; 8C-2800; Tipo 26M; Tipo 4CM | Maserati 4.9L 2x8 twin s/c Maserati 3.0L S8 s/c Maserati 2.8L S8 s/c Maserati 2.5L S8 s/c Maserati 1.1L S4 | ? | (Italy) Giovanni Minozzi | C♠, L |
| (Italy) Scuderia Ferrari | Alfa Romeo | 8C-2300; 6C-1750 GS | Alfa Romeo 2.3L S8 s/c Alfa Romeo 1.75L S6 s/c | ? | (Italy) Eugenio Siena | 1; A, [K] |
| (Italy) Scuderia Ferrari | Alfa Romeo | 8C-2300; 6C-1750 GS | Alfa Romeo 2.3L S8 s/c Alfa Romeo 1.75L S6 s/c | ? | (Italy) Pietro Ghersi | 1; D, H, J |
| (Italy) Scuderia Ferrari | Alfa Romeo | 8C-2300; 6C-1750 GS | Alfa Romeo 2.3L S8 s/c Alfa Romeo 1.75L S6 s/c | ? | (Italy) Marchese Antonio Brivio | 1*; D, H, J, K, L |
| (Italy) Scuderia Ferrari | Alfa Romeo | 8C-2300; 6C-1750 GS | Alfa Romeo 2.3L S8 s/c Alfa Romeo 1.75L S6 s/c | ? | (Italy) Piero Taruffi | C, H, J, L |
| (Italy) Scuderia Ferrari | Alfa Romeo | 8C-2300; 6C-1750 GS | Alfa Romeo 2.3L S8 s/c Alfa Romeo 1.75L S6 s/c | ? | (Italy) Franco Comotti | C |
| (Italy) Scuderia Ferrari | Alfa Romeo | 8C-2300; 6C-1750 GS | Alfa Romeo 2.3L S8 s/c Alfa Romeo 1.75L S6 s/c | ? | (Italy) Tazio Nuvolari | D, J, K |
| (Italy) Scuderia Ferrari | Alfa Romeo | 8C-2300; 6C-1750 GS | Alfa Romeo 2.3L S8 s/c Alfa Romeo 1.75L S6 s/c | ? | (Italy) Baconin Borzacchini | D, K |
| (Italy) Scuderia Ferrari | Alfa Romeo | 8C-2300; 6C-1750 GS | Alfa Romeo 2.3L S8 s/c Alfa Romeo 1.75L S6 s/c | ? | (Italy) Marquis Guido d'Ippolito | D, H |
| (Germany) Deutsches Bugatti Team | Bugatti | Type 54; Type 51; Type 35C; Type 51A | Bugatti 5.0L S8 s/c Bugatti 2.3L S8 s/c Bugatti 2.0L S8 s/c Bugatti 1.5L S4 s/c | | (Germany) Heinrich-Joachim von Morgen | A, C, E, G† |
| (Germany) Deutsches Bugatti Team | Bugatti | Type 54; Type 51; Type 35C; Type 51A | Bugatti 5.0L S8 s/c Bugatti 2.3L S8 s/c Bugatti 2.0L S8 s/c Bugatti 1.5L S4 s/c | | (Germany) Hermann, Prinz zu Leiningen | E, G |
| (Germany) Deutsches Bugatti Team | Bugatti | Type 54; Type 51; Type 35C; Type 51A | Bugatti 5.0L S8 s/c Bugatti 2.3L S8 s/c Bugatti 2.0L S8 s/c Bugatti 1.5L S4 s/c | | (Germany) Ernst-Günther Burggaller | 3v; [G], Kv♠ |
| (Germany) PiLeSi Rennteam | Bugatti DKW | Type 35B; Type 51; Type 37A; 520 | Bugatti 2.3L S8 s/c Bugatti 2.3L S8 s/c Bugatti 1.5L S4 s/c DKW 520cc S2 2-stroke | | (Germany) Paul Pietsch | 3 |
| (Germany) PiLeSi Rennteam | Bugatti DKW | Type 35B; Type 51; Type 37A; 520 | Bugatti 2.3L S8 s/c Bugatti 2.3L S8 s/c Bugatti 1.5L S4 s/c DKW 520cc S2 2-stroke | | (Germany) Hans Lewy | 3; E, [G] |
| (Germany) PiLeSi Rennteam | Bugatti DKW | Type 35B; Type 51; Type 37A; 520 | Bugatti 2.3L S8 s/c Bugatti 2.3L S8 s/c Bugatti 1.5L S4 s/c DKW 520cc S2 2-stroke | | (Germany) Hans Simons | 3v; Ev♠, Gv, Kv |

=== Notable Privateer drivers ===
| Entrant | Constructor | Chassis | Engine | Driver | Rounds |
|---|---|---|---|---|---|
| Private Entrant | Bugatti | Type 54; Type 51 | Bugatti 5.0L S8 s/c Bugatti 2.3L S8 s/c | (French Algeria) Marcel Lehoux | 1, 2, 3; A, B, F, K, L, M |
| Private Entrant | Bugatti | Type 51 | Bugatti 2.3L S8 s/c | (France) René Dreyfus | 1, 2, 3; G, M |
| Private Entrant | Bugatti Bugatti Bugatti Alfa Romeo | Type 54; Type 51; Type 37; 8C-2300 | Bugatti 5.0L S8 s/c Bugatti 2.3L S8 s/c Bugatti 1.5L S4 s/c Alfa Romeo 2.3L S8 s/c | (France) Jean-Pierre Wimille | [1], 2; A, F, [M] |
| Private Entrant | Maserati Bugatti | Type 26M; Type 39A | Maserati 2.5L S8; Bugatti 1.5L S4 | (Italy) Conte Luigi Castelbarco | 1; A, C, H |
| Private Entrant | Bugatti | MB Spéciale | Maserati 2.5L S8 s/c | (Italy) Clemente Biondetti | [1]; A, C, D, H, J, L |
| Private Entrant | Maserati Bugatti | Tipo 26M; BMP Speziale | Maserati 2.5L S8 s/c Maserati 3.0L S8 s/c | (Italy) Conte Luigi Premoli | 1; H |
| Private Entrant | Mercedes-Benz | SSKL | Mercedes-Benz 7.1L S6 s/c | (Germany) Hans Stuck | [1], [3]; E, G |
| Private Entrant | Bugatti Bugatti Delage | Type 54; Type 51; 15 S8 | Bugatti 5.0L S8 s/c Bugatti 2.3L S8 s/c Delage 1.5L S8 s/c | (United Kingdom) Earl Howe | 2, 3v; B, Ev, J, L |
| Private Entrant | Bugatti MG | Type 54; Midget Type C | Bugatti 5.0L S8 s/c MG 750cc S4 | (United Kingdom) Hugh Hamilton | 2*, 3v |
| Private Entrant | Alfa Romeo | 8C 2300 | Alfa Romeo 2.3L S8 s/c | (France) Philippe Étancelin | 2; A, B, F |
| Private Entrant | Bugatti | Type 51 | Bugatti 2.3L S8 s/c | (France) Jean Gaupillat | 2; [A], F, M |
| Private Entrant | Alfa Romeo | 8C 2300 | Alfa Romeo 2.3L S8 s/c | (Italy) Conte Goffredo Zehender | 2; B, [C], F, M |
| Private Entrant | Bugatti | Type 51 | Bugatti 2.3L S8 s/c | (United Kingdom) William Grover-Williams | 2; B, E |
| Private Entrant | Alfa Romeo FG Lombard | 8C 2300; Spéciale | Alfa Romeo 2.3L S8 s/c Lombard 1.1L S4 | (France) Dr Pierre Félix | 2, 3v; F, L, M |
| Private Entrant | Alfa Romeo FG Lombard | 8C 2300; Spéciale | Alfa Romeo 2.3L S8 s/c Lombard 1.1L S4 | (France) Jean Pesato | 2* |
| Private Entrant | Bugatti | Type 51; Type 35B | Bugatti 2.3L S8 s/c | (France) Benoît Falchetto | [2]; F, M |
| Private Entrant | Bugatti | Type 35C; Type 51 | Bugatti 2.0L S8 s/c Bugatti 2.3L S8 s/c | (France) Max Fourny | 2; [M] |
| Private Entrant | Alfa Romeo | 8C 2300 | Alfa Romeo 2.3L S8 s/c | (France) Raymond Sommer | [2]; M |
| Private Entrant | Bugatti | Type 37A | Bugatti 1.5L S4 s/c | (France) Anne-Cécile Rose-Itier | 3v; A, C, F, J, Kv |
| Private Entrant | Amilcar | MCO | Amilcar 1.1L S6 s/c | (France) José Scaron | 3v; A, [C], F |
| Private Entrant | Bugatti Bugatti | Type 37A; Type 35B | Bugatti 1.5L S4 s/c Bugatti 2.3L S8 s/c | (Kingdom of Hungary) László Hartmann | 3v; E, G, Kv |
| Private Entrant | DKW | Stromlinienwagon | DKW 780cc S2 2-stroke | (Germany) Gerhard Macher | 3v; Ev, Gv, Kv |
| Private Entrant | Alfa Romeo | 6C 1500 | Alfa Romeo 1.5L S6 s/c | (Switzerland) Henri Täumer | 3v; Ev, G |
| Private Entrant | Bugatti | Type 51 | Bugatti 2.3L S8 s/c | (Poland) Count Stanisław Czaykowski (France) | A, B, C, F |
| Private Entrant | Maserati | Tipo 26M | Maserati 2.5L S8 s/c | (France) Jean de Maleplane | A, F, L, M |
| Private Entrant | Maserati | Tipo 26 | Maserati 1.5L S8 s/c | (France) Pierre Veyron | A, F, Kv |
| Private Entrant | Mercedes-Benz | SSKL | Mercedes-Benz 7.1L S6 s/c | (Germany) Manfred von Brauchitsch | E, G, J, [K], [L] |
| Private Entrant | Bugatti | Type 35C | Bugatti 2.0L S8 s/c | (French Algeria) Guy Moll | F, M |

Note: * indicates only raced in the event as a relief driver,
“♠“ Works driver raced as a privateer in that race,
“v” indicates the driver ran in the Voiturette class,
“†” driver killed during this racing season,
Those in brackets show that, although entered, the driver did not race

== Season review ==
=== The opening races ===
As with the previous year, the season started with the first Swedish Winter Grand Prix. After a successful inaugural race, entries from Ford, Chrysler, Chevrolet and Fiat were fielded by their Swedish agents. Last year’s winner, Finn Karl Ebb bought a Mercedes SSK, as did Per-Victor Widengren. His brother Henken, studying in England, bought over an Aston Martin as well as convincing his American friend Whitney Straight to enter with his Maserati 26M. An earlier-than-usual thaw made the forest roads treacherous and very muddy.

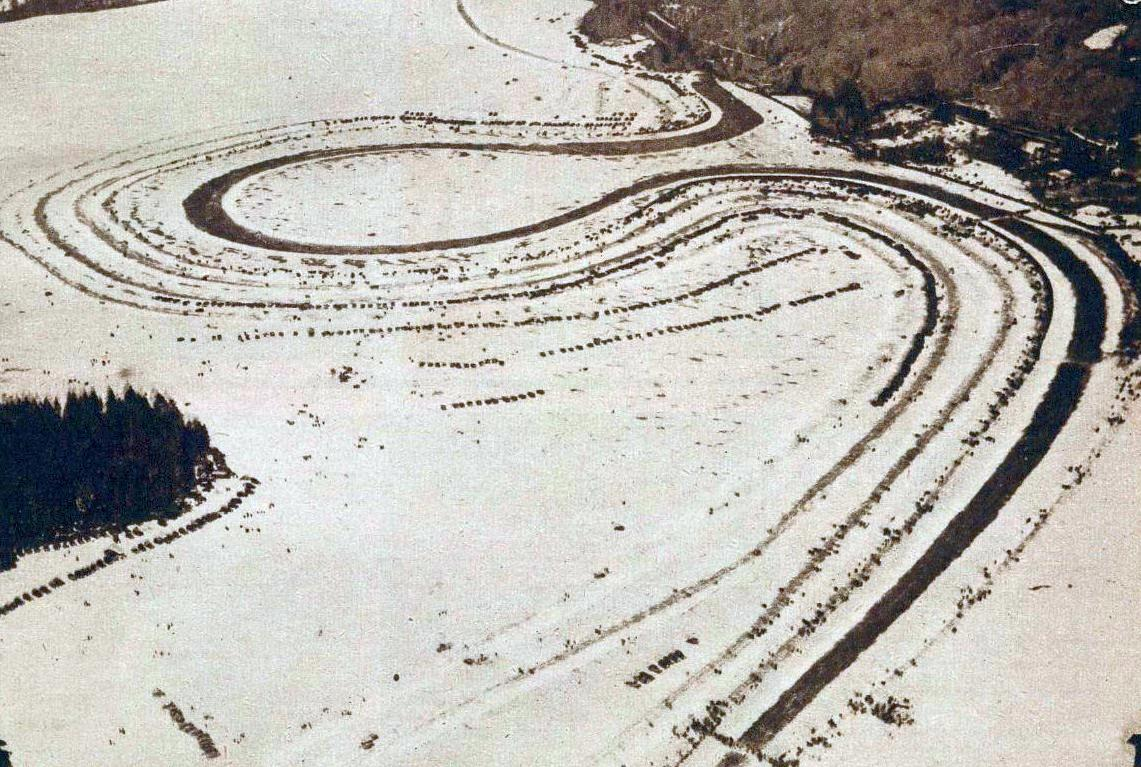
Aerial view over Lake Rämen

From the start, Knut-Gustav Sundstedt took a commanding lead, as he had fitted studded tyres to his Bugatti T35B. Next was Henrik Widengren, Keinänen in a works Chrysler, Lindberg (Bugatti T43), Ebb and Straight. But Sundstedt, in his haste, soon slid off the road and wrecked his back wheel. On the second lap, Straight tried passing Ebb on the short track across the frozen lake. But the Mercedes would not give ground and Straight was sent skating across the ice with damaged steering. Halfway round the next lap, Ebb tried overtaking Keinänen but himself ended up off the course and in a field. Cracking the fuel tank, he soon ended up out of fuel. Windscreens and drivers were getting peppered by gravel thrown up off the rough track. Keinänen stopped to change tyres and by halfway, on the fourth lap, locals Erik Bake (Buick) and Olle Bennström (Ford) were in front. Unlike the race-cars, the big American tourers did not need to stop to refuel. Despite the smaller cars rapidly moving back up the field, the amateur Bennström held on to win the race with Keinänen getting second from Bake and P-V Widengren's Mercedes in fourth. Later, in recognition, Ford awarded Bennström a dealership in his home town of Västerås.

Six weeks later, the international season got underway at the Tunis Grand Prix. The organisers had rebuilt the grandstand and pits after a hurricane had destroyed them in December. Growing in stature, the race attracted a very strong field. Bugatti team drivers Achille Varzi and Louis Chiron ran their own Type 51s, as did Polish émigré Count Stanisław Czaykowski. This year, Algerian Marcel Lehoux, German Heinrich-Joachim von Morgen and Jean-Pierre Wimille ran the big 5-litre Type 54. The Maserati works team had two of their 8C-2800 cars for regular drivers Luigi Fagioli and René Dreyfus. Alfa Romeo was represented by Scuderia Ferrari with a Monza for their new driver Eugenio Siena and Philippe Étancelin also bought his Monza. Alongside the main class, a field of nine "voiturettes" was lined up. Against a squadron of Bugattis were José Scaron, in his 1.1-litre supercharged Amilcar, and Bugatti test-driver Pierre Veyron surprisingly in a Maserati. At the start, Varzi surged from the third row into the lead. On the long straights Lehoux could wind up the big Bugatti and overtake Varzi, yet the nimbler Type 51 could outbreak and out-turn Lehoux. This continued for several laps until Chiron moved up to second, but when he lost time pitting with ignition problems, Fagioli inherited second. His Maserati closed on Varzi until half-distance when Fagioli's supercharger gave up. Thereafter, Varzi had a clear run to the flag with Lehoux and Étancelin over three minutes behind. All three Type 54s had shown serious brake problems with the bigger, heavy car only fitted with the same brakes as were on the Type 51.

=== Monaco and the April races ===
A fortnight later, the teams met for the first major race in Europe – the Monaco Grand Prix. There was great anticipation for this race because the Alfa Romeo works team was entered, taking on the Bugatti and Maserati teams, along with an elite invitation list of the top privateer drivers, and there was no clear favourite. Bugatti returned with Varzi and Chiron supported by Guy Bouriat and Albert Divo. The team also brought one of their new Type 53 four-wheel drive cars. Maserati, still affected by the recent sudden death of their leader, had the 8C-2800 for Fagioli and Dreyfus, while Amedeo Ruggeri ran a 2.5 litre Tipo 26M. The Alfa Romeo team comprised team regulars Tazio Nuvolari, Baconin Borzacchini and the evergreen Giuseppe Campari along with support from privateers Étancelin, Zehender and Rudolf Caracciola now released from the defunct Mercedes team. Caracciola had narrowly missed out winning the Mille Miglia for Alfa Romeo the weekend before when his engine expired just 50km from the finish while leading. Victory had gone to Borzacchini in a similar car. Bugatti also had a strong back-up of Type 51s entered by inaugural race-winner ”Williams”, Czaykowski, Lehoux and Earl Howe. Another Englishman, Clifton Penn-Hughes had an older Type 35B while Chilean Juan Zanelli had a 3-litre Spanish Nacional Pescara with which he had won the 1931 Mountain Championship.

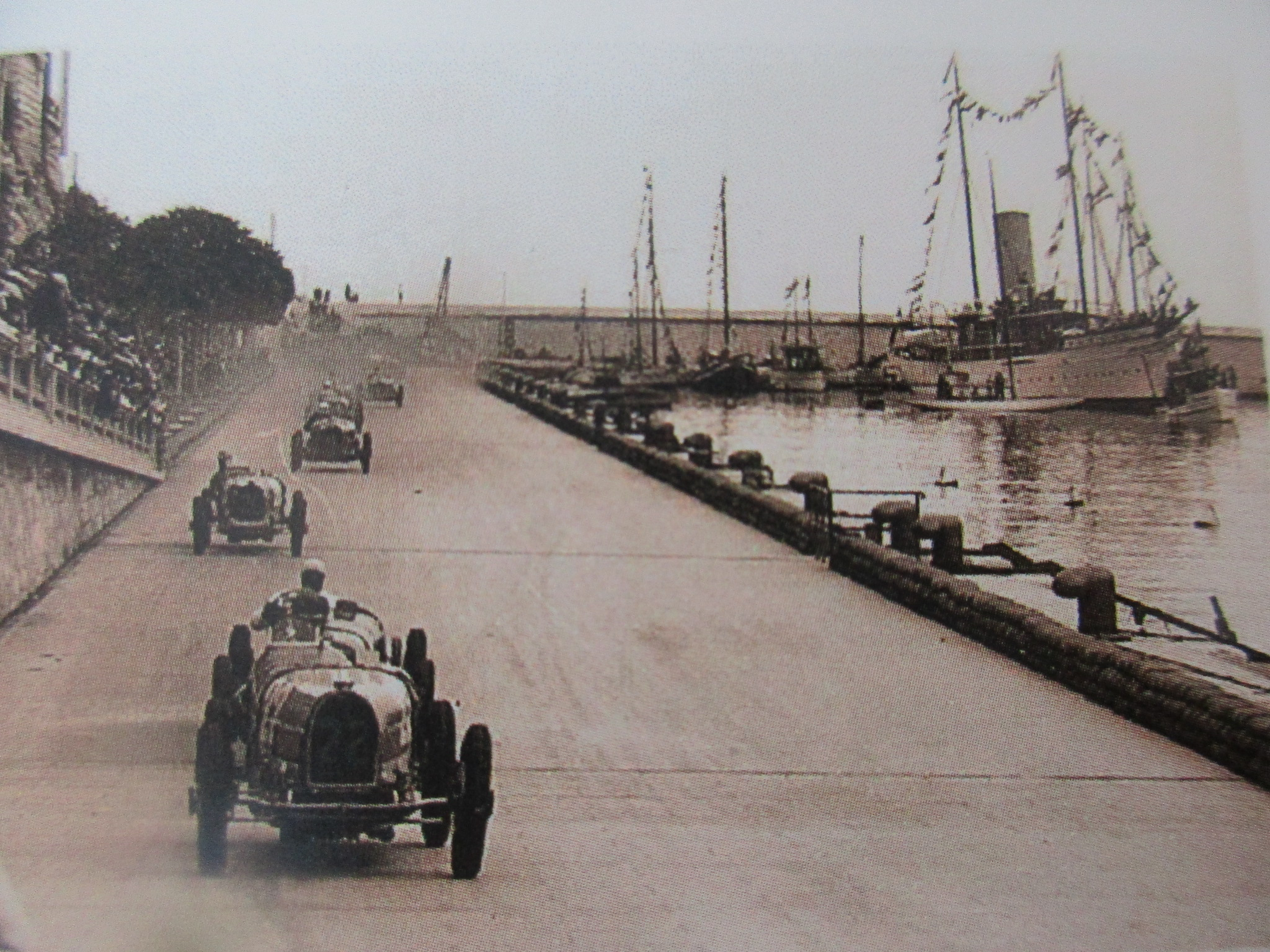
Monaco GP- The Bugatti of ”Williams” in front, along the quay

This year, the practice times were recorded and published for each driver, although the grid would still be decided by ballot. In the busy city, Thursday and Friday practices were for an hour starting at 6am. On the first day, Penn-Hughes crashed and broke both his ankle and his car’s suspension. For two days, the burly Divo tried to get the Type 53 Bugatti around the course, but with sluggish times fully fourteen seconds behind the leaders, he chose to qualify the Type 51 for the Saturday practice. Half the field had matched or bettered Dreyfus' lap record from the previous year. At the end of the Saturday practice, Zanelli parked the Nacional Pescara, also being well of the pace. Race-day was overcast but dry. Chiron had been fastest in practice and vaulted from the second row into the lead up the hill, chased by “Williams” and Lehoux. Despite starting from the fourth and fifth rows, in ten laps Nuvolari and Varzi had worked their way up to second and third. With Chiron holding a 20-second gap, the leading trio pulled away from the rest of the field. Chiron was being delayed lapping the tail-enders allowing Nuvolari to close up. On lap 30, coming out of the tunnel, an impatient Chiron tried to squeeze past Czaykowski’s Bugatti at the chicane. Clipping a sandbag the car spun and rolled, throwing the driver onto the track. Nuvolari picked his way past the mayhem while Chiron, only dazed, was able to get to safety. As the refuelling stops started around 40 laps, the Alfa Romeo had eased out a 30-second lead over Varzi with 10-second gaps each back to Borzacchini, Caracciola and Fagioli. Divo, Lehoux and Étancelin lost laps with engine issues then Czaykowski retired with a broken gearbox. When Varzi pitted with terminal suspension problems on lap 57 the race looked sewn up for Alfa Romeo. Nuvolari eased off, with his own fuel difficulties, but took the victory. Although Borzacchini fell back and retired with failing brakes, Caracciola held station, finishing three seconds behind making it an Alfa 1-2. Fagioli was third, over two minutes back, with Earl Howe leading the rest of the field home three laps further back. Neither Alfa Romeo had had to stop to refuel, and team manager Aldo Giovannini congratulated Caracciola on his sportsmanship and signed him up to the works team.

A week later, two Grands Prix were held. Many of the French drivers were at Oran in French Algeria. In a three-hour timed race in a field dominated by Bugattis, it provided the first victory for the 24-year old Jean-Pierre Wimille. The race was also the race-debut for the young local, Guy Moll. Mentored by fellow-Algerian Marcel Lehoux, he had initially led the notable field in his older T35C and was well placed until running out of fuel. Meanwhile, the Italian drivers were at the Roman airfield circuit at Littorio. Scuderia Ferrari (Piero Taruffi and Franco Comotti) and Maserati (Fagioli, Dreyfus and Ruggeri) led the entry list. Fagioli was given the new 5-litre V5 for the open, fast circuit. Varzi has his own Bugatti, but Chiron was still recovering from his accident at Monaco. After heavy rain overnight and in the morning, the heats were run on a drying track. With the King of Italy in attendance, the final started with Fagioli in the big V5 leading the first lap. Behind him Varzi, Taruffi, von Morgen and Dreyfus scrabbled for the minor placings. While the others had assorted engine and tyre issues, the new Maserati ran flawlessly for the ninety-minute race and Fagioli led from start to finish, almost 30 seconds ahead of Taruffi with von Morgen two minutes back in third.

Racing in Great Britain centred on Brooklands and because of the limited number of drivers in each class, were invariably run as handicap ‘scratch’ races. British interest was less in grand-prix racing than for land speed records and sports car racing – given the fame that the Bentley Boys had achieved at Le Mans. This year, one of two formal races held at Brooklands was the inaugural British Empire Trophy run as a pair of heats with a 100-mile final. This saw the land-speed-record monsters of John Cobb (10.6-litre V12 Delage) and George Eyston (8-litre Panhard) matched against each other. Other entries included Woolf Barnato's Bentley Speed Six, driven by Jack Dunfee, and Tim Birkin in his 4.5-litre Blower Bentley. Earl Howe in his 1.5-litre supercharged Delage won the first heat from Henken Widengren, while Eyston won the second. The six finalists lined up side-by-side on the wide track. Cobb took the lead using the Delage's phenomenal acceleration, pursued by Eyston, the two Bentleys, Howe and Widengren. Then he eased off to conserve his tyres, allowing Birkin to overtake and take the lead. However, twenty minutes in at the halfway point, the Bentley’s cylinder head cracked fatally soon after the radiator had run dry. Eyston took the lead until he too eased off to conserve his tyres. Cobb pushed again to overtake and for the final ten laps the two duelled for the lead with Cobb just winning by a car-length from Eyston. Howe was third after Dunfee was mistakenly stopped a lap early by an over-zealous track official. A protest was lodged by Eyston's crew saying Cobb had been deliberately blocking. The result was overturned until a fortnight later when an appeal by Cobb saw the result reversed back again.

=== May and the Targa Florio ===
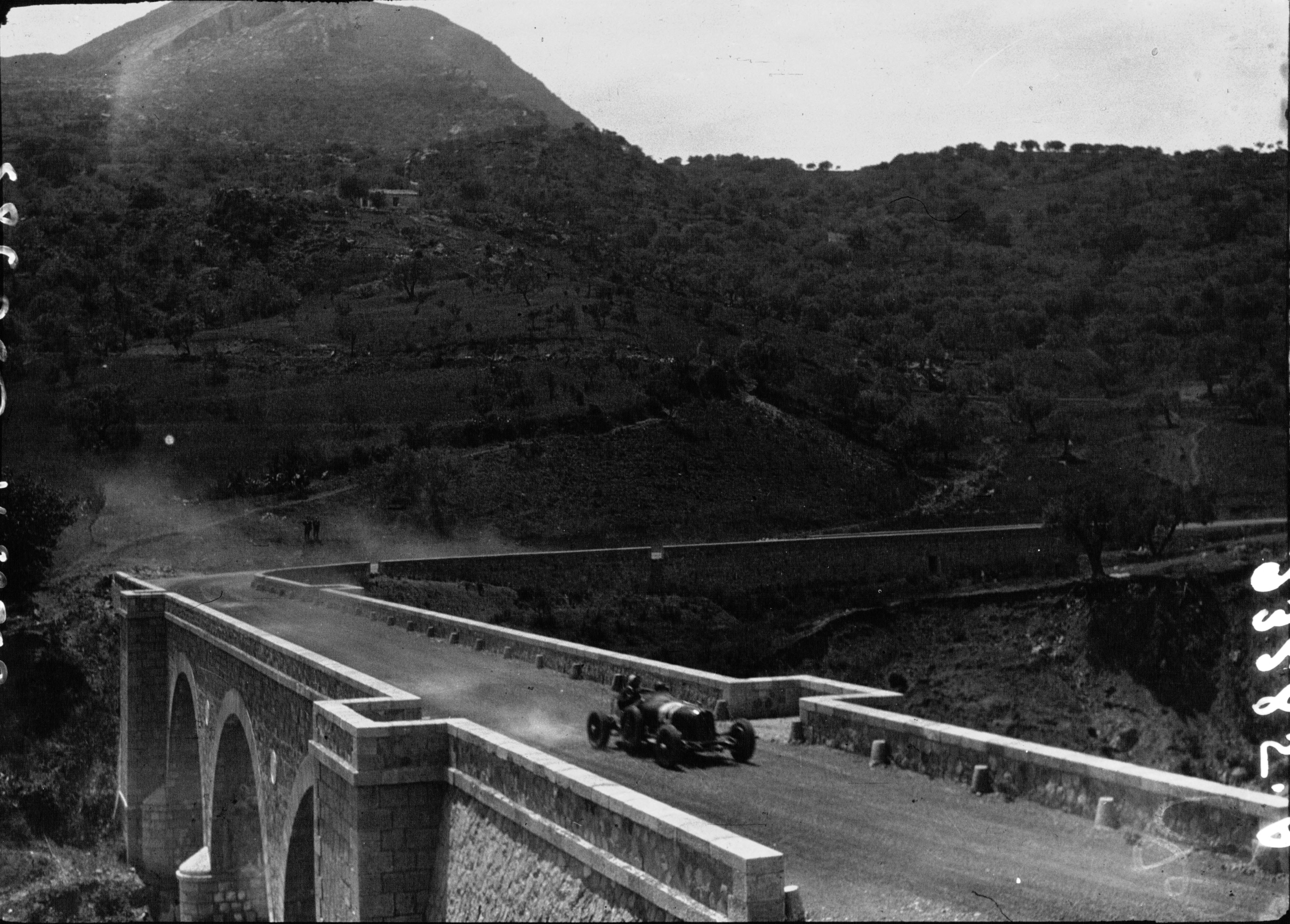
Nuvolari, en route to winning the Targa Florio

After the disruption and problems from the heavy rains in Sicily of the previous year, Vincenzo Florio, race organiser of the Targa, obtained a private audience with Benito Mussolini. An avid motor-racing fan himself, the leader authorised the construction of a new road to bypass the highest parts of the Madonie course. Known as the “Piccolo Circuito Madonie”, the revised course was 72 km and gave the spectators eight sightings of the cars rather than the traditional four laps of years gone by.

Once again, it was the Scuderia Ferrari that represented Alfa Romeo, entering a strong team of five cars. It included Nuvolari and Borzacchini from the works team, as well as Pietro Ghersi, Antonio Brivio and the Marquis Guido d'Ippolito. The Maserati team had cars for Fagioli and Ruggeri, while Varzi and Chiron represented Bugatti albeit as independent drivers, along with Italian Archimede Rosa. On a hot, dry day, the reduced field of sixteen started at 3-minute intervals. Starting midfield, Nuvolari put in a blistering first lap to hold a near 2-minute lead on elapsed time over Borzacchini and Chiron, followed by Varzi and Brivio. The Maseratis, though powerful on open road circuits, were well back and struggling on the tight twisty country roads. Nuvolari continued to extend his lead and by half-distance had a five-minute lead over team-mate Borzacchini with only six drivers still running. Chiron had been running third after stops to change brakes but stopped on the fifth lap from heat-exhaustion and still not feeling 100% after his Monaco accident. Varzi took over his car as his own car's gearbox had already packed up. And this was how it stayed, with Nuvolari taking the win to rapturous applause from the spectators. His race-average of 79.3 km/h was a record that stood for twenty years.

Following their success in the Swedish Winter Grand prix the previous year, Finnish drivers invested their money to support the Helsinki Automobile Club organise its own race on the streets surrounding Eläintarha park in Helsinki. The entry list was limited to ten: five Finnish and five Swedish drivers. Favourites were locals Karl Ebb (SSK) and Sulo Keinänen (Chrysler) up against Knut-Gustav Sundstedt (Bugatti) and Per-Victor Widengren (another SSK). Heavy overnight rain did not dissuade upwards of 30000 spectators turning out on the sunny afternoon. Widengren soon took the lead that he never relinquished. Ebb in the other SSK was second until passed by Sundstedt on lap 17. By lap 33 Ebb had lapped the field and Sundstedt's car started smoking. Soon Ebb and Keinänen caught him in an exciting tussle for second place. Keinänen passed them both to take second, but due to indecisive work by the officials Ebb did three extra laps until convinced by the crowd that he had won.

A strong field assembled for the inaugural Nîmes Grand Prix. The 3 km circuit was essentially two boulevards running parallel to each other through the city. A series of races were held for different classes, as the Trophée de Provence. The 1.5-litre race was won by Anne-Cécile Rose-Itier in her Bugatti 37A. Although she had previously won hill-climb events, this was significant as an outright win for a woman in a road-race event in the male-dominated sport. In the main race Étancelin had his Alfa Romeo and Dreyfus ran a Maserati as an independent. The rest of the field were Bugattis, led by Chiron, Czaykowski and Benoît Falchetto in their Type 51s. Chiron took the lead at the start while Étancelin got caught in a pile-up at the first corner. But after only a dozen laps the Monegasque had retired with a broken oil pipe. This left Falchetto with a healthy gap over Dreyfus and Czaykowski and he went on to take a deserved first victory.

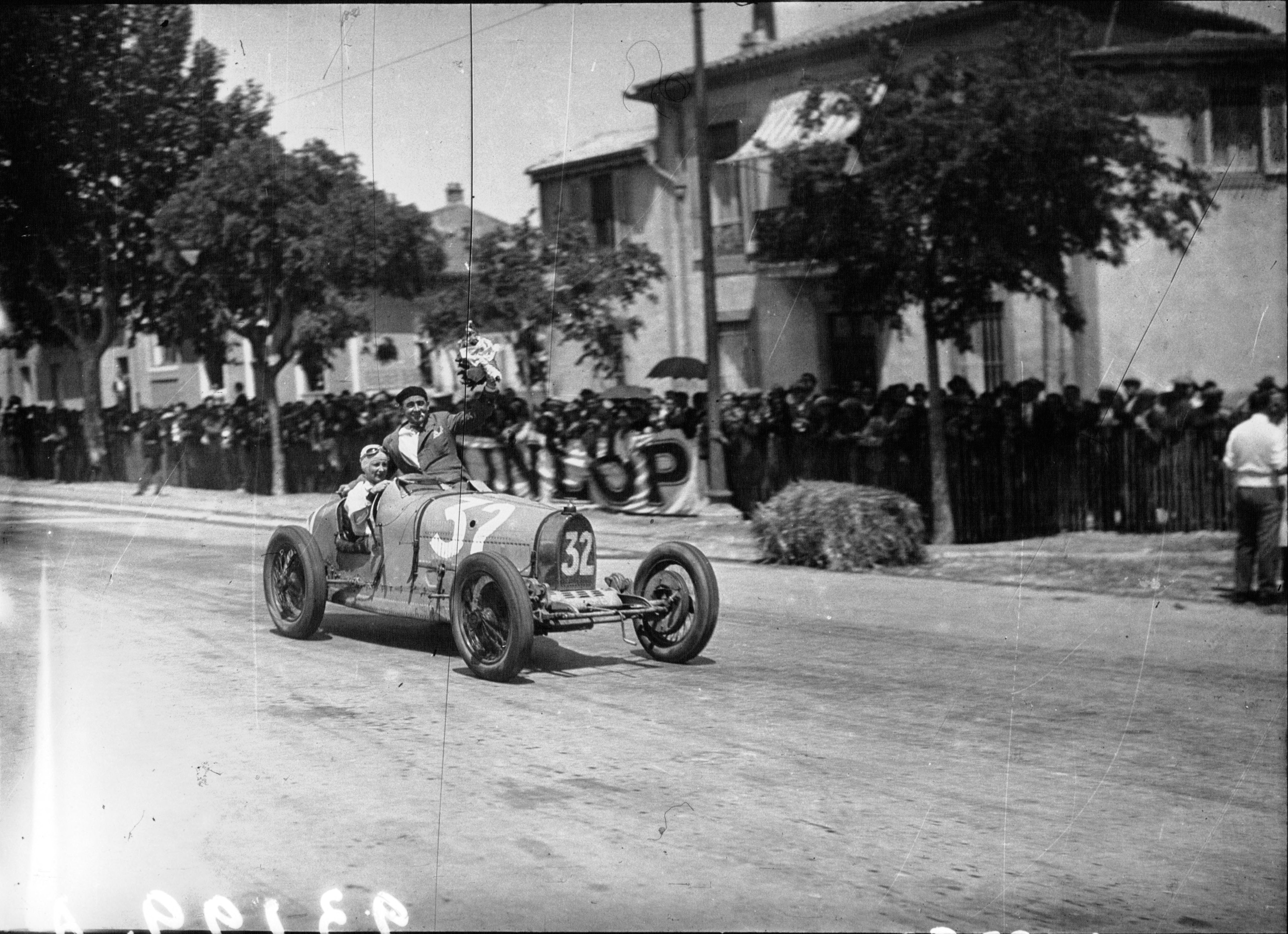
Anne-Cecile Rose-Itier wins the Provence voiturette race

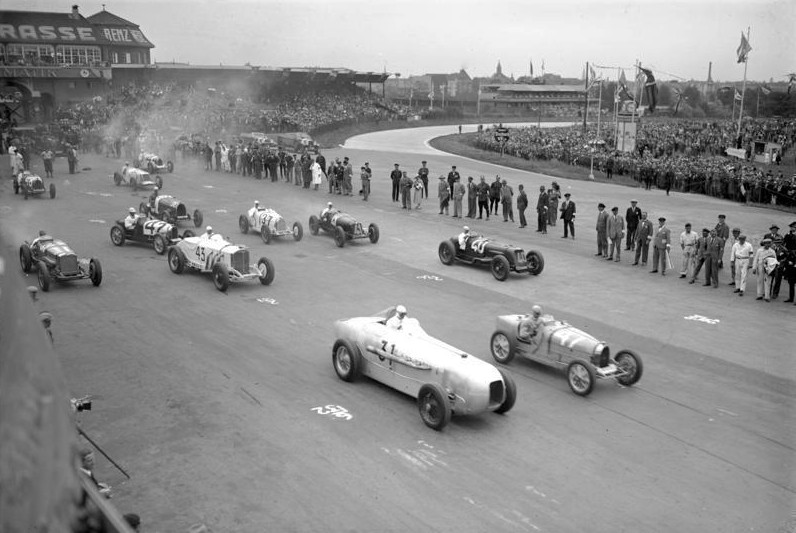
Start of the Avusrennen: von Brauchitsch's “streamliner” dwarfing Bouriat's Bugatti

The resumption of racing at AVUS in 1931 continued the ongoing resurgence of German motor-racing. Regarded as the fastest race-track in Europe, the race attracted a field of high quality. Last year’s winner, Rudi Caracciola, had left Mercedes-Benz when they closed their racing program and moved to Alfa Romeo. He got a hostile welcome by the fans. Bugatti had their works drivers Chiron and Varzi in the big 5-litre Type 54 and Bouriat (Type 51) with “Williams” as a privateer. Maserati likewise split their options with Fagioli running the 8C-2800 while Dreyfus driving the mighty, new twin-engine V5. Disappointed with the Type 54, Heinrich-Joachim von Morgen led his German Bugatti Team with a new Type 51 along with Hermann zu Leiningen. Meanwhile, Czech driver Prince Georg-Christian von Lobkowicz did choose to run a Type 54. World Speed Record holder Sir Malcolm Campbell brought the 1925 4-litre V12 Sunbeam Tiger to take on the 7-litre Mercedes of Hans Stuck. But the sensation was Mercedes of Manfred von Brauchitsch, fitted with a smooth, unpainted metal aerodynamic shell, aiming to increase its top speed by 20 km/h. Berliners nicknamed it the “cigar” and the “cucumber”.

The extreme speeds at the circuit had been withering on tyre wear, so practice sessions were held for the teams to test their tyres. Stuck set a new lap record averaging 209 km/h, despite the track also being used for public traffic at the time. Even faster times were recorded in official practice by Bugatti and Maserati. After a week of hot weather, race-day was cold with rain looming. It did not dissuade a record crowd of 200 000 spectators turning up. In the prelude, Earl Howe totally dominated the voiturette race, with his 1927-vintage Delage 15S8, lapping the entire field twice still showing the class of that championship winning model. In the main race, Chiron and Varzi were dissatisfied with their tyres and chose not to start, with reserve-driver Divo taking over a Type 54. There was also the matter that Varzi and Chiron had double-entered themselves for the Casablanca Grand Prix being held on the same day. Racing regulations decreed this was illegal and would have disqualified them from either race. At the start it was Divo and Dreyfus that duelled initially for the lead. But a bad accident happened in the midfield on the first lap. Approaching the Südschleife (South Loop) three-wide at over 200 km/h, Hans Lewy, in the PiLeSi Bugatti was overtaking the Lobkowicz Bugatti. Making room, the Czech running in the middle, overcorrected and lost control. The car slewed into the 8m wide grass median strip. Hitting the ditch, it got airborne and ended up on the railway tracks running parallel to the track. Lobkowicz was thrown out and died several hours later from severe head injuries. Lewy brushed the wall of an overbridge, breaking his suspension. He also crossed the median strip and rolled several times on the opposite straight before drifting back to the grass. Divo, accelerating out of the curve narrowly missed the careering car but was showered with wooden splinters from the wheel hub. After three laps, the field was already strung out after a number of cars had pitted with engine issues. Divo was leading with team-mate Bouriat thirty seconds behind hounded by Caracciola. A lap later, Bouriat's supercharger broke and Divo now led the Germans Caracciola, von Brauchitsch, Stuck and Stuber, with Williams going very fast in sixth making up time after stopping to change sparkplugs. But the torrid pace told and Divo's race ended in a cloud of smoke with a broken oil-pipe. A thrilling duel took place for the lead with Caracciola's Alfa faster in the corners while the streamlined Mercedes would pass him on the straights. Williams had made it up to third before falling back with power issues, leaving Stuck and Stuber swapping places for third. On the last lap, Caracciola led out of the Südschleife but von Brauchitsch blasted past at over 230 km/h. With a 5-second lead going into the Nordschleife corner he was able to hold on to take his first major victory. Stuber's Bugatti was third, nearly three-quarters of a lap behind. Before retiring, Dreyfus had pitted for new tyres and set the lap record in the big Maserati V5. In covering the 300km in only 91 minutes, the race set a record as the fastest in history to date. In his exuberance, radio commentator Paul Laven likened von Brauchitsch's car to a “silver arrow”, coining a famous epithet of German racers.

Held on the same day, the Casablanca Grand Prix attracted the top French privateers. Bugatti had entered Chiron and Varzi but their no-show infuriated the race officials, who filed an official protest with the AIACR. Raced on a new circuit through the suburbs of Casablanca, the Alfas of Étancelin and Zehender would take on the big Type 54 Bugatti of Lehoux and the Type 51s of Wimille, Czaykowski, Falchetto and Gaupillat. Jean de Maleplane had the sole Maserati. Wimille took the lead and built it steadily to have a 50-second gap to Lehoux by half-distance. Behind them were Étancelin, Czaykowski, Maleplane and Pierre Veyron in his 1.5-litre Bugatti leading the voiturette class. Having just made his regular pit-stop for tyres and fuel, Wimille suddenly slowed and retired with engine trouble. This left Lehoux to carry on to take a comfortable victory with only Étancelin's Alfa Romeo still on the lead lap. Falchetto, winner at Nîmes a week earlier, finished fourth but managed to crash on his slow-down lap sustaining mild injuries.

The Eifelrennen was held a week later at the Nürburgring, attracting many of the same drivers as had been at AVUS. This year it was run on the Nordschleife circuit for the first time, rather than using the Südschleife since 1928. Chiron arrived in a factory Bugatti while Dreyfus, unhappy with the performance of the Maserati had left the team and borrowed Chiron’s own Type 51 Bugatti. Von Brauchitsch had his silver painted Mercedes-Benz SSKL, this time minus the streamlined body, joined by Stuck and Broschek while Caracciola ran his white-painted Alfa Romeo. Practice was marred by the fatal accident to Heinrich-Joachim von Morgen. Although there were no witnesses, it appeared his car had strayed wide at the gentle Hatzenbach corner and rolled, killing von Morgen instantly. Without their lead-driver, the German Bugatti Team would later be broken up and closed down. Morning rain had cleared by the time of the race and the three classes were started at 4-minute intervals in front of 120,000 spectators – the lead class with just the six drivers. Caracciola and Dreyfus were soon out in front with the powerful, lumbering sports cars of Stuck and von Brauchitsch unable to keep up on the twisty circuit, and Chiron and Broschek having engine problems. A rain-shower returned halfway through the race but Caracciola won by 22 seconds from Dreyfus, who had done well in his first appearance at the very difficult circuit and only two days' practice.

=== The European Championship races ===
Held in the middle of the racing season, the European Championship was three races run over seven weeks. It started in June with the Italian Grand Prix held at Monza. Running to the new 5-hour AIACR regulations, fifteen cars took the grid. Alfa Romeo unveiled its sensational new model, the Tipo B monoposto, for Nuvolari and Campari, while Borzacchini and Caracciola ran the race-proven 8C-2300. They were supported by two more Monzas, for Scuderia Ferrari's Pietro Ghersi and Eugenio Siena. Maserati gave its 5-litre V5 to Fagioli, and Ruggeri had the 8C model, now bored out to 2.8-litres. Bugatti similarly gave their premier drivers, Varzi and Chiron, the big-engined Type 54 and Divo ran a Type 51. The field was completed with privateers Lehoux and Dreyfus in Bugattis and Castelbarco and Premoli with Maserati. From the start, the race was a close and exciting tussle between the works cars with positions changing constantly. Caracciola was an early casualty losing a quarter-hour with a faulty magneto. Approaching the first hour, after 15 laps, Fagioli had a narrow lead over Nuvolari, followed by Campari and Varzi with Chiron who was only 30 seconds behind in fifth. Over the next half-hour, cars started pitting for fuel and tyre changes. Soon after, Borzacchini now running fourth, was hit in the head by a stone thrown up by a car he was overtaking. He made it back to the pits, bloodied, and was relieved by reserve driver Marinoni. Then Varzi pitted with a ruined transmission. Worse, a lap later, his teammate Chiron crept into the pits. After losing time clearing blocked fuel lines, Varzi took the car back out. After two hours it was Nuvolari, Campari and Fagioli each 30 seconds apart and a lap ahead of Marinoni, Dreyfus and Siena. But on lap 50 Campari pitted to change tyres and lost 8 minutes when he could not get re-started. An exhausted Fagioli pitted on lap 60 for more tyres and fuel, but spent over 4 minutes stationary before handing over to Ernesto Maserati. Recovered, Fagioli took his car back over again after ten laps. He set some blistering times trying to make up the lost time and gradually reeled in the cars ahead of him to a thrilling finish. But Nuvolari, and his new Tipo B, had not missed a beat. Unlike most others, he drove on without relief to take the victory. Fagioli finished second, a lap behind. Despite behind faster he was stymied by poor pitwork, losing over eleven minutes to the Alfas who pitted for a fraction of that time. A great day for Alfa Romeo was cemented by Borzacchini (assisted by Marinoni and Caracciola) and Campari taking third and fourth with the privateer Bugatti of Dreyfus in an excellent fifth, all on the same lap. Nuvolari's normally shy and retiring wife, Carolina, was asked to anoint him with the winner laurel wreath in front of an ecstatic crowd.

The next race in the Championship was the French Grand Prix. This year it was held for the first time at the Reims circuit where the Marne Grand Prix was usually held. The circuit was a very fast 7.8 km triangular track, again suiting the bigger-engined cars. Maserati was a significant no-show, unable to afford to send the team to France. It left the race as a straight showdown between Alfa Romeo and Bugatti. The triumphant Alfa Romeo team had now equipped all four drivers with the Tipo B. Bugatti again had its two Type 54s, but Chiron swapped his seat for Divo's Type 51. The sixteen starters were filled out by French and British privateers: Étancelin, Zehender and Wimille had their Alfa Romeos against the Bugattis of Lehoux and Earl Howe (Type 54) and “Williams”, Dreyfus, Gaupillat and Fourny (Type 51).

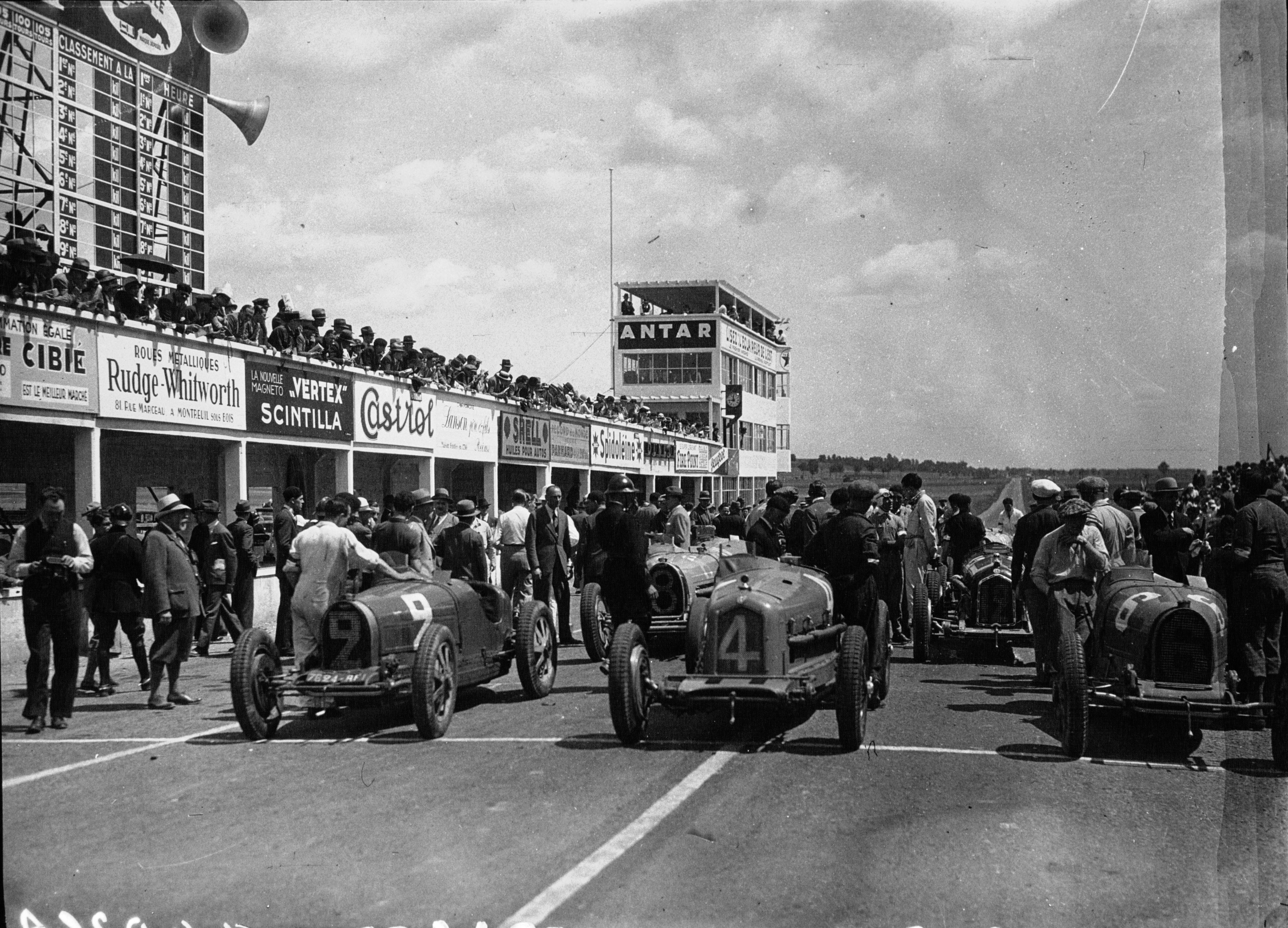
Grid for the French GP

A hot sunny day attracted 100,000 spectators for the midday start. From the third row, the Alfa Romeo of Caracciola shot into a lead he held for the first ten laps. He was overtaken by a furious Nuvolari, moving up through the field, shaking his fist at his teammate while passing him in front of the main grandstand. Varzi retired, once again, with a broken gearbox and soon the Alfas were running in a close 1-2-3 formation. On lap 20 Caracciola and Borzacchini passed their team leader, with only Williams, Chiron, Dreyfus and Wimille left on the lead lap. By half distance, as the cars started making their regular pit-stops, this had fallen to five cars. Williams had made one of the earliest stops but within five laps another stripped tread forced him to pit again, dropping him out of the running. Howe had lost 6 minutes having a brake-pad changed and Lehoux had stopped at Gueux with a broken gearbox. Divo stopped just before the Thillois hairpin having run out of fuel from a cracked fuel-tank and a pit miscalculation left Wimille also marooned without fuel out on the track. By the three-hour mark, Nuvolari was leading again and by the four-hour mark the three Alfas were a lap ahead. Following team-order, Caracciola fell back to let Borzacchini through. Team manager Jano signalled his team for a formation finish with Nuvolari taking the win ahead of Borzacchini, Caracciola with Chiron's Bugatti back in fourth, a lap behind.

The third and final race in the European Championship was the German Grand Prix, held a fortnight later. The AvD (Automobilclub von Deutschland) had three classes running to different race-lengths – the open Class I would do 25 laps of the Nürburgring while the little 800cc cyclecars would only do 19 laps. It put a big field of 31 cars from 10 nations onto the track. The dominant Alfa Romeo works team were the favourites with three Tipo B cars for Nuvolari, Caracciola and Borzacchini. A fourth car for Campari did not arrive. Bugatti opted to run the Type 51 for the winding track rather than the bigger (and more unreliable) Type 54, and had entered four cars. However, in the end, only Chiron and Divo started with Bouriat away and doctors urging Varzi to rest after getting glass in his eye at Reims. Maserati only had the single car in Class I: Ruggeri had the 8C with a new 3-litre engine squeezed into it. But they also entered a 1.1-litre 4CM voiturette in Class II driven by Ernesto Maserati. The two German racing teams split their entries. The new, Bugatti-equipped PiLeSi Racing Team had Paul Pietsch (Type 35B) and Hans Lewy (Type 51) in Class I, and a Type 37 for Hans Simon in Class II. After the death of Morgen, the German Bugatti Team only ran a Type 37 for Ernst-Günther Burggaller in Class II. The Type 51s of Lehoux and Dreyfus made up the rest of the open class, while from Britain Earl Howe in his Delage and two Frazer Nash cars took on the Bugattis in Class II. The race-day was cold and foggy, but dry and 120-150,000 spectators came to the Ardennes track. All three classes started together and from pole position, Caracciola immediately jumped into the lead. At the end of the first lap the three Alfas led the three Bugattis, with Hans Täuberc 6C-1500 just ahead of Howe's Delage. Already Ruggeri’s Maserati had terminal engine problems, and both German Bugatti cars were in the pits. Lewy was unwell so Pietsch took over his car. Caracciola kept building his lead and after an hour was almost a minute ahead of Nuvolari. Chiron had pitted with problems traced back to the distributor but then also lost time when an oil-pipe broke spraying hot oil onto his face. He then stopped out on the track with a broken rear axle, as had Lehoux a few laps earlier. Pietsch had done well making up time, but overdid it at the South Curve. The car rolled three times launching the driver into the neighbouring field. Fortunately, aside from a few scratches, Pietsch was uninjured. After two hours, coming up to the first pit-stops, Nuvolari was catching Caracciola and put in the fastest lap of the race and in fact passed him to be first into the pits. Giovannini, perhaps mindful of Caracciola's performance at Monaco, or wanting to reward his German driver in his home race advised the team of his racing orders. Nuvolari, although annoyed, obeyed and held station – knowing he would still win the overall Championship. The remainder of the race was processional with the Alfas again finishing 1-2-3, with Dreyfus the only other main-class finisher a quarter of an hour behind. The Swiss driver Täuber saw off the challenge of Howe's Delage (who had fuel pump issues) and won the Class II by a lap from the Hungarian László Hartmann and Maserati in third. For reasons unknown, the AvD had decided the race would be run over 25 laps for the top class, rather than the minimum 5-hours of the AIACR regulations. The other national organisations simply flagged the cars after the time had elapsed. Rather than building in a small “overage” in case, an embarrassing miscalculation on the lap times of the cars meant that all three Alfa Romeo’s easily completed that distance within the 5-hour margin, thereby technically rendering the race null and void. The recent Eifelrennen race given them current racing speeds rather than using the previous year's results, so their negligence was inexcusable for an international event.

With the clean sweep of all three races, Alfa Romeo won the European Championship and Tazio Nuvolari was proclaimed this year's champion driver. In an increasingly crowded race schedule outside of the national Grands Prix, it was inevitable that Italian and French season races would conflict with each other. The Italian works teams focussed on their own series and the greater prestige attracted the top drivers more often to the detriment of French racing. Bugatti, in contrast, would often split their team to cover both series. In front of a huge crowd (>150,000) Chiron got his first victory of the season at Dieppe over the top French privateers, and then repeated it a week later at Nice. Earlier, “Phi-Phi” Étancelin had won the Picardy GP, and Jean-Pierre Wimille the Lorraine GP, then Goffredo Zehender won at St Gaudens, all racing the Alfa Romeo Monza.

=== The latter races ===
At the Coppa Ciano, Alfa Corse gave Nuvolari and Borzacchini the Tipo B, while Campari had a Monza. Their customer team, Scuderia Ferrari had four Monzas for Ghersi, Brivio, d’Ippolito and Taruffi. Their strongest competition would be Achille Varzi in his red-painted Bugatti. The privateers also included Luigi Premoli and Clemente Biondetti with their Maserati-engined Bugatti specials. Due to the narrow streets, the cars were released three at a time in 1-minute intervals. Varzi, in the front row, took the lead while Nuvolari started in the fifth group away. On the first lap Premoli crashed badly when he hid a roadside marker. It wrecked the rear axle; the car rolled and tumbled down a ravine leaving Premoli severely injured for over a year to recover. The staggered start made for a routine race with no interaction between the main protagonists. Although Varzi crossed the line first, on elapsed time it was the three Alfas that beat him, headed by Nuvolari.

For the Coppa Acerbo on the fast Pescara circuit the Bugatti works team sent Varzi and Chiron to take on the Alfa Romeos, themselves bolstered by Caracciola rejoining the works team. Nuvolari and a Tipo B were run under the Scuderia Ferrari banner in a one-off, as a reward from Alfa Romeo for being a diligent customer team. Maserati was also entered with the V5 for Fagioli and the 3-litre 8C for Ruggeri; and Earl Howe had his supercharged 1.5-litre Delage. It was another power circuit: a dozen laps of a 25 km track, starting with a climb from Pescara up into the Abruzzi Mountains where it twisted and turned to Cappelle sul Tavo, then a long straight downhill to Montesilvano on the coast before the triangle was completed with another long smooth straight dashing along the coast. Popular with the drivers it also attracted the two Mercedes-Benzes of von Brauchitsch and Broschek from Germany. Although privateers, Mercedes racing manager Alfred Neubauer once again accompanied his protégé, von Brauchitsch. Race day was a very hot summer day, and many teams were concerned about the heat's effect on tyre wear. Borzacchini got the best start off the line, but halfway around, through the hills, Caracciola and Nuvolari overtook him. At the end of the first lap they were barely a second apart with Borzacchini leading the rest of the pack already 30 seconds behind. Back in tenth place, Howe was having a great battle in his Delage with Broschek's giant Mercedes when a man stepped out in front of them, before being yanked back to safety by another spectator. By the third lap he was already six minutes ahead of his nearest rival in the 1.5-litre class. On the fourth lap, a tyre tread came off Fagioli's Maserati, badly bruising his arm and he lost two minutes limping back to the pits to get it replaced. Ernesto Maserati relieved him and jumped in the car. On lap five Giovannini signalled the Alfas to ease their lap-times to conserve their engines, which they did although Nuvolari took the opportunity to overtake Caracciola for the lead. Enzo Ferrari signalled Nuvolari (his driver for this race) to pick up his pace. Taruffi had been bearing down on Chiron, in third place, until on lap 7 he came in too fast on the corner at Cappelle. Side-swiping a house, it wrecked his suspension but the driver was uninjured. Although Caracciola was putting in faster laps, Nuvolari held on to take the victory, fourteen seconds ahead of the German, with Chiron, Brivio and the big Maserati the only other drivers to reach the finish before the crowd overflowed onto the track.

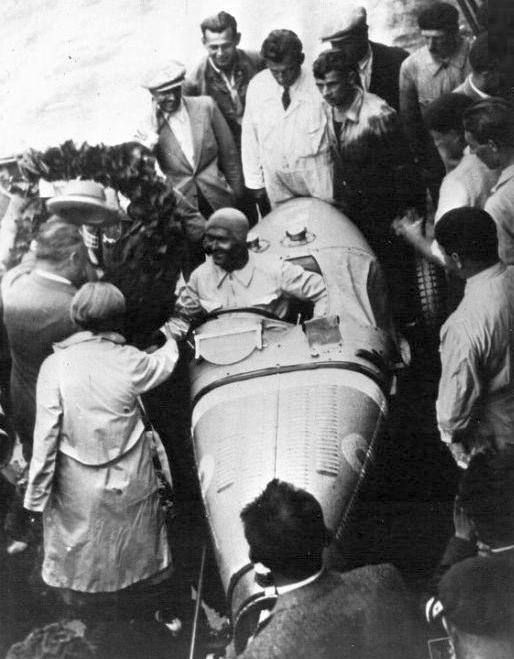
Masaryk GP- Winner Chiron in his Bugatti Type 51

This year, the third running of the Masaryk Circuit attracted a top-class field for another Bugatti-Alfa Romeo-Maserati contest. The Bugatti team had three Type 51 cars for Chiron, Varzi and Guy Bouriat, brought in for René Dreyfus who had been injured at the Comminges GP. Scuderia Ferrari represented Alfa Romeo, with a Tipo B this time driven by Borzacchini, while Nuvolari, Brivio and Siena had 2.3-litre Monzas. Maserati once again ran an 8C-3000, this time for Fagioli, while Maserati himself gain had a 4CM for the "voiturette" class that would only run 15 laps while the main class did 17 laps of the 29 km track. Other entrants in Class II included Ernst-Günther Burggaller in a new Bugatti type 51A, and former Bugatti stalwart Pierre Veyron driving a 1.5-litre Maserati Tipo 26 and Jaroslav Konečnik racing for the local Czech Wikov works team. Race-day was damp with drizzle but that did not stop 200,000 spectators arriving, from as far afield as Vienna and Budapest. Siena had crashed in practice and broken his leg so only ten Class I cars took the grid. Once again Borzacchini got an impressive start, jumping to the lead from the second row. Varzi's eye injury was still giving him great discomfort and he retired on lap 2. Meanwhile, Nuvolari had passed Chiron and Borzacchini to take the lead. At the halfway point, Nuvolari had just set the fastest lap of the race and the two Alfas had a gap to Chiron, Fagioli and Brivio. Burggaller and Maserati were duelling in the small class. On the tenth lap, Nuvolari's Alfa developed an ignition problem. Stopping out on the track, he did running repairs before getting back to the pit. But he lost a lap and it allowed Chiron and Fagioli to pass. Desperately trying to un-lap himself and overtake Chiron, Nuvolari bowled several mileage markers and blew a tyre, ending his chance for victory. Chiron carried on to win by five minutes from Fagioli, with Nuvolari a distant third, almost thirty minutes back. It was the first defeat of the Tipo B. In the "voiturette" class, Maserati was leading into the last lap when the engine suddenly burst into flame. Assisted by onlookers he was able to extinguish the fire but the time lost put Burggaller through to take the class victory. Burggaller then went on to complete the remaining two laps assigned to the main class as well, and only finished a minute behind Brivio's fourth-placed Alfa Romeo.

The Monza Grand Prix was the final event of the Italian racing-season. As previously, it would be run as a series of heats leading up to a 20-lap final. However, this year rather than dividing the heats by engine size, the entrants were randomly balloted to the three heats. The three great rivals all met again: Alfa Romeo had the Tipo B for Nuvolari, Borzacchini, Campari and Caracciola, supported by Ferrari's two cars for Brivio and Taruffi. Bugatti bought the 5-litre Type 54 for Varzi and Chiron, while Maserati had the big V5 for Fagioli and the new 8C-3000 for Ruggeri and Minozzi. Top privateers included Lehoux (Bugatti) and Broschek (Mercedes-Benz), while the smallest cars were the 1.5-litre Delage of Earl Howe, Mario Moradei's Talbot 700 and a surprise entry from American “Leon Duray” with a Miller 91. The top-four qualifiers from each heat would automatically qualify for the final, while the other finishers would race off in a 5-lap sprint for the four remaining spots. Caracciola won the first heat comfortably from a well-performed Minozzi in the new Maserati (despite blowing a tyre on the last lap), Varzi and Lehoux. The second heat pitted Nuvolari, Fagioli and Chiron against each other. The Alfa Romeo and Maserati had an exciting slipstreaming duel, constantly changing places, until Nuvolari attempted a bold pass at the Vialone corner on the street-circuit. Hitting the curb, he broke a wheel and had to pit. Chiron also damaged a wheel going off course but managed to pit and finished fourth, a lap behind Taruffi.The third heat was a more sedate affair with team-mates Campari and Borzacchini easily heading home Ruggeri and Biondetti in his home-built special. Duray’s Miller was showing its age and had already been lapped when he crashed on lap 5. Before the start of the repêchage, a livid Nuvolari lodged an official protest that Fagioli had been deliberately blocking him in their heat. Team manager Giovannini backed him up and threatened to withdraw the three Alfa Romeo team cars if the Maserati driver was not disqualified. The officials inspected the Vialone corner where Nuvolari had had to brake hard and bounce the curb in avoidance. They then announced they would defer their decision until after the race. The repêchage itself allowed Brivio, Broschek, along with privateers Félix and Maleplane to qualify. The biggest event was Howe’s accident at the second Lesmo corner on the first lap. The car slid off the track and wrapped itself completely around a tree in a smash that totally wrecked the Delage. Howe, amazingly, was uninjured aside from being dazed from a head blow that cracked his crash-helmet.

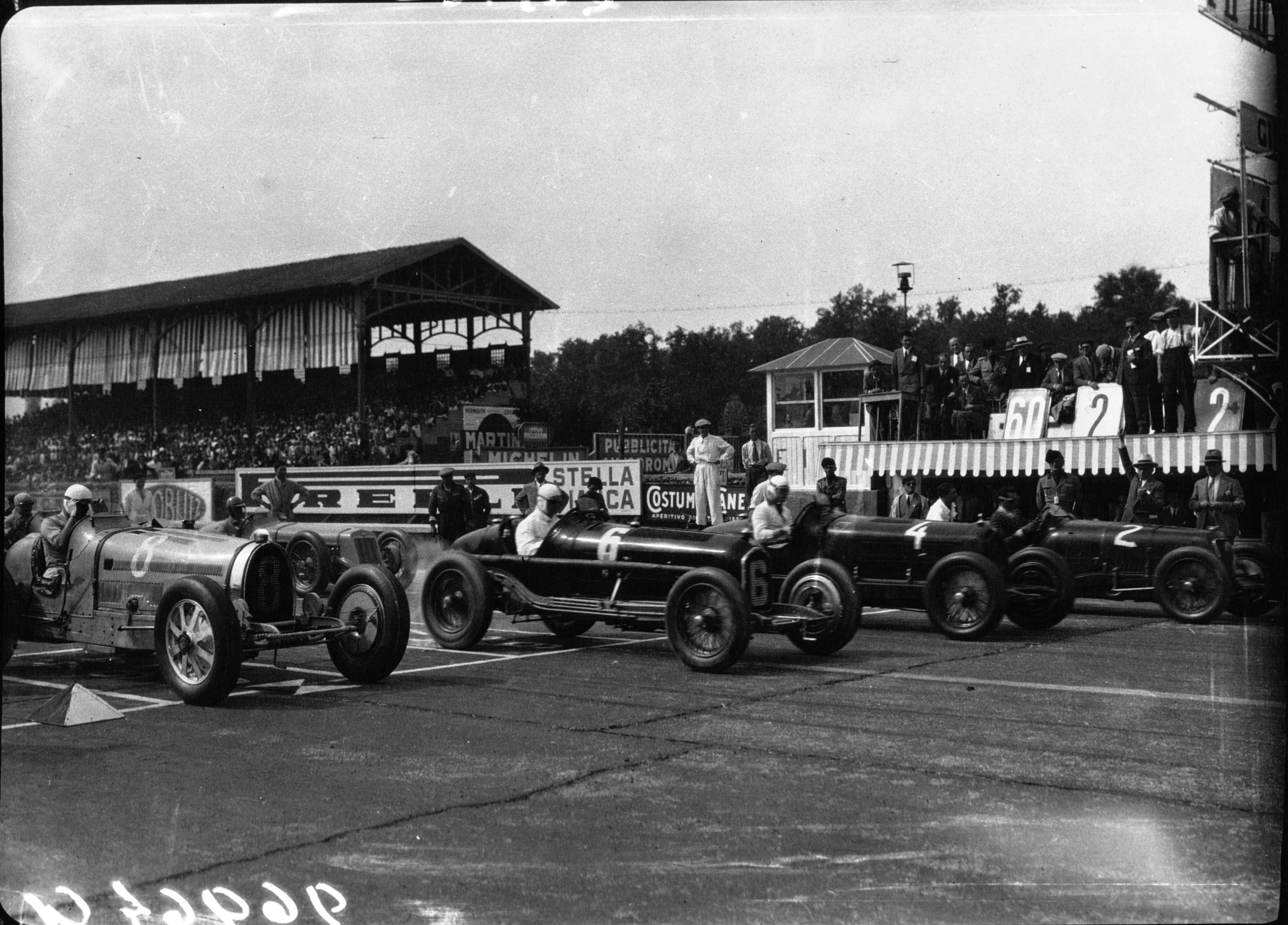
Front row of the Monza GP heat 1, left to right: Varzi, Caracciola, Brivio, Minozzi

As the cars formed on the grid for the final the Alfa Corse team was not there. The crowd voiced their disapproval in no uncertain terms and finally only the intervention of a party official to the Alfa Romeo managing director, to withdraw the protest, brought the cars out onto the track. Sportingly, Fagioli and Nuvolari hugged in front of the crowd, to settle their differences. Campari had to miss the final, however, as his car’s front axle had been fitted to Nuvolari’s car whose one had been bent in the heat two incident. Nuvolari took the lead at the start, hounded by Caracciola. Fagioli, starting from the second row, was soon falling back having lost second gear. Borzacchini came into the pits from third with fuel supply issues. Then on the second to last lap, Nuvolari got the same issue as Borzacchini. Fearing he was out of fuel he pitted only to be urged back out without refuelling by the team. Victory went to Caracciola with Fagioli’s crippled Maserati second and a disappointed Nuvolari in third. The Bugattis were never a factor. As a postscript, a full twelve days later, the Italian Sporting Commission finally reported that they had denied the Alfa Romeo protest treating it, in modern parlance, as a ‘racing incident’.

The last major race of the season was the inaugural Marseille Grand Prix, held at the underused Miramas oval. Alfa Romeo entered Nuvolari, while Maserati sent Fagioli and Ruggeri. Bugatti was not officially present, but Chiron and Varzi joined the ranks of Bugatti privateers alongside Dreyfus, Lehoux and Guy Moll. Alfa Romeo was supported by privateers Zehender, Félix and this year's Le Mans winner Raymond Sommer. Although Chiron vaulted to the lead from the third row on the grid, the lead soon became a battle between Nuvolari, Fagioli and Varzi with Lehoux, Gaupillat, Dreyfus and Zehender all less than ten seconds behind. Gradually the leaders were afflicted with issues: Varzi retired with damaged suspension, Lehoux with a broken oil-pipe and Dreyfus skidded off the track into a ditch. After 30 laps (150 km), Nuvolari, Fagioli and Gaupillat were only five seconds apart, while Sommer, a minute back, was the only other on the lead lap and barely able to match the frenetic pace. The harsh concrete surface was being very rough on tyres and suspensions and by the 250km mark there were only seven cars left running. When Nuvolari pitted on lap 48, he had a leisurely stop believing he now had a lap’s lead on the field. Sommer, however, was still on the same lap and pitting soon after only took on fuel and was able to get back out ahead of Nuvolari. When it finally dawned on the Alfa team the actual track positions they frantically encouraged Nuvolari to go faster. Not understanding, he pitted to get clarification and then tore off in hot pursuit. He set a new lap record of 199.7 km/h but at 60 laps (300 km) Sommer still had a 2-minute lead. He finally stopped for tyres on lap 68 but got out in time to keep the lead. Nuvolari was bearing down fast but the strain on his told and a tyre-blowout, five laps from the end, sealed the victory. Sommer won a thrilling race by 46 seconds and the exuberant partisan crowd surged onto the track preventing the other cars from running the full distance. Moll was third and Zehender fourth, both four laps down. It was a rare defeat for Nuvolari and the Tipo B this year and provided a suitably exciting finale to a very good season.

Alfa Romeo continued their dominant year into Sports Car racing as well. Their 8C-2300 MM was all-conquering – taking the top-7 places in the Mille Miglia in April, won by Nuvolari, Le Mans in June (Sommer & Luigi Chinetti) and July's Spa 24 hours (Brivio & Siena). While Alfa Corse generally focused on Grands Prix, Scuderia Ferrari entered most of the sports car races. Yet even such success, at the peak of racing prowess, could not save the company and in 1933 Alfa Romeo had to be bailed out by the Italian government. The Alfa Corse works team was abruptly wound up and its drivers became free agents again.

Motor-racing was now very popular across Europe, attracting huge crowds. Many could take a viewing location on the tracks without paying admission.

== Drivers' Championship final standings ==
| Pos | Driver | Team | ITA (Italy) | FRA (France) | GER (Germany) | Pts |
|---|---|---|---|---|---|---|
| 1 | (Italy) Tazio Nuvolari | Alfa Corse | 1 | 1 | 2 | 4 |
| 2 | (Italy) Baconin Borzacchini | Alfa Corse | **3** | 2 | 3 | 8 |
| 3 | (Germany) Rudolf Caracciola | Alfa Corse | 11 | 3 | **1** | 10 |
| 4 | (France) René Dreyfus | Private Entry | 5 | 5 | 4 | 14 |
| 5 | (Monaco) Louis Chiron | Automobiles Ettore Bugatti | Ret | 4 | Ret | 16 |
| = | (Italy) Luigi Fagioli | Officine Alfieri Maserati | 2 | | | 16 |
| 7 | (Italy) Giuseppe Campari | Alfa Corse | 4 | | | 18 |
| = | (French Algeria) Marcel Lehoux | Private Entry | Ret | Ret | Ret | 18 |
| 9 | (France) Albert Divo | Automobiles Ettore Bugatti | 6 | Ret | DNS | 19 |
| = | (Italy) Achille Varzi | Automobiles Ettore Bugatti | Ret | Ret | DNS | 19 |
| = | (Italy) Amedeo Ruggeri | Officine Alfieri Maserati | 8 | | Ret | 19 |
| 12 | (United Kingdom) William Grover-Williams | Private Entry | | 6 | | 20 |
| = | (Italy) Pietro Ghersi | Scuderia Ferrari | 7 | | | 20 |
| = | (Italy) Goffredo Zehender | Private Entry | | 7 | | 20 |
| = | (France) Pierre Félix | Private Entry | | 8 | | 20 |
| = | (Italy) Eugenio Siena | Scuderia Ferrari | 9 | | | 20 |
| = | (United Kingdom) Earl Howe | Private Entry | | 9 | | 20 |
| = | (Italy) Luigi Premoli | Private Entry | 10 | | | 20 |
| = | (Italy) Luigi Castelbarco | Private Entry | Ret | | | 20 |
| = | (France) Philippe Étancelin | Private Entry | | Ret | | 20 |
| = | (France) Max Fourny | Private Entry | | Ret | | 20 |
| = | (France) Jean Gaupillat | Private Entry | | **Ret** | | 20 |
| = | (France) Jean-Pierre Wimille | Private Entry | | Ret | | 20 |
| = | (Germany) Hans Lewy | PiLeSi Rennteam | | | Ret | 20 |
| = | (Germany) Paul Pietsch | PiLeSi Rennteam | | | Ret | 20 |
| Pos | Driver | Team | ITA (Italy) | FRA (France) | GER (Germany) | Pts |

Bold font indicates starting on pole position, while italics show the driver of the race's fastest lap. Source:

== Manufacturers' Championship final standings ==
| Pos | Manufacturer | ITA (Italy) | FRA (France) | GER (Germany) | Pts |
|---|---|---|---|---|---|
| 1 | (Italy) Alfa Romeo | 1 | 1 | 1 | 3 |
| 2 | (Italy) Maserati | 2 | | Ret | 15 |
| 3 | (France) Bugatti | 6 | 4 | Ret | 16 |
| Pos | Manufacturer | ITA (Italy) | FRA (France) | GER (Germany) | Pts |

Although there is no official indication that the Manufacturer’s and Driver’s championships were treated separately, it seems most likely that was the case. Source:

| Colour | Result | Points |
|---|---|---|
| Gold | Winner | 1 |
| Silver | 2nd place | 2 |
| Bronze | 3rd place | 3 |
| Green | 4th place | 4 |
| Blue | 5th place | 5 |
| Purple | Other finisher / Not classified / Retired | 6 |
| Black | Disqualified | 7 |
| White | Did not start (DNS) | 7 |
| Blank | Did not arrive | 7 |

== Results of the other major races ==
| Pos | Driver | Team | TUN (Tunisia) | MON (Monaco) | ROM (Italy) | TGF (Italy) | AVS (Germany) | CAS (Morocco) | EIF (Germany) | CCN (Italy) | CAC (Italy) | MSK (Czechoslovakia) | MNZ (Italy) | MRS (France) | Pts |
|---|---|---|---|---|---|---|---|---|---|---|---|---|---|---|---|
| | (Italy) Tazio Nuvolari | Alfa Corse; Scuderia Ferrari | | 1 | | 1 | | | | 1 | 1 | 3 | 3 | 2 | |
| | (Germany) Rudolf Caracciola | Private Entry; Alfa Corse | | 2 | | | 2 | | 1 | | 2 | | 1 | | |
| | (Italy) Luigi Fagioli | Officine Alfieri Maserati | Ret | 3 | 1 | Ret | Ret | | | | 5 | 2 | 2 | 6 | |
| | (French Algeria) Marcel Lehoux | Private Entry | 2 | 6 | | | | 1 | | | | Ret | Ret | Ret | |
| | (Monaco) Louis Chiron | Automobiles Ettore Bugatti | 6 | Ret | | 3 | DNS | | 5 | | 3 | 1 | 6 | Ret | |
| | (Germany) Manfred von Brauchitsch | Private Entry | | | | | 1 | | 3 | | Ret | | | | |
| | (Italy) Achille Varzi | Automobiles Ettore Bugatti | 1 | Ret | 4 | Ret [3] | DNS | | | 4 | Ret | Ret | 5 | Ret | |
| | (France) Raymond Sommer | Private Entry | | | | | | | | | | | | 1 | |
| | (Italy) Baconin Borzacchini | Alfa Corse; Scuderia Ferrari | | Ret | | 2 | | | | 2 | 6 | Ret | 4 | | |
| | (France) Philippe Étancelin | Private Entry | 3 | Ret | | | | 2 | | | | | | | |
| | (Italy) Piero Taruffi | Scuderia Ferrari | | | 2 | | | | | 5 | Ret | | 8 | | |
| | (France) René Dreyfus | Officine Alfieri Maserati | 7 | Ret | Ret | | Ret | | 2 | | | | | Ret | |
| | (Poland) Stanisław Czaykowski (France) | Private Entry | 5 | Ret | 5 | | | 3 | | | | | | | |
| | (Italy) Giuseppe Campari | Alfa Corse | | 10 | | | | | | 3 | | | DNQ | | |
| | (Germany) Heinrich-Joachim von Morgen | Deutsches Bugatti Team | Ret | | 3 | | Ret | | DNS † | | | | | | |
| | (Germany) Hans Stuber | Private Entry | | | | | 3 | | | | | | | | |
| | (French Algeria) Guy Moll | Private Entry | | | | | | Ret | | | | | | 3 | |
| | (Italy) Antonio Brivio | Scuderia Ferrari | | | | Ret [4] | | | | 7 | 4 | 4 | 7 | | |
| | (Germany) Hans Stuck | Private Entry | | | | | 4 | | 4 | | | | | | |
| | (Italy) Goffredo Zehender | Private Entry | | 5 | | | | Ret | | | | | | 4 | |
| | (Italy) Pietro Ghersi | Scuderia Ferrari | | | | 4 | | | | 6 | Ret | | | | |
| | (United Kingdom) Earl Howe | Private Entry | | 4 | | | | | | | 7 | | DNQ | | |
| | (Italy) Eugenio Siena | Scuderia Ferrari | 4 | | | | | | | | | DNS | | | |
| | (France) Benoît Falchetto | Private Entry | | | | | | 4 | | | | | | Ret | |
| | (France) Frédéric Toselli | Private Entry | | | | | | | | | | | | 4 | |
| | (France) Jean de Maleplane | Private Entry | 8 | | | | | 5 | | | | | Ret | Ret | |
| | (Italy) Amedeo Ruggeri | Officine Alfieri Maserati | | Ret | DNS | 5 | | | | | Ret [5] | | 9 | Ret [†] | |
| | (Germany) Ernst Kotte | Private Entry | | | | | 5 | | | | | | | | |
| | (France) Jean Gaupillat | Private Entry | | | | | | Ret | | | | | | 5 | |
| | (Italy) Giovanni Minozzi | Private Entry; Officine Alfieri Maserati | | | 6 | | | | | | | | 10 | | |
| | (France) Pierre Veyron | Private Entry | 10 | | | | | 6 | | | | | | | |
| | (Italy) Silvio Rondina | Private Entry | | | | 6 | | | | 11 | Ret | | | | |
| Pos | Driver | Team | TUN (Tunisia) | MON (Monaco) | ROM (Italy) | TGF (Italy) | AVS (Germany) | CAS (Morocco) | EIF (Germany) | CCN (Italy) | CAC (Italy) | MSK (Czechoslovakia) | MNZ (Italy) | MRS (France) | Pts |

Bold font indicates starting on pole position, while italics show the driver of the race's fastest lap.
Only those drivers with a best finish of 6th or better, or a fastest lap, are shown. Sources:

Citations
