= List of 1931 motorsport champions =

1931 motorsport champions
Previous: 1930	Next: 1932

This list of 1931 motorsport champions is a list of national or international auto racing series with a Championship decided by the points or positions earned by a driver from multiple races.

== Open wheel racing ==
Series	Driver	Season article
AIACR European Championship	(Italy) Ferdinando Minoia	1931 Grand Prix season
AAA National Championship	(United States) Louis Schneider	1931 AAA Championship Car season

== Motorcycle racing ==
=== Speedway ===
Series	Driver	Season article
Star Riders' Championship	(United States) Ray Tauser	1931 Star Riders' Championship

== See also ==
- List of motorsport championships
- Auto racing
