= List of 1934 motorsport champions =

1934 motorsport champions
Previous: 1933	Next: 1935

This list of 1934 motorsport champions is a list of national or international auto racing series with a Championship decided by the points or positions earned by a driver from multiple races.

== Open wheel racing ==
Series	Driver	Season article
AAA National Championship	(United States) Bill Cummings	1934 AAA Championship Car season

== Motorcycle racing ==
=== Speedway ===
Series	Driver	Season article
Star Riders' Championship	(United Kingdom) Jack Parker	1934 Star Riders' Championship

== See also ==
- List of motorsport championships
- Auto racing
