= List of 1933 motorsport champions =

1933 motorsport champions
Previous: 1932	Next: 1934

This list of 1933 motorsport champions is a list of national or international auto racing series with a Championship decided by the points or positions earned by a driver from multiple races.

== Open wheel racing ==
Series	Driver	Season article
AAA National Championship	(United States) Louis Meyer	1933 AAA Championship Car season

== Motorcycle racing ==
=== Speedway ===
Series	Driver	Season article
Star Riders' Championship	(United Kingdom) Tom Farndon	1933 Star Riders' Championship

== See also ==
- List of motorsport championships
- Auto racing
