= Jiří Lobkowicz (racing driver) =

Czech aristocrat and racing driver

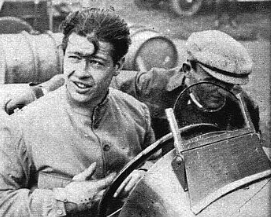
- With his Bugatti T51 in 1931
- Born: Georg Christian Prinz von Lobkowicz; 22 February 1907 Turnov, Bohemia, Austria-Hungary
- Died: 22 May 1932 (aged 25) Berlin, Weimar Republic

Jiří Kristián Lobkowicz (born Georg Christian Prinz von Lobkowicz; 22 February 1907 – 22 May 1932) was a Czech aristocrat and racing driver who took part in Grand Prix motor racing in the 1930s.

== Early life and family ==
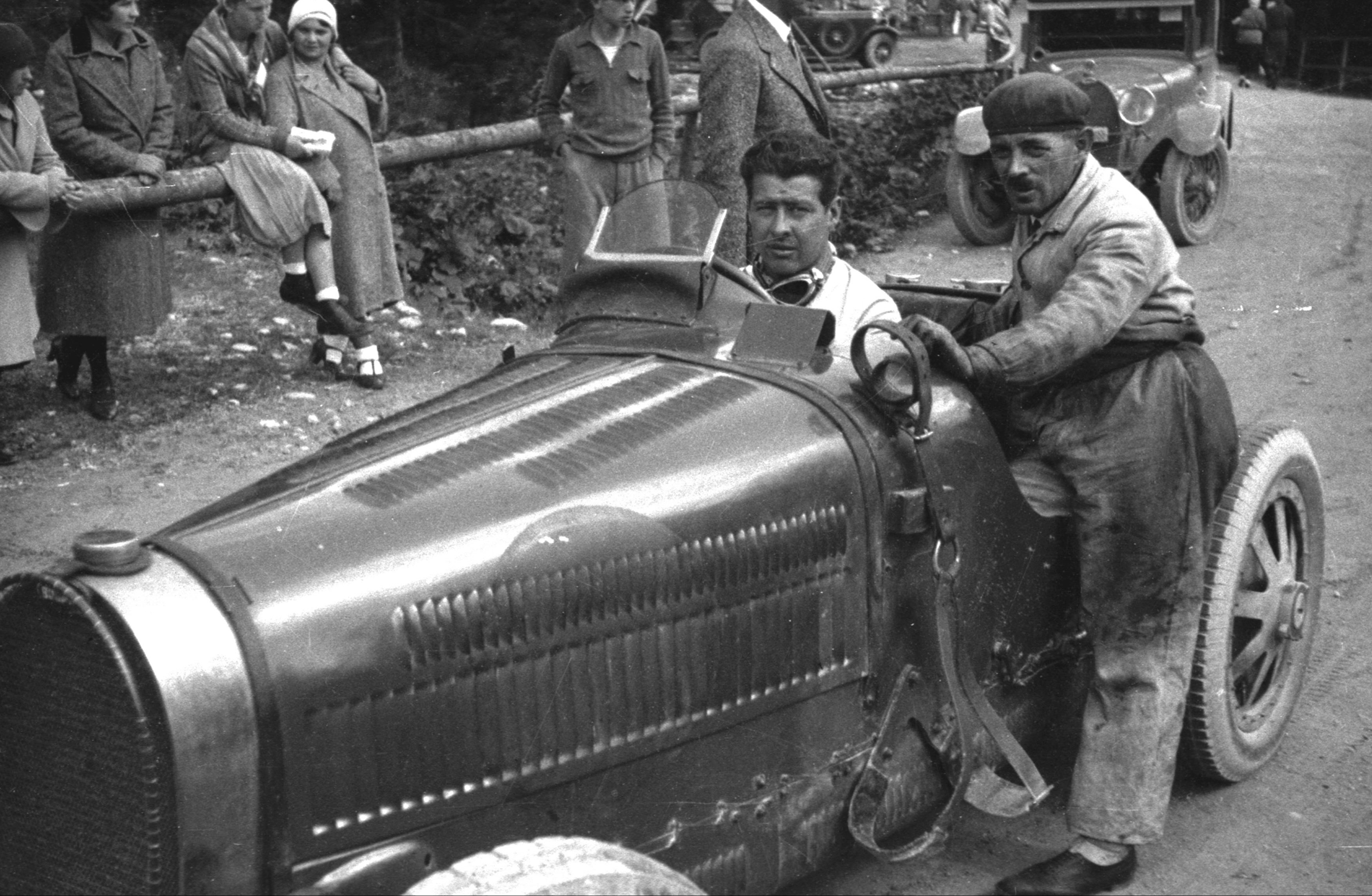
At the International Tatra Rally in 1931

Lobkowicz was a member of the noble Lobkowicz family. He was eldest son of Friedrich, and grandson of Georg Christian, Prince of Lobkowicz. His mother Princess Josefine appeared at the tennis Wimbledon Championships in 1928.

== Motor racing career ==
Lobkowicz' first race came near the family home at Mělník in an Austro-Daimler, but it ended after barely a kilometre, when he shifted into reverse rather than a higher gear; he borrowed a pushbike to complete the distance. He soon moved up to a Bugatti Type 37 and then a Grand Prix-standard Bugatti Type 35C, originally racing under the pseudonym Hýta (after a children's book character) so his family would not find out.

It was in the 35C in which Lobkowicz made his Grande Epreuve debut, taking part in the 1930 race at the Masaryk Circuit. An early magneto failure (after a rapid 5 laps) required a time-consuming repair, and he was flagged off after completing 14 of the scheduled 17 laps. For the following year's race, by now racing under the Lobkowicz name and in a Bugatti Type 51, he managed to complete the full race distance, being classified 4th and last of the finishers, ahead of two other non-classified runners.

Lobkowicz had a number of successes in hillclimbing, including a 2 litre class win at the Königsaal event in 1931, finishing third overall, only beaten by Hans Stuck (in a 7.1 litre Mercedes-Benz) and Hermann zu Leiningen, and also took an overall win at the Riesengebirg event.

== Death ==
Lobkowicz undertook his first significant race outside Czechoslovakia at the 1932 Avusrennen, in a new 5-litre Bugatti Type 54. Having completed just one racing lap, Lobkowicz lost control when being overtaken by Hans Lewy, skidded to the top of the track, and was thrown out, with fatal results.
