= Thillois =

- Commune
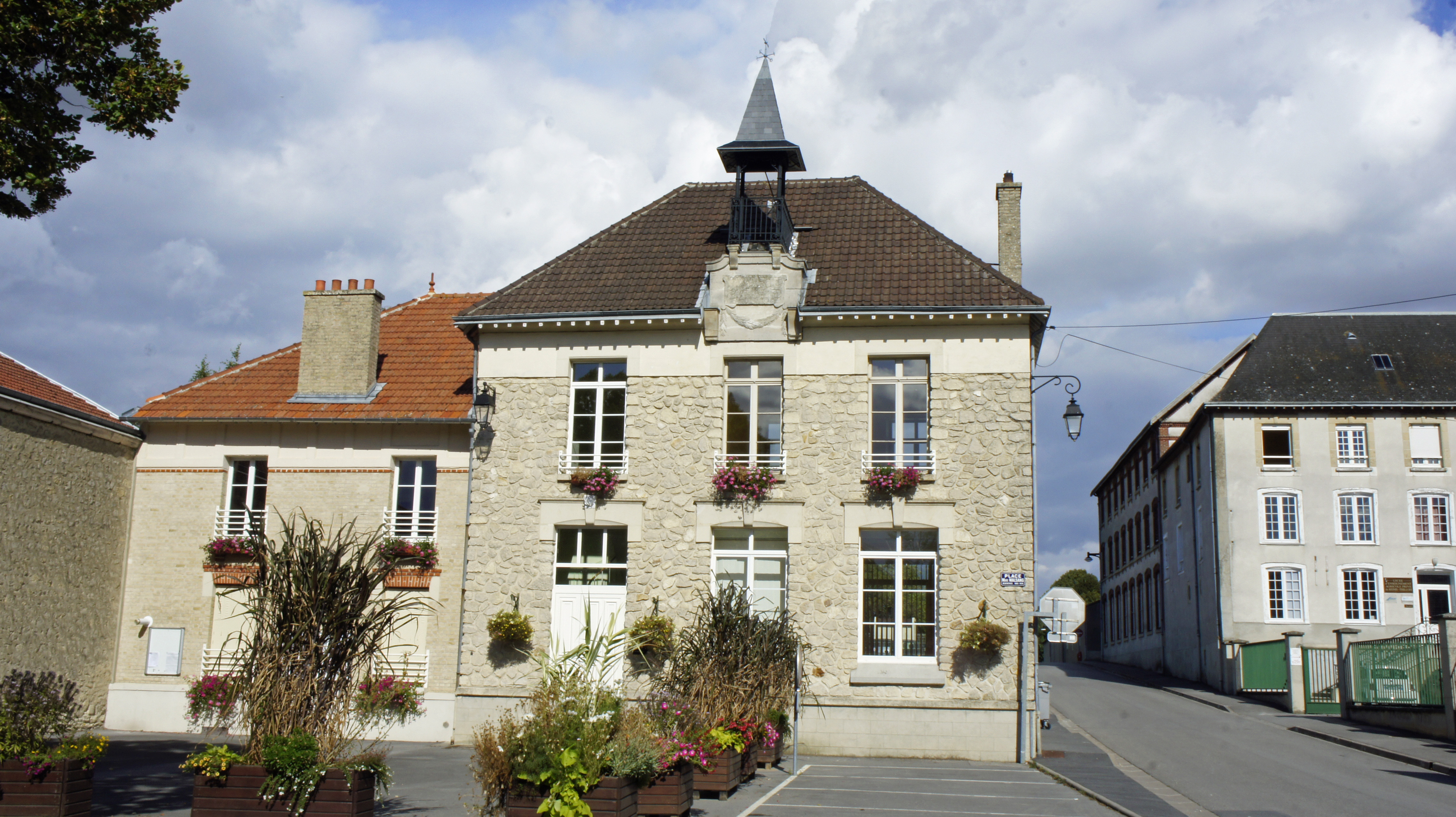
- The town hall in Thillois
- Location of Thillois
- Location within France Location within Grand Est
- Coordinates: 49°15′24″N 3°57′18″E
- Country: France
- Region: Grand Est
- Department: Marne
- Arrondissement: Reims
- Canton: Fismes-Montagne de Reims
- Intercommunality: CU Grand Reims

Government
  - Mayor (2020–2026): Denis Poncelet
- Area^{1}: 6.35 km^{2} (2.45 sq mi)
- Elevation: 89 m (292 ft)
- Population (2023): 514
  - Density: 80.9/km^{2} (210/sq mi)
- Time zone: UTC+01:00 (CET)
  - Summer (DST): UTC+02:00 (CEST)
- INSEE/Postal code: 51569 /51370
- ^{1} French Land Register data, which excludes lakes, ponds, glaciers > 1 km^{2} (0.386 sq mi or 247 acres) and river estuaries.

Thillois (French pronunciation: [tilwa]) is a commune in the Marne department in north-eastern France.

== See also ==
- Communes of the Marne department
