= Hans Lewy (racing driver) =

German racing driver and Holocaust victim (1896–1942)

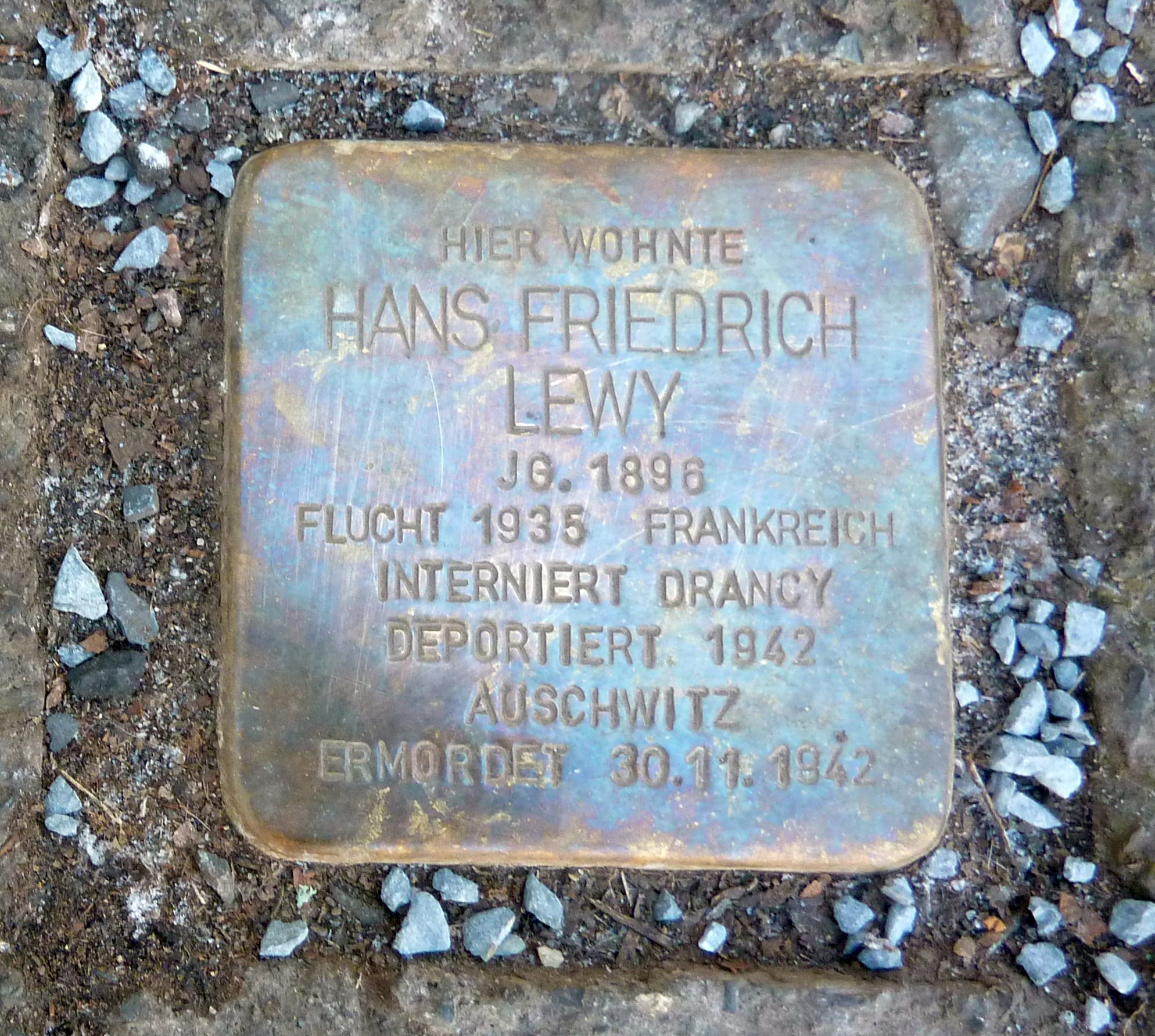
- The stolperstein in honour of Lewy, outside his address at Comeniusstraße in Dresden
- Born: Hans Friedrich Lewy; 13 October 1896 Dresden, Germany
- Died: 30 November 1942 (aged 46) Auschwitz, Poland

Hans Friedrich Lewy (13 October 1896 – 30 November 1942) was a German-Jewish Grand Prix driver active from 1926 to 1933.

== Career ==
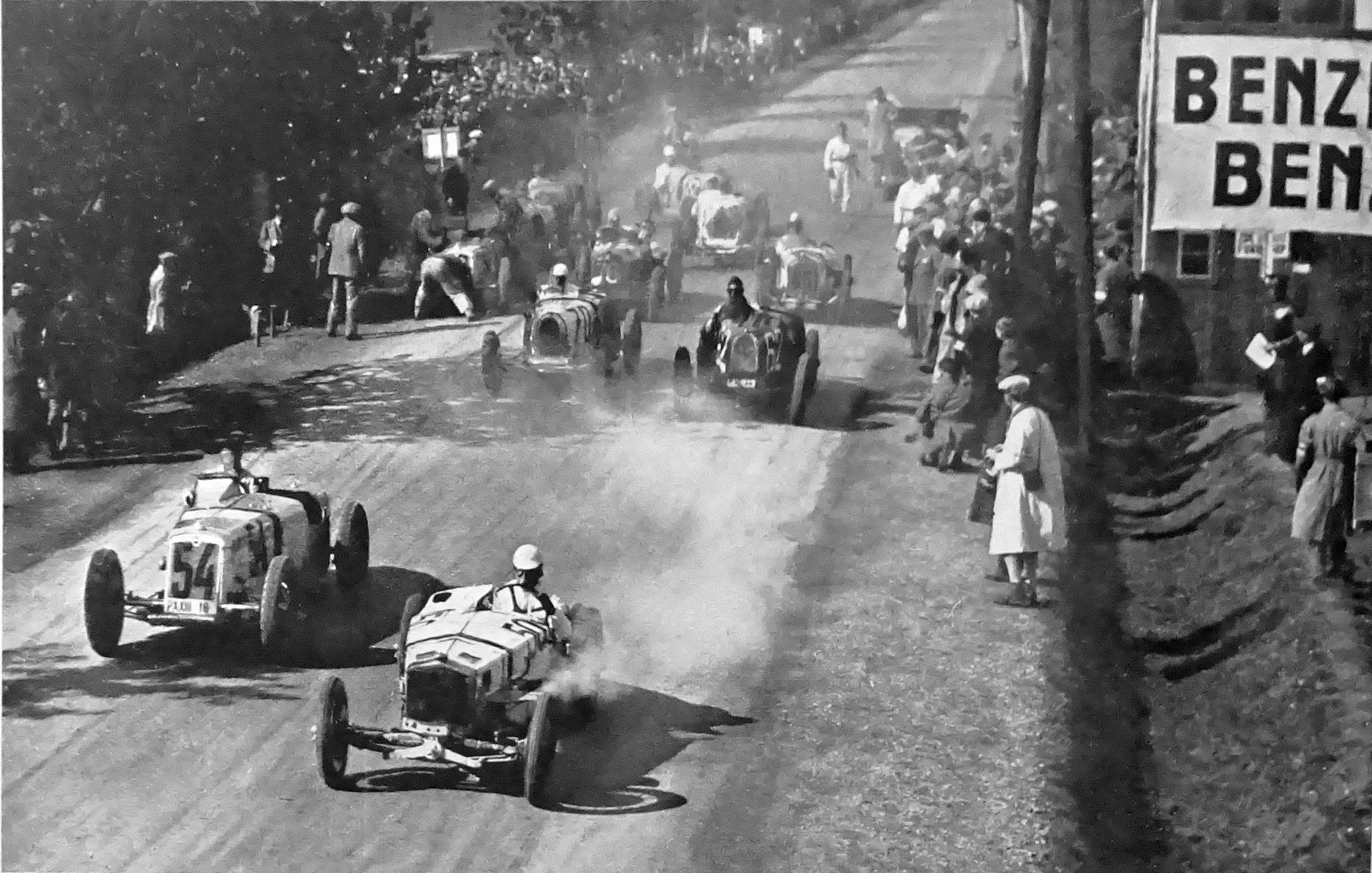
Start of the voiturette section of the 1931 Masaryk Grand Prix; Lewy is in car no. 70, on the left of the second row

Lewy was the owner of a cigarette factory in Dresden who started racing in 1926 in a Bugatti Type 40 sportscar; he was notable for wearing a monocle while racing. In 1931, he bought a Bugatti Type 37A for voiturette racing, and started in the voiturette section of the 1931 Masaryk Grand Prix, although he was an early retirement. He won the voiturette race supporting the 1931 Avusrennen, being one of only two finishers.

In 1932 he stepped up to a Bugatti Type 51, and won a race at the Erbenheim airfield, inheriting the lead after Paul Pietsch in a Bugatti Type 35B retired. Lewy and Pietsch bonded over discussions in practice, and decided to form a team, which soon included Hans Simons, who had a Bugatti Type 37; the combination took the PiLeSi name from their surnames. The team had a run of successes, Lewy winning the a hillclimb event at Lückendorf and heading up a 1–2 (ahead of Pietsch) at a similar event at Würgau. He also finished 5th at the European Mountain Championship event at Kesselberg, just behind Pietsch.

The team took part in two Grandes Epreuves in 1932, namely the 1932 Avusrennen and the 1932 German Grand Prix. Lewy was involved in an horrendous accident at the Avusrenne, when Jiři Lobkowicz, driving his unwieldy and barely tested 5 litre Bugatti Type 54 for the first time, lost control as Lewy overtook him, and spun; the cars collided, breaking one of Lewy's wheels, and Lobkowicz was killed as his car rolled over. Lewy escaped unharmed. At the Grand Prix, Lewy was running in 9th place after four laps, but pulled into the pits for a relief driver, as he was suffering from stomach cramps; Pietsch, who had retired on the first lap, stepped in, rose to 4th place within a lap, but crashed on the next.

== End of career and death ==
The PiLeSi team wound up at the end of 1933, after Lewy and Pietsch were beaten into second and third by Hans Stuber at the Hohnstein mountain climb in September. After 1933 the Nazi government refused racing licences to Jewish drivers, forcing Lewy to quit the sport. He left Germany, originally planning to go to the United States, but instead went to France. In 1942 he was interned at Drancy and sent to Auschwitz, where he was killed in November.
