= 1932 German Grand Prix =

- Race 3 of 3 in the 1932 European Championship

Race details
- Date: 17 July 1932
- Official name: VI Großer Preis von Deutschland
- Location: Nürburgring; Nürburg, Germany
- Course: Permanent racing facility
- Course length: 22.811 km (14.174 miles)
- Distance: 25 laps, 570.270 km (354.349 miles)

Pole position
Driver	(Germany) Rudolf Caracciola	Alfa Romeo
- Grid positions set by ballot

Fastest lap
Driver	(Italy) Tazio Nuvolari	Alfa Romeo
- Time: 10:49.4

Podium
First	(Germany) Rudolf Caracciola	Alfa Romeo
Second	(Italy) Tazio Nuvolari	Alfa Romeo
Third	(Italy) Baconin Borzacchini	Alfa Romeo

The 1932 German Grand Prix was a Grand Prix motor race held at the Nürburgring on 17 July 1932.

== Classification ==
Pos	No	Driver	Team	Car	Laps	Time/Retired	Grid	Points
1	2	(Germany) Rudolf Caracciola	Alfa Corse	Alfa Romeo Tipo B	25	4:47:22.8	1	1
2	10	(Italy) Tazio Nuvolari	Alfa Corse	Alfa Romeo Tipo B	25	+31.0	4	2
3	12	(Italy) Baconin Borzacchini	Alfa Corse	Alfa Romeo Tipo B	25	+7:10.2	5	3
4	32	(France) René Dreyfus	Private entry	Bugatti T51	25	+13:42.2	7	4
Ret	18	(Monaco) Louis Chiron	Ettore Bugatti	Bugatti T51	6	Rear axle	9	7
Ret	16	(Germany) Hans Lewy	Pilesi Racing Team	Bugatti T51	5	Accident	3	7
Ret	16	(Germany) Paul Pietsch	Pilesi Racing Team	Bugatti T51	5	Accident	3	n/a
Ret	8	(France) Marcel Lehoux	Private entry	Bugatti T51	3	Rear axle	8	7
Ret	26	(Italy) Àmedeo Ruggeri	Private entry	Maserati 26M	1	Engine	6	7
Ret	30	(Germany) Paul Pietsch	Pilesi Racing Team	Bugatti T51	0	Radiator	2	7

Grand Prix Race
Previous race: 1932 French Grand Prix	1932 Grand Prix season Grandes Épreuves	Next race: 1933 Monaco Grand Prix
Previous race: 1931 German Grand Prix	German Grand Prix	Next race: 1934 German Grand Prix
