= 1933 Nice Grand Prix =

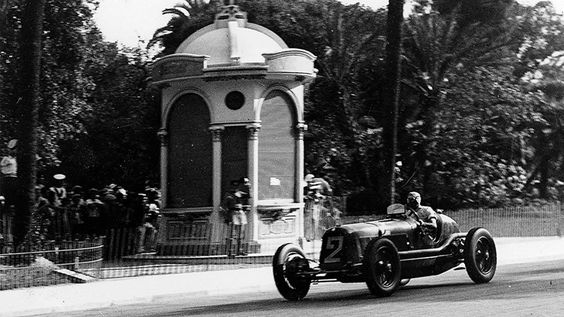
- Tazio Nuvolari towards win in Maserati 8CM

Race details
- Date: 6 August 1933
- Official name: II Grand Prix de Nice
- Location: Nice, France
- Course: Street circuit
- Course length: 3.214 km (1.997 miles)
- Distance: 95 laps, 305.33 km (189.72 miles)
- Weather: Sunny, dry

Pole position
Driver	(Italy) Tazio Nuvolari	Maserati

Fastest lap
Driver	(Italy) Tazio Nuvolari	Maserati
- Time: 1:47.0 (108.1 km/h)

Podium
First	(Italy) Tazio Nuvolari	Maserati
Second	(France) René Dreyfus	Bugatti
Third	(France) Guy Moll	Alfa Romeo

The 1933 Nice Grand Prix (officially the II Grand Prix de Nice) was a Grand Prix motor race held at Nice on Sunday, 6 August 1933.

Compared to the relatively small 1932 Nice Circuit Race the 1933 race was a serious Grand Prix with almost all the best known drivers of the time in competition. The street course followed the best known roads in the famous holiday resort, up and down the Promenade des Anglaise (with a 1.4 km straight allowing speeds up to 200 km/h to be reached), the Avenue Verdun, around the Place Masséna, Avenue des Phocéens and Quai des Etats Unis. In common with several other Grand Prix in 1933 the grid starting positions were decided according to practice times. Tazio Nuvolari had his third consecutive Grand Prix win.

== Classification ==
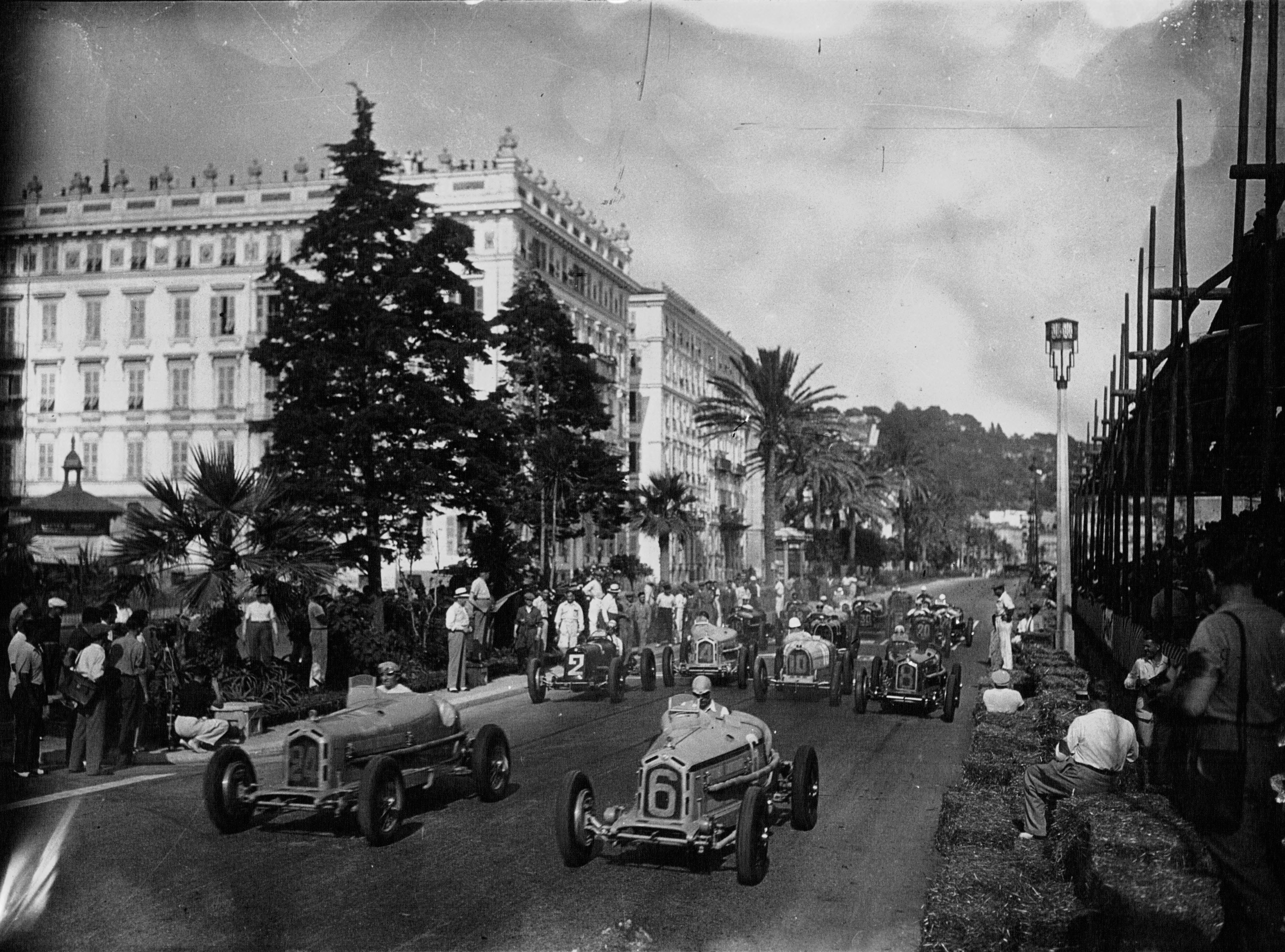
Start of the race

Pos	No	Driver	Car	Laps	Time/Retired	Grid
1	2	(Italy) Tazio Nuvolari	Maserati 8CM	95	2:56:17.6 (103.92 km/h)	1
2	14	(France) René Dreyfus	Bugatti T51	95	2:57:47.1	9
3	8	(France) Guy Moll	Alfa Romeo Monza	94	+1 lap	8
4	16	(Italy) Luigi Fagioli	Alfa Romeo Monza	93	+2 laps	6
5	10	(France) Marcel Lehoux	Bugatti T51	92	+3 laps	5
6	30	(United Kingdom) Brian Lewis	Alfa Romeo Monza	92	+3 laps	12
7	32	(France) Pierre Félix	Alfa Romeo Monza	91	+4 laps	14
8	20	(Italy) Giuseppe Campari	Maserati 4CM 2000	91	+4 laps	10
Ret	6	(France) Jean-Pierre Wimille	Alfa Romeo Monza	80	Brake rod	3
Ret	24	(France) Philippe Étancelin	Alfa Romeo Monza	55	Brake rod	2
Ret	18	(Italy) Giovanni Minozzi	Maserati 8C	43		11
Ret	28	(Italy) Goffredo Zehender	Maserati 8CM	40	Overheating	15
Ret	12	(United Kingdom) Earl Howe	Bugatti T51	15	Carburetor control	16
Ret	22	(Italy) Achille Varzi	Bugatti T51	15	Brakes	7
Ret	4	(France) Raymond Sommer	Alfa Romeo Monza	15	Rocker arm	4
Ret	26	(Austria) Charles Jellen	Alfa Romeo Monza	5	Fuel pipe	13
DNA		(Hungary) László Hartmann	Bugatti T35B			
DNA		(Italy) Clemente Biondetti	MB Speciale			

== Notes ==
Exact number of laps completed by retired drivers is not known for certain, values shown above are taken from available sources

Grand Prix Race
1933 Grand Prix season
Previous race: 1932 Nice Circuit Race	Nice Grand Prix	Next race: 1934 Nice Grand Prix
