= 1933 Tunis Grand Prix =

Automobile race in Tunis, Tunisia

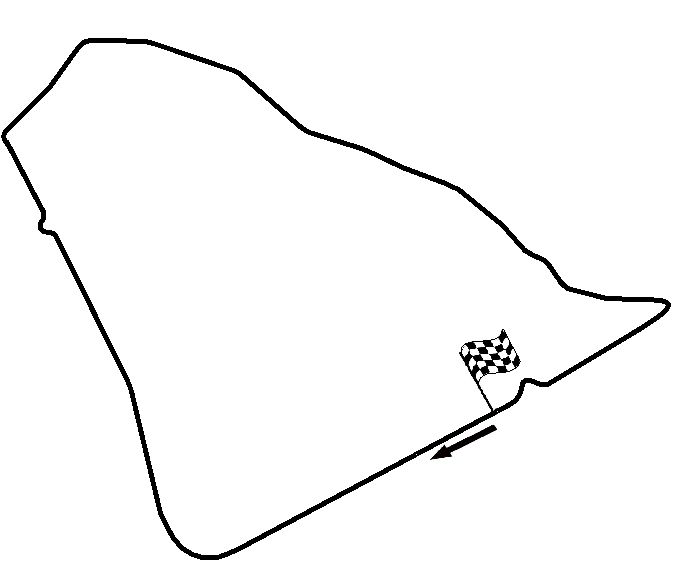

Race details
- Date: 26 March 1933
- Official name: V Grand Prix de Tunisie
- Location: Carthage Street Circuit; Tunis, French protectorate of Tunisia
- Course: Street circuit
- Course length: 12.714 km (7.9 miles)
- Distance: 37 laps, 470.4 km (292.3 miles)
- Weather: Initially dry, with thunder and rain later

Pole position
Driver	(France) Frédéric Toselli	Bugatti
- Grid positions set by car number

Fastest lap
Driver	(Italy) Tazio Nuvolari	Alfa Romeo
- Time: 5:05 on lap 7

Podium
First	(Italy) Tazio Nuvolari	Alfa Romeo
Second	(Italy) Baconin Borzacchini	Alfa Romeo
Third	(Italy) Goffredo Zehender	Maserati

The 1933 Tunis Grand Prix was a Grand Prix motor race held at the Carthage Street Circuit in Tunis, the capital of colonial Tunisia, on 26 March 1933. Tazio Nuvolari won the 37 lap race, driving for Scuderia Ferrari, Alfa Romeo's works team, while his teammate, Baconin Borzacchini, finished second. Third place was taken by the privateer Maserati of Goffredo Zehender.

== Entries ==
No	Driver	Entrant	Constructor	Chassis	Engine
2	(France) Frédéric Toselli	Private entry	Bugatti	Bugatti T51(A)	2.3 L8
4	(France) Guy Moll	Private entry	Bugatti	Bugatti T35C	2.0 L8
6	(Hungary) László Hartmann	Private entry	Bugatti	Bugatti T51	2.3 L8
8	(Italy) Baconin Borzacchini	Scuderia Ferrari	Alfa Romeo	Alfa Romeo Monza	2.3 L8
12	(France) Robert Brunet	Private entry	Bugatti	Bugatti T51	2.3 L8
14	(Germany) Paul Pietsch	Private entry	Alfa Romeo	Alfa Romeo Monza	2.3 L8
16	(Poland) Stanisłas Czaykowski	Private entry	Bugatti	Bugatti T51	2.3 L8
18	(France) Louis Braillard	Private entry	Bugatti	Bugatti T35B	2.3 L8
20	(France) Jean Gaupillat	Private entry	Bugatti	Bugatti T51	2.3 L8
22	(Italy) Luigi Premoli	Private entry	PBM	PBM	3.0 L8
24	(France) Raymond Sommer	Private entry	Maserati	Maserati 8CM	3.0 L8
26	(France) Benoît Falchetto	Private entry	Bugatti	Bugatti T35B	2.3 L8
28	(Italy) Tazio Nuvolari	Scuderia Ferrari	Alfa Romeo	Alfa Romeo Monza	2.6 L8
30	(Switzerland) Julio Villars	Equipe Villars-Waldthausen	Alfa Romeo	Alfa Romeo Monza	2.3 L8
32	(Switzerland) Horst von Waldthausen	Equipe Villars-Waldthausen	Alfa Romeo	Alfa Romeo Monza	2.3 L8
34	(Italy) Goffredo Zehender	Private entry	Maserati	Maserati 8C 2800	2.8 L8
36	(France) Philippe Étancelin	Private entry	Alfa Romeo	Alfa Romeo Monza	2.3 L8
38	(Italy) Achille Varzi	Automobiles E. Bugatti	Bugatti	Bugatti T51	2.3 L8
40	(France) Marcel Lehoux	Private entry	Bugatti	Bugatti T51	2.3 L8
42	(Italy) Luigi Fagioli	Officine A. Maserati	Maserati	Maserati 8C 3000	3.0 L8
44	(Chile) Juan Zanelli	Private entry	Alfa Romeo	Alfa Romeo Monza	2.3 L8
?	(France) Pierre Veyron	Automobiles E. Bugatti	Bugatti	Bugatti T51	2.3 L8
?	Louis Joly	Private entry	Bugatti/Maserati	?	?
?	(Italy) Pietro Ghersi	Private entry	Bugatti	?	?

== Starting grid ==
Grid positions were allocated in numerical order.

Starting grid — 1933 Tunis Grand Prix
		(France) Toselli; Bugatti
	(France) Moll; Bugatti	(France) Toselli; Bugatti
		(Italy) Borzacchini; Alfa Romeo
	(Chile) Zanelli; Alfa Romeo	(Italy) Borzacchini; Alfa Romeo
(France) Brunet; Bugatti	(Chile) Zanelli; Alfa Romeo	
		(Germany) Pietsch; Alfa Romeo
	(Poland) Czaykowski; Bugatti	(Germany) Pietsch; Alfa Romeo
(France) Braillard; Bugatti	(Poland) Czaykowski; Bugatti	
		(France) Gaupillat; Bugatti
	(Italy) Premoli; PBM	(France) Gaupillat; Bugatti
(France) Sommer; Maserati	(Italy) Premoli; PBM	
		(France) Falchetto; Bugatti
	(Italy) Nuvolari; Alfa Romeo	(France) Falchetto; Bugatti
(Switzerland) Villars; Alfa Romeo	(Italy) Nuvolari; Alfa Romeo	
		(Switzerland) Waldthausen; Alfa Romeo
	(Italy) Zehender; Maserati	(Switzerland) Waldthausen; Alfa Romeo
(France) Étancelin; Alfa Romeo	(Italy) Zehender; Maserati	
		(Italy) Varzi; Bugatti
	(France) Lehoux; Bugatti	(Italy) Varzi; Bugatti
(Italy) Fagioli; Maserati	(France) Lehoux; Bugatti	

== Classification ==
=== Race ===
Pos	No	Driver	Car	Laps	Time/Retired	Grid
1	28	(Italy) Tazio Nuvolari	Alfa Romeo Monza	37	3:29:15.4	13
2	8	(Italy) Baconin Borzacchini	Alfa Romeo Monza	37	+0.2	3
3	34	(Italy) Goffredo Zehender	Maserati 8C 2800	37	+11:58.0	16
4	32	(Switzerland) Horst von Waldthausen	Alfa Romeo Monza	37	+12:01.0	15
5	26	(France) Benoît Falchetto	Bugatti T35B	37	+12:18.6	12
6	2	(France) Frédéric Toselli	Bugatti T51(A)	37	+15:54.2	1
7	14	(Germany) Paul Pietsch	Alfa Romeo Monza	37	+17:17.2	6
8	44	(Chile) Juan Zanelli	Alfa Romeo Monza	37	+19:07.2	4
9	4	(France) Guy Moll	Bugatti T35C	36	Ran out of fuel	2
10	30	(Switzerland) Julio Villars	Alfa Romeo Monza	36	+1 lap	14
11	18	(France) Louis Braillard	Bugatti T35B	35	+2 laps	8
Ret	36	(France) Philippe Étancelin	Alfa Romeo Monza	21	Rear axle	17
Ret	20	(France) Jean Gaupillat	Bugatti T51	15	Oil pressure	9
Ret	12	(France) Robert Brunet	Bugatti T51	14	Oil pressure	5
Ret	42	(Italy) Luigi Fagioli	Maserati 8C 3000	12	Magneto drive	20
Ret	38	(Italy) Achille Varzi	Bugatti T51	11	Drive shaft	18
Ret	22	(Italy) Luigi Premoli	PBM	8	Transmission	10
Ret	16	(Poland) Stanisłas Czaykowski	Bugatti T51	6	Oil pump drive	7
Ret	40	(France) Marcel Lehoux	Bugatti T51	6	Piston	19
Ret	24	(France) Raymond Sommer	Maserati 8CM	5	Magneto drive	11
DNS	6	(Hungary) László Hartmann	Bugatti T51		Did not start	
DNA	?	(France) Pierre Veyron	Bugatti T51		Did not arrive	
DNA	?	Louis Joly	Bugatti/Maserati		Did not arrive	
DNA	?	(Italy) Pietro Ghersi	Bugatti		Did not arrive	

Grand Prix Race
1933 Grand Prix season
Previous race: 1932 Tunis Grand Prix	Tunis Grand Prix	Next race: 1935 Tunis Grand Prix
