= 1933 Belgian Grand Prix =

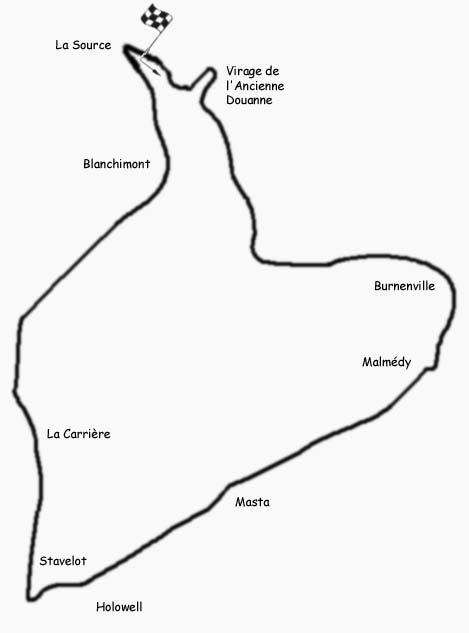

Race details
- Date: 9 July 1933
- Official name: IV Grand Prix de Belgique
- Location: Spa-Francorchamps; Spa, Belgium
- Course: Road course
- Course length: 14.86 km (9.236 miles)
- Distance: 40 laps, 596.6 km (370.7 miles)
- Weather: Dry, overcast

Pole position
Driver	(Monaco) Louis Chiron	Alfa Romeo
- Grid positions set by ballot

Fastest lap
Driver	(Italy) Tazio Nuvolari	Maserati
- Time: 6:01 on lap 13

Podium
First	(Italy) Tazio Nuvolari	Maserati
Second	(Italy) Achille Varzi	Bugatti
Third	(France) René Dreyfus	Bugatti

The 1933 Belgian Grand Prix (formally the IV Grand Prix de Belgique) was a Grand Prix motor race held at Spa-Francorchamps on 9 July 1933. The 40-lap race was won by Tazio Nuvolari, of Scuderia Ferrari, driving a Maserati. Second and third were taken by the works Bugatti drivers Achille Varzi and René Dreyfus.

== Background ==
The works Bugatti team, who had been absent from the previous Grande Épreuve, the French Grand Prix, returned to action, bringing their new 2.8 L Bugatti T59 to the Belgian Grand Prix. The car, which was originally intended to make its debut at Montlhéry, was driven by the team's most experienced driver, Achille Varzi. However, Varzi experienced issues with the T59 during practice, and therefore decided to revert to the older 2.3 L T51 model, which his teammates were still using.

Tazio Nuvolari, part of Scuderia Ferrari, the works Alfa Romeo team, was unhappy at how his team had been preparing his car, and so decided to try out the Maserati 8CM s/n 3005 as well as his usual Alfa Romeo Monza during practice. The Maserati had been driven a week earlier at the Marne Grand Prix by Giuseppe Campari, whose injuries incurred at that race rendered him unfit to race at Spa. It was therefore available to be raced and was lent to Nuvolari, who was still under contract for the Scuderia, as part of a deal reached between Enzo Ferrari and Ernesto Maserati. Nuvolari ultimately decided to use the 8CM, once certain modifications had been made. Despite technically being entered by Scuderia Ferrari, Nuvolari's Maserati did not feature the team's prancing horse logo.

== Report ==
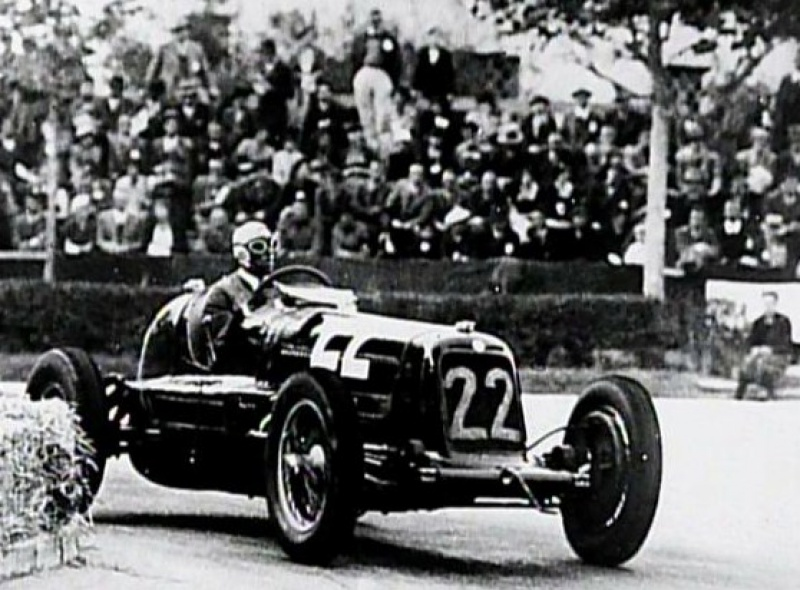
This is Tazio Nuvolari in this race, driving his new Maserati 8CM to victory.

Despite starting from the back row of the grid, Nuvolari had taken the lead of the race by the end of the first lap, with his nearest rivals being his teammate Borzacchini, polesitter Chiron in a privateer Alfa Romeo, and the works Bugattis of Varzi and Dreyfus. By the 100 km mark, Nuvolari had opened up a 17-second lead over Borzacchini and Chiron, with Varzi, in fourth position, a further 45 seconds back. Lehoux was 8 seconds behind Varzi, and around 25 seconds ahead of Zehender and Dreyfus. Zehender, the only works Maserati competing in the Grand Prix, was the first casualty of the race, retiring due to transmission problems after ten laps. The Swiss driver "Marko" (Edgard Markiewicz), who had been at the back of the field throughout, was the second to retire when he crashed his car.

By the 200 km mark, Nuvolari's lead had increased to 36 seconds over Borzacchini, while Chiron was a further 14 seconds back. Nuvolari's lead over Varzi and Lehoux was in excess of two minutes, and the remainder of the field were more than three minutes behind the race leader. When Nuvolari took to the pits for fuel and tyres, Chiron, who had already overtaken Borzacchini, took the lead of the race, while Borzacchini and Varzi were promoted to second and third, respectively, with Nuvolari down to fourth place. Chiron's lead at the 300 km mark was over two minutes to Borzacchini, while Nuvolari, up to third, was a further minute back, having himself opened up a minute-and-a-half lead to Varzi in fourth. Chiron's lead was relatively short-lived, however, as he was forced to retire when his differential broke. The Frenchman Moll retired on the same lap as Chiron, after suffering problems with either his gearbox or his clutch. Two laps later, Nuvolari was back in the lead when a connecting rod broke in the engine of the erstwhile race-leader, Nuvolari's teammate, Borzacchini.Alfa Romeo Monza.

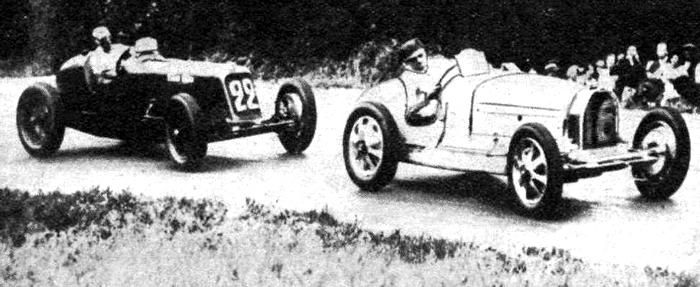
Tazio Nuvolari chasing William Grover-Williams who had spark plug problems.

Nuvolari's lead at the 400 km mark was up to 1:45 over Varzi, with Varzi's teammate Dreyfus a further minute and a half behind. Lehoux was fourth, comfortably ahead of fifth-placed Siena, Nuvolari's only remaining teammate left in the race. After 500 km, Nuvolari had extended his lead over Varzi to 2:14. As Varzi had a considerable time advantage over Dreyfus, he was able to make a tyre change towards the end of the race, and rejoin proceedings still in second place, albeit only just. Nuvolari took the victory with a gap of nearly four minutes to Varzi, while Dreyfus finished three seconds behind his teammate in third place. Lehoux, who had lost third gear, took fourth, ahead of Siena, the first Alfa to finish, in fifth place. Grover-Williams in the final Bugatti, who had experienced considerable problems with spark plugs, was a lap down in sixth, while Sommer was the last to finish in seventh, five laps behind the leaders, having had fuel feed issues throughout the race.

== Entries ==
No	Driver	Entrant	Constructor	Chassis	Engine
2	(Monaco) Louis Chiron	Scuderia CC	Alfa Romeo	Alfa Romeo Monza	2.3 L8
4	(France) Marcel Lehoux	Private entry	Bugatti	Bugatti T51	3.0 L8
6	(France) Guy Moll	Private entry	Alfa Romeo	Alfa Romeo Monza	2.3 L8
8	(France) Raymond Sommer	Private entry	Alfa Romeo	Alfa Romeo Monza	2.6 L8
10	(Italy) Baconin Borzacchini	Scuderia Ferrari	Alfa Romeo	Alfa Romeo Monza	2.6 L8
12	(Italy) Eugenio Siena	Scuderia Ferrari	Alfa Romeo	Alfa Romeo Monza	2.6 L8
14	(Italy) Achille Varzi	Automobiles E. Bugatti	Bugatti	Bugatti T59; Bugatti T51	2.8 L8; 2.3 L8
16	(United Kingdom) William Grover-Williams	Automobiles E. Bugatti	Bugatti	Bugatti T51	2.3 L8
18	(France) René Dreyfus	Automobiles E. Bugatti	Bugatti	Bugatti T51	2.3 L8
20	(Switzerland) "Marko"	Edgard Markiewicz	Bugatti	Bugatti T35B	2.3 L8
22	(Italy) Tazio Nuvolari	Scuderia Ferrari	Maserati	Maserati 8CM	3.0 L8
24	(Italy) Goffredo Zehender	Officine A. Maserati	Maserati	Maserati 8CM	3.0 L8
?	(Italy) Giuseppe Campari	Officine A. Maserati	Maserati	Maserati 8CM	3.0 L8
?	(Switzerland) Horst von Waldthausen	Equipe Villars	Alfa Romeo	Alfa Romeo Monza	2.3 L8
?	(Switzerland) Julio Villars	Equipe Villars	Alfa Romeo	Alfa Romeo Monza	2.3 L8
?	(Switzerland) Walter Grosch	Equipe Villars	Alfa Romeo	Alfa Romeo Monza	2.3 L8
?	(France) Jean-Pierre Wimille	Private entry	Alfa Romeo	Alfa Romeo Monza	2.3 L8
?	(Belgium) Willy Longueville	Private entry	Bugatti	Bugatti T35B	2.3 L8

== Starting grid ==
Grid positions were drawn by ballot and the cars' numbers were allocated in grid order (#2 for pole position, #4 for second place, etc.)

First row
3		2		1
(France) Moll Alfa Romeo		(France) Lehoux Bugatti		(Monaco) Chiron Alfa Romeo
Second row
	5		4	
	(Italy) Borzacchini Alfa Romeo		(France) Sommer Alfa Romeo	
Third row
8		7		6
(United Kingdom) Grover-Williams Bugatti		(Italy) Varzi Bugatti		(Italy) Siena Alfa Romeo
Fourth row
	10		9	
	(Switzerland) "Marko" Bugatti		(France) Dreyfus Bugatti	
Fifth row
	12		11	
	(Italy) Zehender Maserati		(Italy) Nuvolari Maserati	

== Classification ==
=== Race ===
Pos	No	Driver	Car	Laps	Time/Retired	Grid
1	22	(Italy) Tazio Nuvolari	Maserati 8CM	40	4:09:11	11
2	14	(Italy) Achille Varzi	Bugatti T51	40	+3:45	7
3	18	(France) René Dreyfus	Bugatti T51	40	+3:48	9
4	4	(France) Marcel Lehoux	Bugatti T51	40	+4:17	2
5	12	(Italy) Eugenio Siena	Alfa Romeo Monza	40	+7:59	6
6	16	(United Kingdom) William Grover-Williams	Bugatti T51	39	+1 lap	8
7	8	(France) Raymond Sommer	Alfa Romeo Monza	35	+5 laps	4
Ret	10	(Italy) Baconin Borzacchini	Alfa Romeo Monza	22	Connecting rod	5
Ret	6	(France) Guy Moll	Alfa Romeo Monza	20	Gearbox/clutch	3
Ret	2	(Monaco) Louis Chiron	Alfa Romeo Monza	20	Differential	1
Ret	20	(Switzerland) "Marko"	Bugatti T51	15	Accident	10
Ret	24	(Italy) Goffredo Zehender	Maserati 8CM	10	Transmission	12
DNA	—	(Italy) Giuseppe Campari	Maserati 8CM		Injured at Marne Grand Prix	
DNA	—	(Switzerland) Horst von Waldthausen	Alfa Romeo Monza		Withdrawn, raced at La Baraque	
DNA	—	(Switzerland) Julio Villars	Alfa Romeo Monza		Withdrawn, raced at La Baraque	
DNA	—	(Switzerland) Walter Grosch	Alfa Romeo Monza		Did not show up	
DNA	—	(France) Jean-Pierre Wimille	Alfa Romeo Monza		Did not show up	
DNA	—	(Belgium) Willy Longueville	Bugatti T35B		Car not ready	

Grand Prix Race
Previous race: 1933 French Grand Prix	1933 Grand Prix season Grandes Épreuves	Next race: 1933 Italian Grand Prix
Previous race: 1931 Belgian Grand Prix	Belgian Grand Prix	Next race: 1934 Belgian Grand Prix
