= 1933 Italian Grand Prix =

Race details
- Date: 10 September 1933
- Official name: XI Gran Premio d'Italia
- Location: Autodromo Nazionale di Monza; Monza, Italy
- Course: Permanent racing facility
- Course length: 10.00 km (6.21 miles)
- Distance: 50 laps, 500.000 km (310.694 miles)

Pole position
| Driver | (Italy) Eugenio Siena | Alfa Romeo |
- Grid positions set by ballot

Fastest lap
| Driver | (Italy) Luigi Fagioli | Alfa Romeo |
- Time: 3:13.2

Podium
| First | (Italy) Luigi Fagioli | Alfa Romeo |
| Second | (Italy) Tazio Nuvolari | Maserati |
| Third | (Italy) Goffredo Zehender | Maserati |

The 1933 Italian Grand Prix (formally the XI Gran Premio d'Italia) was a Grand Prix motor race held at Monza on 10 September 1933. The race was held over 50 laps of a 10 km circuit for a total race distance of 500 km and was won by Luigi Fagioli driving an Alfa Romeo.

The same day, the Monza Grand Prix was held on the same site, but using only the banked oval circuit. Three top drivers: Giuseppe Campari, Baconin Borzacchini and Stanislas Czaykowski were killed in two separate accidents.

== Starting Grid (4-4-4): Positions Drawn ==
| Grid | Driver | Grid | Driver | Grid | Driver | Grid | Driver |
|---|---|---|---|---|---|---|---|
| 1 | (Italy) Eugenio Siena | 2 | (Italy) Luigi Premoli | 3 | (France) Jean Gaupillat | 4 | (France) Robert Brunet |
| 5 | (Italy) Luigi Fagioli | 6 | (Italy) Carlo Castelbarco | 7 | (Italy) Piero Taruffi | 8 | (Italy) Clemente Biondetti |
| 9 | (Italy) Ernesto Maserati | 10 | (Italy) Tazio Nuvolari | 11 | (Italy) Lelio Pellegrini | 12 | (Monaco) Louis Chiron |
| 13 | (Italy) Goffredo Zehender | 14 | (United Kingdom) Francis Howe | 15 | (Italy) Antonio Brivio | 16 | (Italy) Pietro Ghersi |
| 17 | (France) Guy Moll | 18 | (United Kingdom) Whitney Straight | 19 | (Italy) Renato Balestrero | 20 | (France) Marcel Lehoux |

== Classification ==
| Pos | No | Driver | Car | Laps | Time/retire |
|---|---|---|---|---|---|
| 1 | 12 | (Italy) Luigi Fagioli | Alfa Romeo B (8C-2600) | 50 | 2h51m41.0 |
| 2 | 28 | (Italy) Tazio Nuvolari | Maserati 8CM (8C-3000) | 50 | 2h52m21.2 |
| 3 | 34 | (Italy) Goffredo Zehender | Maserati 8CM (8C-3000) | 48 | +2 laps |
| 4 | 52 | (France) Marcel Lehoux | Alfa Romeo 8C-2300 | 47 | +3 laps |
| SHR | 4 | (Italy) Eugenio Siena | Alfa Romeo 8C-2300 | 47 | +3 laps |
| SHR | 4 | (Italy) Antonio Brivio | Alfa Romeo 8C-2300 | 47 | +3 laps |
| 6 | 16 | (Italy) Carlo Castelbarco | Alfa Romeo 8C-2300 | 47 | +3 laps |
| 7 | 42 | (Italy) Pietro Ghersi | Alfa Romeo 8C-2300 | 47 | +3 laps |
| 8 | 46 | (France) Guy Moll | Alfa Romeo 8C-2300 | 46 | +4 laps |
| 9 | 50 | (Italy) Renato Balestrero | Alfa Romeo 8C-2300 | 44 | +6 laps |
| 10 | 10 | (France) Robert Brunet | Bugatti T51 | 43 | +7 laps |
| 11 | 48 | (United Kingdom) Whitney Straight | Maserati 26M (8C-2500) | 43 | +7 laps |
| 12 | 38 | (United Kingdom) Earl Howe | Bugatti T51 | 41 | +9 laps |
| 13 | 30 | (Italy) Lelio Pellegrini | Alfa Romeo 8C-2300 | 39 | +11 laps |
| Ret | 32 | (Monaco) Louis Chiron | Alfa Romeo B (8C-2600) | 42 | Exhaust pipe |
| Ret | 40 | (Italy) Antonio Brivio | Alfa Romeo 8C-2300 | 25 | Did not finish |
| Ret | 22 | (Italy) Piero Taruffi | Maserati 8CM (8C-3000) | 25 | Crash |
| Ret | 8 | (France) Jean Gaupillat | Bugatti T51 | 9 | Did not finish |
| Ret | 24 | (Italy) Clemente Biondetti | MB Speciale Maserati 8C-3000 | 8 | Did not finish |
| Ret | 6 | (Italy) Luigi Premoli | PBM Maserati 8C-3000 | 6 | Did not finish |
| DNS | 26 | (Italy) Ernesto Maserati | Maserati 8C-3000 | | Did not start |
| DNA | 2 | (Italy) Giuseppe Campari | Alfa Romeo B (8C-2600) | | Did not arrive |
| DNA | 14 | (Austria) Walter Wüstrow | Bugatti T35C | | Did not arrive |
| DNA | 18 | (France) Raymond Sommer | Alfa Romeo 8C-2300 | | Did not arrive |
| DNA | 20 | (Austria) Charley Jellen | Alfa Romeo 8C-2300 | | Did not arrive |
| DNA | 36 | (Poland) Stanisłas Czaykowski | Bugatti T54 | | Did not arrive |
| DNA | 44 | (Germany) Paul Pietsch | Alfa Romeo 8C-2300 | | Did not arrive |

Fastest Lap: (Italy) Luigi Fagioli, 3m13.2 (186.34 km/h)

Grand Prix Race
| Previous race: 1933 Belgian Grand Prix | 1933 Grand Prix season Grandes Épreuves | Next race: 1933 Spanish Grand Prix |
| Previous race: 1932 Italian Grand Prix | Italian Grand Prix | Next race: 1934 Italian Grand Prix |
