= 1933 Grand Prix season =

Intermediate year for the AIACR European Championship

Seasons
- ← 1932 1934 →

The 1933 Grand Prix season was in an intermediate year, as it would be the last season for the current AIACR regulations before a new weight-formula was introduced in 1934. As such, the European Championship was not held and the manufacturers held back on further developments of their existing models. Alfa Romeo, following an Italian government financial bailout and like Mercedes-Benz the previous year, had shut down its Alfa Corse works team. Scuderia Ferrari, their regular customer team took up the role of racing Alfa Romeos and a number of ex-works drivers moved across to join their ranks. They were not allowed, however, to buy the impressive Tipo B that had been so dominant in the previous season.

The season had some exceptional races and fell into two distinct halves. Initially it was Tazio Nuvolari, driving for the Scuderia Ferrari, that dominated. However, after winning the Tunisian Grand Prix he was plagued by mechanical problems and retiring out of race-winning positions. A thrilling race-long battle with Achille Varzi at the Monaco Grand Prix was decided on the second-to-last lap when the engine on Nuvolari's Alfa broke. He was untouchable at a wet Nürburgring but retired in the French Grand Prix - a race won by the veteran Giuseppe Campari in the new Maserati model. In the middle of these was one of the most controversial pre-war races yet held – the Tripoli Grand Prix. It was held in conjunction with a multi-million national lottery to win tickets for each of the drivers. In the race, it again became a Varzi-Nuvolari duel, decided at the last corner when Varzi outbraked Nuvolari to win by a fifth of a second.

The frustration came to a head after a third axle-failure and Nuvolari, with close friend Borzacchini, walked out of Ferrari straight across to Maserati. Luigi Fagioli, lead-driver of the Maserati works-team, was furious that his great rival had been approached and in response took the vacant position at Ferrari, soon to be joined by Campari. Nuvolari won successive races with the Maserati at Spa, Montenero and Nice. Alfa Romeo, now concerned that they were losing their pre-eminence, released their Tipo B cars to Ferrari. Fagioli won on the car's return, at the Coppa Acerbo after Nuvolari had a mechanical retirement.

In the Italian Grand Prix, Fagioli benefited from Nuvolari's misfortune after he got a puncture while leading with two laps remaining. The Monza GP was run in the afternoon, held as three heats to qualify for the final. In the second heat, Campari and Borzacchini both crashed on the oval banking and were killed. Then, in the final, Stanisław Czaykowski was also killed at almost the same place. Subsequently, known as the "Black Day of Monza", it was a further tragic weekend in a deadly year of motorsport.

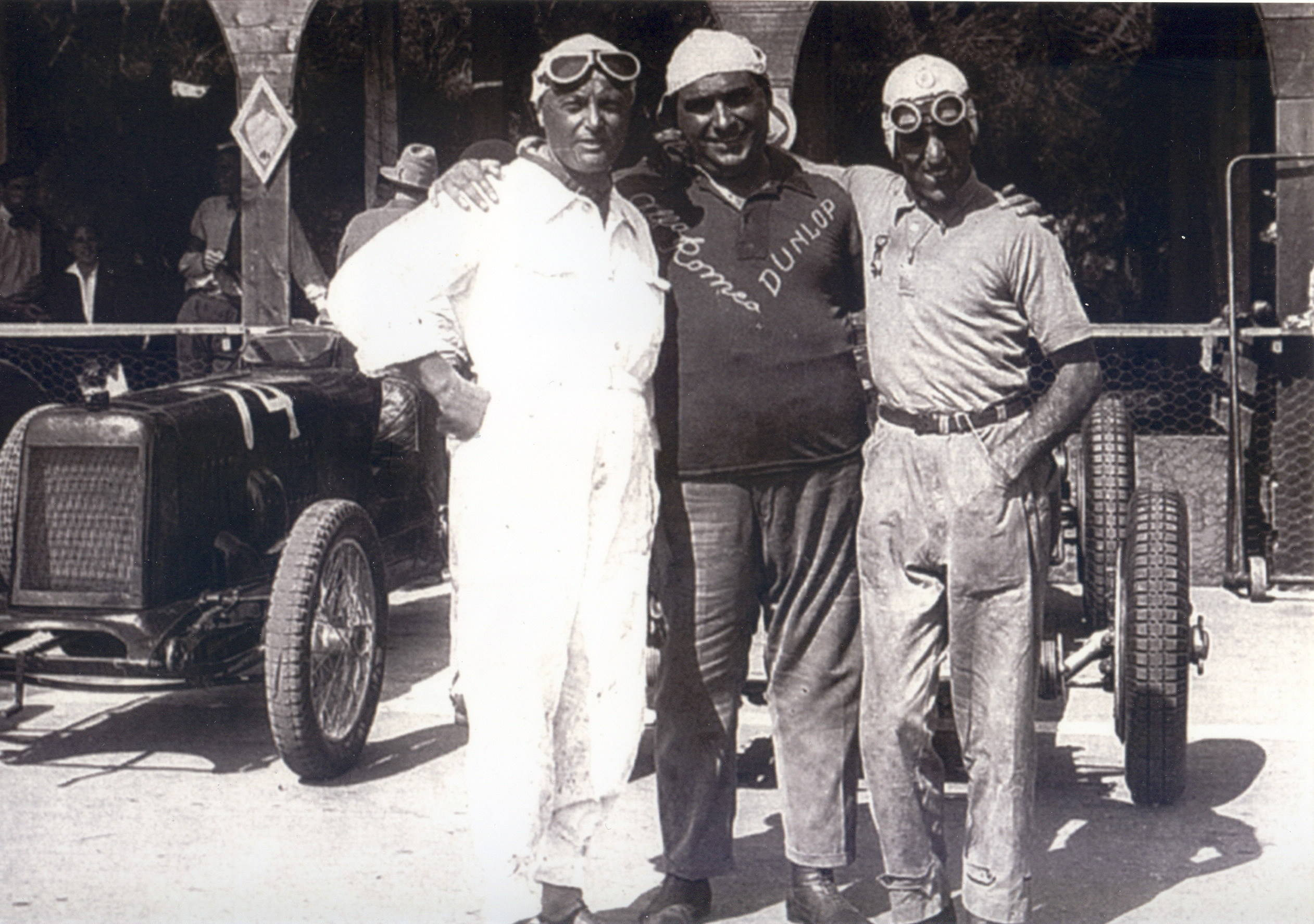
Borzacchini, Campari and Nuvolari in the pits at the Coppa Ciano

The last major race of the year was the Spanish Grand Prix that finally saw the debut of Bugatti's new Type 59, the model for the new formula. A mid-race downpour saw Nuvolari aquaplane off the track and crash, thereby giving Chiron his third victory of the season and Ferrari its third 1-2 finish.

== Grand Épreuves ==
This year the AIACR elevated the Monaco Grand Prix to the exclusive rank of Grand Épreuve, hitherto only held by the other six national races of their member bodies, alongside the Indianapolis 500 for the US and the Tourist Trophy for Great Britain. These held special scheduling privileges that the CSI would set the racing calendar around, and other international events could not be held on the same day opposite those races. They also attempted, unsuccessfully, to tighten up on the usage of “Grand Prix” to limit it to the premier event of each of the affiliated associations.

	Date	Name	Circuit	Race Regulations	Weather	Race Distance	Winner's Time	Winning driver	Winning constructor	Fastest lap	Report
1	23 Apr	V Grand Prix de Monaco	Monte Carlo	Formula Libre	sunny	320 km	3h 28m	(Italy) Achille Varzi	Bugatti Type 51	Achille Varzi; Bugatti	Report
	30 May	(United States) XXI International 500 Mile; Sweepstakes	Indianapolis	AAA	fine	500 miles	4h 48m	(United States) Louis Meyer	Miller	not recorded	Report
2	11 Jun	(France) XXVII Grand Prix de l’ACF	Montlhéry	AIACR	overcast, late rain	500 km	3h 49m	(Italy) Giuseppe Campari	Maserati 8C-3000	Giuseppe Campari; Maserati	Report
3	9 Jul	(Belgium) IV Grand Prix de Belgique	Spa-Francorchamps	AIACR	overcast	590 km	4h 09m	(Italy) Tazio Nuvolari	Maserati 8CM	Tazio Nuvolari; Maserati	Report
	2 Sep	(United Kingdom) XII RAC Tourist Trophy	Ards-Belfast	sports, handicap	fine	480 miles	5h 57m	(Italy) Tazio Nuvolari	MG K3 Magnette	(United Kingdom) Tim Rose-Richards; Alfa Romeo	Report
4	10 Sep	(Italy) XI Gran Premio d’Italia	Monza	AIACR	overcast, drying track	500 km	2h 52m	(Italy) Luigi Fagioli	Alfa Romeo Tipo B	Luigi Fagioli; Alfa Romeo	Report
5	24 Sep	(Spain) VI Gran Premio de España	Lasarte	AIACR	rain	520 km / 530 km	3h 51m	(Monaco) Louis Chiron	Alfa Romeo Tipo B	Tazio Nuvolari; Maserati	Report
	1 Oct	(Germany) German Grand Prix	Nürburgring	Postponed, then cancelled							

A pink background indicates the race was run for Sports Cars or Touring Cars this year, while a grey background indicates the race was not held this year. Sources:

== Major Races ==
Multiple classes are mentioned when they were divided and run to different race lengths.

	Date	Name	Circuit	Race Regulations	Weather	Race Distance	Winner's Time	Winning driver	Winning constructor	Report
	19 Feb	(France) II Grand Prix de Pau	Pau	Formula Libre	snow	210 km	2h 54m	(French Algeria) Marcel Lehoux	Bugatti Type 51	Report
	(23 Feb) / 26 Feb	(Sweden) III Sveriges Vinter Grand Prix	Lake Rämen	Formula Libre	sunny	370 km	4h 28m	(Sweden) Per-Viktor Widengren	Alfa Romeo 8C 2300 Monza	Report
	20 Mar	(Australia) VI Australian Grand Prix	Phillip Island	Formula Libre handicap	sunny	200 miles	3h 09m	(Australia) Bill Thompson	Riley Brooklands	Report
A	26 Mar / (29 Mar)	(French protectorate of Tunisia) V Grand Prix de Tunisie	Carthage	Formula Libre	dry, then rain	470 km	3h 29m	(Italy) Tazio Nuvolari	Alfa Romeo 8C 2300 Monza	Report
	30 Apr	(Italy) IX Circuito di Alessandria (Circuito Pietro Bordino)	Alessandria	Formula Libre, heats	heavy rain	120 km	1h 02m	(Italy) Tazio Nuvolari	Alfa Romeo 8C 2600	Report
B	7 May	(Libya) VII Gran Premio di Tripoli (I Lotteria di Tripoli)	Mellaha	Formula Libre	sunny	390 km	2h 20m	(Italy) Achille Varzi	Bugatti Type 51	Report
	7 May	(Finland) II Eläintarhanajot (Djurgårdsloppet)	Eläintarharata	Formula Libre	sunny	100 km	1h 03m	(Finland) Karl Ebb	Mercedes-Benz SSK	Report
C	21 May	(Germany) III Internationales Avusrennen	AVUS	Formula Libre; Voiturette	sunny	300 km	1h 25m	(Italy) Achille Varzi	Bugatti Type 54	Report
	21 May	(France) IX Grand Prix de Picardie	Péronne	Formula Libre; Voiturette	?	200 km	1h 26m	(France) Philippe Étancelin	Alfa Romeo 8C 2300 Monza	Report
D	28 May	(Germany) VII Eifelrennen	Nürburgring	Formula Libre; Voiturette	overcast	340 km	3h 01m	(Italy) Tazio Nuvolari	Alfa Romeo 8C 2600	Report
	28 May	(Italy) XXIV Targa Florio	Piccolo Madonie	Targa Florio	sunny	500 km	6h 35m	(Italy) Marchese Antonio Brivio	Alfa Romeo 8C 2300 Monza	Report
	4 Jun	(France) II Trophée de Provence	Nîmes	Formula Libre; Voiturette	sunny	105 km	1h 03m	(France) Marcel Jacob	Bugatti Type 35C	Report
	4 Jun	(France) II Grand Prix de Nîmes	Nîmes	Formula Libre	sunny	210 km	1h 52m	(Italy) Tazio Nuvolari	Alfa Romeo 8C 2600	Report
	4 Jun	(Belgium) VIII Grand Prix des Frontières	Chimay	Formula Libre; Voiturette	sunny	160 km	1h 21m	(Belgium) Willy Longueville	Bugatti Type 35B	Report
	11 Jun	(Poland) III Grand Prix Lwowa (Großer Preis von Lemberg)	Lviv	Formula Libre	rain	300 km	3h 40m	(Norway) Eugen Bjørnstad	Alfa Romeo 8C 2300 Monza	Report
	11 Jun	(Italy) Florence Circuit	Florence	Formula Libre	?			(Italy) Conde Carlo Felice Trossi	Alfa Romeo 8C 2600	Report
	25 Jun	(Spain) IV Gran Premio de Penya Rhin (I Copa Barcelona)	Montjuïc Park	Formula Libre	?	150 km	1h 36m	(Chile) Juan Zanelli	Alfa Romeo 8C 2300 Monza	Report
	1 Jul	(United Kingdom) II British Empire Trophy	Brooklands	Formula Libre	?	125 miles	1h 00m	(Poland) Stanislas Czaykowski	Bugatti Type 54	Report
E	2 Jul	(France) VIII Grand Prix de la Marne	Reims-Gueux	Formula Libre	sunny	400 km	2h 45m	(France) Philippe Étancelin	Alfa Romeo 8C 2300 Monza	Report
	12 Jul	(United Kingdom) Mannin Beg	Douglas	Voiturette	sunny	230 miles	4h 13m	(United Kingdom) Freddie Dixon	Riley 1500/6	Report
	14 Jul	(United Kingdom) Mannin Moar	Douglas	Formula Libre	sunny	230 miles	3h 35m	(United Kingdom) Brian Lewis, Baron Essendon	Alfa Romeo 8C 2300 Monza	Report
	(15 Jul) / 16 Jul	(France) V Grand Prix de Dieppe	Dieppe	Formula Libre	overcast	588 km (winner)	3 hours	(France) Marcel Lehoux	Bugatti Type 51	Report
	30 Jul	(Italy) VII Coppa Ciano	Montenero	Formula Libre; Voiturette	hot	240 km	2h 45m	(Italy) Tazio Nuvolari	Maserati 8CM	Report
F	6 Aug	(France) II Grand Prix de Nice	Nice	Formula Libre	sunny	300 km	2h 56m	(Italy) Tazio Nuvolari	Maserati 8CM	Report
	6 Aug	(Sweden) I Sveriges Sommer Grand Prix	Norra Vram	Formula Libre	sunny	360 km	2h 52m	(Italy) Antonio Brivio	Alfa Romeo 8C 2600	Report
	13 Aug	(France) IX Grand Prix de la Baule	La Baule beach	Formula Libre	sunny	200 km	1h 25m	(United Kingdom) William Grover-Williams	Bugatti Type 54	Report
G	15 Aug / (13 Aug)	(Italy) IX Coppa Acerbo	Pescara	Formula Libre; Voiturette	hot	310 km	2h 09m	(Italy) Luigi Fagioli	Alfa Romeo Tipo B	Report
	20 Aug	(France) IX Grand Prix du Comminges	Saint-Gaudens	Formula Libre	fine, then rain at end	390 km	2h 41m	(Italy) Luigi Fagioli	Alfa Romeo 8C 2600	Report
H	27 Aug	(France) II Grand Prix de Marseille	Miramas	Formula Libre	hot	500 km	2h 49m	(Monaco) Louis Chiron	Alfa Romeo Tipo B	Report
	27 Aug	(France) Grand Prix d’Albi	Les Planques, Albi	Formula Libre; Voiturette	?	200 km	1h 24m	(France) Louis Braillard	Bugatti Type 51	Report
J	10 Sep	(Italy) VI Gran Premio di Monza	Monza oval	Formula Libre, heats	dry	200 km	21mins	(French Algeria) Marcel Lehoux	Bugatti Type 51	Report
K	17 Sep	(Czechoslovakia) IV Masarykuv Okruh	Masaryk-Ring, Brno	Formula Libre; Voiturette	rain, then drying	500 km	4h 50m	(Monaco) Louis Chiron	Alfa Romeo Tipo B	Report
	17 Sep	(France) II Grand Prix de l’UMF	Montlhéry	Formula Libre; Voiturette	?	80 km	38mins	(France) Raymond Sommer	Alfa Romeo Monza	Report
	7 Oct	(United Kingdom) Donington Park Trophy	Donington Park	Formula Libre	rain	70 km	43mins	(United Kingdom) Earl Howe	Bugatti Type 51	Report
	8 Oct	(Brazil) Grande Prêmio da Cidade de Rio de Janeiro	Gávea	Formula Libre	?	220 km	3h 19m	(Brazil) Baron Manuel de Teffé	Alfa Romeo 1750	Report

== Regulations and Technical ==
The 1933 season was to be the final one run to Formula Libre (open formula) regulations. The CSI regulatory body of the AIACR had announced a new 750kg, weight-based formula coming into effect from 1934. For unknown reasons, the European Championship was discontinued after only two years, despite five of the national races being planned to be held. The Italian and Swiss associations held their own national championships anyway.

The only significant change to the regulations was to change the minimum race distance from 5 hours to 500km.

The Monaco Grand Prix was elevated to the esteemed Grandes Épreuves status, held by the six European national races (of France, Italy, Spain, Belgium and Germany), the Indianapolis 500 and the British Tourist Trophy (run as a sports car race). This year, it also started a new process where the times recorded in the practice sessions before the race would decide the grid order, with the fastest cars in practice at the front. Up till now, the grid order had been decided by random ballot or just by the order the entries were received in. This idea was picked up by several other events and is now the standard practice across motor-racing.

To allow for the new German cars for the next season to compete, the German Grand Prix was initially postponed from July to October and moving from the Nürburgring to AVUS. However, when insufficient entries were confirmed by August the race was instead cancelled.

Since the Targa Florio's inception in 1906, Vincenzo Florio had bankrolled the race out of his personal fortune. However, the economic downturn had had a severe impact on the family funds and in 1933 the organisation of the event was taken over by the Royal Italian Automobile Club from their regional office in Palermo. Throughout this time in Great Britain, motor-racing had been restricted to the Brooklands circuit, and the Isle of Man and Ireland, that had their own traffic rules. In 1931, former motorcycle racer Fred Craner had approached the Donington Hall estate near Derby to build a new circuit on the estate roads. By 1933, Craner had got the 3.5 km circuit sealed and widened, and the inaugural car race at Donington Park was held in March.

=== Technical Innovation ===
As it was the last year of the current regulations, manufacturers were loath to spend too much time or their limited money on current models, instead choosing to focus on design and development of their models for the new regulations of 1934.

Financial troubles at Alfa Romeo had necessitated a bailout by the Italian government. Taken over by a new agency, the Istituto per la Ricostruzione Industriale (IRI) the company was effectively nationalised. Ugo Gobbato was appointed the new managing director. With the withdrawal of Alfa Romeo from motor-racing, and the denial of the Tipo B, Scuderia Ferrari was forced to improvise with their six 8C Monza cars, boring them out from 2.3 to 2.6-litres. Sadly, in July, the former Alfa Corse team manager, Aldo Giovannini, died after battling illness for several months.

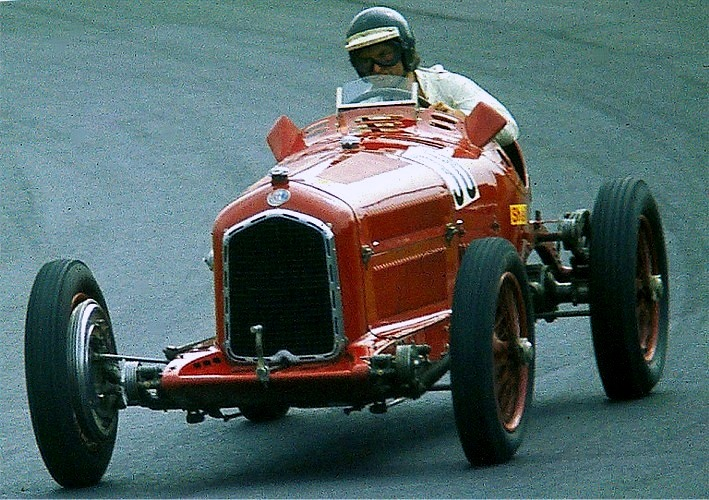
Alfa Romeo Tipo B

Maserati continued with the two 8C-3000 cars it had from 1932. But the company was the first to produce a car for the new formula. The 8CM was a development of the 8C-3000, and taking the lead from the Tipo B, was a monoposto (single-seater) design, hence its designation. It was the fastest car of the season, but very twitchy even for a top driver like Nuvolari. Piero Taruffi said

It was very fast and powerful but by no means stable at speed. The frame was insufficiently rigid and the rather large amount of unsprung weight used to set up such torsional vibrations, that the entire running gear used to judder."

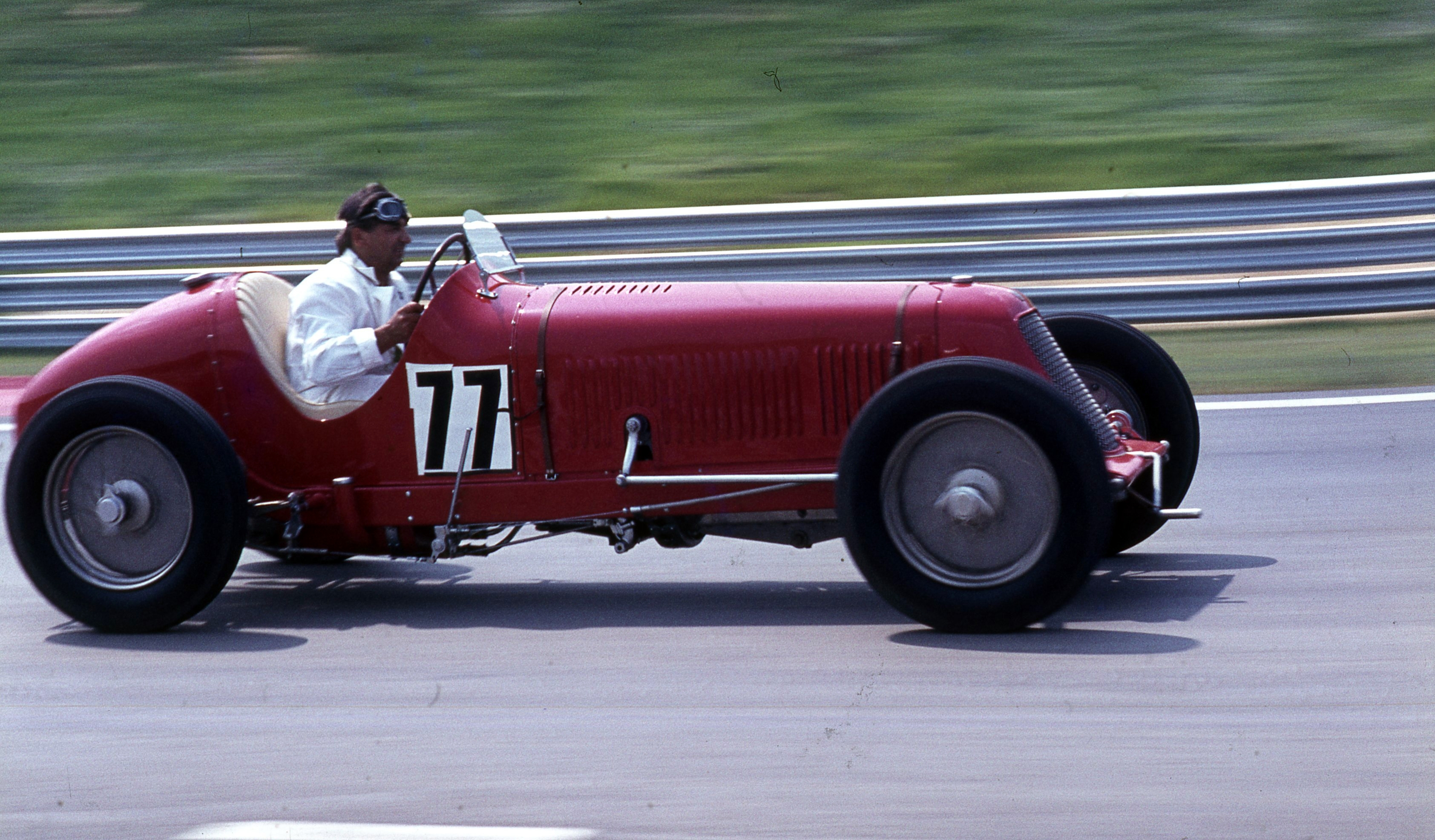
Maserati 8CM

Ettore Bugatti's Type 51 was starting to show its age. Despite its balance and handling it was being outclassed by the more powerful Italian cars. However, the withdrawal of the P3 allowed the Type 51 to remain competitive against the remaining opposition. Bugatti's prospective design for the new formula was the Type 59 and was supposed to be ready for the mid-year French Grand Prix. Predominantly the work of his son Jean, it is regarded as one of the world's most elegant racing cars. A sleek design with a very low driveshaft, it had a low centre of gravity. But the 2-seater with its 2.8-litre, 8-cylinder twin-overhead cam engine was disappointingly off the pace with poor brakes and unsatisfactory road-holding. After several false starts, it finally made its debut at Lasarte at the last major race of the season.

In Germany, both Mercedes-Benz and the new Auto Union company were working toward the upcoming racing formula. Dr Ferdinand Porsche had found a taker for his new design at Wanderer, that had now become a part of Auto Union. The mid-engined race-car took inspiration from the Benz Tropfenwagen of the mid-20s that had been driven by his business partner, former racer Adolf Rosenberger. The designer of the Tropfenwagen, Dr Hans Nibel, had replaced Porsche as Technical Director at Mercedes-Benz. The new government of Adolf Hitler provided a fund of RM450,000 (about £45,000) to divide among the German companies. Mercedes-Benz works team manager Alfred Neubauer estimated the subsidy covered about 10% of the team's costs.

In Great Britain, at the end of the year, Raymond Mays, Peter Berthon and wealthy gentleman-driver Humphrey Cook founded English Racing Automobiles (ERA) to build a competitive British voiturette. Cook personally invested £75,000 into the project.

Manufacturer	Model	Engine	Power Output	Max. Speed (km/h)	Dry Weight (kg)
(Italy) Alfa Romeo	Alfa Romeo Tipo B	Alfa Romeo 2.65L S8 twin-supercharged	215 bhp	230	700
(Italy) Alfa Romeo	8C-2600	Alfa Romeo 2.6L S8 supercharged	180 bhp	225	920
(France) Bugatti	Type 51	Bugatti 2.3L S8 supercharged	180 bhp	230	750
(France) Bugatti	Type 54	Bugatti 5.0L S8 supercharged	300 bhp	240	930
(Italy) Maserati	8C-3000	Maserati 3.0L S8 supercharged	220 bhp	240	850
(Italy) Maserati	8CM	Maserati 3.0L S8 supercharged	240 bhp	250	750
(France) Bugatti	Type 51A	Bugatti 1492cc S8 supercharged	135 bhp	200	750
(Italy) Maserati	4CM	Maserati 1.1L S4	135 bhp	155	680
(United Kingdom) MG	K3 Magnette	MG 1087cc S6	120 bhp	190	790
(United Kingdom) Riley	1500/6	Riley 1486cc S4	96 bhp	190	890

== Teams and drivers ==
Financial struggles had forced Alfa Romeo to appeal to the Italian government for a bailout and that meant shutting down its works team. The Scuderia Ferrari customer team defaulted to becoming the representative of the company, however Alfa Romeo would not release, or sell, their dominant Tipo B works cars to Enzo Ferrari, much to his chagrin. The works drivers were released from their contracts and were quickly snapped up by other teams. Nuvolari and Borzacchini went to Ferrari, while the veteran Campari joined Maserati. Ferrari also had Mille Miglia winner Eugenio Siena and wealthy noblemen Conte Carlo Felice Trossi (Ferrari president) and Marchese Antonio Brivio. However, Nuvolari's dissatisfaction with the ongoing unreliability and uncompetitiveness of Ferrari's cars led to him and Borzacchini walking out halfway through the season to join their competitors, Maserati.

After the death of Alfieri Maserati, the previous year, younger brother Ernesto took up the racing team's management, and as a some-time spare driver. Rather than keep a set squad of drivers, he chose to have a revolving door of contract drivers, with Luigi Fagioli as his senior driver and team captain. Nuvolari's mid-season arrival from Ferrari in its turn infuriated Faglioli, who kept a tense rivalry with Nuvolari and he, in response, left with Campari to join Ferrari.

Over at the French Bugatti team, Achille Varzi stayed on as the lead driver. Former occasional works-drivers René Dreyfus and William Grover-Williams now became full-time team-members. Pierre Veyron ran one of the new 1.5-litre Type 51A cars in the voiturette races, while Albert Divo shared the team management with ”Meo” Costantini. Erstwhile Bugatti team-mates Louis Chiron and Rudolf Caracciola joined forces as a new team, the Scuderia C/C. They bought three new Alfa Romeo Monza grand prix and sports cars alongside Chiron's own Bugatti Type 51s. Caracciola's wife, Charly, was appointed team manager. The plan was to compete at all the major European races as well as hill-climbs and entering the Le Mans and Spa endurance races. But Caracciola's bad accident at Monaco put him out for the season and the team was subsequently dissolved, with Chiron eventually joining the Scuderia Ferrari.

There was also the more regular appearance of several other 2-man teams, forming up to combine resources. Swiss drivers Karl von Waldthausen and Julio Villars ran a pair of Alfa Romeo Monzas together at races in France and northern Italy until von Waldthausen's untimely death at the Marseille Grand Prix. Racing friends Paul Pietsch and “Charly” Jellen both ran Alfa Romeos and joined up to alternate with doing road races and the hill-climbs across Germany. New French sensation Raymond Sommer had already made a big impression in the previous season. For this year he had a pair of the brand new Maserati 8CM which he raced with Goffredo Zehender. But they suffered from poor steering and the Italian instead left and joined the works team. Sommer sold his car to Nuvolari, and offered to share resources with another impressive young Frenchman, Jean-Pierre Wimille, and his Alfa Romeo. Scuderia Centro-Sud (also known as Écurie Friderich) was based in Nice and run by Ernest Friderich, a successful racer from the previous decade. Equipped with a new 1.5-litre Bugatti Type 37A and a bigger Type 35, they raced in France and Spain. Pietro Ghersi had several Bugattis that he raced around Italy. He also teamed up with the Scuderia Capredoni and used their Alfa Monza.

In February, barely a fortnight after coming into government, Adolf Hitler opened the international motor-fair in Berlin announcing government support for motorsport and the automotive industry. With that ringing endorsement, the Daimler-Benz racing team returned to making an official presence, starting with races in Germany. The age of state-sponsored motor-racing had arrived.

These tables only intend to cover entries in the major races, using the key above. It includes all starters in the Grandes Épreuves. Sources:

Entrant	Constructor	Chassis	Engine	Tyre	Driver	Rounds
(Italy) Officine Alfieri Maserati SpA	Maserati	8C-3000; 8C-2800; Tipo 8CM; Tipo 4CM	Maserati 3.0L S8 s/c Maserati 2.8L S8 s/c Maserati 3.0L S8 s/c Maserati 2.0L S4	?	(Italy) Ernesto Maserati	[2], [4]
(Italy) Officine Alfieri Maserati SpA	Maserati	8C-3000; 8C-2800; Tipo 8CM; Tipo 4CM	Maserati 3.0L S8 s/c Maserati 2.8L S8 s/c Maserati 3.0L S8 s/c Maserati 2.0L S4	?	(Italy) Luigi Fagioli	1♠, [2]; A, B, [C], [D]
(Italy) Officine Alfieri Maserati SpA	Maserati	8C-3000; 8C-2800; Tipo 8CM; Tipo 4CM	Maserati 3.0L S8 s/c Maserati 2.8L S8 s/c Maserati 3.0L S8 s/c Maserati 2.0L S4	?	(Italy) Giuseppe Campari	2♠, [3]; B, E, F
(Italy) Officine Alfieri Maserati SpA	Maserati	8C-3000; 8C-2800; Tipo 8CM; Tipo 4CM	Maserati 3.0L S8 s/c Maserati 2.8L S8 s/c Maserati 3.0L S8 s/c Maserati 2.0L S4	?	(Italy) Conte Goffredo Zehender	3, 4, 5; H
(Italy) Officine Alfieri Maserati SpA	Maserati	8C-3000; 8C-2800; Tipo 8CM; Tipo 4CM	Maserati 3.0L S8 s/c Maserati 2.8L S8 s/c Maserati 3.0L S8 s/c Maserati 2.0L S4	?	(Italy) Nicola Parenti	4*
(Italy) Officine Alfieri Maserati SpA	Maserati	8C-3000; 8C-2800; Tipo 8CM; Tipo 4CM	Maserati 3.0L S8 s/c Maserati 2.8L S8 s/c Maserati 3.0L S8 s/c Maserati 2.0L S4	?	(Italy) Tazio Nuvolari	4, 5; F♠, G♠, H, [J]
(Italy) Officine Alfieri Maserati SpA	Maserati	8C-3000; 8C-2800; Tipo 8CM; Tipo 4CM	Maserati 3.0L S8 s/c Maserati 2.8L S8 s/c Maserati 3.0L S8 s/c Maserati 2.0L S4	?	(Italy) Baconin Borzacchini	G♠, H, J†
(Italy) Officine Alfieri Maserati SpA	Maserati	8C-3000; 8C-2800; Tipo 8CM; Tipo 4CM	Maserati 3.0L S8 s/c Maserati 2.8L S8 s/c Maserati 3.0L S8 s/c Maserati 2.0L S4	?	(Italy) Piero Taruffi	5
(France) Automobiles Ettore Bugatti	Bugatti	Type 51; Type 54; Type 59	Bugatti 2.3L S8 s/c Bugatti 5.0L 2x8 s/c Bugatti 2.8L S8 s/c	D	(Italy) Achille Varzi	1, [2], 3, [4], 5; A, B♠, C, F♠, G♠, K♠
(France) Automobiles Ettore Bugatti	Bugatti	Type 51; Type 54; Type 59	Bugatti 2.3L S8 s/c Bugatti 5.0L 2x8 s/c Bugatti 2.8L S8 s/c	D	(France) René Dreyfus	1, [2], 3, [4], 5; F, G, H, K
(France) Automobiles Ettore Bugatti	Bugatti	Type 51; Type 54; Type 59	Bugatti 2.3L S8 s/c Bugatti 5.0L 2x8 s/c Bugatti 2.8L S8 s/c	D	(United Kingdom) William Grover-Williams	1, [2], 3, [4], [5]; C
(France) Automobiles Ettore Bugatti	Bugatti	Type 51; Type 54; Type 59	Bugatti 2.3L S8 s/c Bugatti 5.0L 2x8 s/c Bugatti 2.8L S8 s/c	D	(France) Albert Divo	[2], 5*
(Germany) Daimler-Benz AG	Mercedes-Benz	SSKL	Mercedes-Benz 7.1L S6 s/c	C	(Germany) Manfred von Brauchitsch	C, D, K
(Germany) Daimler-Benz AG	Mercedes-Benz	SSKL	Mercedes-Benz 7.1L S6 s/c	C	(Germany) Otto Merz	[C†]
(Italy) Scuderia Ferrari	Alfa Romeo	8C-2300; 8C-2600; Tipo B	Alfa Romeo 2.3L S8 s/c Alfa Romeo 2.6L S8 s/c Alfa Romeo 2.7L S8 s/c	Engelbert	(Italy) Tazio Nuvolari	1, 2, 3; A, B, C, D, E
(Italy) Scuderia Ferrari	Alfa Romeo	8C-2300; 8C-2600; Tipo B	Alfa Romeo 2.3L S8 s/c Alfa Romeo 2.6L S8 s/c Alfa Romeo 2.7L S8 s/c	Engelbert	(Italy) Baconin Borzacchini	1, [2], 3; A, B, C
(Italy) Scuderia Ferrari	Alfa Romeo	8C-2300; 8C-2600; Tipo B	Alfa Romeo 2.3L S8 s/c Alfa Romeo 2.6L S8 s/c Alfa Romeo 2.7L S8 s/c	Engelbert	(Italy) Eugenio Siena	1, 3, 4, 5; C, D, G♠, [J]
(Italy) Scuderia Ferrari	Alfa Romeo	8C-2300; 8C-2600; Tipo B	Alfa Romeo 2.3L S8 s/c Alfa Romeo 2.6L S8 s/c Alfa Romeo 2.7L S8 s/c	Engelbert	(Italy) Conte Carlo Felice Trossi	1; [G], J
(Italy) Scuderia Ferrari	Alfa Romeo	8C-2300; 8C-2600; Tipo B	Alfa Romeo 2.3L S8 s/c Alfa Romeo 2.6L S8 s/c Alfa Romeo 2.7L S8 s/c	Engelbert	(Italy) Piero Taruffi	2; D
(Italy) Scuderia Ferrari	Alfa Romeo	8C-2300; 8C-2600; Tipo B	Alfa Romeo 2.3L S8 s/c Alfa Romeo 2.6L S8 s/c Alfa Romeo 2.7L S8 s/c	Engelbert	(Italy) Marchese Antonio Brivio	4; [G], K
(Italy) Scuderia Ferrari	Alfa Romeo	8C-2300; 8C-2600; Tipo B	Alfa Romeo 2.3L S8 s/c Alfa Romeo 2.6L S8 s/c Alfa Romeo 2.7L S8 s/c	Engelbert	(Italy) Luigi Fagioli	4, 5; F, G, H, K
(Italy) Scuderia Ferrari	Alfa Romeo	8C-2300; 8C-2600; Tipo B	Alfa Romeo 2.3L S8 s/c Alfa Romeo 2.6L S8 s/c Alfa Romeo 2.7L S8 s/c	Engelbert	(Italy) Giuseppe Campari	4; G, J†
(Italy) Scuderia Ferrari	Alfa Romeo	8C-2300; 8C-2600; Tipo B	Alfa Romeo 2.3L S8 s/c Alfa Romeo 2.6L S8 s/c Alfa Romeo 2.7L S8 s/c	Engelbert	(Monaco) Louis Chiron	4, 5; [G], H, K
(Italy) Scuderia Ferrari	Alfa Romeo	8C-2300; 8C-2600; Tipo B	Alfa Romeo 2.3L S8 s/c Alfa Romeo 2.6L S8 s/c Alfa Romeo 2.7L S8 s/c	Engelbert	(Italy) Mario Tadini	B, [G]
(Monaco) Scuderia C.C.	Alfa Romeo	8C-2300	Alfa Romeo 2.3L S8 s/c	?	(Monaco) Louis Chiron	1, 2, 3; C, D
(Monaco) Scuderia C.C.	Alfa Romeo	8C-2300	Alfa Romeo 2.3L S8 s/c	?	(Germany) Rudolf Caracciola	[1]
(France) R. Sommer	Maserati Alfa Romeo	8C-2800; Tipo 8CM; 8C-2300	Maserati 2.8L S8 s/c Maserati 3.0L S8 s/c Alfa Romeo 2.3L S8 s/c	?	(France) Raymond Sommer	1, 2, 3, [4]; A, [B], E, F, H
(France) R. Sommer	Maserati Alfa Romeo	8C-2800; Tipo 8CM; 8C-2300	Maserati 2.8L S8 s/c Maserati 3.0L S8 s/c Alfa Romeo 2.3L S8 s/c	?	(Italy) Conte Goffredo Zehender	1; B
(France) R. Sommer	Maserati Alfa Romeo	8C-2800; Tipo 8CM; 8C-2300	Maserati 2.8L S8 s/c Maserati 3.0L S8 s/c Alfa Romeo 2.3L S8 s/c	?	(France) Jean-Pierre Wimille	5; F, G, H, K
(Germany) Team Pietsch-Wellen	Alfa Romeo	8C-2300	Alfa Romeo 2.3L S8 s/c	?	(Germany) Paul Pietsch	[4]; A, D, E, [J], K
(Germany) Team Pietsch-Wellen	Alfa Romeo	8C-2300	Alfa Romeo 2.3L S8 s/c	?	(Czech Republic) / (Austria) Charles “Charly” Jellen	[4]; [B], C, D, E, F, [J], [K]
(Switzerland) Écurie Versoix	Alfa Romeo	8C-2300	Alfa Romeo 2.3L S8 s/c	?	(Switzerland) Julio Villars	2, [3]; A, D, E, H
(Switzerland) Écurie Versoix	Alfa Romeo	8C-2300	Alfa Romeo 2.3L S8 s/c	?	(Germany) / (Switzerland) Baron Horst von Waldthausen	2, [3]; A, D, E, H†
(Italy) Scuderia Capredoni	Bugatti Alfa Romeo	Type 51; 8C-2300	Bugatti 2.3L S8 s/c Alfa Romeo 2.3L S8 s/c	?	(Italy) Pietro Ghersi	4♠; [A♠], B♠, G, J♠

=== Privateer Drivers ===
Entrant	Constructor	Chassis	Engine	Driver	Rounds
Private Entrant	Bugatti Alfa Romeo	Type 51; 8C-2300	Bugatti 2.3L S8 s/c Alfa Romeo 2.3L S8 s/c	(French Algeria) Marcel Lehoux	1, 2, 3, 4, 5; A, E, F, H, J, K
Private Entrant	Alfa Romeo	8C-2300	Alfa Romeo 2.3L S8 s/c	(France) Jean-Pierre Wimille	1, 2, [3]; E
Private Entrant	Bugatti	Type 51	Bugatti 2.3L S8 s/c	(United Kingdom) Earl Howe	1, 2, 4; F, G, J, L
Private Entrant	Alfa Romeo	8C-2300	Alfa Romeo 2.3L S8 s/c	(France) Philippe Étancelin	1, 2, 5; A, E, F, H
Private Entrant	Bugatti	Type 51	Bugatti 2.3L S8 s/c	(France) Benoît Falchetto	1, [2], 5; A, [E]
Private Entrant	Alfa Romeo	8C-2300	Alfa Romeo 2.3L S8 s/c	(United Kingdom) Sir Henry “Tim” Birkin	1, [2]; B, †
Private Entrant	Bugatti	Type 51	Bugatti 2.3L S8 s/c	(Kingdom of Hungary) László Hartmann	1; [A], B, C, D, [F], H, K
Private Entrant	Bugatti Alfa Romeo	Type 35C; 8C-2300	Bugatti 2.0L S8 s/c Alfa Romeo 2.3L S8 s/c	(French Algeria) Guy Moll	2, 3, 4; A, E, F, H, J, K
Private Entrant	Bugatti	Type 51	Bugatti 2.3L S8 s/c	(France) Jean Gaupillat	2, 4; A, [H], [J], [K]
Private Entrant	Bugatti	Type 51C	Bugatti 2.0L S8 s/c	(Poland) / (France) Count Stanisław Czaykowski	2, [4]; A, C, J†
Private Entrant	Alfa Romeo	8C-2300	Alfa Romeo 2.3L S8 s/c	(Chile) Juan Zanelli	2, 5; A, [E], [H]
Private Entrant	Bugatti	Type 51	Bugatti 2.3L S8 s/c	(France) Pierre Bussienne	2, [5]
Private Entrant	Maserati	8C-2800; 8CM	Maserati 2.8L S8 s/c Maserati 3.0L S8 s/c	(Italy) Conte Goffredo Zehender	2; A, E, F, G, [J]
Private Entrant	Alfa Romeo	8C-2300	Alfa Romeo 2.3L S8 s/c	(United Kingdom) Capt George Eyston	2; [D]
Private Entrant	Alfa Romeo Bugatti	8C 2300; Type 35C	Alfa Romeo 2.3L S8 s/c Bugatti 2.0L S8 s/c	(France) Dr Pierre Félix	2; E, F, H
Private Entrant	Bugatti	Type 35B	Bugatti 2.3L S8 s/c	(Switzerland) Edgar “Marko” Markiewicz	3; K
Private Entrant	Bugatti	BMP Speziale	Maserati 3.0L S8 s/c	(Italy) Conte Luigi Premoli	4; A, B, J
Private Entrant	Bugatti	Type 51	Bugatti 2.3L S8 s/c	(France) Robert Brunet	4; A, G
Private Entrant	Bugatti	MB Spéciale	Maserati 2.5L S8 s/c	(Italy) Clemente Biondetti	4; B, E, [F], J
Private Entrant	Alfa Romeo Maserati	8C-2300; 8CM	Alfa Romeo 2.3L S8 s/c Maserati 3.0L S8 s/c	(Italy) Piero Taruffi	4; B, G, [J], [K]
Private Entrant	Alfa Romeo	8C-2300	Alfa Romeo 2.3L S8 s/c	(Italy) "Rover" (Lelio; Pellegrini Quarantotti)	4; B, G, J
Private Entrant	Alfa Romeo	8C-2300 spider	Alfa Romeo 2.3L S8 s/c	(Italy) Renato Balestrero	4; B, J, K
Private Entrant	Maserati Alfa Romeo	26M; 8C-2300	Maserati 3.0L S8 s/c Alfa Romeo 2.3L S8 s/c	(United States) / (United Kingdom) Whitney Straight	4; E, G, J
Private Entrant	Alfa Romeo	8C-2300	Alfa Romeo 2.3L S8 s/c	(Italy) Conte Luigi Castelbarco	4; J
Private Entrant	Bugatti	Type 35B	Bugatti 2.3L S8 s/c	(Austria) Emil Frankl	5

‘’Note: ‘’ * indicates only raced in the event as a relief driver,
“♠“ Works driver raced as a privateer in that race,
“v” indicates the driver ran in the Voiturette class,
“†” driver killed during this racing season,
Those in brackets show that, although entered, the driver did not race

== Season review ==
=== Snow and sand ===
The first event of the year was held through the streets of Pau, in the shadows of the Pyrenees Mountains. Attracting many of the best French drivers, there was a risk running an event in late-winter. Sure enough after a fine and sunny practice, an overnight snowfall left raceday blanketing the city white. Officials discussed the options with the drivers and decided to press on with the race after clearing as much snow from the track as possible and salting the roads. In front of a large, enthusiastic crowd, it was Guy Moll who initially led through the slush and returning snowfall. But it was his fellow-countryman from Algeria, Marcel Lehoux (who had drawn a starting position at the back of the grid) who drove through the field to lead by half-distance and go on for a well-deserved victory over Moll, with Philippe Étancelin in third.

The third Swedish Winter Grand Prix was held again through the tight, winding forest roads beside Lake Rämen. It attracted a huge field of almost 40 cars, mostly of big American sedans. Notable exceptions included the Alfa Romeos of Per-Victor Widengren, Norwegian Eugen Bjørnstad and German Paul Pietsch along with the big Mercedes SSKs of Finn Karl Ebb and local Börje Dahlin. Widengren's younger brother Henken ran a Belgian Invicta, but the strangest entry was Allan Westerblom's home-built Reo special, fitted with a 15-litre ex-WW1 Mercedes aero engine. Six cars crashed in practice, including Pietsch who, unused to studded tyres, had gone off at high speed on the main straight ending upside down. Another huge crowd of 100,000 people arrived on a crisp but sunny race-day. From the start, the Widengren brothers were in front. Attrition was high with just as many accidents as engine issues. P-V Widengren however was trouble-free and won the race by four minutes from Bjørnstad with just a dozen finishers. But the Norseman was later disqualified after a protest from the team of an embarrassed local Carl-Gustaf Johansson who complained his big Ford had been blocked from passing the Alfa Romeo. A week later the Swedish Ice Race was held on Lake Hjälmaren. Held as two half-hour heats, Paul Pietsch, in his repaired Alfa Romeo, won with the best aggregate time from countryman Herbert Wimmer in a Bugatti and Eugen Bjørnstad third.

The end of March saw the first major race of the year, held around the ruins of ancient Carthage just outside the city of Tunis. In Alfa Romeo's absence, the Scuderia Ferrari represented the marque with two cars for their ex-works drivers, Nuvolari and Borzacchini. In order to keep them competitive the engineers had bored out the engine of Nuvolari's car up to 2.6-litres. Maserati had a single car for Fagioli, also enlarged to 3.0-litres, while Bugatti also had a single entry, for Varzi and his Type 51.

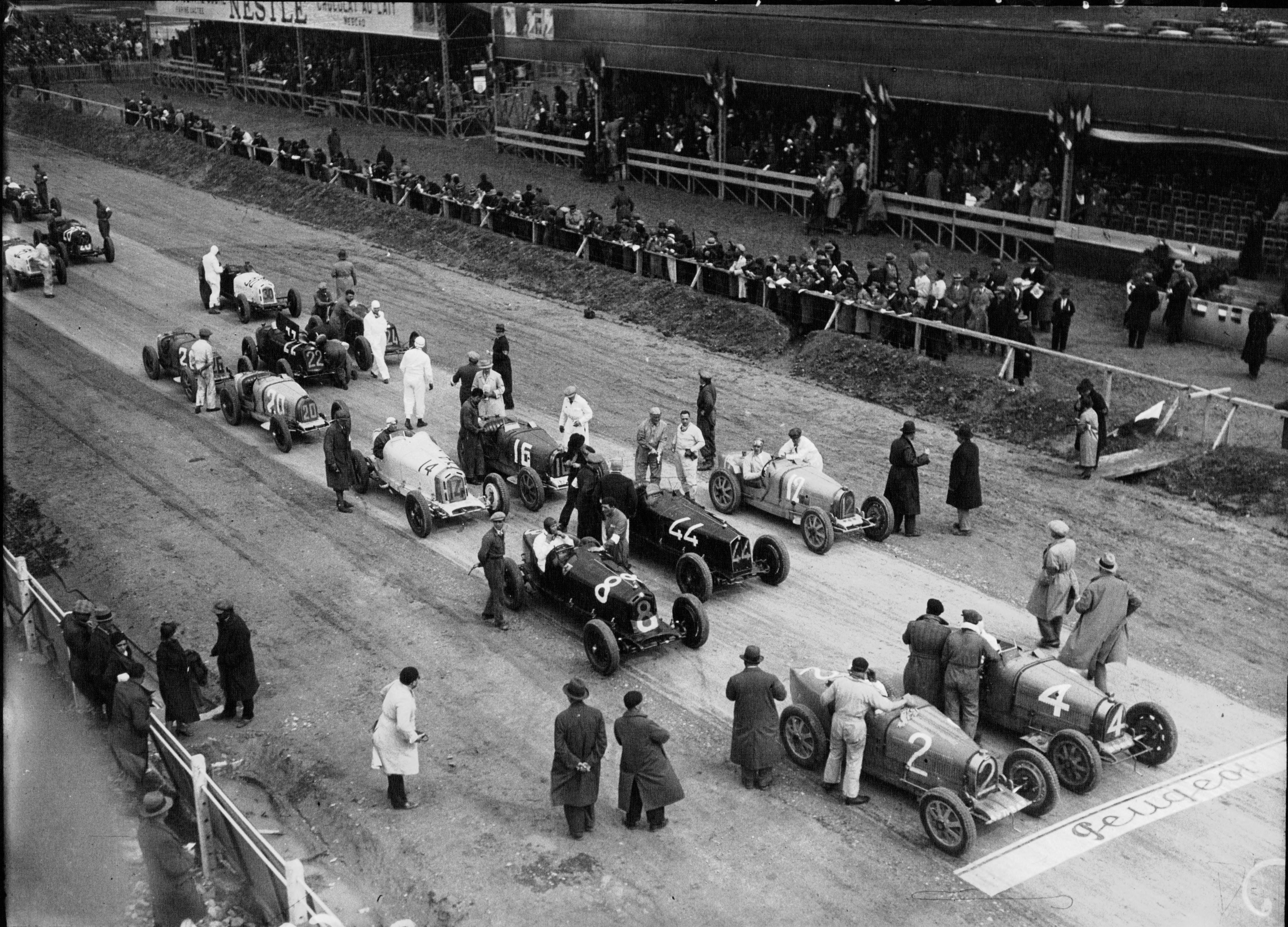
Starting grid at the Tunis GP: Toselli (#2) and Moll (#4) in front

There was a solid field of privateers. Philippe Étancelin and Juan Zanelli had their Alfas, as did the new Swiss Écurie Villars-Waldthausen. Raymond Sommer had a brand-new Maserati 8CM along with Goffredo Zehender with his 8C 2800. They were up against a squadron of Type 51s led by Franco-African Marcel Lehoux. His protégé Guy Moll had an older 35C and Count Stanisław Czaykowski ran a 2-litre 51C. Borzacchini led after the first lap from Czaykowski and Moll. Nuvolari and Varzi who had started from virtually the back of the grid had overtaken a dozen cars and were second and third by the next lap. By the fifth lap, Nuvolari had taken the lead. To great disappointment in the crowd, local hero Lehoux retired on lap six with engine problems while running fourth. Nuvolari put in the fastest lap of the race in on lap 10, now over 30 seconds ahead of Borzacchini who was being hounded by Varzi. They were now two minutes ahead of Étancelin and the rest of the field. The Maseratis of Fagioli and Sommer had been halted by faulty magnetos and when Varzi retired with a broken drive shaft it left the way clear for a comfortable 1-2 victory for the Scuderia Ferrari. The race had been enlivened around two-thirds distance by a sudden thunderstorm that made the smooth tarmac treacherous with the water mixing with the sand and strong gusts of winds. Von Waldthausen lost crucial time when he came to a stop after his team forgot to re-prime the fuel-pump during his fuel-stop. It cost him third place, finishing just seconds behind Zehender's Maserati, two laps adrift of the Alfas.

=== Monaco classic ===
Once again, an invitational list of 20 of Europe's top drivers came to Monte Carlo for the Grand Prix. Ferrari had four entries, with a second bored-out Alfa now, for Borzacchini with Nuvolari, as well as 2.3-litre standard models for Eugenio Siena and Conte Carlo Felice Trossi. The Bugatti team had three cars – Type 51s for Varzi, Dreyfus and “Williams”. There was also saw the first appearance for two other strong privateer pairings: Monegasque Louis Chiron and German Rudi Caracciola had combined to run their 2.3-litre Monzas, while Raymond Sommer had got a second Maserati 8CM for Zehender to race with him. Beside the teams, the field was filled with some of the best European drivers. In lieu of a Maserati works entry, Luigi Fagioli was entered as a privateer with an 8C 3000. Frenchmen Étancelin and Wimille had their Alfa Romeos, and Lehoux and Benoît Falchetto ran Bugattis. From England came Tim Birkin in the Alfa of fellow-Bentley Boy Bernard Rubin, and Earl Howe in his Bugatti. Hungarian László Hartmann had a Type 51 he had bought from the disbanded German Bugatti Team, while Swiss driver Hans Stuber and his Bugatti were denied a start as his entry-application had arrived too late.

Like the previous year, practice was set to be run on Thursday, Friday and Saturday mornings from 6-7am. However, given the narrow nature of the circuit, race organiser and journalist Charles Faroux took the idea used at Indianapolis to set the cars up on the starting grid according to who put in the fastest practice time, rather than by random ballot as races in Europe had traditionally done. It was a process that would soon be adopted across France, then Europe and remains standard to this day. Only eleven cars took Thursday practice. Near the end, Caracciola, having set equal fastest time, crashed heavily at the left-hand Tabac corner on the waterfront when his brakes locked up. He was taken to hospital with multiple fractures in his right leg. The injury kept him out of racing for over a year and the resultant surgery made that leg two inches shorter and left him with a permanent limp. Nuvolari also wrecked his car at Tabac but was uninjured and took over Siena's car. No-one matched the 2m03 times of Chiron and Caracciola until Saturday when Varzi did a 2m02 to take the first pole position.

From the flagfall, Varzi bounded into the lead and within a few laps, a group of five comprising Varzi, Nuvolari, Borzacchini, Lehoux and Étancelin had opened a gap to the field. Chiron had a slow start off the front row and fell back. After 20 of the 100 laps, this group of five was still only five seconds apart, jockeying for position, with Varzi and Nuvolari swapping the lead. This became four when Lehoux had a recurrence of his water-pump issues from practice and retired. Gradually the duel between Varzi and Nuvolari dropped the others off. Étancelin spun at the waterfront chicane and rejoined after 40 seconds in fourth. Nuvolari also slid off the road, but quickly made up the time and by the halfway point the two were barely a second apart again, with Borzacchini and Étancelin less than a minute further back. Dreyfus, back in fifth, was the last car on the lead lap. Étancelin then put in some record-breaking laps to take back third place and after 60 laps the four were all nose-to-tail once again. However, the hard driving had cost the Frenchman, and a broken driveshaft forced his retirement on lap 69. Nuvolari and Varzi kept swapping the lead and with two laps to go, the pair was still inseparable. The lead changed twice on lap 98, and on the next lap Varzi set a new lap record. On the final lap, Varzi burst past on the climb up to the Casino, but although two cars went into the tunnel, only one came out. Varzi's blue Bugatti took the flag, with Borzacchini finishing two minutes behind and Dreyfus a lap back in third. As for Nuvolari? He coasted out of the tunnel with black smoke coming from a fire from a broken oil pipe and a dead engine, and then proceeded to push it to the pits. When a pit crewmember and eager spectators jumped out to help him with his labour, he was disqualified for outside assistance. Right throughout a thrilling race, Varzi and Nuvolari had duelled continually. Both drove very fairly giving each other room to challenge and overtake, only to charge back and retake the position. Nuvolari was absolutely furious with the Ferrari team for letting him down.

There was no chance of a rematch a week later at the Alessandria event when Varzi's entry was refused, as the national body in Rome had not received it in time. This left little competition to the Ferrari team as the top privateers did not want to risk their cars before the lucrative Tunis race a week later. In a processional race, Nuvolari led home teammates Trossi and Brivio in a Ferrari 1-2-3.

=== A Libyan fiasco? ===
The seventh Tripoli Grand Prix proved to be one of the most controversial races in the pre-war era. It has since become shrouded in myth, not least due to Alfred Neubauer's recollections, future team manager at Mercedes-Benz. In looking to promote Italian Tripolitania as a tourist or immigration location and pay for the new track, the out-going provincial governor Emilio de Bono took up the idea of Giovanni Canestrini, editor at the La Gazzetta dello Sport – to hold a national lottery in conjunction with the race. Last held in 1930, that race had been a financial disaster with a small field, on a circuit not spectator-friendly, and had the death of the popular Gastone Brilli-Peri. The organisers now had a purpose-built 13 km circuit at Mellaha. Well over a million tickets were sold at 12 lire each. Eight days prior to the race, 30 tickets were drawn to be randomly assigned to the 30 drivers. The holder of the winning ticket would receive 3 million lire, with second place getting 2 million and third 1 million, while there was 550 000 lire prizemoney for the top three drivers. Many of the best Italian drivers were entered: Ferrari ran 2.3-litre Monzas for Nuvolari, Borzacchini and Mario Tadini. Maserati had two cars, for Fagioli and Campari. Varzi, meanwhile, ran his 2.3-litre Bugatti as a privateer, alongside Carlo Gazzabini and Hungarian László Hartmann. Englishman Tim Birkin brought his new Maserati 8C-3000 joining seven Italian Alfas, including Piero Taruffi, Pietro Ghersi and Renato Balestrero, and the specials of Biondetti and Premoli. A third of the field was made up of 1.5- and 1.1-litre voiturettes. Luigi Castelbarco, Francesco Matrullo and Ferdinando Barbieri had the new Maserati 4CM while others ran the older Tipo 26 against a pair of old Talbot 700s.

It soon became public knowledge that Nuvolari, Borzacchini, Varzi and their respective three ticketholders had arranged a meeting in front of Canestrini. The six agreed to pool, then split, any winnings they would have from the race (with the ticket holders taking a majority share, as the drivers would still have their prize-money as well). Although questionable, it was not illegal, and there was no talk about rigging the race. Of course, upon learning this, many of the drivers, especially Fagioli, Campari, Gazzabini and Birkin, were indignant and furious. The grid was chosen by lot and Birkin and Nuvolari started on the front row with Varzi and Fagioli right behind them. One ticket-holder was already disappointed – Guglielmo Gramonelli had crashed his Monza in practice and would not take the start.

Cazzaniga vaulted from the third row to lead at the start, but at the end of the first lap Birkin led Nuvolari, Campari and Zehender. By lap two Campari had taken the lead and was pulling away. Fagioli pitted to change plugs. At the halfway point Campari pitted with a loose oil pump that soon proved terminal. Birkin also pitted from second for a regular stop although he accidentally burnt his arm on the exhaust when picking up a cigarette lighter. Nuvolari, having inherited the lead, stopped for just twenty seconds and was gone again. Varzi meanwhile had an extra fuel-tank fitted on his Bugatti and did not need to stop. As the race came to its climax, Nuvolari was closing in rapidly and when Varzi had to fiddle switching over to his reserve tank, the Alfa Romeo took the lead. Possibly proof of the rumour that Varzi had won a coin-toss between the two as to who would take the win (or just desperate for the winner's purse), the two drivers battled hard, yelling and shaking their fists at each other! Side-by-side on the last lap, Varzi's Bugatti was able to outbreak the Alfa at the last corner and held on to win by a fifth of a second. This was certainly no show just put on for the crowd. Birkin was third, and when Zehender had retired on the last lap, Attilio Battilana came in fourth in his Maserati voiturette, three laps back, beating the bigger Alfa Monzas of Taruffi, Balestrero and Ghersi.

In a sad postscript, Tim Birkin was to die less than two months later on the eve of Le Mans, the race he had won twice. He had neglected to attend to the burn he received during the race, and it had turned septic. When he then suffered a relapse of the malaria he had first got during the war, his weakened immunity could not fight off the multiple infections.

=== Racing in Germany ===
The next major race in Europe was the Avusrennen, held on the Berlin motorway-circuit. Also held on the same weekend was the Picardy Grand Prix that drew away the top French drivers. To defend German pride and prepare for the new season, the Mercedes-Benz works team was reformed. Still running the SSKL sports-saloon, they had the young Manfred von Brauchitsch back in his streamlined model he had won the previous year's race. Caracciola was to have raced an updated streamlined version, but with his injury team manager Alfred Neubauer called veteran Otto Merz out of retirement. Merz had raced through the '20s and had been the second chauffeur in Sarajevo at the assassination of Archduke Ferdinand in 1914. For the high-speed circuit, Bugatti entered the 5-litre Type 54 for Varzi and Williams. Count Czaykowski also ran his own Type 54 and had recently set a new 1-hour distance record on the AVUS track. Scuderia Ferrari had Nuvolari, Borzacchini and Siena all running their 2.6-litre Alfas, while Chiron and Hartmann had their 2.3-litre versions.

The event started badly on the first day of practice. After a rain-shower at lunchtime, the Mercedes drivers went onto the track to test their rain-setup. For reasons unknown, as he accelerated Merz's car suddenly slewed off the track, got airborne and smashed into a kilometre marker. Merz was thrown clear and never recovered consciousness. The accident cast a pall over the rest of the weekend. On a clear Sunday 170,000 spectators arrived for the race, and in the warm-up voiturette race Pierre Veyron had narrowly won an exciting race from Ernst Burggaller, both running the new Bugatti Type 51A. The main race had eleven starters. At the end of the first lap, it was the Bugattis of Czaykowski and Varzi leading Nuvolari and von Brauchitsch. Chiron retired immediately with a broken engine. Von Brauchitsch would not repeat his victory, bedevilled by tire issues with five pit-stops though the race. At the halfway point, Czaykowski had built an 8-second lead over Varzi. The Bugattis were in their own class, with Nuvolari leading the rest of the field well back. Despite setting a track record on lap 12 and lapping the field, Czaykowski was being caught by Varzi who overtook him on the second to last lap. The Italian held on to win by a fraction of a second. Winning at an average speed of 206.9 km/h, it was the fastest race ever run in Europe. The Ferrari teammates were inseparable and Nuvolari and Borzacchini were credited with an identical time and third equal.

In France, the weekend had continued its tragic theme at the Picardy GP. Earlier, Anne-Cécile Rose-Itier had won the voiturette race in her new Type 51A. Halfway through the main race, Guy Bouriat was duelling for the lead with Philippe Étancelin. While lapping the Alfa Romeo of Julio Villars, Bouriat's Bugatti clipped it and veered off the road. It ploughed into a tree at 150 km/h and burst into flames. Bouriat was killed instantly. It followed another fatal accident in practice when Louis-Aimé Trintignant (older brother of future F1 driver Maurice Trintignant) was killed when he had crashed trying to avoid a gendarme who had stepped onto the track. Along with two deaths at qualification for the Indianapolis 500, it had been a bad weekend in motor-racing.

A week later, the teams met again at the Nürburgring for the Eifelrennen. Once again, Maserati did not appear and Bugatti chose not to enter their big Type 50s for the winding track. Ferrari had Nuvolari, Siena and now Taruffi coming in for Borzacchini. Their main competition would be from Louis Chiron's Alfa Romeo, while Mercedes-Benz entered von Brauchitsch in a standard-bodied SSKL. The Écurie Villars-Waldthausen had their two Alfas, as did the two drivers of Team Pietsch-Jellen, with the field rounded out with privateer Bugattis. Heavy showers during the practice days and race-day morning did nothing to dampen the spirits of 100,000 spectators. By race-start the rain had stopped and the track was drying. The thirteen starters were joined by nine 1.5-litre cars, also doing 15 laps (Howe, Burggaller and Veyron renewing their rivalry), and nine cars in the 800cc class (doing only 12 laps). Chiron led the first lap, until overtaken by Nuvolari on lap two, with von Brauchitsch in third. Thereafter Nuvolari comfortably drove away with the race, with von Brauchitsch second and Taruffi third, after Chiron had to stop several times to fix a leaking fuel tank. Howe won the 1.5-litre class by just a second from Burggaller. Missed by the officials, the two of them completed an extra lap, when the German passed the English Delage, only to be told the disappointing news when he finished.

=== French Grand Prix drama ===
This year the Targa Florio was bedevilled by conflicting dates. Originally, too close to the lucrative Tripoli race to allow time for shipping back across the Mediterranean, it was then rescheduled to the same weekend as the Eifelrennen. Likewise too tight a time for drivers from the races a week earlier, it made for one of the weakest fields in a decade. There were only 14 starters, and Scuderia Ferrari was the only team represented with Borzacchini, Brivio and Guglielmo Carraroli given the 2.3-litre Alfas. The rest of the field were various Alfa Romeo models, aside from three Bugattis. Borzacchini led for three laps, but lost time with a puncture and he then hit a stone wall trying to make up time. Teammate Antonio Brivio then led, racing against Pietro Ghersi until the latter had engine issues. Brivio won by twenty minutes from Renato Balestrero, with Carraroli third. Only six cars finished, although Lettorio Cucinotta's Bugatti was over time and not classified. It would prove to be the last Bugatti to complete a Targa Florio, after the marque (the most successful to date) had won the race five years in a row.

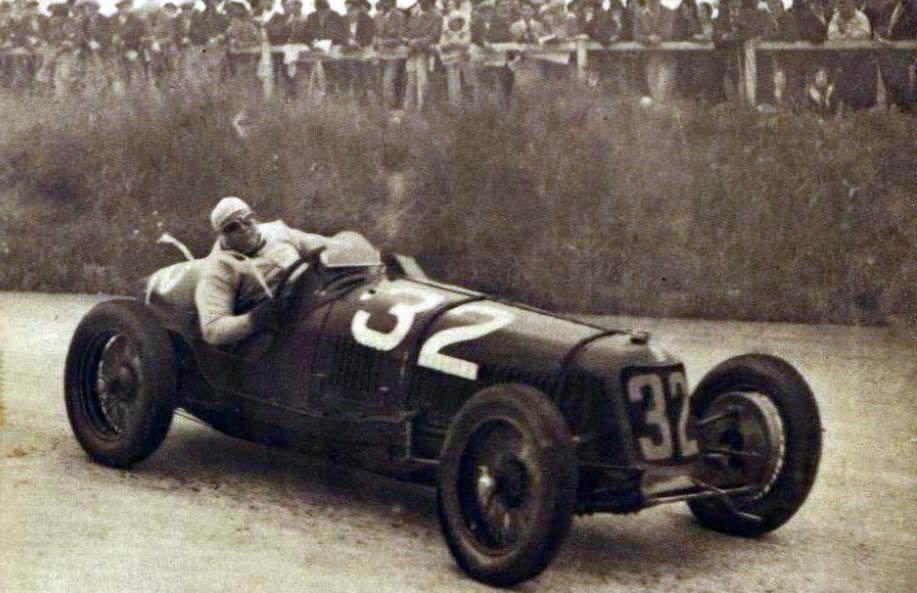
Giuseppe Campari, winner of the French GP

As expected, the blue ribbon French Grand Prix attracted a class field, but it did not include the drivers from the Bugatti works team for their home race. The new Type 59 was not ready yet, and the team also chose not to run their go-to Type 51. In their absence, the Scuderia Ferrari were favourites, with 2.6-litre Monzas for Nuvolari, Borzacchini and Taruffi. Maserati had had a disagreement with Fagioli and neither showed at the event. Therefore, the competition would be from the privateers: Chiron, Wimille, Sommer, Étancelin and Moll had their 2.3-litre Alfas, with Campari and Zehender had 3-litre Maseratis. Without the works team, Bugatti was represented by a handful of Type 51 drivers, including Earl Howe as well Czaykowski with his big Type 54. The ACF had cut the entry fee to just 100 francs, while offering the winner 100,000 francs in prizemoney. Race-day was grey and overcast, but it did not dissuade a huge crowd. In practice, Nuvolari's car had blown its supercharger, and with repairs unable to be completed, he took over Borzacchini's car. He in turn was to drive Taruffi's, but refused. At the end of the first lap, Nuvolari led from Campari who had passed nine cars, with Taruffi third. Chiron and Étancelin were gesticulating wildly to the officials about Taruffi deliberately blocking them from passing, which eventually took them two laps to get by. On lap six (75 km) both Nuvolari and Chiron stopped for tyres, but no sooner had they resumed than the two favourites were out of the race: Nuvolari with a broken differential and Chiron with broken rear axle. Campari now had a 35-second lead over Taruffi and Étancelin, with the rest of the field strung out behind: Zehender, Moll, Czaykowski, Sommer. Campari stopped to change his rear tyres on lap 13 then set a new lap record in his pursuit of the leaders. He finally caught Taruffi and overtook him just before half-distance, on lap 19. Gradually the other cars made their pit-stops. When Taruffi came in, it was team-leader Nuvolari who took the car back out. Campari kept up his strong pace and had a 2-minute lead over Étancelin followed by Moll and Nuvolari. When Moll was delayed with a long tyre-stop, Nuvolari moved to third but was then put out a second time, with a broken rear axle. Only sex cars remained, but it would not be a dull finish: Campari pitted again for tyres, letting the Étancelin into the lead. The Italian was closing in quickly until it began to rain with just 4 laps (50 km) to go. Campari pitted yet again for fresh tyres and the French spectators saw the chance of a home victory. Étancelin had a 23-second lead going into the last lap but his clutch was destroyed and he could no longer change gear. Campari caught him and took the win by 52 seconds. George Eyston's reliable run netted him third place. After the race, a protest was lodged that Campari had clearly been push-started after his first stop. However, rather than being disqualified, as regulations demanded, he was only hit with a token 1000 franc fine, 1% of his latest winnings. The sporting press were very derisive of the officials' decision.

By now, tensions were high at Scuderia Ferrari. Nuvolari was fed up with the Alfa Romeo unreliability – the transmission unable to cope with the extra power of the bored out 2.6-litre engine. Young Taruffi had quickly earned the ire of Enzo Ferrari, beating his best riders in bike events taking the considerable prizemoney as a privateer.

=== Races in June and July ===
Two weeks later, the Penya Rhin Grand Prix was held on the new Montjuïc circuit in Barcelona. It was a street course going around the Montjuïc hill with the World Exhibition buildings and the proposed Olympic Stadium. Last run ten years earlier, this new iteration attracted a class field. Lehoux led initially but had to stop for new tyres. Nuvolari, still with Ferrari, then dominated the race until the halfway mark when he was waylaid by carburettor problems. This now put Zanelli's Alfa into a strong lead, with the Bugatti of Lehoux making up time in second, chased by Wimille and Portuguese driver Vasco Someiro. Nuvolari had lost eleven minutes and five laps in the pits and thrilled the crowd with his incomparable flair, retrieving two of those laps back. Although he only finished on seven cylinders, the Chilean Zanelli took a good victory, almost a lap ahead of Someiro after Lehoux was delayed again with gearbox problems.

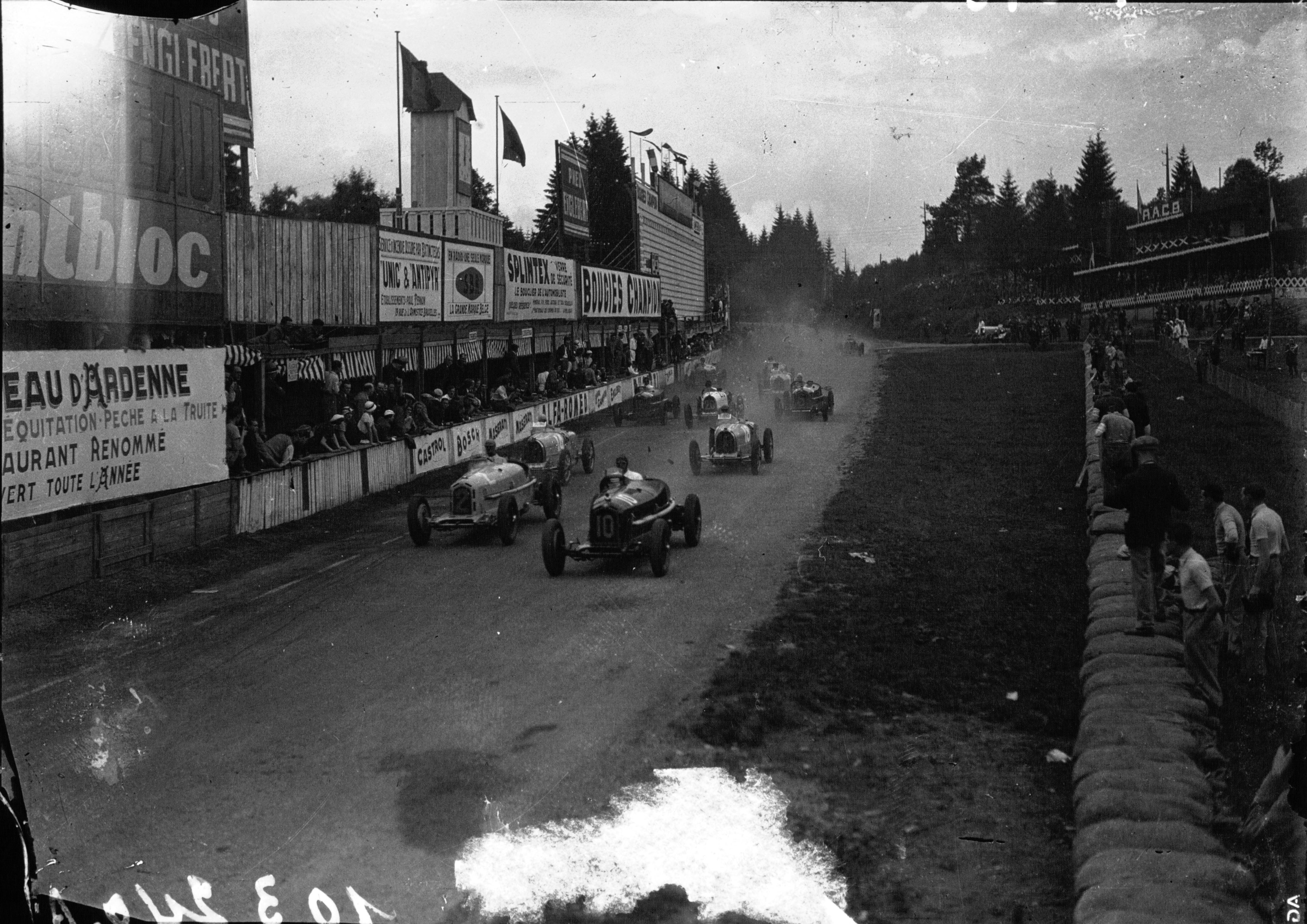
Start of the Belgian GP at Spa: Alfas of Borzacchini & Chiron lead Bugattis of Varzi and Dreyfus

The Marne GP at Rheims attracted most of the participants from the recent French Grand Prix. Campari drove for Maserati and Nuvolari for Ferrari. The Villars-Waldthausen and Pietsch-Jellen team-pairs were also present along with the top privateers: Lehoux, Wimille, Zehender, Moll, Sommer and Étancelin. Anglo-American Whitney Straight made his first Grand Prix start, with an old Maserati Tipo 26. For the second time in Europe, after Monaco, the grid would be decided by the fastest practice times, except that local tradition put the previous year's winner on pole. This put Lehoux on pole, but to prove a point, he also set the fastest time ahead of the Maseratis of Campari and Zehender. Nuvolari had arrived late and could not set a time, and so started from the back. Lehoux led the first lap and in a stunning opening lap, Nuvolari was up to second and took the lead on the next lap. He set about building a lead and by lap 13 (quarter-distance) had a 40-second gap to Lehoux and Étancelin. Campari (who had got up to second) and Zehender had both retired after being injured by flying stones. But an abysmal Ferrari pit-stop for Nuvolari to take on fuel and tyres cost him almost three minutes, down to fourth nearly a lap down on Étancelin. Wimille and Moll were fighting over second place, while Lehoux had fallen back with a failing gearbox. Once again, Nuvolari put in a huge effort, and on lap 31 finally overtook Moll for second still 1m 46s behind. Wimille had stopped to refuel but was two laps ahead of Sommer back in fifth. But once again, Nuvolari was betrayed by the Alfa Romeo rear axle drive, coasting to a halt at Geux corner. Then when Étancelin took two minutes to pit for fuel and tyres with ten laps to go, it gave the lead to Moll. Étancelin set about chasing down the young Algerian and with three laps to go it was Étancelin that passed the line first, just four seconds ahead of Wimille while Moll had to pit for a splash of fuel. Stalling the car, his pit crew gave him a push-start that meant disqualification (Moll was furious after Campari had been allowed to get away with a similar crime at the French Grand Prix only three weeks' earlier). Étancelin held on to head Wimille off by barely a car's length. Sommer inherited third, while Straight was the only other finisher, six laps back.

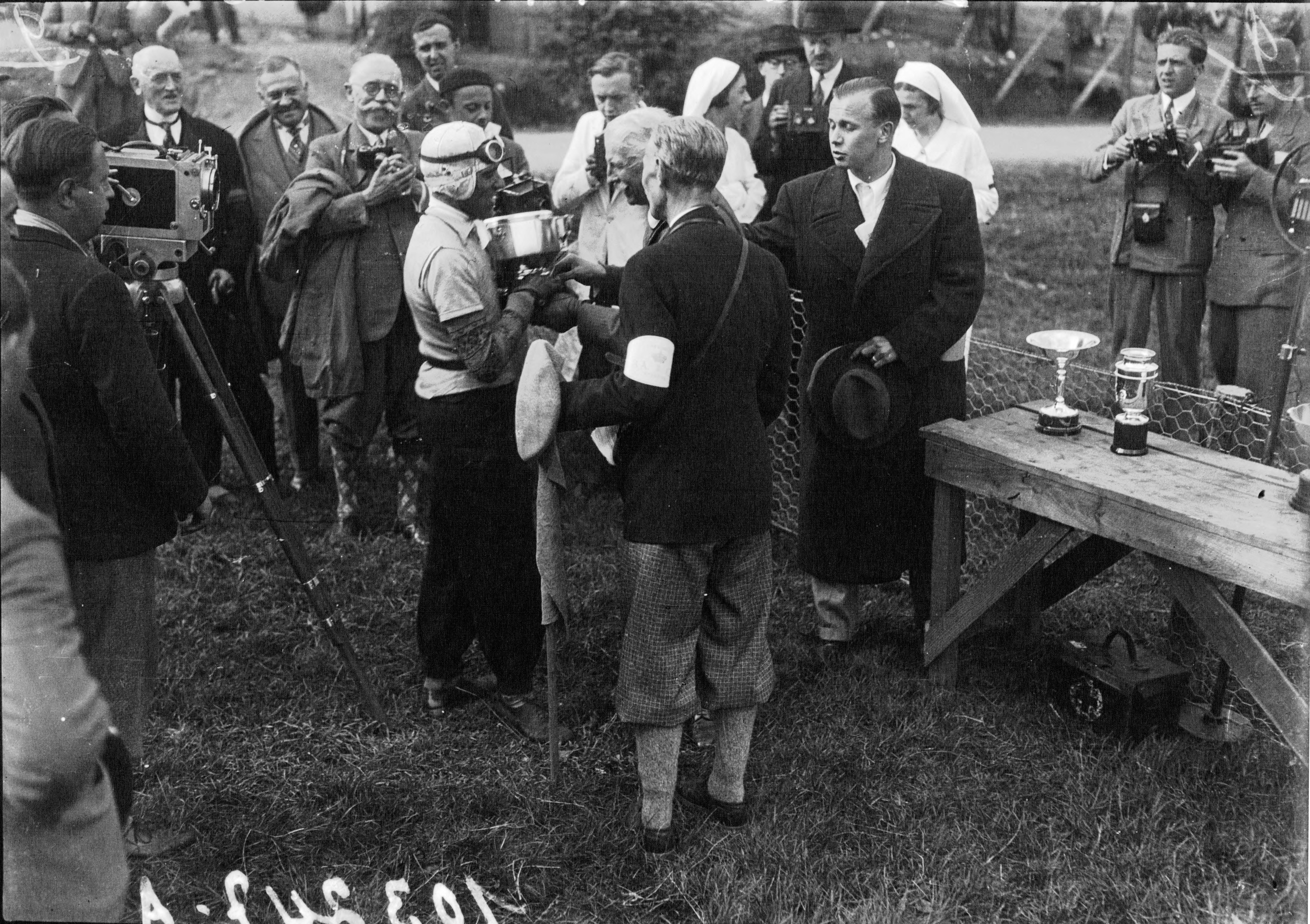
Prizegiving for the Belgian Grand Prix

For Nuvolari, a third axle-failure was the last straw and he immediately negotiated with Ernesto Maserati to take the injured Campari's seat for the Belgian Grand Prix, held the next weekend. A small elite field was assembled for that event. Nuvolari was joined by Zehender, in the Maserati monoposto. The other big news was the unveiling of the sleek new Bugatti Type 59, to be raced by Varzi. Team-mates Williams and Dreyfus would run Type 51s. Ferrari had Borzacchini and Siena in the 2.6-litre Alfa. Privateer support for them came from Chiron, Sommer and Moll while Lehoux had his Type 51 and the Swiss driver Edgard Markiewicz filled out the field in an older Type 35B. Having just won the Spa 24 Hours endurance race held the weekend before, Chiron set the early pace in practice. Nuvolari put the Maserati through its paces then headed over to the nearby Imperia workshops to strengthen the chassis. Varzi did several sighting-laps in the Type 59 but never got it up to speed. The brakes were poor and the road-holding not up to scratch. He therefore decided to abandon the new model and drive a Type 51 in the race instead. Once again, Nuvolari started at the back of the field, and once again he quickly moved up to take the lead, this time by the end of the first lap. After 100 km (7 laps) he had a 17-second lead over the battling Alfas of Borzacchini and Chiron, followed 45-seconds back by Varzi, Lehoux, Zehender and Dreyfus. Williams and Sommer were being plagued by engine issues, needing many stops. At the halfway point, Chiron led from Borzacchini, while Nuvolari had stopped for fuel and tyres and was now third. But within a few laps both the Alfas had retired with mechanical problems, giving the lead back to Nuvolari. He kept up his pace and this time was not thwarted by unreliability to take the win. Varzi had stopped on the last lap, changing a tyre in a remarkable fourteen seconds, and hung on to finish just three seconds ahead of teammate Dreyfus.

=== Tumult at Ferrari ===
After successful ice races, in August Sweden hosted its first international summer race. Held on a large 30 km track in the far south of the country near Malmö, it attracted the attention of Louis Chiron and the Scuderia Ferrari, who sent Antonio Brivio. However, the race had a tragic start on the first lap. The Mercedes SSK of Börje Dahlin, starting on the front row, was vying with Sven-Olof Bennström's Ford. Approaching an off-camber corner, neither was giving way. The SSK slid wide, jumped a ditch and ploughed through a hedge. Meanwhile, Dahlin's mechanic, Erik Lafrenz, had chosen to leap out rather than be crushed under the car. Bennström spun his Ford, running over the unfortunate Lafrenz and then rolled. The car burst into flames and the driver was thrown out, getting a serious head concussion. The rest of the field arrived unsighted and veered left and right to avoid the fatally wounded mechanic in the middle of the road. A total of seven cars were wrecked (including Chiron's) and a house burned down. Three drivers were taken to hospital while Lafrenz died at the scene. It was almost incidental that Brivio won the race.

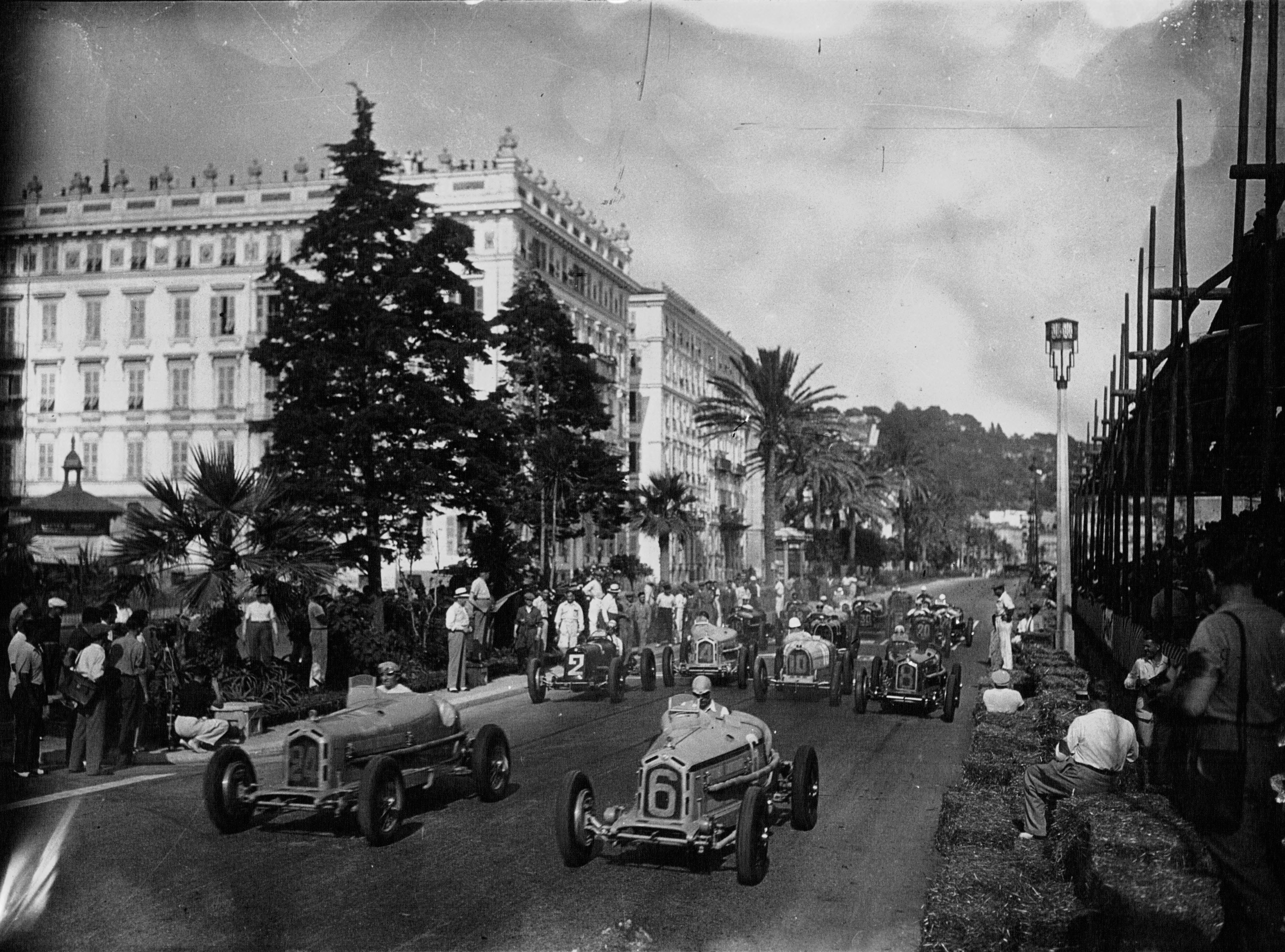
Start of the Nice GP: Etancelin and Wimille in front

Nuvolari's situation had erupted very publicly at the end of July. He and Enzo Ferrari were flinging accusations about mutual breach of contract in the team. Ferrari wrote an open letter to the Italian sports-newspaper La Gazzetta dello Sport. A tribunal was convened by the Italian racing federation to investigate. The net effect was that Nuvolari, and his good friend Borzacchini, left Ferrari. Nuvolari, now having bought Raymond Sommer's Maserati, had followed up his success at Spa with consecutive wins at Montenero and Nice. The latter had been the third event of the year with starting positions decided by practice times. Luigi Fagioli, already disgruntled by his treatment at Maserati was furious when his great rival, Nuvolari, was courted by the factory. He showed his dissatisfaction by walking out and going straight to Ferrari as their new team leader. Campari had been given the new 2-litre Maserati 4CM-2000 in those recent races. Unable to compete for the outright win in the smaller car, he followed Fagioli soon after. In turn, Alfa Romeo, alarmed at the loss of pre-eminence of their cars, finally heeded Ferrari's calls and released their mothballed Tipo B cars to the team. The impact was immediately seen at the next race, the Coppa Acerbo on the fast Pescara Circuit.

After the upheaval of the past fortnight, it was a completely new driver line-up that appeared on the grid. With strong factory support, Nuvolari, Zehender and Borzacchini all entered as Maserati privateers. In the shadow of the recent fracas, Piero Taruffi was also becoming disillusioned at Ferrari and had bought a Maserati 8CM. To make a point, Ferrari entered an impressive eight cars, although in the end only two arrived. However, new team-drivers Fagioli and Campari now sported the all-conquering Tipo B as their mounts. Bugatti were almost an afterthought, with Varzi and Dreyfus leading a squadron of private entries. Ferrari stirred the pot even more in practice when he offered Varzi some test laps in the Tipo B to possibly set up a future team transfer. Promising to be the most exciting race of the year, enormous crowds lined the vast 25 km circuit. Started by the Duke of Aosta, Campari took the lead from pole position, chased by the Bugattis of Varzi, Howe and Dreyfus. By the end of the first lap, Nuvolari had charged through the field and had a narrow lead over Campari, followed by Taruffi, Fagioli and Varzi. The leading pair continued to trade places for the next hour pulling away from the rest of the field, until by the fifth lap Nuvolari was finally able to build a small gap. Then on the ninth lap, Campari made an uncharacteristic error and crashed at the Spoltore corner. He was thrown out when his car rolled, but fortunately only received light injuries. A lap later, René Dreyfus had to retire after being hit in the head by a bird. Badly stunned, and travelling at full speed, he managed to safely stop his car. With his nearest rival out, Nuvolari could ease off but coming onto the twelfth and final lap, he suddenly lost all speed. The universal joint had seized and by the time it had been loosened in the pits, Fagioli was past and gone. It was a lucky victory for Fagioli, with Nuvolari slipping two minutes back and just a few seconds ahead of Taruffi. Varzi was a distant fourth over four minutes back, showing up the growing obsolescence of Bugatti.

Fagioli won again, at the next race, the minor Comminges Grand Prix. Many of the same entrants came to the very fast Miramas oval for the second Marseilles Grand Prix. Fagioli was joined by Louis Chiron both now driving the Tipo B. Maserati had Nuvolari, Zehender (8CMs) and Borzacchini (still on last year's 8C-3000) while Bugatti supplied the big 5-litre Type 54 to Dreyfus (who drove it direct from the factory at Molsheim). The pair of Raymond Sommer and Jean-Pierre Wimille had their Alfa Romeo Monzas, as did the Swiss Villars-Waldthausen team, Étancelin and Moll. Once again, as was happening in French races, the grid was decided by practice time. Nuvolari set the fastest time by three seconds, with Borzacchini, Moll and Wimille joining him on the front row. Moll was fastest off the line, but Nuvolari overtook him on lap five. On the tight oval a breakaway group formed of Nuvolari, Chiron, Dreyfus, Fagioli and Zehender and the lead changed back and forth in the slipstreaming battle. While this group battled for the lead, on lap 34 Baron Horst von Waldthausen crashed and rolled his Alfa Romeo after a puncture. With severe internal injuries and a broken leg, the 26-year old died later in hospital. Around the halfway mark most drivers started stopping for fuel and tyres. On lap 56, a wheel came off the Bugatti of Dreyfus 200 km/h, and it was only by his skill and luck that he avoided a serious accident. Nuvolari had a narrow lead over Fagioli until the Alfa pitted, with Chiron a minute back in third. However, yet again, Nuvolari was denied victory because of a broken rear axle, retiring on lap 80. Although Chiron had to stop for a rear tyre change, he took the win after Fagioli needed a fuel top-up with five laps to go. Moll finished third, four laps behind the two Ferrari cars.

=== Tragedy at Monza ===
The Italian Grand Prix was usually held in July but this year was postponed to September (to run in conjunction with the Monza GP) to complete renovations to the pits and large new grandstand. An excellent field was on prospect for the international event. These did not include the Bugatti team who still had not got the Type 59 ready to race. However, there was Nuvolari and Zehender for Maserati, supported by Taruffi. Scuderia Ferrari had the Tipo B for Fagioli and Chiron and the 2.6-litre Monza for Siena and Brivio. There were a number of privateer Alfas as well, including Lehoux, Moll, Ghersi and Balestrero. Earl Howe and Gaupillat had their Bugattis, while Campari and Czaykowski chose not to start to concentrate instead on the Monza Grand Prix that followed later in the afternoon. An early shower on Sunday morning dampened the track for the 80,000 spectators and 19 starters. Nuvolari led the first lap but Fagioli caught and passed him on the front straight next time around. This set the tone for the race, with the lead group of these two chased by Taruffi, Chiron and Zehender; Ferrari versus Maserati. Nuvolari got a puncture on lap 17, but in a lightning-fast pitstop was able to get back out in fourth. Chiron suffered the same five laps later. Taruffi skidded three times on the curved banking, and on the last he hit the inside wall smashing his front suspension. At the half-way point, Chiron led Fagioli by just three seconds, with Nuvolari a further 20 seconds back. Siena, Lehoux, Ghersi and Zehender were already a lap behind. When the two Alfa monoposti pitted for fuel and tyres Nuvolari was back in the lead, until he too had to pit. However, Chiron's day ended on lap 40 with a broken valve as he coasted to a stop. So with ten laps to go it was Nuvolari with a 30-second lead on Fagioli. Victory again looked assured until, with two laps to go, Nuvolari came into the pit with a puncture. Fagioli raced past to take a fortuitous victory from Nuvolari with Zehender finishing third two laps behind.

The international Grand Prix was run in the morning with the local Monza Grand Prix scheduled for the afternoon. As before, it was run as a succession of heats leading up to a 22-lap final. Unlike the race in the morning, this event was held only on the oval banking. A number of the drivers from the morning race were once again on the entry list, although Nuvolari, Zehender, Siena and Gaupillat all chose to withdraw. An unusual entry was Conde Carlo Felice Trossi who had an American Duesenberg run by the Scuderia Ferrari.

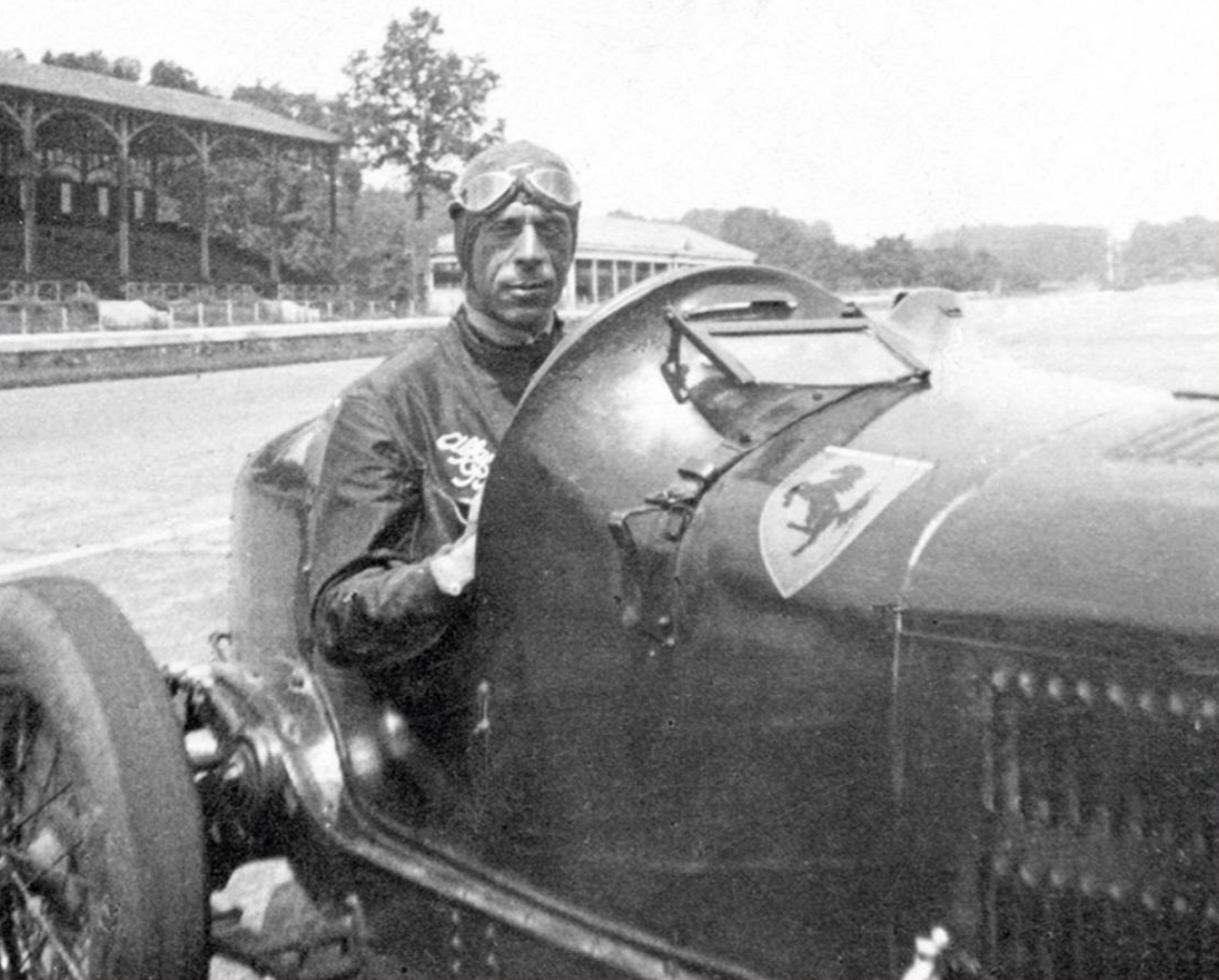
Pietro Ghersi set the fastest lap at the ill-fated Monza GP

A slight shower skimmed across the track just before the 2pm start of the first heat. Lined up eight abreast on the front straight, it was Luigi Premoli who led the opening lap in his BMP special. However, it soon became a contest between Czaykowski's 5-litre Bugatti and Trossi's Duesenberg. That ended on lap 8 when the Duesenberg lost a piston, spilling oil on the approach to the banked South Curve. Guy Moll hit the oil at 180 km/h and spinning wildly, did three revolutions, amazingly without hitting the walls. He got going again and finished second behind Czaykowski. After the race, Moll highlighted the danger at the South Curve with a large pool of oil near the top of the banking. As the cars were wheeled out for the second heat, the marshals dropped sand on the patch and tried to sweep it away. The two favourites were Campari (Alfa Romeo Borzacchini (Maserati). The 41-year old Campari had got a rousing welcome by the spectators as he had announced in the morning he would be retiring after this race to continue in a career as an opera baritone. After the drivers had been alerted to the oil on the track, the heat was started. Coming to the South Curve on the first lap Campari overtook Borzacchini and, possibly to avoid the oil, pulled sharply to the left to go high onto the banking. Losing control, he slammed into the upper railing and rolled down the banking. Borzacchini, right behind him, had nowhere to go and flew over the wall, as did Carlo Castelbarco. Ferdinando Barbieri had just enough time to dive low for the infield, dodging the carnage as did the three other cars. Campari was crushed under his car and died immediately, while Borzacchini was critically injured and died an hour later in hospital. Castelbarco, amazingly, escaped with only mild injuries. It was incidental that Renato Balestrero won the heat. Although blame was initially put on the inadequate oil clean-up, the accident did not happen on the oil. More likely was that there had been a three-hour race run on the same day and that neither Campari nor Borzacchini had competed in that so they would have been unused to the accumulated greasiness of the conditions and perhaps did not show due caution. Tied in with this was the standard practice of fitting smooth tyres and removing the front brakes for racing on high-speed ovals. Extensive discussions were held before the third heat as the officials clearly re-stated the risk and the track conditions. Many drivers were unhappy but the organisers made them sign legal wavers accepting their personal risk. After two hours' delay, the third heat was held. Lehoux in his Bugatti won from the Alfa of Pietro Ghersi. The latter had been leading but lost time after skidding on the greasy oil-patch.

From the start of the final, Whitney Straight took the lead in his older Maserati Tipo 26M. Czaykowski's big Bugatti picked off the others one at a time and he took the lead on lap 4, closely followed by Lehoux. Then on lap 8, there was further tragedy. A pillar of smoke marked where Czaykowski had crashed. Losing control about 50 metres further than the previous accident he had also gone over the banking wall. Unluckily hitting a rock with his head he was killed instantly as the car rolled and burst into flames. This time the race was soon stopped, running only 14 of the 22 scheduled laps. Lehoux won a hollow victory just ahead of Guy Moll.

Thereafter, September 10 was named the "Black Day of Monza". It was the end of the Monza Grand Prix as a major event and also the banked oval as a complete part of the racetrack. It added to Monza's reputation of a deadly track, that in ten years already had killed drivers Ugo Sivocci, Louis Zborowski, Luigi Arcangeli and the accident in 1928 that killed Emilio Materassi and 27 spectators.Nuvolari was affected by the deaths of his friends and kept a vigil with their widows overnight.

=== End of the season ===
A week later, the fourth Masaryk Circuit had promised a top field, but the entry list was fragmented after the recent events. Scuderia Ferrari had Chiron and Fagioli in the Tipo B again, while Brivio had a Monza. For the twisty circuit, Bugatti sent Dreyfus with a Type 51 (replacing Varzi who had an eye injury), while Mercedes-Benz had an SSKL for von Brauchitsch. The privateers were led by Lehoux and Hartmann in Bugattis, and Moll, Pietsch, Wimille and Balestrero driving the Alfa Romeo Monza. Local hopes were carried by Czech drivers Jan Kubiček and Zdenĕk Pohl. In conjunction with the main class, there was also a voiturette category that brought together Burggaller and Veyron for another contest. They would be challenged by Hugh Hamilton in his little 750cc MG. Sensibly, the organisers declared that once a class winner completed the race, the remaining cars would then be flagged off, rather than having to keep circulating to cover the full distance as was typical for European races.

Gentle overnight rain continued through the morning of race-day but over 100,000 spectators arrived. The two classes were raced together, starting five minutes apart. Chiron leapt from pole position to build a steady lead, while Lehoux held up the rest of the field on the narrow roads. Dreyfus and Fagioli stopped every other lap with engine issues and by lap 5 Chiron had a big margin over Pietsch, Moll and Hartmann. The rain stopped about mid-race and although the track dried in most places it was still very damp and slippery going through the forest sections. On lap 9, Pietsch pushed too hard and lost control. The car rolled and ended in a ditch throwing the driver out. Covered with mud but uninjured, Pietsch calmly lit a cigarette to watch the rest of the race. Moll, now up to second, crashed out on lap 11, hitting a road marker and also ended up in a ditch. Also tossed out he suffered just a bruised knee. Fagioli was back on the charge again, setting the fastest lap, but could not catch Chiron who won the race for the third time. In the voiturette class, Burggaller won a battle of attrition as Veyron, Landi and Hamilton all crashed out from the leading group. Hamilton's car somersaulted three times and left the driver unconscious. Papers even published his obituary, although he was not otherwise seriously injured and made a full recovery. Significantly it would be the last time the Bugatti works team entered its 2.3-litre Type 51 workhorse, and likely the last appearance of the Mercedes SSKL, as both were to be replaced by newer models.

The last major event of the year was the Spanish Grand Prix. It had last been held in 1927, but with the recent political upheaval in the country, the San Sebastián race had assumed the position as the country's premium race. However, this year the race attracted a top-class field including the long-awaited race debut of the new Bugatti Type 59. Two cars were present, for Varzi, Dreyfus and Williams, with Divo on hand as a reserve driver. Nuvolari, Zehender and Taruffi had the Maserati 8CM monoposto and Ferrari had Fagioli and Chiron in the Tipo B (with Antonio Brivio as their reserve driver) and Siena in a Monza. Jean-Pierre Wimille ran his Monza for the Sommer team, along with other Alfa privateers “Phi-Phi” Étancelin and Juan Zanelli, while Marcel Lehoux had his successful Bugatti Type 51. It was a wet week for practice. The Bugatti works drivers were instructed not to run over a 100 km/h lap average to not give away any pre-race secrets (when Nuvolari was recording a 142 km/h average as the fastest practice lap). However, Williams spun in the rain and ended up hitting a tree sideways so he would not take the start. Raceday was overcast but dry and the fourteen starters took a rolling start of the 30-lap race. Drawn by random ballot, Nuvolari and Chiron were both on the back row of the grid, yet by the second lap they had carved their way through the field to be first and second respectively. Once again, Nuvolari was setting the pace and regularly breaking the old lap-record. By lap 10 he led Chiron by over a minute, himself several minutes ahead of Fagioli, Taruffi and Varzi. Taruffi then lost time with ignition problems. The leading two pitted for tyres and fuel on lap 17 but two laps later the heavens opened to a torrential downpour. Taruffi went off the road, hitting a tree but was uninjured. Then further sensation when Nuvolari aquaplaned off the track. His car ploughed into the roadside embankment, rolled twice and hit a rock. The Italian was hurled from the car onto the road, badly spraining his wrist and receiving a bad cut to his leg. He commented later that it was the hardest impact he had taken in racing. This left Chiron with a comfortable lead and he eased back for the conditions and to save the car. His lap times dropped from 7 minutes to about 9 minutes and he coasted to another unexpected, but welcome, Alfa Romeo victory. Team-mate Fagioli was second, while Lehoux overtook Varzi to finish third, over twenty minutes back. The performance of the new Type 59 was underwhelming, down on power, that would give team manager “Meo” Costantini a lot of work to do in the close-season.

The driver of the season was again Tazio Nuvolari. Despite his speed and ability, the results show him often thwarted by car unreliability, leading to mid-season team frustration and intrigue. However, it was a far better story when he applied himself to sports-car racing and in a remarkable series of results, he won the Mille Miglia, Le Mans 24-hour & Tourist Trophy, a unique treble, all in the same year. It had been a particularly grim year with a large number of accidents causing serious injury and death, from Caracciola's season-ending injuries at Monaco to the triple-fatality at Monza. Nine notable European drivers were killed and a similar number badly injured through the season. In the United States, at the Indianapolis 500, five drivers or mechanics had been killed in three crashes. This was the final year of the unregulated Formula Libre, and the time of extremely long races. Aside from superchargers, there had been very little technical or chassis development. Bugatti had essentially used the same body-design through the period. However, with the exciting races of this season, the motor-racing fraternity eagerly awaited what would be produced by manufacturers for the new 750kg formula.

== Race results ==
=== Drivers' Race Results ===
Pos	Driver	Team	TUN (Tunisia)	MON (Monaco)	TRI (Italian Libya)	AVS (Germany)	EIF (Germany)	FRA (France)	MAR (France)	BEL (Belgium)	NIC (France)	CAC (Italy)	MRS (France)	ITA (Italy)	MNZ (Italy)	MSK (Czechoslovakia)	ESP (Spain)	Pts
	(Italy) Tazio Nuvolari	Scuderia Ferrari; Officine Alfieri Maserati	1	DSQ	2	3=	**1**	Ret	Ret	1	**1**	2	**Ret**	2			Ret	
	(Monaco) Louis Chiron	Scuderia C/C; Scuderia Ferrari		4		Ret	4	Ret		**Ret**			1	Ret		**1**	1	
	(Italy) Achille Varzi	Automobiles Ettore Bugatti	Ret	**1**	1	1				2	Ret	4					4	
	(Italy) Luigi Fagioli	Officine Alfieri Maserati; Scuderia Ferrari	Ret	Ret	Ret						4	1	2	1		2	2	
	(France) Philippe Étancelin	Private Entry	Ret	Ret				2	1		Ret		Ret				Ret	
	(French Algeria) Marcel Lehoux	Private Entry	Ret	Ret				Ret	**Ret**	4	5		6	4	1	Ret	3	
	(Italy) Giuseppe Campari	Officine Alfieri Maserati; Scuderia Ferrari			Ret			1	Ret		8	**Ret**			†			
	(Italy) Baconin Borzacchini	Scuderia Ferrari; Officine Alfieri Maserati	2	2	Ret	3=		DNS		Ret		Ret	Ret		†			
	(France) René Dreyfus	Automobiles Ettore Bugatti		3						3	2	Ret	Ret			4	6	
	(French Algeria) Guy Moll	Private Entry	Ret					5	DSQ	Ret	3		3	8	2	Ret		
	(France) Jean-Pierre Wimille	Private Entry; R. Sommer		Ret				Ret	2		Ret		4			3	5	
	(Germany) Manfred von Brauchitsch	Private Entry				6	2									Ret		
	(Poland) / (France) Stanislas Czaykowski	Private Entry	Ret			2		Ret							†			
	(Italy) Piero Taruffi	Scuderia Ferrari; Officine Alfieri Maserati			5		3	Ret				3		Ret			Ret	
	(Italy) Goffredo Zehender	R. Sommer; Officine Alfieri Maserati	3	6	Ret			Ret	Ret	Ret	Ret	Ret	5	3			Ret	
	(France) Raymond Sommer	R. Sommer	Ret	Ret				4	3	7	Ret		(4)					
	(United Kingdom) Tim Birkin	Private Entry		Ret	3				(†)									
	(United Kingdom) George Eyston	Private Entry						3										
	(Italy) Felice Bonetto	Private Entry													3			
	(United States) / (United Kingdom) Whitney Straight	Private Entry							4			Ret		11	4			
	(Germany) / (Switzerland) Karl von Waldthausen	Ecurie Villars-Waldthausen	4				Ret	6	Ret				†					
	(Italy) Attilio Battilana	Private Entry			4										Ret	Ret		
	(Kingdom of Hungary) László Hartmann	Private Entry	DNS	8	9	7	5						7			5		
	(Italy) Eugenio Siena	Scuderia Ferrari		Ret		Ret	7			5		Ret		5			Ret	
	(Italy) Renato Balestrero	Private Entry			6									9	5	8		
	(United Kingdom) Earl Howe	Private Entry		Ret				**Ret**			Ret	5		12	**Ret**			
	(France) Benoît Falchetto	Private Entry	5	Ret													Ret	
	(Italy) Carlo Felice Trossi	Scuderia Ferrari		5											Ret			
	(Austria) Charles “Charly” Jellen	Private Entry				5	Ret		Ret		Ret							
	(Germany) Paul Pietsch	Private Entry	7				6		Ret							Ret		
	(United Kingdom) William Grover-Williams	Automobiles Ettore Bugatti		7		Ret				6							DNS	
	(Italy) “Rover” (Lelio; Pellegrini Quarantotti)	Private Entry			Ret							6		13	Ret			
	(France) Frédéric Toselli	Private Entry	6		(†)													
	(United Kingdom) Brian Lewis	Private Entry									6							
	(Italy) Luigi Castelbarco	Private Entry												6	Ret			
	(Italy) Clemente Biondetti	Private Entry			Ret				Ret					Ret	6			
	(Czechoslovakia) Zdenĕk Pohl	Private Entry														6		
Pos	Driver	Team	TUN (Tunisia)	MON (Monaco)	TRI (Italian Libya)	AVS (Germany)	EIF (Germany)	FRA (France)	MAR (France)	BEL (Belgium)	NIC (France)	CAC (Italy)	MRS (France)	ITA (Italy)	MNZ (Italy)	MSK (Czechoslovakia)	ESP (Spain)	Pts

Bold font indicates starting on pole position, while italics show the driver of the race's fastest lap.
Only those drivers with a best finish of 6th or better, or a fastest lap, are shown. Sources:

=== Manufacturers' Race Results ===
Pos	Manufacturer	TUN (Tunisia)	MON (Monaco)	TRI (Libya)	AVS (Germany)	EIF (Germany)	FRA (France)	MAR (France)	BEL (Belgium)	NIC (France)	CAC (Italy)	MRS (France)	ITA (Italy)	MNZ (Italy)	MSK (Czechoslovakia)	ESP (Spain)
	(Italy) Alfa Romeo	1	2	2	3	1	2	1	5	3	1	1	1	2	1	1
	(France) Bugatti	5	1	1	1	5	Ret	Ret	2	2	4	7	10	1	4	3
	(Italy) Maserati	3	6	3			1	4	1	1	2	5	2	4		Ret
	(Germany) Mercedes-Benz				6	2									Ret	
	(United Kingdom) Talbot			Ret												

Colour	Result	Points
Gold	Winner	1
Silver	2nd place	2
Bronze	3rd place	3
Green	4th place	4
Blue	5th place	5
Purple	Other finisher / Not classified / Retired	6
Black	Disqualified	7
White	Did not start (DNS)	7
Blank	Did not arrive	7

Citations
