= 1932 Nice Circuit Race =

1932 Nice Grand Prix
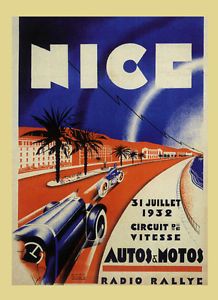

Race details
- Date: 31 July 1932
- Official name: I Circuit de Vitesse de Nice; I Grand Prix de Nice
- Location: Nice, France
- Course: Street circuit
- Course length: 3.229 km (2.006 miles)
- Distance: 15 laps, 48.428 km (30.09 miles)

Fastest lap
Drivers	(France) René Dreyfus	Bugatti
	(France) Raymond Sommer	Alfa Romeo
- Time: 1:58.0 (98.5 km/h)

Podium
First	(Monaco) Louis Chiron	Bugatti
Second	(France) Raymond Sommer	Alfa Romeo
Third	(France) René Dreyfus	Bugatti

The 1932 Nice Circuit Race (officially the I Circuit de Vitesse de Nice) was a Grand Prix motor race held at Nice on 31 July 1932. The 15 lap final followed 2 heats of 10 laps and a third heat of 15 laps.

== Classification ==
Pos	No	Driver	Car	Laps	Time/Retired	Diff
1		(Monaco) Louis Chiron	Bugatti T51	15	30:19.6 (95.81 km/h)	–
2		(France) Raymond Sommer	Alfa Romeo 8C	15	30:23.0	+3.4 sec
3		(France) René Dreyfus	Bugatti T51	15	30:29.0	+9.4 sec
4		(Italy) Goffredo Zehender	Alfa Romeo 8C	15	31.14.0	+54.4 sec
5		(France) Louis Trintignant	Bugatti T35C	14		+1 lap
DNF		(France) Benoît Falchetto	Bugatti T35B		Accelerator	
