= Pat Fairfield =

British racing driver (1907–1937)

- Born: Patrick Greenway Fairfield; 26 November 1907 Liverpool, Lancashire, England
- Died: 21 June 1937 (aged 29) Le Mans, Sarthe, France

Champ Car career
- 1 race run over 1 year
- Best finish: 13th (1936)
- First race: 1936 Vanderbilt Cup (Westbury)
Wins	Podiums	Poles
0	0	0

24 Hours of Le Mans career
- Years: 1937
- Teams: Murray
- Best finish: DNF (1937)
- Class wins: 0
- Cricket career

Cricket information
- Batting: Left-handed
- Bowling: Left-arm fast

Domestic team information
- Years: Team
- 1929: Cambridge University

Career statistics
Competition	First-class
Matches	2
Runs scored	21
Batting average	10.50
100s/50s	–/–
Top score	12
Balls bowled	387
Wickets	6
Bowling average	38.83
5 wickets in innings	–
10 wickets in match	–
Best bowling	4/86
Catches/stumpings	2/–

Patrick Greenway Fairfield (26 November 1907 – 21 June 1937) was a British racing driver and cricketer.

== Early life and cricket ==
Fairfield was born at Liverpool in November 1907. When his parents divorced, and his mother remarried, he moved to South Africa at the age of 15, where his family owned a citrus farm at White River. During his period in South Africa he was often known as Patrick Greenway Webster (using the surname of his stepfather).

After completing his education at St. Andrew's College, Fairfield's family believed he needed to gain a suitable degree to manage the farm, and so he applied to the University of Cambridge; average exam results at the time meant his application was unsuccessful. He left for England, where he attended a cram school in Eastbourne to prepare him for the Cambridge entry exams and was successful in entering Cambridge on the second attempt.

While studying at Cambridge, Fairfield made two appearances in first-class cricket for Cambridge University in 1929 at Fenner's, playing against Nottinghamshire and the touring South Africans. Fairfield scored 21 runs in his two matches and took 6 wickets, with best figures of 4 for 86.

== Racing career ==
Fairfield met his future wife Jean Beckett at Cambridge and the completion of his studies, the couple returned to South Africa where they settled at White River and began farming. He changed his surname to Fairfield at some point after his return to South Africa. Developing an interest in motor racing, with the help of his mother he financed a move back to England in 1933 to pursue a career as a racing driver.

In England, Fairfield joined with Cyril Paul, another young and inexperienced racing driver, with the two working under Freddie Dixon in his Middlesbrough and Brooklands. During Fairfield's first year he drove a Riley Special, finishing 13th in the Ards TT of 1934. In 1935 he purchased an 1100cc white ERA from Raymond Mays, the first such sale to a private buyer. This bought him some success when he won the 1935 Mannin Beg, despite the failure of the car to start at the beginning of the race. He also won the Nuffield Trophy at Donington Park and the voiturette race at the Circuit Dieppe-St Aubin.

In 1936, Fairfield traveled to the U.S. to compete in the American Automobile Association-sanctioned Vanderbilt Cup. He finished fifth driving an ERA. He failed to win a race in 1936, but did finish third at the South African Grand Prix during his winter return to South Africa. He went one better in January 1937 and won the South African Grand Prix, then being staged at the Prince George Circuit. Having impressed Raymond Mays, he was invited to join the ERA works team for 1937. Fairfield won that years Coronation Trophy at Crystal Palace circuit.

After his victory at Crystal Palace, Fairfield traveled to France to take part in the 24 Hours of Le Mans, where he drove a Frazer Nash–BMW 328 with David Murray. Eight laps into the race the aging Bugatti T44 of René Kippeurth crashed and overturned on the fast corner leading to the pit straight, with Fairfield unable to avoid hitting the stricken Bugatti before being shunted himself from behind by the Delage of the Frenchman Jean Trémoulet. Kippeurth was killed instantly in the accident, with Fairfield seriously injured and taken to hospital in Le Mans, where he succumbed to his injuries two days later while being operated on.

== Memory ==
The Pat Fairfield Trophy was run in Fairfield's honour in South Africa during 1966 and 1967.

== Motorsports career results ==
=== 24 Hours of Le Mans results ===
Year	Team	Co-Drivers	Car	Class	Laps	Pos.	Class Pos.
1937	(United Kingdom) David Murray	(United Kingdom) David Murray	BMW 328	2.0	8	DNF	DNF
