= Pierre Veyron =

French racing driver (1903–1970)

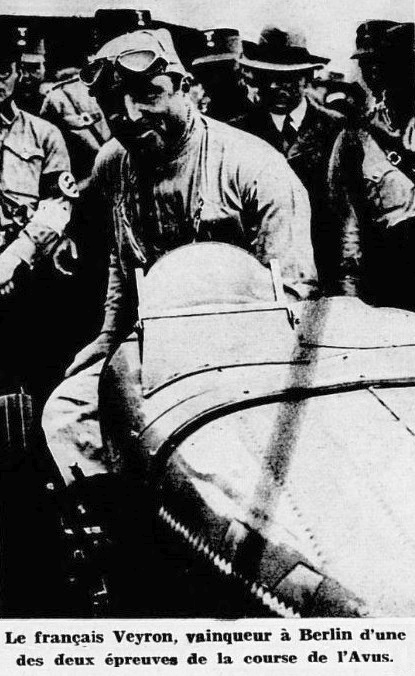
- Pierre Veyron in 1934.
- Nationality: (France) French
- Born: 1 October 1903 Berc, France
- Died: 2 November 1970 (aged 67) Èze, France
- Occupation: Grand Prix motor racing driver
- Years active: 1930–1953
- Known for: Winner, 24 Hours of Le Mans (1939)
- Awards: Legion of Honour (1945)

Pierre Veyron (1 October 1903 – 2 November 1970) was a French Grand Prix motor racing driver active from 1933 through 1953.

== Career ==
Veyron enrolled at university to study engineering. Veyron's friend, Albert Divo, convinced Veyron to take up racing and introduced Veyron to André Vagniez, an industrialist who provided financial support to Veyron. Vagniez purchased a Bugatti Type 37A that Veyron drove to his first racing victory, winning the 1930 Geneva Grand Prix.

Jean Bugatti, son of Bugatti founder Ettore Bugatti, hired Veyron in 1932 as a test driver and development engineer. Veyron entered races as a Bugatti company driver, winning many including the 1933 and 1934 Berlin Avus races while driving a Bugatti Type 51A. Veyron's most significant race victory was his 1939 win at the 24 Hours of Le Mans, co-driving a Bugatti Type 57S Tank with Jean-Pierre Wimille.

During World War II, Veyron joined the French Resistance against German occupation. For his service during the war, the Republic of France awarded him the Legion of Honour in 1945.

After the war, Veyron continued racing, but his main focus was on his family and his oil-drilling technology company. Veyron died in Èze, France in 1970.

Bugatti Automobiles S.A.S. named the Veyron 16.4 supercar in honor of Veyron.

== Racing record ==
=== Complete 24 Hours of Le Mans results ===
Year	Team	Co-Drivers	Car	Class	Laps	Pos.	Class Pos.
1934	(France) Roger Labric (private entrant)	(France) Roger Labric	Bugatti Type 50S	5.0	73	DNF	
1935	(France) Roger Labric (private entrant)	(France) Roger Labric	Bugatti Type 50S	5.0	116	DNF	
1937	(France) Roger Labric (private entrant)	(France) Roger Labric	Bugatti Type 57G Tank	5.0	130	DNF	
1939	(France) Jean-Pierre Wimille (private entrant)	(France) Jean-Pierre Wimille	Bugatti Type 57C Tank	8.0	249	1st	1st
1949	(France) Amédée Gordini (France) Automobiles Gordini	(France) José Scaron	Simca-Gordini T8	S1.1	88	DNF (Transmission)	
1950	(France) Manufactures d'Armes de Paris	(France) Fernand Lacour	M.A.P. Diesel	S5.0	39	DNF (Overheating)	
1951	(France) Equipe Gordini	(France) Georges Monneret	Gordini T15S	S1.5	130	DNF (Engine)	
1952	(United Kingdom) Donald Healey Motor Co.	(France) Yves Giraud-Cabantous	Nash-Healey	S5.0	?	DNF (Engine)	
1953	(United Kingdom) Nash-Healey Inc.	(France) Yves Giraud-Cabantous	Nash-Healey Sports	S5.0	9	DNF (Engine)	

Sporting positions
Preceded by Eugène Chaboud; Jean Trémoulet	Winner of the 24 Hours of Le Mans; 1939 with: Jean-Pierre Wimille	Succeeded by Luigi Chinetti; Peter Mitchell-Thomson
