= 1937 24 Hours of Le Mans =

14th 24 Hours of Le Mans endurance race

Previous: 1936	Next: 1938
Index: Races | Winners

The 1937 24 Hours of Le Mans was the 14th Grand Prix of Endurance. It took place at the Circuit de la Sarthe on 19 and 20 June 1937. The race was won by Jean-Pierre Wimille and Robert Benoist in Roger Labric's works-supported Bugatti team, in one of the streamlined new Type 57G cars, at a record pace and exceeding 2000 miles in the race for the first time.

The race was also notable for one of the most serious accidents in the race's history. An hour into the race, French driver René Kippeurt lost control of his Bugatti tourer at the notorious Maison Blanche corner. His car slammed into the roadside bank and rolled, throwing the driver onto the circuit. Coming around the blind corner, cars took desperate evasive actions to avoid the wreck and the unconscious driver. Ten other cars were involved, including the Frazer Nash of Pat Fairfield which rammed the stationary Bugatti and was then hit itself. Kippeurt died at the scene and five others were taken to hospital with Fairfield dying the next day from his injuries. For the first time, the race was stopped to allow the wreckage to be cleared.

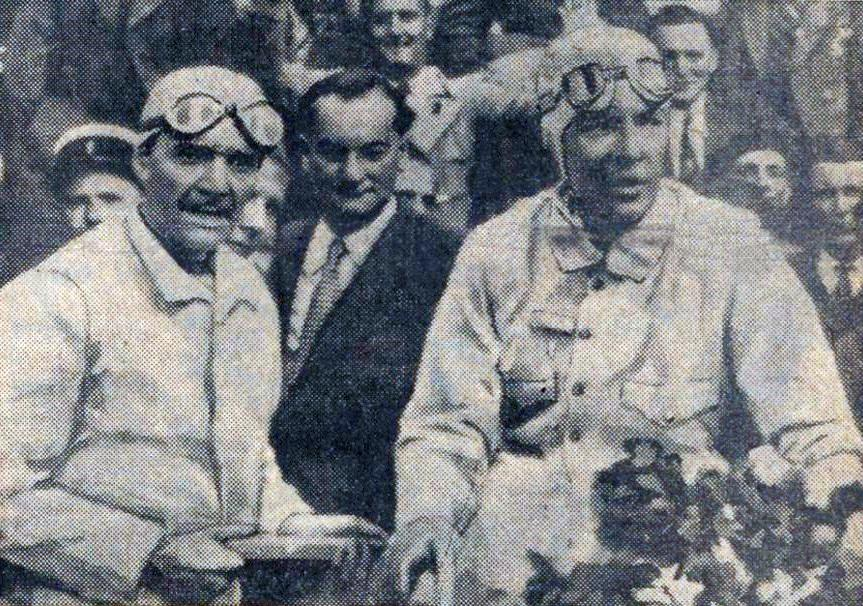
Robert Benoist (left) and Jean-Pierre Wimille (right), winners of the 1937 24-Hours

With Sommer out after over-revving his gearbox avoiding the accident, it left a clear path for the French cars. After three hours, Wimille had a 2-lap lead. A short, sharp squall briefly slowed everyone down, but Wimille and Benoist were able to cruise to an easy outright victory by a margin of 100 km, that also gave them the Index of Performance prize. French cars took the top four places, with the 1.5-class winning Aston Martin in fifth and German 2-litre Adler in sixth.

== Regulations and organisation ==
In 1936, the dominance of the German Mercedes-Benz and Auto Union teams in Grand Prix racing and eclipse of French racing had led the Automobile Club de France (ACF) to draft new sports-car regulations for their Grand Prix.

These had sparked a resurgence in the French automotive industry and the Automobile Club de l'Ouest (ACO) chose to align their race regulations closely in accordance with the ACF. All cars now had to be only two-seaters (doors optional). Manufacturers had to sign a declaration that at least 30 cars were made, sold or currently in the process of being built.

As the ACF regulations were for an unsupercharged engine, of a maximum of 4-litres, to further limit the impact of supercharging the ACO lifted the engine-equivalence ratio from x1.4 up to x1.6. Extra distance was also added onto the larger engines, while the 3-and 4-litre classes were eased slightly for the reliability of the new French engines. The ACO did line up with the international AIACR class delineations, now with eight eligible classes, named "A" to "H". At the bottom end, the bracket was moved up from 1000 to 1100cc and the smallest class was 500-750cc.

This year the fuel supplier alternated to Esso, with four choices: its regular petrol, 100% benzole, a ternary blend of the regular with benzole and ethanol. However, the usual 4th choice (a petrol/benzole blend) was replaced by the option of 100% gasoline. For the circuit, further spectator fencing was installed at the Esses and Indianapolis-Arnage corners.

The year also saw the AIACR formalise the flag-codes to be used by circuit marshals. Various combinations were already being used sporadically but this system has remained in use, unchanged ever since. These included a red flag to stop all cars, a yellow warning of imminent danger, a blue flag alerting to a faster car approaching from behind and a black and white chequered to signify the end of the race. Waving flags indicated greater urgency. These were all used at Le Mans for the first time, with equivalent coloured lights available around the circuit to assist the marshals during the hours of darkness.

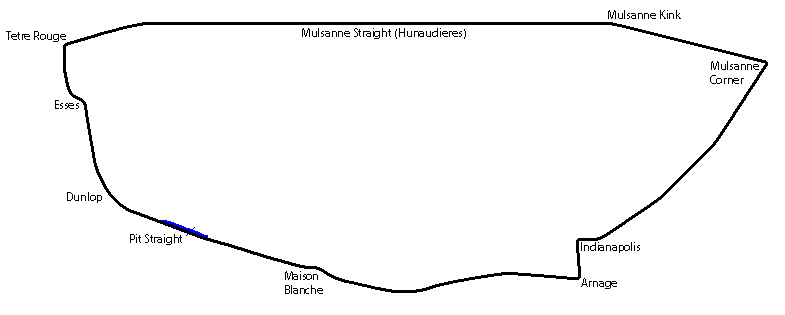
Le Mans in 1937

Engine size	1935 Minimum distance	1937 Minimum distance	Average speed	Equivalent laps
6000cc+	2,619 km (1,627 mi)	2,679 km (1,665 mi)	111.6 km/h (69.3 mph)	198.6 laps
5000cc	2,600 km (1,600 mi)	2,601 km (1,616 mi)	108.4 km/h (67.4 mph)	192.8 laps
4000cc	2,569 km (1,596 mi)	2,552 km (1,586 mi)	106.3 km/h (66.1 mph)	189.2 laps
3000cc	2,509 km (1,559 mi)	2,474 km (1,537 mi)	103.1 km/h (64.1 mph)	183.4 laps
2000cc	2,350 km (1,460 mi)	2,331 km (1,448 mi)	97.1 km/h (60.3 mph)	172.8 laps
1500cc	2,225 km (1,383 mi)	2,203 km (1,369 mi)	91.8 km/h (57.0 mph)	163.3 laps
1100cc	2,017 km (1,253 mi)	2,041 km (1,268 mi)	85.0 km/h (52.8 mph)	151.3 laps
750cc	1,743 km (1,083 mi)	1,808 km (1,123 mi)	75.3 km/h (46.8 mph)	134.0 laps

== Entries ==
The change in French racing regulations had promised a strong field for the cancelled race the year before. A year later, this finally came to fruition with a competitive entry list for this race. After a year of further testing, French manufacturers were in force for outright victory – with Delahaye, Bugatti, Talbot-Lago and Delage all present, thus vindicating the ACF's decision. In a unique confluence, both Le Mans and the blue riband French Grand Prix would be run to the same regulations this year and mindful of the pre-eminent race of the season following only a fortnight later, both Delahaye and Bugatti kept their latest racing models under wraps. Their competition had wilted – the British Lagonda, winner in 1935 now looked decidedly outmatched just two years later. Alfa Romeo had dominated the race for four years before that with their supercharged 8C. However, after the Scuderia Ferrari withdrew a 3-car entry, there was only a single entry left, from two-time winner Raymond Sommer. In the smaller classes, there was the debut for two German teams, Adler and BMW. Often recently the preserve of small British sports cars, the list was notable for the number of small French cars, led by a squadron of Simca-Fiats, resembling an entry-list more akin to the first years of the race in the 1920s. The further penalising on supercharged engines meant there were only two such cars in the field this year, well down on the dozen or more typically seen in the earlier years of this decade.

Given the cancellation of the race in 1936, the Coupe Bienniale was instead drawn from the finishers of the previous 1935 race which still provided twelve entries returning for honours.

Category	Entries	Classes
Large-sized engines	16 / 14	over 3-litre
Medium-sized engines	16 / 13	1.5 to 3-litre
Small-sized engines	24 / 22	up to 1.5-litre
Total entrants	57 / 49	

- Note: The first number is the total entries, the second the number who started. Using the equivalent engine-size, with supercharged engines having the new x1.6 conversion factor

=== Over 2-litre entries ===
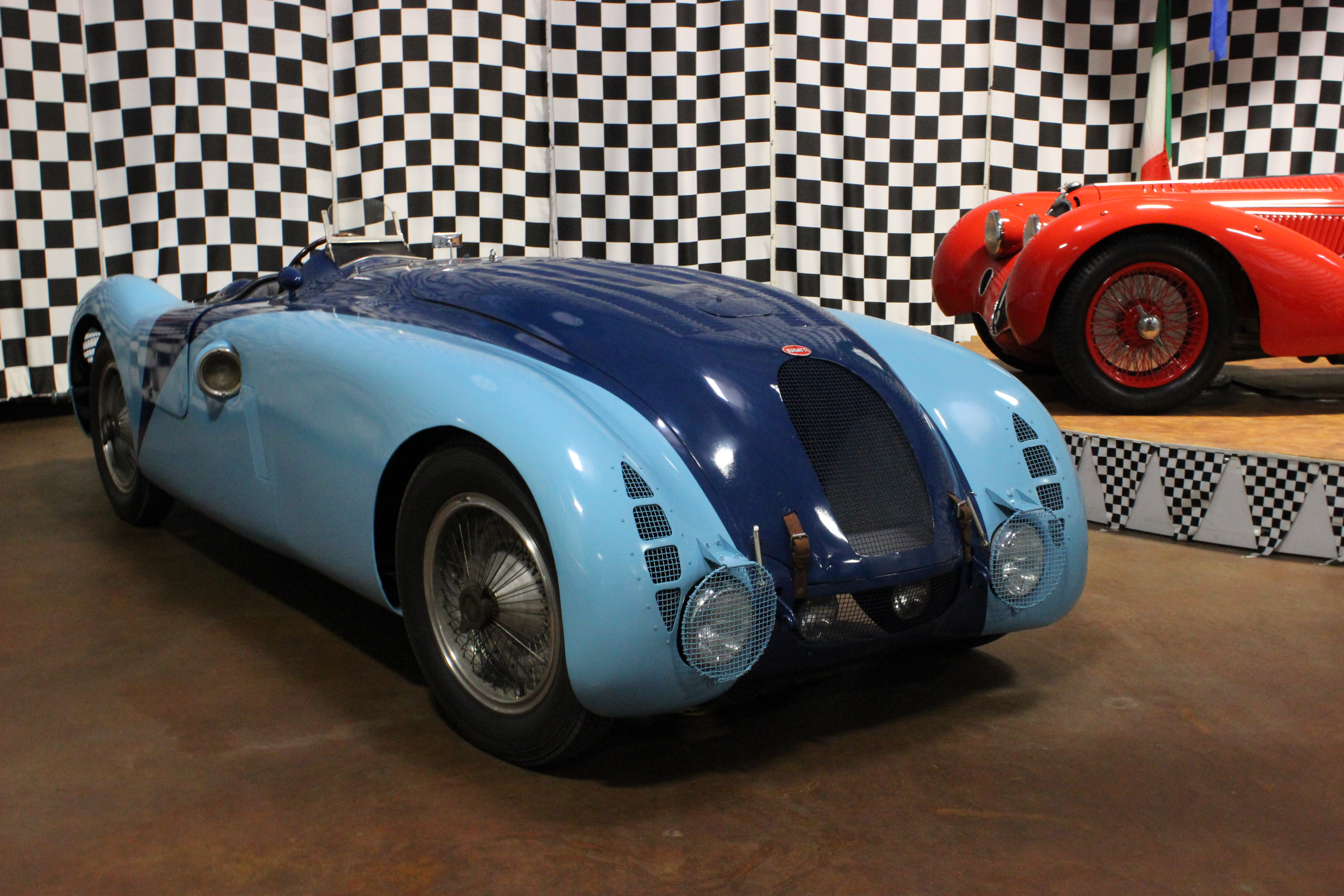
Bugatti Type 57G

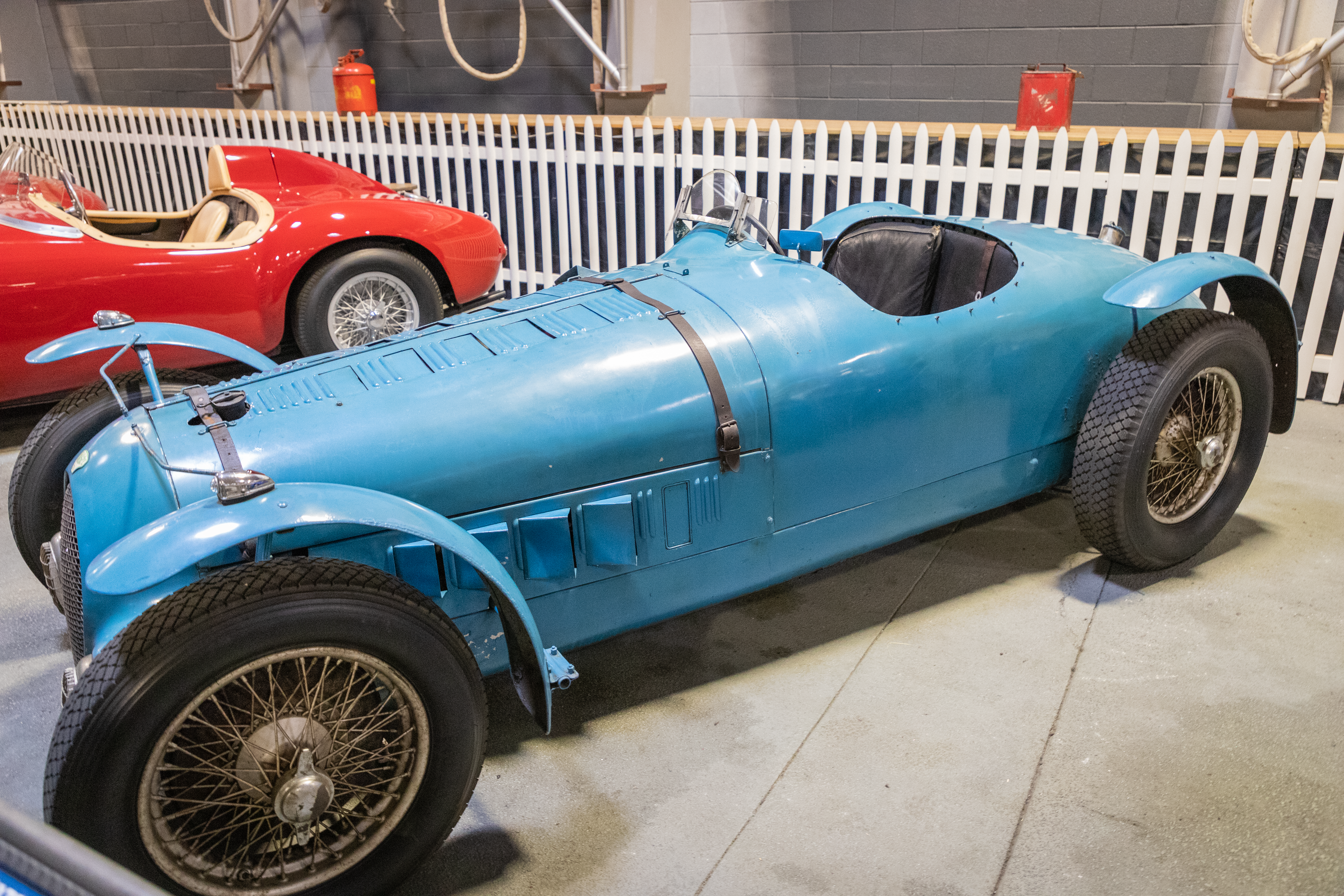
Delahaye 135 CS

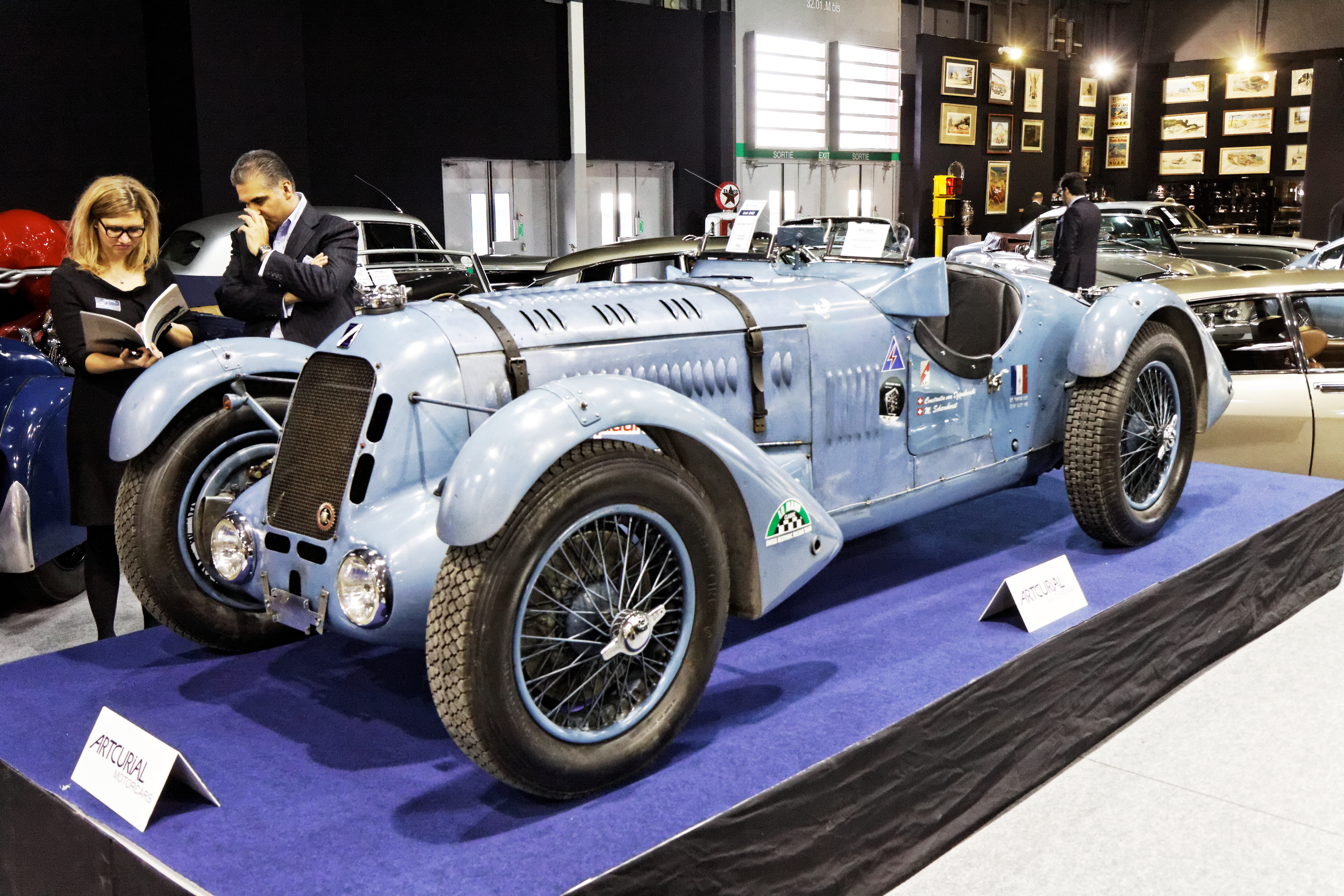
Talbot T150C

Automobiles Bugatti had struggled in Grand Prix racing, with their Type 59 proving unsuccessful. Under the new ACF regulations work had started on the new car soon after the 1936 race was cancelled. The Type 57 Grand Prix (later shortened to 57G) was developed from the Type 57S luxury tourer. The 3266cc racing engine put out 170 bhp with the main chassis members drilled out with holes to reduce weight. On the long back straight, it could reach almost 220 kp/h (135 mph). With a 130-litre fuel tank, over it all was a full-width streamlined magnesium-alloy body encompassing the wheels and giving it the nickname "tank". It was also fitted with hydraulic brakes and a 4-speed synchromesh gearbox. It also had an extra headlight mounted on the right-hand side, ahead of the driver's door, to help spot the apex of the right-hand turns – particularly those of Tertre Rouge, Mulsanne and Arnage. In the hands of Grand Prix driver Jean-Pierre Wimille and Raymond Sommer, it had proven successful in 1936, including winning the French Grand Prix. Meanwhile, Technical Director Jean Bugatti was also working on a 4.5-litre version and originally two of these Type 57S45 cars had been entered. However, time ran out to have them ready and so Bugatti stalwart Roger Labric entered two of the three Type 57Gs on behalf of Bugatti. For Wimille, the new French racing superstar, it was his first Le Mans and he was joined by Robert Benoist, a former works driver and current Competition Director, while voiturette driver Pierre Veyron raced with Labric himself, in the second car. There were two other privateer models entered – a new Type 57 Sports for Frenchman Raymond d'Estrez Saugé, which he had fitted with a larger rear fuel-tank for the 3.3-litre car. René Kippeurt also returned with his 3-litre Type 44. Sometimes racing under the pseudonym "Rekip", this year he had modified the bodywork of his tourer.

Delahaye had been convinced to come back to racing with the help of the wealthy American couple of Laury and Lucy Schell, resident in France. The ACF rules had produced the Type 135, and their money saw the development of the updated 135 CS, with a 170 bhp 3.6-litre Straight-6, and fitted with a semi-automatic gearbox. The Schells purchased four cars and encouraged a number of their French racing friends to buy cars as well – many of whom then fitted personalised aluminium bodyshells. Like Bugatti, a new model was being prepared. The Type 145 had a 4.5-litre V12, but not being fully ready it was the 135 CS cars that were entered. Although not as fast as the Bugatti or Talbot, they did have a proven reliability. Seven were entered for Le Mans. The Schell's Écurie Bleue had two cars with factory support. Laury Schell was partnered by René Carrière (a pair who had recently finished third in the Mille Miglia), and Grand Prix racer René Dreyfus raced with the experienced Henri Stoffel, who had finished second in 1931 and 1935. Parisian cinema-owner Joseph Paul and Eugène Chaboud had already had success in local French races, while former boxer Louis Villeneuve, Robert Brunet and Paul Bénazet were regular gentleman-racers.

The Alfa Romeo 8C had been the car to beat in the 1930s races, yet this year there was only a single entry. Ferrari had provisionally entered three cars, but when Alfa Romeo bought out an 80% share of the Scuderia early in the year, their Chairman Ugo Gobbato chose to withdraw their cars. So, the only Alfa presence was entered by Raymond Sommer. The Alfa Romeo 8C-2900 had been specifically designed for the Mille Miglia, the premier Italian sports-car race. The shorter wheelbase and supercharged 3-litre engine were well-suited to the long straights and tight town-corners in Sicily. Scuderia Ferrari had won there in 1936 and 1937, along with the Spa 24 Hours. The twin-supercharged 8-cylinder engine put out 220 bhp. A brand new car, painted black, was built at Portello for Sommer and driven straight to Le Mans by his prospective co-driver Giovanni Battista Guidotti, the Alfa engineer who had supervised the cars preparation. They would be supported by Meo Costantini as pit manager, who was sporting director at Alfa Romeo and former Bugatti team manager.

Delage had been very successful in Grand Prix racing in the 1920s, duelling with Bugatti. However, the company had gone into receivership after the Great Depression, to be purchased by British expat Walter Watney. He arranged a deal with Delahaye to have Delage cars built at their factory with Delahaye parts. Meanwhile Louis Delâge, still kept on as a director, developed the D6 coupé. The elegant D6-70 was a new version with a special 3-litre engine. Producing 130 bhp, it was capable of getting the car up to 160 kp/h (100 mph). A 1936 entry was filed by the works team, but this year a car was entered by the Société R.V. – a company co-owned by Parisian Delage agent Jacques de Valence de Minardière, who was also its lead driver. This car had recently been bought by slot-machine magnate Louis Gérard, who had never raced before, but would be the co-driver.

Unable to convince the ACF to run a 3-litre class in their regulations, new Talbot owner Anthony Lago was forced to adapt the T120 raced here in 1935. The new 4-litre dry-sump engine put out 165 bhp, and was very fast. Called the 'T150 Course', the chassis was shortened and fitted with independent front suspension and a Wilson pre-selector gearbox. Extensive testing was done in 1936 at Montlhéry by André Morel (ex-Amilcar works driver) and René Dreyfus (ex-Scuderia Ferrari) along with Le Mans winner Luigi Chinetti. But reliability was an issue and results were poor. In 1937 Dreyfus left for Delahaye. In return, Lago was able to entice Albert Divo and young star René le Bègue to join from Delahaye, along with Raymond Sommer. Over the break, the cars were lightened and given an extra 25 bhp. Four were entered for Le Mans. However, with the French Grand Prix only a fortnight later, Lago withdrew the two works cars to have them prepared for that race and Sommer had a release clause in his contract to drive his Alfa Romeo at Le Mans. Two privately owned cars would race – one with Chinetti, joined by off-contract Grand Prix driver Louis Chiron, and the other with young Greek ERA-driver Nicky Embiricos and Raphaël de Montbressieux (racing under the pseudonym "Raph").

The biggest car in the field was the 4.5-litre Lagonda, entered by Arthur Fox's team, continuing with the long-time works support. Rescued from bankruptcy the previous year, Lagonda had engineer W. O. Bentley (formerly owner of his own company with a strong Le Mans pedigree) working up a new V12-engined car. Meanwhile, the LG45 kept the same 130 bhp engine as the race-winning M45 Rapide, upgrading it with new suspension and a new gearbox, all of which could now get it up to 200 kp/h (125 mph). Team regular, and 1935-race winner, Johnny Hindmarsh was teamed up this year with Charles Brackenbury.

=== 1.1- to 2-litre entries ===
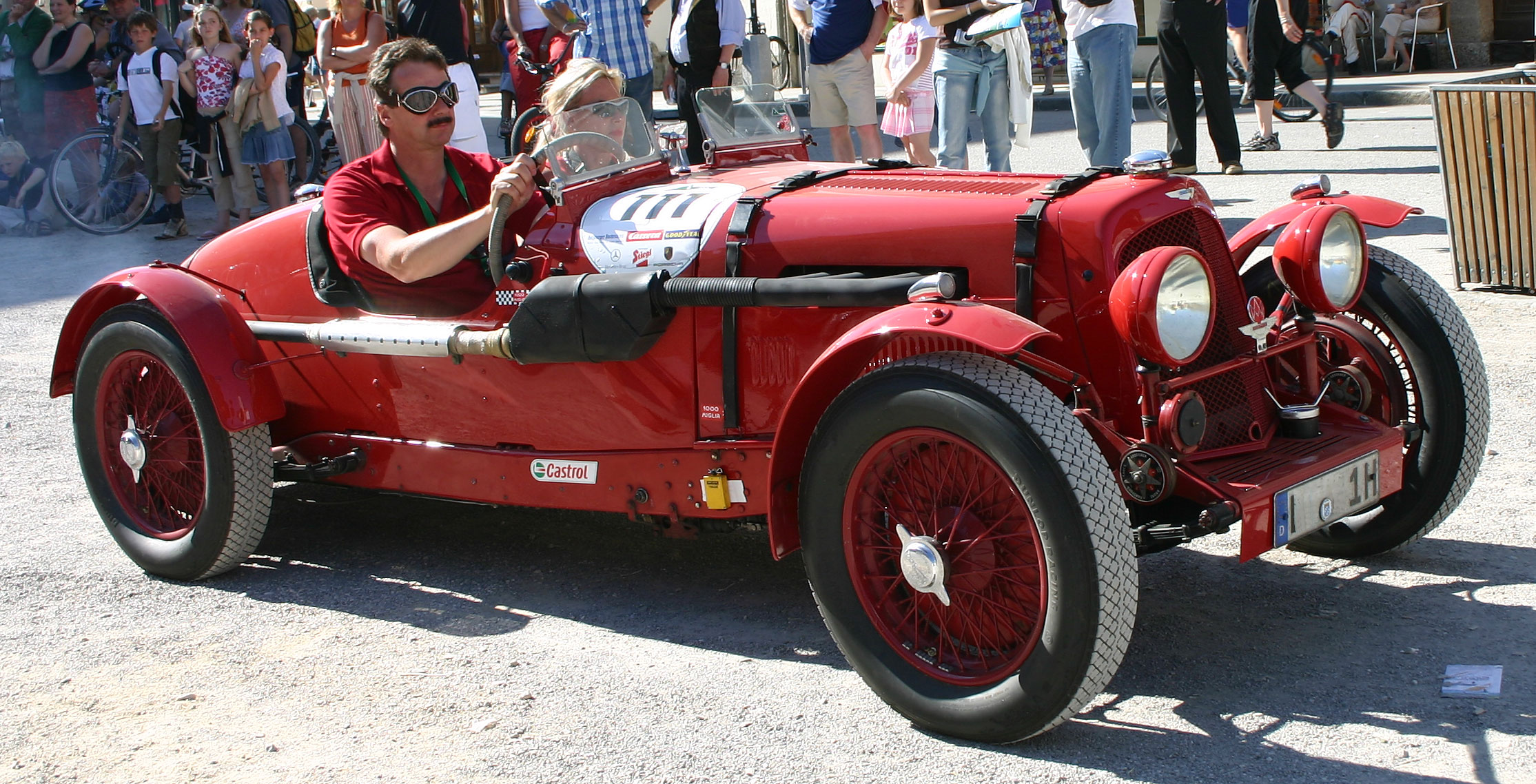
Aston Martin Speed Model

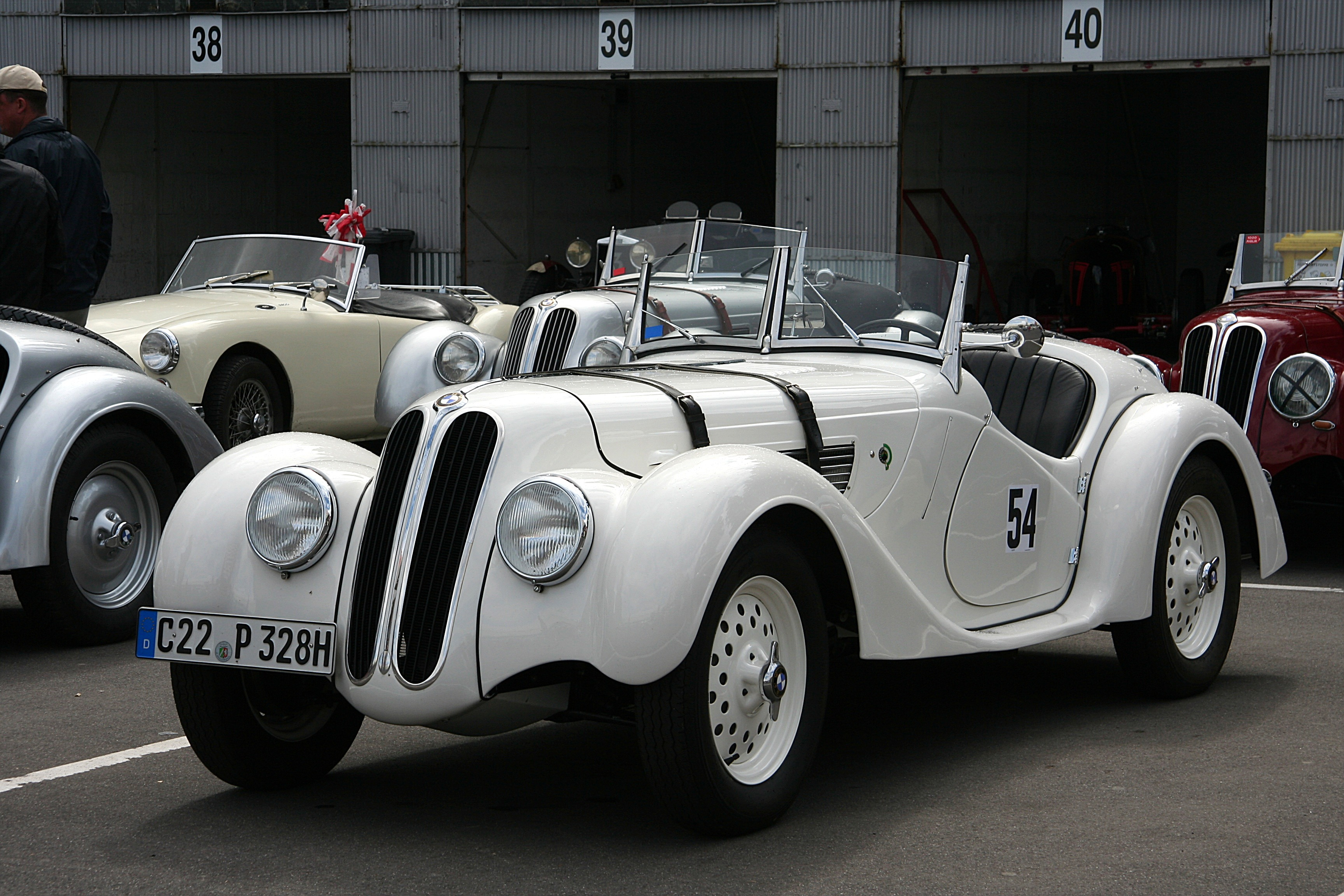
BMW 328

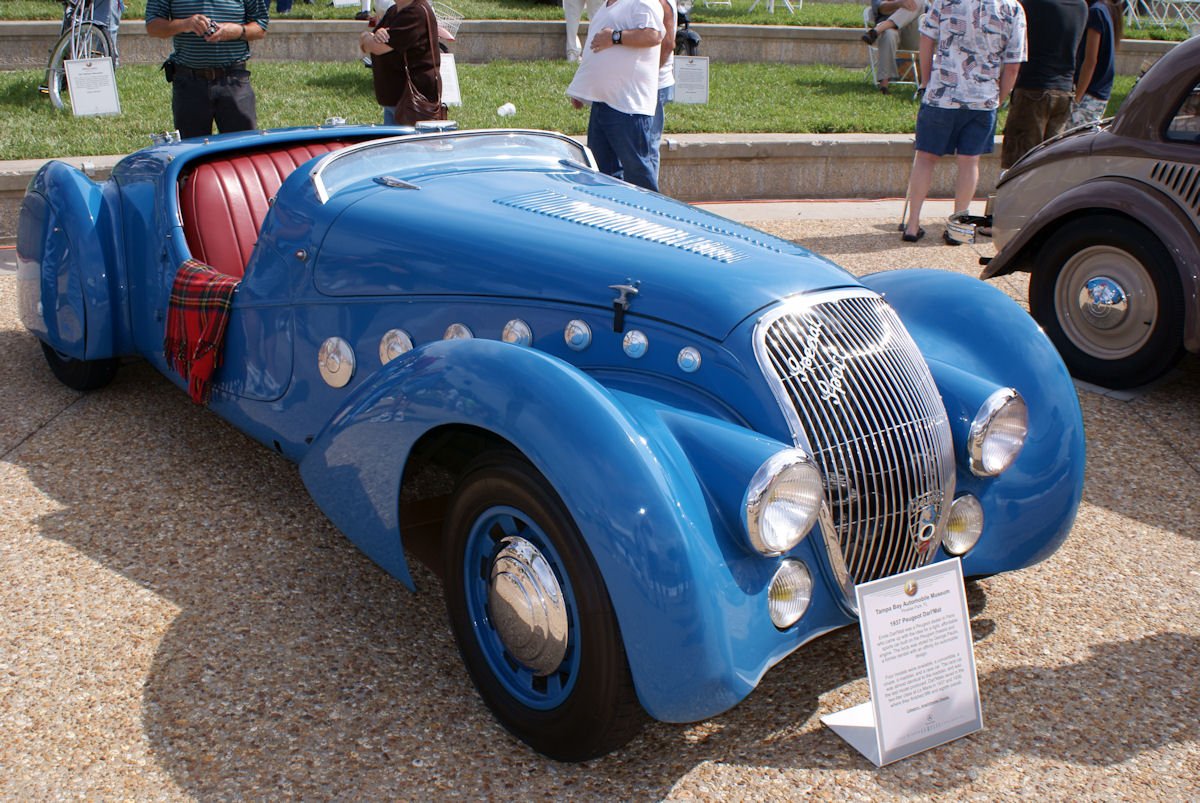
Peugeot 302 Darl’Mat special

Just as much as the larger-engine classes, the 2-litre class promised competition with a field of new entries. British roadsters had dominated the mid-sized classes in the past few years. Aston Martin had achieved an excellent third outright in the 1935 race, although of late, Riley had taken over their pre-eminence. Aston Martin was the expensive, elite brand and now looked to move into the under-represented 2-litre market. Orchestrator of that success, Technical Director "Bert" Bertelli, had left the company in February. The new Speed Model had either a 1949cc engine or a dry-sump 1971cc version. When the works team was folded after the cancelled 1936 race, the two cars were on-sold several times to end up with Robert Hichens and Dutchman Eddie Hertzberger and both arrived at Le Mans. The 1.5-litre car that had finished third two years previously also returned to the track, now owned and entered by John Skiffington, Viscount Massereene.

Like Aston Martin, Riley had also closed down its works team, as economic realities were forced on the company. Bought out by Morris Motors, no British entries arrived. However, there were two French entries from the new Écurie Eudel of Guy Lapchin and Jean Eudel (owner of the Riley dealership in Paris). Taking two ex-works cars, they commissioned Georges Paulin to design a new metal bodyshell with streamlined wheel-fairings (being the same designer and coachbuilder as Peugeot and Darl'mat were using). Lapchin rode with Jean Trévoux, who had an entry for the Biannual Cup. Raoul Forestier, another Écurie Eudel investor, drove the other car.

In August 1934, "Aldy" Aldington, director of Frazer Nash, signed an agreement with BMW to license-manufacture the German cars in Britain. Soon after, the new BMW 328 model was introduced. Designed by former Horch engineer Fritz Fiedler, the car featured swing-axle front suspension, a live rear axle and hydraulic dampers. The 2-litre 6-cylinder engine produced 80 bhp and could get the roadster up to 150 kp/h (95 mph). Full production started in February 1937 along with racing successes. For Le Mans, three cars were entered: one full works entry, driven by Uli Richter and Fritz Roth (replacing Ernst Henne injured at the recent Eifelrennen race). The other two were badged as Frazer Nashes, with Aldington joined by his fellow AFN-director A.F.P Fane, while up-and-coming ERA works driver Pat Fairfield was brought in to join AFN-investor David Murray. They were all improved versions of the standard car, with a spare wheel mounted on the rear, 118-litre, fuel tank and were now capable of reaching 185 kp/h (115 mph). The British cars ran on Dunlops while the German car ran on tyres from local Munich company Metzeler.

Adler had been a Frankfurt mechanical company since starting in 1880, building bicycles. By the start of the war, they had 20% of the German car market. The Depression hit the company hard, having to lay off 70% of their workforce. The Trumpf model, introduced in 1932, was the start of their revival of fortunes. The 'Super' version had a bigger 1.7-litre version of the side-valve engine, that put out 38 bhp. The "Rennlimousine" variant caused a sensation when it was unveiled in 1936. Based on a Swiss concept car from the 1920s, it featured a fully enclosed, longtail aluminium bodyshell. It was designed by Adler engineer Reinhard von König-Fachsenfeld, one of the innovators in vehicle aerodynamics. The curved windscreen and sloping cockpit blended into the pointed tail. The wheels were included under the shell and the hubs had hubcaps over the spokes. Endurance records were set at the AVUS track and the race-engines were tuned up to 55 bhp. Three cars came to Le Mans: the lead car of Graf Orssich and Rudolph Sauerwein had won their class at the previous year's Spa 24-hours. The second car was run by their other team-drivers Paul von Guilleaume and Otto Löhr. The third car had a standard 1.5-litre engine and was loaned to French driver Anne-Cécile Rose-Itier, who held an entry to the Biennial Cup. She was joined by her new beau Huschke von Hanstein. Finally, there was a French privateer entry of a 996cc Trumpf Junior roadster in the crowded 1.1-litre class.

Peugeot had been a force in French motorsport ten years previously. When the new Peugeot 302 tourer was released, it was Émile Darl'mat, owner of the largest Parisian Peugeot dealership, which saw its potential as a sports roadster. He got permission from the company to build his own Darl'mat Spéciales. Fitted with an aerodynamic aluminium body, they would have the larger 70 bhp 2-litre engine of the Peugeot 402 sister-model. With works-team support, three cars were entered. Works driver Louis Rigal had driven for Peugeot the only time they had competed at Le Mans, in 1926, and was paired with Daniel Porthault who had latterly driven a Lorraine-Dietrich of the same vintage. Peugeot's own competition manager Charles de Cortanze drove the second car with works driver Maurice Serre, while another works driver Jean Pujol raced with Maurice Contet.

The other new-entrant manufacturer was HRG. Only formed in 1936 by Ronald Godfrey and his partners, they had built a half-dozen cars with a staff of 10. An aluminium body was fitted over an ash-wood frame. It was fitted with a 1.5-litre Meadows overhead-valve engine and 4-speed gearbox. One of the first people to purchase a model was Archie Scott. He brought the car to Le Mans, with HRG principal Ted Halford (the "H" of HRG) as his co-driver.

=== Up to 1.1-litre entries ===
Singer returned to defend their class-victory from 1935. In the interim, the works team had been closed down but the team manager, Stan Barnes, set up his own team with his brother Donald. Team Autosports brought three cars to the race, with works backing. Stan Barnes and Roy Eccles had entries in the Biannual Cup after driving for Aston Martin in the 1935 race. Donald would drive one car, joined by Norman Black (a former Singer works driver), while Eccles had his wife Marjorie as co-driver. A fourth car was put in by French privateer, Jacques Savoye, who put his own bodyshell on the chassis.

Earlier in the decade, MG cars had fared very well at Le Mans. This year, there was only a single entry. At the previous race, in 1935, speed-record champion George Eyston had three all-female crews to run the Midget PA. This year he provided support to Dorothy Stanley-Turner, the 20-year-old owner of a Midget PB. The newer model was now 937cc and developed 43 bhp. She had been taught to drive by Joan Chetwynd and then started racing at Easter. It was only after the race that she revealed that she was driving with a broken rib after a recent fall. Her co-driver, Enid Riddell, was an interesting choice – she would be imprisoned in London during the war as a Nazi sympathiser.

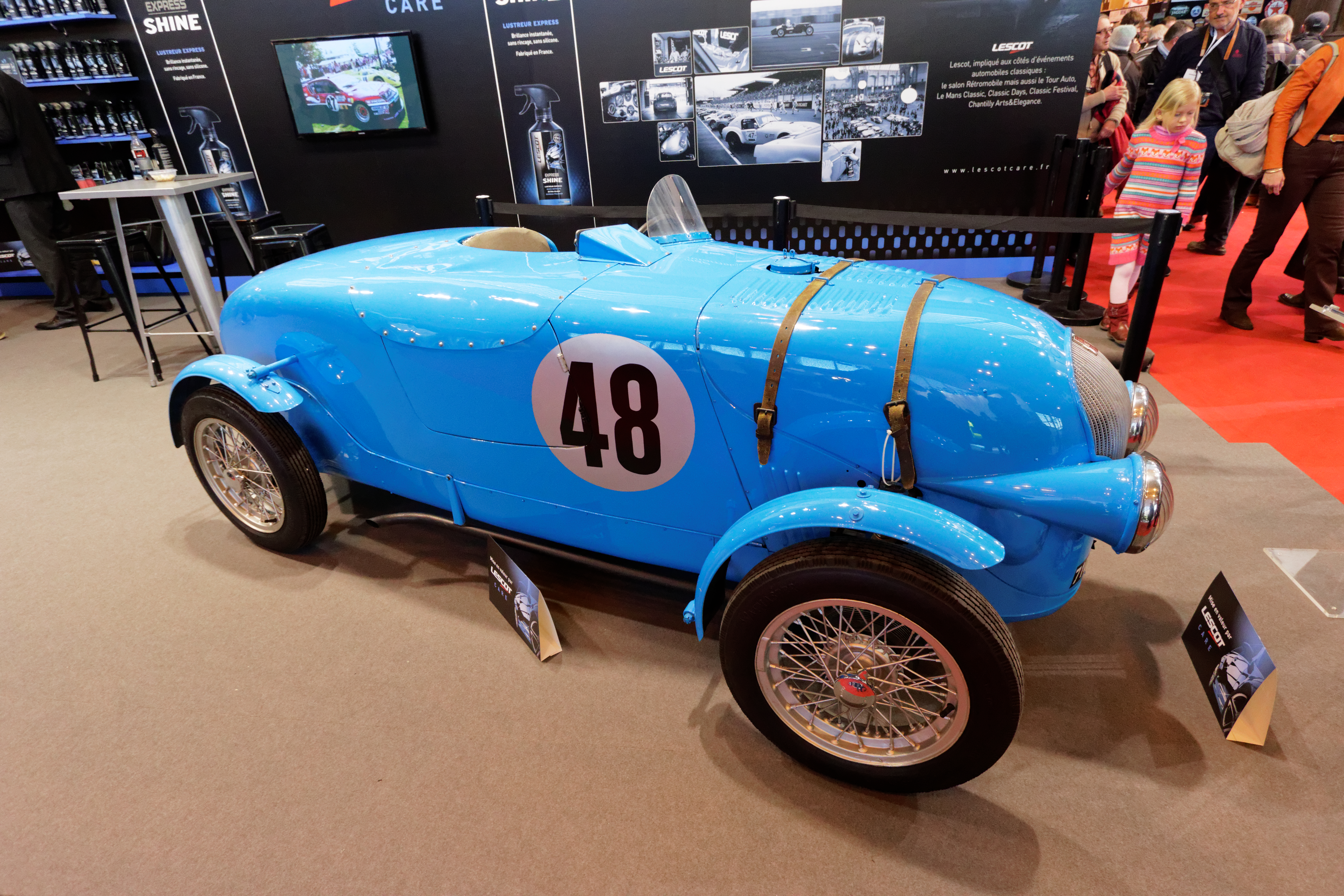
Simca-Fiat Cinq Gordini

With ample technical support from Fiat, the new SIMCA daughter-company had achieved rapid success on the circuits in 1936, with Amédée Gordini running, effectively, a works team. Gordini convinced Henri Pigozzi, SIMCA general manager, to support the design of a special racing version of the Simca-Fiat 6CV. It was built with a one-piece aluminium body on a wooden frame, with improved suspension and gearbox, and hydraulic brakes. The 996 cc engine was tuned and modified to now generate 55 bhp. Alongside this project, SIMCA had started licence-production of the Fiat 500 "Topolino", known as the Simca Cinq or 5CV. Gordini also prepared racing versions of that model, with another specially fashioned bodyshell. Its little high-compression 569cc side-valve engine put out just 20 bhp. They would be the smallest-engined cars ever to compete at Le Mans. Gordini brought five cars to Le Mans, with three Sixes and a pair of Cinqs. He drove a Six himself, with team regular Philippe Maillard-Brune, while his other driver, Jean Viale, ran a Cinq. The Alin brothers, who had driven a BNC twice before, were brought in as co-pilots. Just-Émile Vernet entered his privateer SIMCA Six, with Suzanne Largeot as his co-driver.

An entry came from Yves Giraud-Cabantous with the pair of venerable Chenard-Walcker Z1s. He had run his own Caban cars here in 1931 and 1932 with the aid of Roger Labric. The Chenard-Walckers had last raced here in 1925, helping secure the Biennial Cup and the first (and only) Trienniale Cup for the manufacturer. At the time, these small, streamlined cars had been innovative, inspired by the Bugatti Type 32. After Chenard-Walcker stopped motor-racing in 1926, the cars had been parked up in a warehouse until Giraud-Cabantous offered to buy them. The 1095cc pushrod engine put out 50 bhp and Giraud-Cabantous installed a supercharger on his, that put the car now up in the 2-litre class. They subsequently won the Bol d'Or 24 hour race. This feat was accomplished by French wrestler Charles Rigoulot in his very first motor-race. He joined the team-owner in one car, with Roux/Cotet in the other.

The Austin EK75 "Speedy" was the sports-version of the Austin 7. Fitted with a new racing engine, the latest "Grasshopper" variant could now reach 125 kp/h (80 mph). A one-piece bodyshell, removing the doors on the roadster, saved further weight. Again, taking advantage of prior results, all three cars were able to be entered for the Biannual Cup. An unusual entry was a Ford Model CX entered by Australian Joan Richmond and her fiancé Maurice "Bill" Bilney. The CX was a deluxe tourer version of the Ford Model C Ten production car, with a 30 bhp engine. Assisted by former Aston Martin engineer and driver Jack Besant, they upgraded the car to racing standard for the 1936 race. A year later they entered it again.

== Practice and pre-race ==
Benoist had already taken the first Bugatti to Le Mans for testing, but the second car was not completed until race week. The race team were already in Le Mans when Veyron left the factory in the car at 8am on the Tuesday covering the 700 kilometres in less than 8 hours to arrive just in time for scrutineering. Delage driver Louis Gérard, to his credit, having never raced before put in the most laps of anyone to learn the circuit and his new car. The little HRG team had a problematic week – the car was damaged in a minor car accident en route to Le Mans. A plane had to be chartered to fly in a new suspension unit.

The Bugatti team practiced their pit-stop routine on Friday night, and were able to change four tyres, replenish fuel, water and oil in just over 100 seconds – far quicker than other teams. They had also found a very impressive fuel economy of less than 20 litres/100km (better than 14mpg) that gave it a range of about 500 km. Roy Eccles was supposed to be racing a Singer with his wife. However, after celebrating too hard on the night before the race, he was unable to take the start. His place would be taken by Freddie Clifford. Donald Barnes also had to rush back to London for the early birth of his child, so his place in the Singer was taken by his brother, and team co-owner, Stan Barnes.

== Race ==
=== Start ===
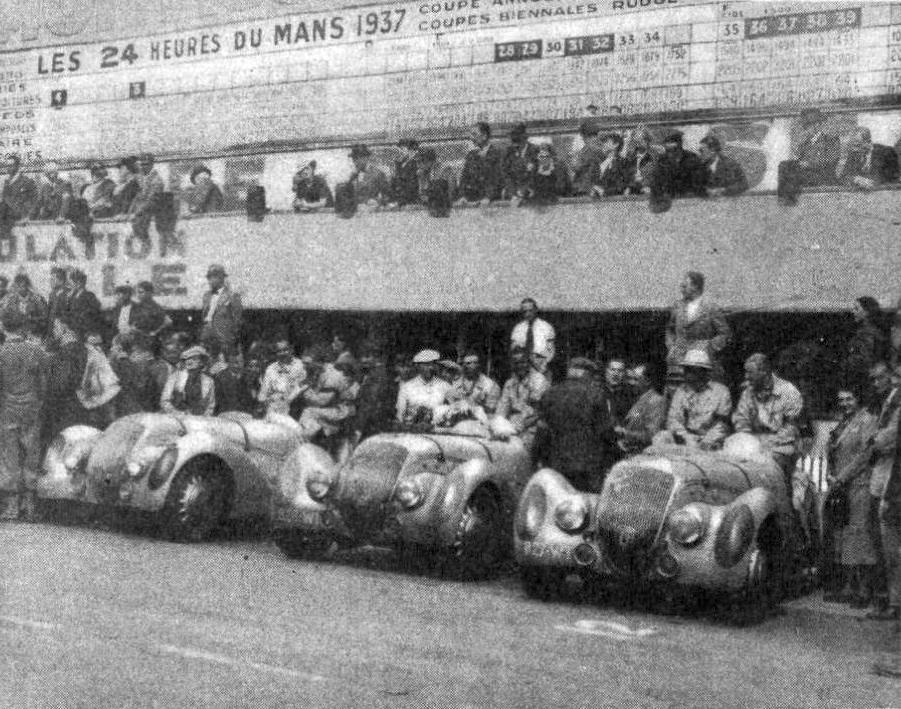
Peugeot-Darl'Mat team lined up for the start

The honorary starter this year was John Cobb, British driver and all-time record holder at Brooklands. Although the big Lagonda was first under the bridge, it was "Raph" in his Talbot, who got to the front going down the Hunaudières Straight for the first time. Then Raymond Sommer got into the lead on the run down to Indianapolis. Wimille was ninth at the end of the first lap, letting the engine warm up, just ahead of the Lagonda. Then on the third lap, Wimille broke Sommer's 4-year-old track record and Veyron let him by to take third. On successive laps he passed Brunet, then Sommer, to take the lead. Only five laps in, Chiron had to pit the Talbot to change sparkplugs, costing him three laps.

==== Maison Blanche accident ====
It was at the end of the first hour that the accident occurred. The Maison Blanche corners, leading up to the pit-straight, already had a notorious reputation with serious multi-car accidents in the 1927 and 1932 races. Running a lap down, René Kippeurt lost control of his Bugatti coming through the left-right combination at 130 kp/h (80 mph). Hitting the bank hard and mowing down a length of fencing, the car got airborne throwing the driver out onto the circuit before rolling several times down the road. Next to arrive were the two BMWs of Roth and Fairfield. Instinctively Roth swerved right, sending him over a ditch, through a hedge and rolling his car. Unsighted, Fairfield went the other way but slammed into the Bugatti head-on. The impact was so hard, it dislodged the engine off the Bugatti's chassis. Next to arrive was Trémoulet in his Delahaye, but he could do nothing but hit the stationary Frazer Nash-BMW and go flying through the air and ending up in a field. The Talbot of "Raph" hit the Delahaye and ricocheted into a roadside tree. The chain reaction continued when the Riley of Forestier, in turn, rear-ended the Talbot and ending up through a hedge. Morris-Goodall, in his Aston-Martin, skidded on spilt oil and side-swiped the Bugatti while Chiron, running again, was able to slide to a stop and squeeze his Talbot through the carnage. However, running over debris, a sliver slashed a water hose and he lost his coolant forcing his retirement as well.

Meanwhile, Forestier had got out and, joined by a marshal waving a red flag, was running down the track to warn the rest of the rapidly approaching field, including the leaders. Wimille braked hard and picked his way through, but Sommer also had to avoid people running onto the track to pull Kippeurt's motionless body off the racing line. Desperately trying to slow up, with engine-breaking engine-braking he missed a gear and over-revved the engine, and his race was effectively over. On the following lap, it expired at the Mulsanne corner. The remainder of the field came to a halt, with the race brought to an official stop for the first time. The toll on the drivers was severe – Kippeurt died at the scene and five more were taken to hospital. Three were discharged with cuts and bruises, but "Raph" had two broken legs, while Fairfield underwent emergency surgery. His injuries were too serious though, and he died on Sunday evening. After only ten minutes the wrecks and debris were pulled off to the side of the road to allow the field to get through. As of 2026, this was the last time the red flag was waved during the 24 Hours of Le Mans.

==== Race goes on ====
By being one of the last cars to get through, Wimille could steal a march on the field and came round to the back of the queue with almost a full lap's lead. By 7pm, it had grown to a 2-lap lead. The team-car of Veyron/Labric was second, pursued by the leading Delahaye, of Schell/Carrière.

With the failure of the Alfa Romeo and Lagonda, it left the race for overall victory clear for the French teams. As the cars made their first fuel stops, the Delahayes came in one after the other. Stoffel tripped getting into the car he shared with Dreyfus and somehow broke the door-hinges. Forty minutes were lost getting the door repaired and dropping them well down the order to 30th. Brunet, running fifth, handed his car over to novice driver Parguel who soon planted it in the sandbank at Mulsanne on his first lap. Somehow a shovel appeared, and he was able to get back to the pits. Now down in 35th, a furious Brunet promptly took over and proceeded to drive solo through the night. The frugal fuel economy of the two Bugattis meant it was nearly 7.30pm before they pulled in for their first pit-stops and driver-changes – Veyron did 33 laps, while Wimille did a remarkable 38 laps. Another team with excellent fuel economy were the Adlers. Huschke von Hanstein had come in after 38 laps and refuelled but forgot to top up the engine oil. When he came back in two laps later to do it, it technically violated the 24-lap margin between fluid replenishments and got disqualified. His co-driver, Anne-Cécile Rose-Itier, was furious at his rookie mistake.

The good weather that served most of the race was interrupted by a heavy thunderstorm at 8pm that lasted half an hour and virtually flooded the pitlane. As cars eased back in the rough weather, the Delahaye of Schell moved up to second. The only casualty was the unsupercharged Chenard-Walcker that skidded off the track at the Mulsanne corner, and planted itself in the sandbank.

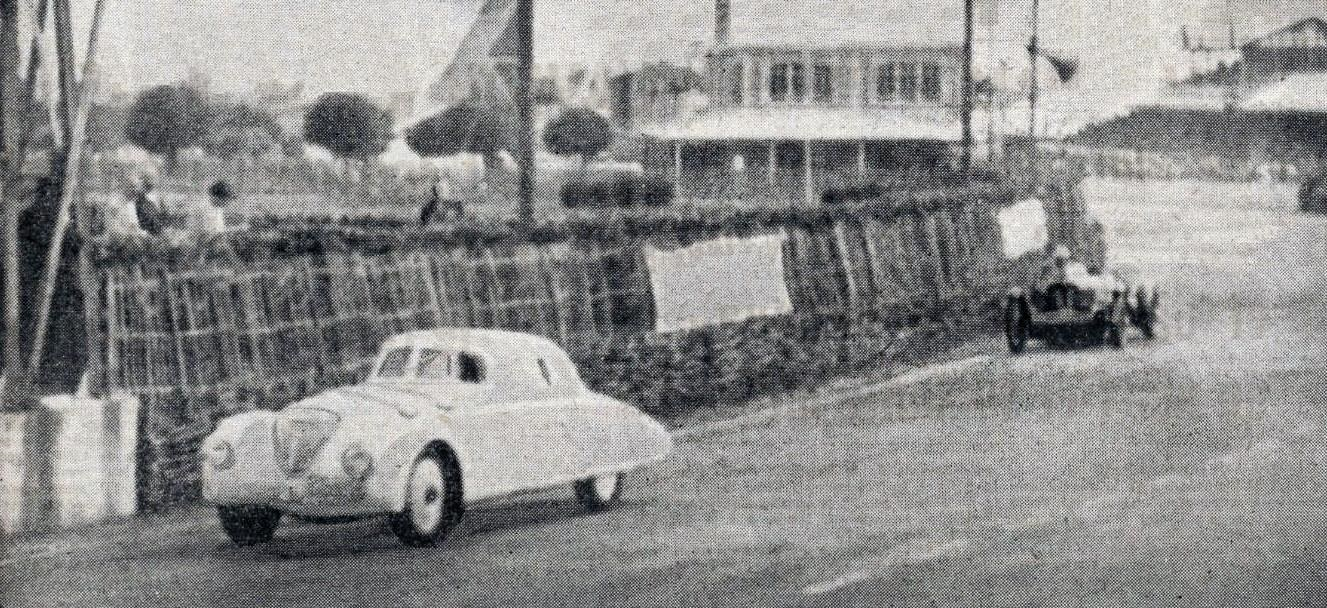
Adler (#33) leads Schell's Delahaye (#11) through the first corner

=== Night ===
The storm passed and the night stayed dry. Wimille and Benoist continued circulating at a regular speed, without incident. Meanwhile in the 2-litre battle, the remaining Frazer Nash-BMW of Aldington/Fane was leading and running sixth overall. Then Fane stopped on the Hunaudières Straight with ignition problems. He was able to get back to the pits but, working in the pouring rain, the two drivers could not get it restarted. The class lead was taken up by the Aston Martins of Morris-Goodall (having repaired its accident damage) and Eddie Hertzberger. The Dutchman was having a good race, and by midnight was running 7th overall. They were being chased keenly by the Adler and Peugeot teams for class honours. Along with the Maison Blanche accident, attrition was high and by nightfall fully half the field had retired.

By midnight Wimille and Benoist had extended their lead to three laps. Schell and Carrière consolidated their second place while the Paul/Mongin Delahaye tussled with the Labric/Veyron Bugatti over third place. Dreyfus drove hard through the night, charging back up the field and, pulling back four laps on this group in the process, was back inside the top-10. In the Biennial Cup at the halfway stage, it was the all-female MG leading from the Eccles/Clifford Singer, the Morris-Goodall Aston and Savoye's Singer, with Villeneuve's Delahaye the fifth on handicap.

During the night all three Austins were put out by the same problem: engine vibrations bent the copper oil-pipes severely. When they inevitably cracked and broke, the oil soon leaked out and the engines quickly seized. Soon after dawn the Bugatti of Labric and Veyron was put out with a split fuel-tank. The car had been losing time through the night with either clutch or fuel-supply issues. Meanwhile, the sister car now had a 7-lap lead. After the early problems, Robert Brunet had driven through the night all the way up to tenth. He finally handed over to his inexperienced co-driver. All the hard work was undone when it was retired soon after with a broken gearbox. In contrast, by 5am Dreyfus' incredible drive had got him back up to third, with the Delage sedately cruising behind in fourth.

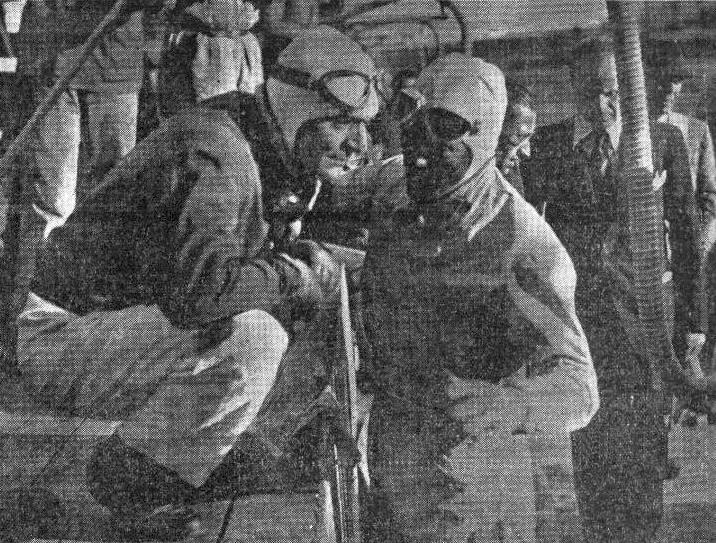
Benoist (left) and Wimille (right) at a pit-stop for the Bugatti

=== Morning ===
With the retirements through the night, the crowd was excited that the Delahaye of Villeneuve/Vagniez was second in the Biennial Cup and closing in on the Hichens/Morris-Goodall Aston Martin. But their hopes literally went up in smoke just after 8am, when the engine caught fire in a refuelling stop. Although it was put out, the electrics were too fried to continue. After running second for 17 hours, the Schell Delahaye began overheating in the mid-morning. After several pit-stops, it was found a nut securing the water-pump had come loose, eventually rupturing a hose. Leaking water and unable to make the next refuelling stop to fill up, the car was retired around 10am. Dreyfus' speed allowed him to catch and pass Paul to move up to second, but by lunchtime they had virtually completely worn out their brakes and dropped behind again.

Hertzberger's Aston Martin had set the pace through the night in the medium-engine classes, but then soon after 8am, they were stopped by a split oil-line. The leading cars of the Adler (Sauerwein/Orssich) and Peugeot (Contet/Pujol) teams were now vying for the class-honours, swapping the lead several times through the morning. Just before midday, the remaining Singer of Marjorie Eccles stopped out on the track while leading the Coupe competition. Eccles walked back to the pit with a broken magneto. When she returned to the car with a spare she was prevented from doing repairs by an official, as the part had not been in the car, per the standard regulations.

By noon, Benoist had a comfortable 11-lap lead. However, in a lapse of concentration, he overshot his braking at Arnage trying to lap another car. Beached in the roadside ditch, it was pushed back onto the road by keen spectators. Potentially a disqualifiable offence, the stewards were persuaded that it was warranted as the big car was in a dangerous position to other drivers. The damage was not serious, and they were able to continue now easing back on their pace.

=== Finish and post-race ===
With the attrition of the field, there were now only two cars left in the race for the Biennial Cup. The women in the MG had been well in the contest in the first half of the race. However, they encountered clutch problems in the morning, but once those were resolved things had been running reliably. The Aston Martin had a sizeable margin over that smaller MG, until it came sputtering to a stop around 3pm. Morris-Goodall managed to limp back to the pits where they parked the car. The MG could not overhaul the 8 laps needed to exceed the Aston's Index ratio but would still win if the Aston did not finish. With ten minutes remaining, "Mort" gingerly took the car out for its final lap. He made it round to win the Biennial Cup. The MG also finished, in 16th, getting 10 laps further than their target distance. A curious incident occurred during one of their fuel-stops when the filler-cap would not seal properly. The young Stanley-Turner wanted to use an orange stuffed into the fuel-pipe to stop leakage. When an official objected that only items carried on the car could be used for repairs, she charmed him to accept that she always kept a bag of oranges in the car in case she got thirsty while racing.

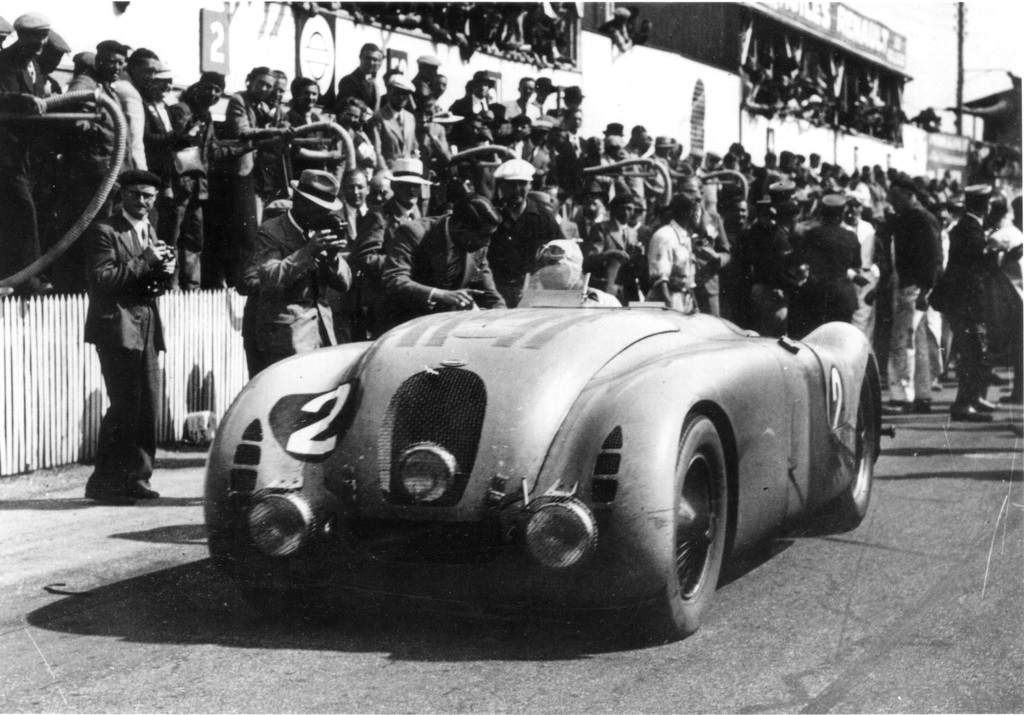
Wimille brings the winning Bugatti across the line

With the leaders relaxing, the pursuing Delahayes were able to claw back two laps of the deficit. At 3pm Benoist pitted to hand over to Wimille to take the final shift to the chequered flag. The public address announced that the leaders had already exceeded the previous race-distance record, set in 1933, to generous applause from the crowd. Wimille continued on without incident to take a dominant victory, having not relinquished first place since the first hour. Mongin and Paul finished 7 laps (100 km) in arrears, with Dreyfus a further five laps behind them. The Delage coupé cruised home to fourth, trouble-free aside from windscreen wipers unable to cope with the sudden storm early in the race.

A commendable fifth place (albeit over 500 km behind the winners) was the privateer Aston Martin Ulster. It had run without incident, steadily moving up the field through the second day. The car ran ten laps fewer than it did in 1935, but was still good enough to head home all the 2-litre cars and easily winning its 1.5-litre class by 42 laps over the HRG. That car had been delayed by a broken oil-pipe in the morning and had crept around carefully in the last hour doing just enough to make its target distance. In the end, that 2-litre class was won by the leading Adler pair of Sauerwein/Orssich, with the team sandwiching a pair of the Darl'Mat Peugeots, with just 3 laps between the four of them.

Amédée Gordini had been controlling the 1.1-litre class for virtually the whole race. But when a mistake in the pit-signalling from his crew called him in for refuelling two laps too early at lunchtime, the car was disqualified. It capped off a bad race for the 5-car works team with just a single car finishing with all the rest waylaid by mechanical issues. That car was the little SIMCA Cinq of Viale/Alin which was the only finisher in the 750cc class. Although nearly 100 laps behind the winners, they still beat their Index target by 25 laps. It fell to Vernet's privateer SIMCA to win the 1.1-litre class after the demise of the Singer. The near-standard Ford CX also lasted the distance, coming second-in-class. Tragically however, Richmond's fiancé Bilney would be killed five weeks later at the Donington 12-hour race.

For France, it was their first victory since 1926, vindicating the ACF's decision to change their racing formula. The winners comfortably broke the distance record set by Sommer and Nuvolari in their Alfa Romeo in 1933 and exceeded 2000 miles for the first time. The professionalism of the Bugatti team presaged a coming time of major works efforts to win this increasingly prestigious race. Bugatti also won the Index of Performance. Wimille set a new lap record and joined a small group of driver to win the race on debut, including Tazio Nuvolari and Woolf Barnato. For Benoist, it was a suitable highlight to retire on after a prominent racing career in the 1920s. It should have been a celebratory renaissance of French racing, with half the field made up of French cars again. However, the two deaths cast a grim shadow over Bugatti's achievement. They were the first race fatalities at Le Mans since 1925. Naturally, it raised concerns among commentators as to the inexperience and liability of some of the “gentleman-drivers” "Raph" needed several months to recover from his broken legs and spent his time recuperating at Wimille's house on the Côte d'Azur. The effect on his co-driver, Embiricos, after his own serious accident the week before was sufficient to convince him to give up a promising racing career.

The French Grand Prix was held a fortnight later, to the same regulations. Bugatti had one of their new Type 57S45 cars, but the handling was terrible and it never raced. With Bugatti out, it was a victory to Louis Chiron, leading home a 1-2-3 for Talbot.

== Official results ==
=== Finishers ===
Results taken from Quentin Spurring's book, officially licensed by the ACO Class Winners are in Bold text.

Pos	Class	No.	Team	Drivers	Chassis	Engine	Tyre	Target distance*	Laps
1	**5.0**	**2**	**(France) Roger Labric**	**(France) Jean-Pierre Wimille** **(France) Robert Benoist**	Bugatti Type 57G	Bugatti 3.3L S8	**D**	186	243
2	5.0	14	(France) J. Paul (private entrant)	(France) Joseph Paul (France) Marcel Mongin	Delahaye 135 CS	Delahaye 3.6L S6	**D**	188	236
3	5.0	10	(France) Écurie Bleue	(France) René Dreyfus (France) Henri Stoffel	Delahaye 135 CS	Delahaye 3.6L S6	**D**	188	231
4	**3.0**	**19**	**(France) Société R.V.**	**(France) Jacques de Valence de Minardière** **(France) Louis Gérard**	Delage D6-70	Delage 3.0L S6	**D**	184	215
5	**1.5**	**37**	**(United Kingdom) J.M. Skeffington** (private entrant)	**(United Kingdom) Hon. John Skeffington**; **Viscount Massereene** **(United Kingdom) Robert Murton-Neale**	Aston Martin 1½ Ulster	Aston Martin 1494cc S4	**D**	163	205
6	**2.0**	**33**	**(Germany) Adlerwerke**	**(Germany) Petar, Graf Orssich** **(Germany) Rudolph Sauerwein**	Adler Trumpf Super Rennlimousine	Adler 1679cc S4	**E**	167	205
7	2.0	26	(France) Émile Darl'mat	(France) Jean Pujol (France) Marcel Contet	Peugeot 302 Darl'mat Spéciale Sport	Peugeot 1996cc S4	**D**	172	203
8	2.0	25	(France) Émile Darl'mat	(France) Charles de Cortanze (France) Maurice Serre	Peugeot 302 Darl'mat Spéciale Sport	Peugeot 1996cc S4	**D**	172	203
9	2.0	34	(Germany) Adlerwerke	(Germany) Otto Löhr (Germany) Paul von Guilleaume	Adler Trumpf Super Rennlimousine	Adler 1679cc S4	**E**	167	202
10	2.0	27	(France) Émile Darl'mat	(France) "Danniel" Daniel Porthault (France) Louis Rigal	Peugeot 302 Darl'mat Spéciale Sport	Peugeot 1996cc S4	**D**	172	197
11	2.0	31	(United Kingdom) C.T. Thomas (private entrant)	(United Kingdom) Robert Hichens (United Kingdom) Mortimer Morris-Goodall	Aston Martin Speed Model	Aston Martin 1949cc S4	**D**	171 [B]	193
12	**1.1**	**48**	**(France) J.-É. Vernet** (private entrant)	**(France) Just-Émile Vernet** **(France) Suzanne Largeot**	Simca 6 Gordini	Fiat 996cc S4	**D**	147	171
13	1.5	36	(United Kingdom) A.C. Scott (private entrant)	(United Kingdom) Archie Scott (United Kingdom) Ted Halford	HRG Le Mans	Meadows 1496cc S4	**D**	163	163
14	1.1	42	(United Kingdom) M.K.H. Bilney (private entrant)	(United Kingdom) Bill Bilney (Australia) Joan Richmond	Ford Ten Model CX Special	Ford 1099cc S4	**D**	151	161
15	1.1	49	(France) H. Lesbros (private entrant)	(France) Henri Lesbros (France) Dimitri Calaraséano	Adler Trumpf Junior	Adler 996cc S4	?	147	160
16	1.1	54	(United Kingdom) Capt. G.E.T. Eyston	(United Kingdom) Dorothy Stanley-Turner (United Kingdom) Enid Riddell	MG Midget PB	MG 936cc S4	**D**	144 [B]	154
17	**750**	**59**	**(France) Amédée Gordini**	**(France) Jean Viale** **(France) Albert Alin**	Simca 5 Gordini	Fiat 568cc S4	**D**	120	145

=== Did not finish ===
Pos	Class	No	Team	Drivers	Chassis	Engine	Tyre	Target distance*	Laps	Reason
DNF	5.0	11	(France) Écurie Bleue	(France) Laury Schell (France) René Carriére	Delahaye 135 CS	Delahaye 3.6L S6	**D**	188	193	engine (18 hr)
DNF	1.1	41	(France) Yves Giraud-Cabantous	(France) Yves Giraud-Cabantous (France) Charles Rigoulot	Chenard-Walcker Z1	Chenard-Walcker 1095cc S4 supercharged	**D**	168	151	electrics (19 hr)
DNF	5.0	9	(France) L. Villeneuve (private entrant)	(France) Louis Villeneuve (France) André Vagniez	Delahaye 135 CS	Delahaye 3.6L S6	**D**	188 [B]	147	pit fire (17 hr)
DSQ	1.1	46	(France) Amédée Gordini	(France) Amédée Gordini (France) Philippe Maillard-Brune	Simca 6 Gordini	Fiat 996cc S4	**D**	147	137	premature refilling (21 hr)
DNF	2.0	32	(Netherlands) E. Hertzberger (private entrant)	(Netherlands) Eddie Hertzberger (France) Albert Debille	Aston Martin Speed Model	Aston Martin 1974cc S4	**D**	172	136	engine (18 hr)
DNF	5.0	1	(France) Roger Labric	(France) Roger Labric (France) Pierre Veyron	Bugatti Type 57G	Bugatti 3.3L S8	**D**	186	130	fuel tank (15 hr)
DNF	1.1	50	(United Kingdom) R.H Eccles (private entrant) (United Kingdom) Team Autosports	(United Kingdom) Marjorie Eccles (United Kingdom) Maj Frederick "Freddie" Clifford	Singer Nine Le Mans Replica	Singer 973cc S4	**D**	146 [B]	121	electrics (21 hr)
DNF	5.0	8	(France) A. Parguel (private entrant)	(France) André Parguel (France) Robert Brunet	Delahaye 135 CS	Delahaye 3.6L S6	**D**	188	100	gearbox (morning)
DNF	5.0	18	(France) R. d'Estrez Saugé (private entrant)	(France) Raymond d'Estrez Saugé (Spain) Genaro Léoz Abad	Bugatti Type 57S	Bugatti 3.3L S8	**D**	186	99	gearbox (11 hr)
DNF	1.1	53	(France) J. Savoye (private entrant)	(France) Jacques Savoye (France) Pierre Pichard	Singer Nine "Savoye Spéciale"	Singer 973cc S4	**D**	146 [B]	93	electrics (15 hr)
DNF	1.1	52	(United Kingdom) F.S Barnes (private entrant) (United Kingdom) Team Autosports	(United Kingdom) Geoff Boughton (United Kingdom) F.H. Lye	Singer Nine Le Mans Replica	Singer 973cc S4	**D**	146	91	engine (16 hr)
DNF	750	58	(France) Amédée Gordini	(France) Adrien Alin (France) Athos Querzola	Simca 5 Gordini	Fiat 568cc S4	**D**	120	77	fuel system (~12 hr)
DNF	750	57	(United Kingdom) Austin Motor Company	(United Kingdom) Charles Dodson (United Kingdom) Bert Hadley	Austin 7 EAK Grasshopper	Austin 748cc S4	**D**	133 [B]	74	engine (12 hr)
DNF	750	55	(United Kingdom) A.R. Marsh (private entrant); Austin Motor Company	(Canada) Kay Petre (Republic of Ireland) George Mangan	Austin 7 EAK Grasshopper	Austin 748cc S4	**D**	133 [B]	72	engine (12 hr)
DNF	1.1	51	(United Kingdom) F.S Barnes (private entrant) (United Kingdom) Team Autosports	(United Kingdom) F. Stanley Barnes (United Kingdom) Norman Black	Singer Nine Le Mans Replica	Singer 973cc S4	**D**	146	72	electrics (10 hr)
DNF	1.1	45	(France) Amédée Gordini	(France) Jacques Blot (France) Henri Ferrand	Simca 6 Gordini	Fiat 996cc S4	**D**	147	55	fuel system (~12 hr)
DNF	2.0	29	(United Kingdom) AFN Ltd	(United Kingdom) Harold Aldington (United Kingdom) Alfred "A.F.P" Fane	Frazer Nash-BMW 328	BMW 1971cc S6	**D**	172	43	engine (4 hr)
DSQ	1.5	35	(France) Mme A.-C. Rose-Itier (private entrant)	(France) Anne-Cécile Rose-Itier (Germany) Fritz Huschke von Hanstein	Adler Trumpf Rennlimousine	Adler 1495cc S4	**D**	163 [B]	40	premature refilling (evening)
DNF	5.0	15	(France) J. Seylair (private entrant)	(France) "Jacques Seylair" (Lucien Langlois) (France) Paul Bénazet	Delahaye 135 CS	Delahaye 3.6L S6	**D**	188	36	engine (evening)
DNF	750	56	(United Kingdom) J. Carr (private entrant)	(United Kingdom) Charles Goodacre (United Kingdom) Dennis Buckley	Austin 7 EAK Grasshopper	Austin 748cc S4	**D**	133 [B]	32	engine (dusk)
DNF	2.0	40	(France) Yves Giraud-Cabantous	(France) Charles Cotet (France) Charles Roux	Chenard-Walcker Z1	Chenard-Walcker 1095cc S4	**D**	151	32	accident (4 hr)
DNF	5.0	3	(United Kingdom) Arthur W. Fox	(United Kingdom) Johnny Hindmarsh (United Kingdom) Charles Brackenbury	Lagonda LG45	Meadows 4.5L S6	**D**	191 [B]	30	engine (~3 hr)
DNF	1.5	39	(France) Écurie Eudel	(France) Jean Trévoux (France) Guy Lapchin	Riley TT Sprite	Riley 1493cc. S4	**D**	163 [B]	11	engine (2 hr)
DNF	5.0	4	(France) R. Sommer (private entrant)	(France) Raymond Sommer (Italy) Giovanni Battista Guidotti	Alfa Romeo 8C 2900A	Alfa Romeo 2.9L S8 supercharged	**P**	191	11	engine (1 hr)
DNF	5.0	12	(France) E. Chaboud (private entrant)	(France) Eugène Chaboud (France) Jean Trémoulet	Delahaye 135 CS	Delahaye 3.6L S6	**D**	188	9	accident (1 hr)
DNF	5.0	7	(Greece) A. M. Embiricos (private entrant)	(Greece) Nicos Embiricos (France) "Raph" (Comte George Raphaël; Béthenod de Montbressieux)	Talbot T150C	Talbot 4.0L S6	**D**	190	9	accident (1 hr)
DNF	1.1	44	(France) Amédée Gordini	(Italy) Marino Zanardi (Italy) Angelo Molinari	Simca 6 Gordini	Fiat 996cc S4	**D**	147	9	transmission (2 hr)
DNF	1.5	38	(France) Écurie Eudel	(France) Raoul Forestier (Switzerland) Roger Caron	Riley TT Sprite	Riley 1493cc. S4	**D**	163 [B]	8	accident (1 hr)
DNF	2.0	30	(Germany) Bayerische; Motorenwerke AG	(Germany) Fritz Roth (Germany) Uli Richter	BMW 328	BMW 1971cc S6	Metzeler	172	8	accident (1 hr)
DNF	2.0	28	(United Kingdom) D. Murray (private entrant)	(United Kingdom) David Murray (United Kingdom) Pat Fairfield	Frazer Nash-BMW 328	BMW 1971cc S6	**D**	172	8	accident (1 hr)
DNF	3.0	20	(France) "M. Rekip" (private entrant)	(France) "M. Rekip" (René Kippeurt) (France) René Poulain	Bugatti Type 44	Bugatti 3.0L S8	**D**	184	8	fatal accident Kippeurt (1 hr)
DNF	5.0	21	(Italy) L. Chinetti (private entrant)	(Italy) Luigi Chinetti (Monaco) Louis Chiron	Talbot T150C	Talbot 4.0L S6	**D**	190	7	engine (1 hr)
Sources:

- Note *: [B]= car also entered in the 1935–37 Biennial Cup.
- Note **: equivalent class for supercharging, with x1.4 modifier to engine capacity.

=== Did not start ===
Pos	Class	No	Team	Drivers	Chassis	Engine	Reason
DNA	5.0	5	(France) Automobiles Talbot	(France) Albert Divo	Talbot T150C	Talbot 4.0L S6	Car not ready
DNA	5.0	6	(France) Automobiles Talbot	(Italy) Gianfranco Comotti	Talbot T150C	Talbot 4.0L S6	Car not ready
DNA	5.0	16	(France) Viscomte P. Merlin (private entrant)	(France) Viscomte Pierre Merlin	Delahaye 135 CS	Delahaye 3.6L S6	Did not arrive
DNA	3.0	22	(Italy) Scuderia Ferrari	(Italy) Carlo Pintacuda	Alfa Romeo 6C-2300 Pescara	Alfa Romeo 2.3L S6	Withdrawn
DNA	3.0	23	(Italy) Scuderia Ferrari	(Italy) Francesco Severi	Alfa Romeo 6C-2300 Pescara	Alfa Romeo 2.3L S6	Withdrawn
DNA	3.0	24	(Italy) Scuderia Ferrari	(Italy) Eugenio Siena	Alfa Romeo 6C-2300 Pescara	Alfa Romeo 2.3L S6	Withdrawn
DNA	1.1	43	(France) J. Breillet (private entrant)	(France) Jean Breillet	Rally ABC	Chapuis-Dornier 1093cc S4	Did not arrive
DNA	1.1	47	(France) Amédée Gordini		Simca 6 Gordini	Fiat 996cc S4	Did not arrive

=== 1937 index of performance ===
Pos	1935-37 Biennial Cup	Class	No.	Team	Drivers	Chassis	Index Result
1	-	5.0	2	(France) Roger Labric	(France) Jean-Pierre Wimille (France) Robert Benoist	Bugatti Type 57G	1.320
2	-	5.0	14	(France) J. Paul (private entrant)	(France) Joseph Paul (France) Marcel Mongin	Delahaye 135 CS	1.262
3	-	1.5	37	(United Kingdom) J.M. Skeffington (private entrant)	(United Kingdom) Hon. John Skeffington (United Kingdom) Robert Murton-Neale	Aston Martin 1½ Ulster	1.258
4	-	5.0	10	(France) Écurie Bleue	(France) René Dreyfus (France) Henri Stoffel	Delahaye 135 CS	1.235
5	-	2.0	33	(Germany) Adlerwerke	(Germany) Peter, Graf Orssich (Germany) Rudolf Sauerwein	Adler Trumpf Super Rennlimousine	1.227
6	-	750	59	(France) Amédée Gordini	(France) Jean Viale (France) Albert Alin	Simca 5 Gordini	1.214
7	-	2.0	34	(Germany) Adlerwerke	(Germany) Otto Löhr (Germany) Paul von Guilleaume	Adler Trumpf Super Rennlimousine	1.211
8	-	1.5	36	(United Kingdom) A.C. Scott (private entrant)	(United Kingdom) Archie Scott (United Kingdom) Ted Halford	HRG Le Mans	1.205
9=	-	3.0	19	(France) Société R.V.	(France) Jacques de Valence de Minardière (France) Louis Gérard	Delage D6-70	1.176
9=	-	2.0	25	(France) Émile Darl'mat	(France) Charles de Cortanze (France) Maurice Serre	Peugeot 302 Darl'mat Spéciale Sport	1.176
9=	-	2.0	26	(France) Émile Darl'mat	(France) Jean Pujol (France) Marcel Contet	Peugeot 302 Darl'mat Spéciale Sport	1.176
14	1st	2.0	31	(United Kingdom) C.T. Thomas (private entrant)	(United Kingdom) Robert Hichens (United Kingdom) Mortimer Morris-Goodall	Aston Martin Speed Model	1.127
16	2nd	1.1	54	(United Kingdom) Capt. G.E.T. Eyston	(United Kingdom) Dorothy Stanley-Turner (United Kingdom) Enid Riddell	MG Midget PB	1.070

- Note: A score of 1.00 means meeting the minimum distance for the car, and a higher score is exceeding the nominal target distance. Only the top 12 of the 17 finishers of this year's competition are listed. There were only two eligible cars in the Biennial Cup that finished.

=== Class winners ===
Class	Winning car	Winning drivers
over 5-litre	no entries	
3 to 5-litre (new class)	#2 Bugatti Type 57G	Wimille / Benoist *
2 to 3-litre	#19 Delage D6-70	Gérard / de Valence de Minardière *
1500 to 2000cc	#33 Adler Super Trumpf	Sauerwein / Graf Orssich *
1100 to 1500cc	#37 Aston Martin Ulster	Murton-Neale / Skeffington
750 to 1100cc (new class)	#48 Simca Six Gordini	Vernet / Largeot *
Up to 750cc (new class)	#59 Simca Cinq Gordini	Viale / Alin *
Note *: setting a new class distance record.

=== Statistics ===
- Fastest Lap – J-P. Wimille, #2 Bugatti Type 57G – 5:13.0secs; 155.18 km/h (96.42 mph)
- Winning Distance – 3,287.94 km (2,043.03 mi)
- Winner's Average Speed – 137.00 km/h (85.13 mph)
- Attendance – 100000
