= Jean-Pierre Wimille =

French racing driver (1908–1949)

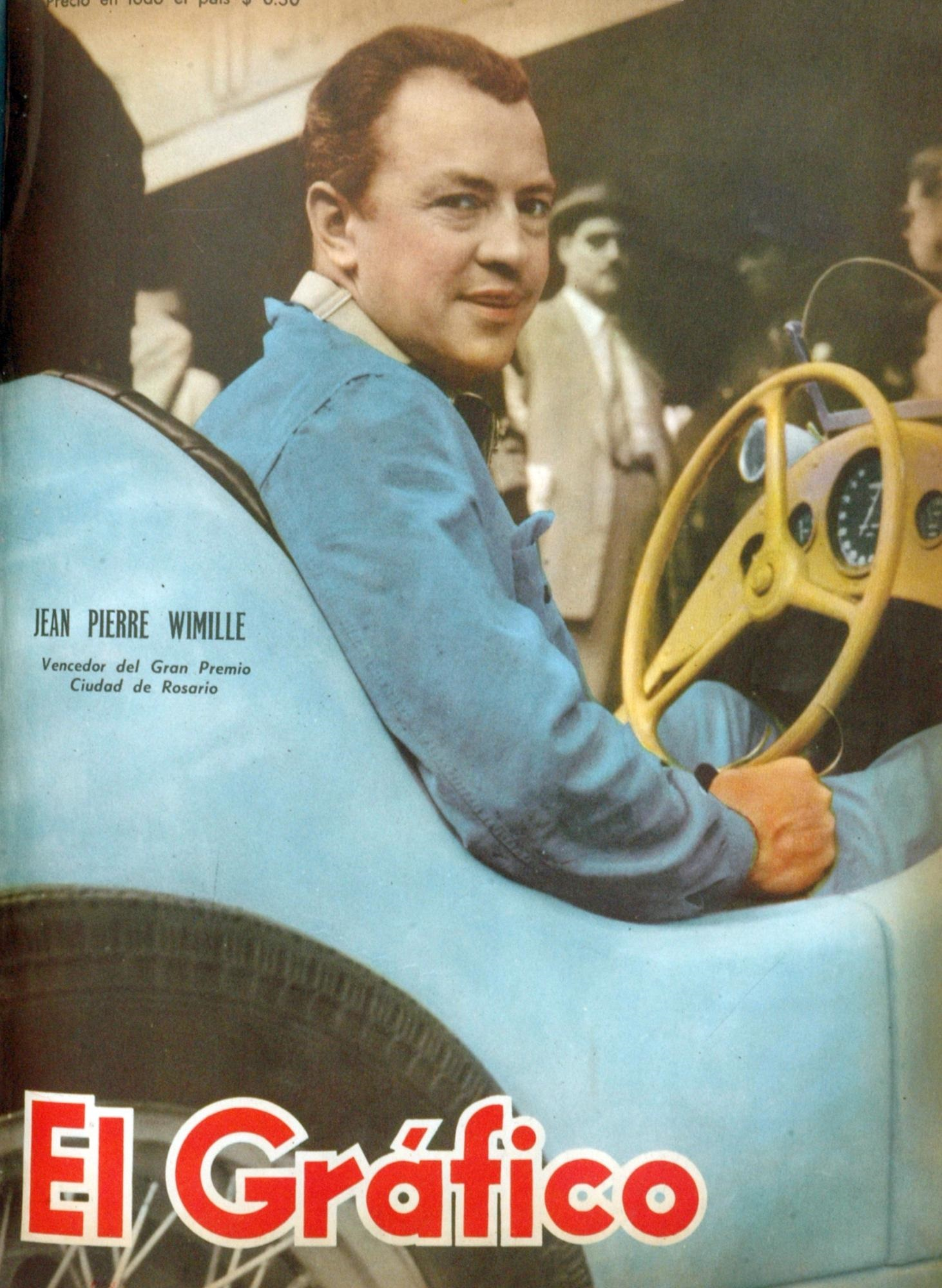
- Wimille on the cover of El Gráfico magazine, 1948
- Nationality: (France) French
- Born: 26 February 1908 16th arrondissement of Paris, France
- Died: 28 January 1949 (aged 40) Buenos Aires, Argentina

Championship titles
- Major victories 24 Hours of Le Mans (1937, 1939)

Champ Car career
- 1 race run over 1 year
- Best finish: 8th (1936)
- First race: 1936 Vanderbilt Cup (Westbury)
Wins	Podiums	Poles
0	1	0

24 Hours of Le Mans career
- Years: 1937, 1939
- Teams: Labric, privateer
- Best finish: 1st (1937, 1939)
- Class wins: 2 (1937, 1939)

Jean-Pierre Wimille (French pronunciation: [ʒɑ̃pjɛʁ vimil]; 26 February 1908 – 28 January 1949) was a French racing driver and a member of the French Resistance during World War II. He was a two-time victor of the 24 Hours of Le Mans, winning in 1937 and 1939. He is generally regarded as one of the best French drivers of his era. In 1949, he was killed when he crashed his car into a tree while practicing for a race.

Wimille was an agent for the covert Special Operations Executive of Britain in World War II. He joined fellow race-car drivers William Grover-Williams and Robert Benoist in the resistance against the German occupation of France. He survived the war; Grover-Williams and Benoist were captured by the Germans and executed.

== Biography ==
Wimille was born in Paris, France to a father who was employed as the motoring correspondent for the Petit Parisien newspaper. Jean-Pierre Wimille developed a fascination with racing cars at a young age. He was 22 years old when he made his Grand Prix debut, driving a Bugatti 37A at the 1930 French Grand Prix in Pau.

=== Driving career ===
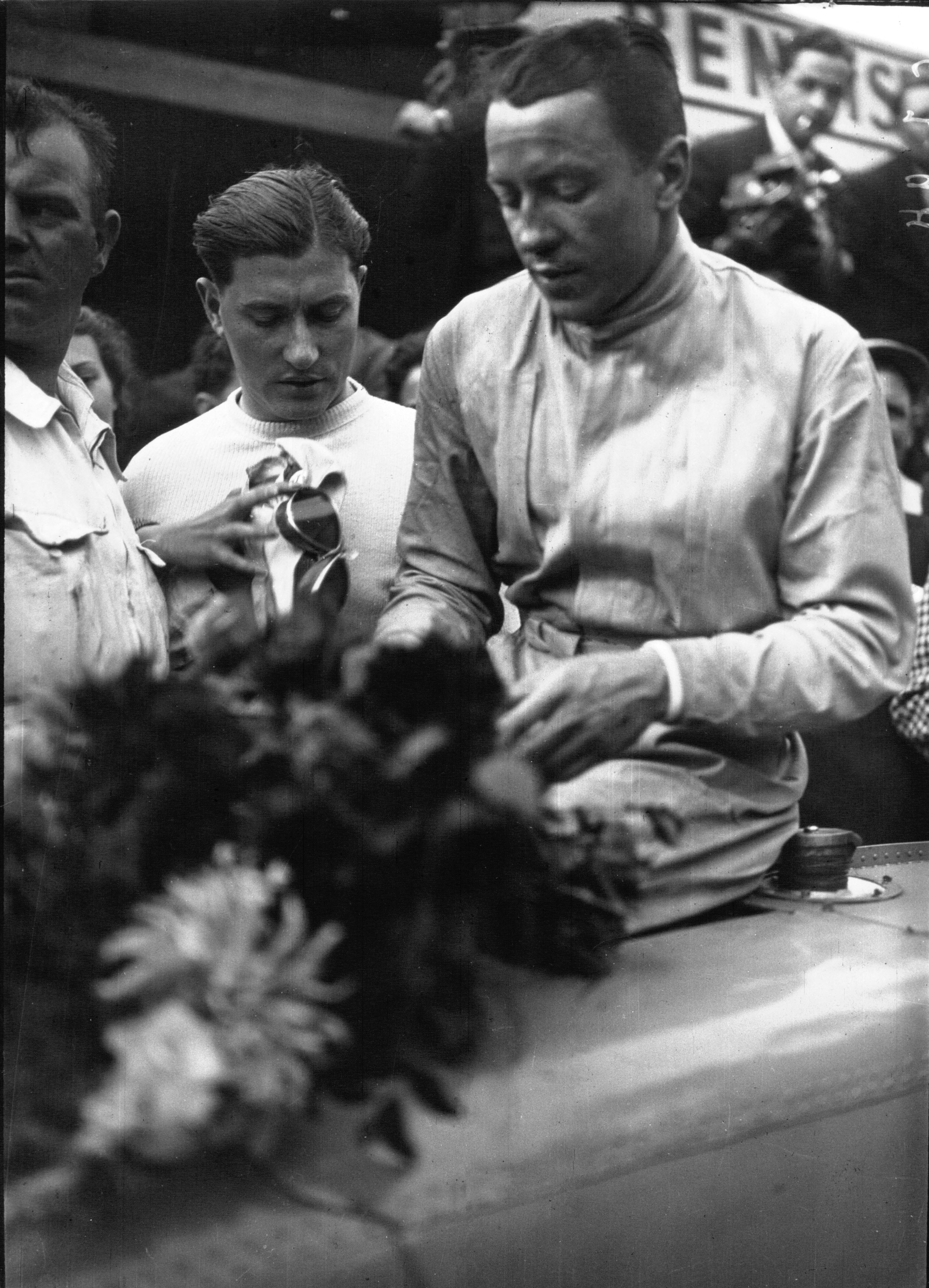
Wimille after winning the 1936 Grand Prix de Deauville

In 1931, Wimille finished second at the Monte Carlo Rally, driving a Lorraine-Dietrich. Driving a Bugatti T51, in 1932 he won the La Turbie hill climb, the Grand Prix de Lorraine and the Grand Prix d'Oran. In 1934 he was the victor at the Algerian Grand Prix in Algiers driving a Bugatti T59 and in January 1936 he finished second in the South African Grand Prix held at the Prince George Circuit in East London, South Africa then won the French Grand Prix in his home country.

Still in France, that same year Wimille won the Deauville Grand Prix, a race held on the city's streets. He won in his Bugatti T59 in an accident-marred race that killed drivers Raymond Chambost and Marcel Lehoux in separate incidents. Of the sixteen cars that started the race, only three managed to finish.

In 1936, Wimille traveled to Long Island, New York to compete in the Vanderbilt Cup where he finished second, behind the winner, Tazio Nuvolari. He also competed in the 24 hours of Le Mans endurance race, winning in 1937 and again in 1939. In 1940, Wimille developed with Marcel Lesurque an electric car able to reach 50 km/h.

=== World War II ===
Wimille and fellow Grand Prix race drivers Robert Benoist and William Grover-Williams joined the clandesine Special Operations Executive of Britain, which aided the French Resistance during the 1940-1944 occupation of France by Nazi Germany. Wimille was the only one of the three to survive the war.

With the outbreak of World War II in 1939, Wimille joined the French air force, but after France's defeat in June 1940 he was demobilized. His racing career halted because of the war, he spent his time designing an electric car. In late 1943, he was recruited by fellow race-car driver Robert Benoist as an agent for SOE. Benoist's network was based near Nantes and was called Clergyman. Wimille joined Benoist's network, becoming his deputy, along with wireless operator Denise Bloch and others. The operatives of Clergyman achieved their objective of destroying several power line pylons.

On 18 June 1944, the Germans raided Benoist's chateau near Sermaise, Essonne and captured several members of the Clergyman network, including Bloch (who was later executed). Wimille escaped by running into the forest and hiding beneath the roots of a tree growing over a small stream with only his head above the water. After the Germans departed, he sheltered at a farm and later made his way to Paris. Wimille's lover and future wife, Christiane de la Fressange ("Cric"), a former member of the French national ski team, was among those captured. Cric escaped from the Germans in August 1944 while being transported by train to a concentration camp in Germany. Her brother found her by chance and helped her pose as a Red Cross nurse and escape.

After his escape, Wimille continued to be involve in the resistance movement. Following the Liberation of Paris in August 1944, he worked as a liaison officer with the invading Allied forces. He later joined the Armée de l'air, in which he flew reconnaissance missions using Bell P-63s and held the rank of Lieutenant. The near-miraculous escapes from the Germans by Wimille and his future wife led to unfounded suspicions that they were double agents.

=== Post-World War II ===
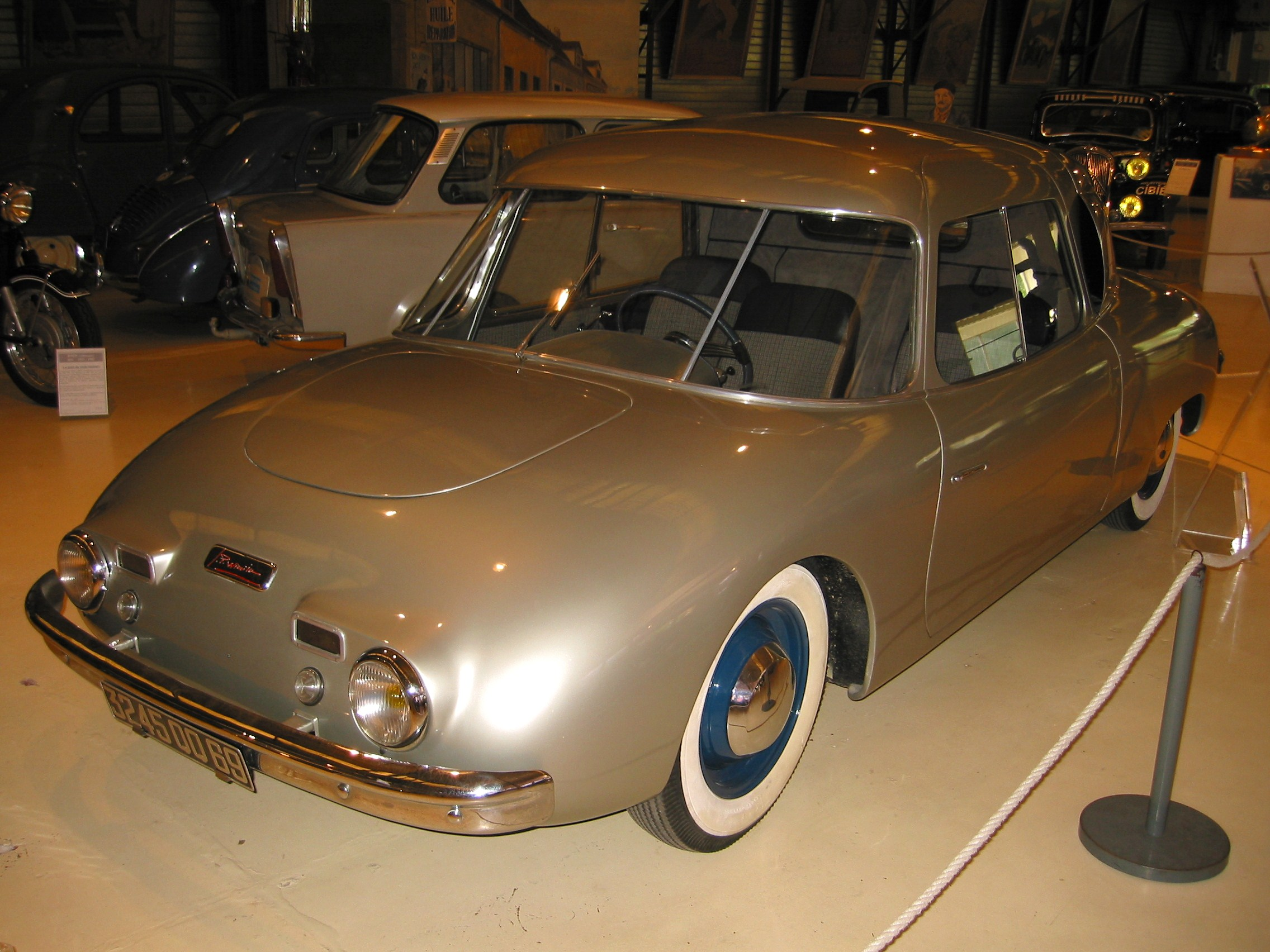
1948 Wimille-constructed automobile

Wimille married Christiane de la Fressange with whom he had a son, François, born in 1946. He took part in and won the 1945 Coupe des Prisonniers — one of the first races following the end of the war — driving a pre-war Bugatti Type 59/50B. For the 1946 season, he rotated driving for Ecurie Naphtra Course and Alfa Corse, the factory team for Alfa Romeo. In 1947, he rotated between Alfa Romeo and Equipe Gordini, winning multiple races across the season. This arraignment continued for 1948, with multiple dominant wins, including at his home French Grand Prix. During these years, he became the defacto leader of the Alfa Romeo factory team. He had a long-standing affair with French singer Juliette Gréco, whom he met in 1947 at the Tabou in Paris.

From 1946 on, Wimille built and designed cars in Paris under the brand-name Wimille. Between 1946 and 1950 around eight cars were built, at first with Citroën engines, later with Ford V8 engines.

=== Death ===
Wimille died when he lost control of his Simca-Gordini and crashed into a tree during practice runs for the 1949 Buenos Aires Grand Prix. He is buried in the Cimetière de Passy in Paris. There is a memorial to him at the Porte Dauphine on the edge of the Bois de Boulogne in Paris.

== Motorsports career results ==
Some of Jean-Pierre Wimille's race victories:

1932:

- Hill climb Nice - La Turbie - Bugatti Type 54
- Grand Prix de Lorraine - Alfa Romeo 8C
- Grand Prix d'Oran - Alfa Romeo 8C

1934:

- Grand Prix of Algeria – Bugatti T59

1936:

- French Grand Prix – Bugatti T57G
- Grand Prix de la Marne – Bugatti T57G
- Deauville Grand Prix – Bugatti T59
- Grand Prix du Comminges – Bugatti T59/57

1937:

- Pau Grand Prix – Bugatti T57G (The Tank)
- Grand Prix de Böne – Bugatti T57
- 24 hours of Le Mans – Bugatti T57G driving with Robert Benoist
- Grand Prix de la Marne – Bugatti T57

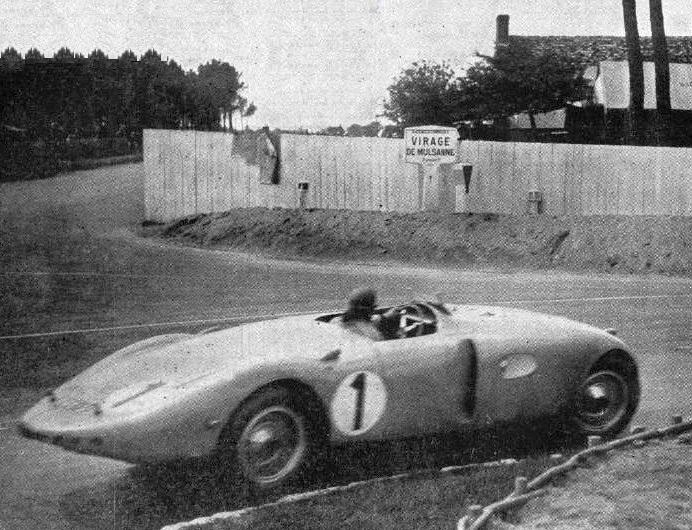
Jean-Pierre Wimille and Pierre Veyron winners of the 1939 24 Hours of Le Mans on a Bugatti Type 57C

1939:

- Coupe de Paris - Bugatti Type 59
- Grand Prix du Centenaire Luxembourg – Bugatti T57S45
- 24 hours of Le Mans – Bugatti Type 57C driving with Pierre Veyron

Post War – 1945:

- Coupe des Prisonniers – Bugatti Type 59

1946:

- Coupe de la Résistance – Alfa Romeo 308
- Grand Prix du Roussillon – Alfa Romeo 308
- Grand Prix de Bourgogne – Alfa Romeo 308
- Grand Prix des Nations – Geneva (Heat 1) – Alfa Romeo 158

1947:

- Swiss Grand Prix – Alfa Romeo 158
- Belgian Grand Prix – Alfa Romeo 158
- Coupe de Paris - Simca-Gordini T15

1948:

- Grand Prix de Rosario – Simca-Gordini T15
- French Grand Prix – Alfa Romeo 158
- Italian Grand Prix – Alfa Romeo 158
- Autodrome Grand Prix – Alfa Romeo 158/47

=== European Championship results ===
(key) (Races in bold indicate pole position) (Races in italics indicate fastest lap)

Year	Entrant	Chassis	Engine	1	2	3	4	5	6	7	EDC	Pts
1931	J.-P. Wimille	Bugatti T51	Bugatti 2.3 L8	ITA; 4	FRA; Ret	BEL; Ret					6th	14
1932	J-P. Wimille	Alfa Romeo Monza	Alfa Romeo 2.3 L8	ITA	FRA; Ret	GER					16th	21
1935	Automobiles E. Bugatti	Bugatti T59	Bugatti 3.3 L8	MON	FRA	BEL; Ret	GER	SUI	ITA; Ret	**ESP**; 4	18th	49
1936	Automobiles E. Bugatti	Bugatti T59	Bugatti 3.3 L8	MON; 6	**GER**; Ret						14th	26
1936	Automobiles E. Bugatti	Bugatti T59/50B	Bugatti 4.7 L8			SUI; Ret	ITA				14th	26
1938	Automobiles E. Bugatti	Bugatti T59/50B3	Bugatti 3.0 L8	FRA; Ret	GER						11th	25
1938	Alfa Corse	Alfa Romeo Tipo 312	Alfa Romeo 3.0 V12			SUI; 7	ITA; Ret				11th	25

=== Post-WWII Grandes Épreuves results ===
(key) (Races in bold indicate pole position) (Races in italics indicate fastest lap)

Year	Entrant	Chassis	Engine	1	2	3	4	Ref
1947	Alfa Corse	Alfa Romeo 158	Alfa Romeo 158 1.5 L8s	**SUI**; 1	**BEL**; 1	ITA	FRA	
1948	Equipe Gordini	Simca-Gordini T11	Simca-Gordini 1.4 L4	MON; Ret				
1948	Alfa Corse	Alfa Romeo 158	Alfa Romeo 158 1.5 L8s		**SUI**; 2	**FRA**; 1	**ITA**; 1	

=== 24 Hours of Le Mans results ===
Year	Team	Co-Drivers	Car	Class	Laps	Pos.	Class Pos.
1937	(France) Roger Labric	(France) Robert Benoist	Bugatti Type 57	5.0	243	**1st**	**1st**
1939	(France) Jean-Pierre Wimille	(France) Pierre Veyron	Bugatti Type 57	8.0	248	**1st**	**1st**

Preceded by Johnny Hindmarsh; Luis Fontés	Winner of the 24 Hours of Le Mans; 1937 with: Robert Benoist	Succeeded by Eugène Chaboud; Jean Trémoulet
Preceded by Eugène Chaboud; Jean Trémoulet	Winner of the 24 Hours of Le Mans; 1939 with: Pierre Veyron	Succeeded by Luigi Chinetti; Peter Mitchell-Thomson
