= Robert Benoist =

French racing driver (1895–1944)

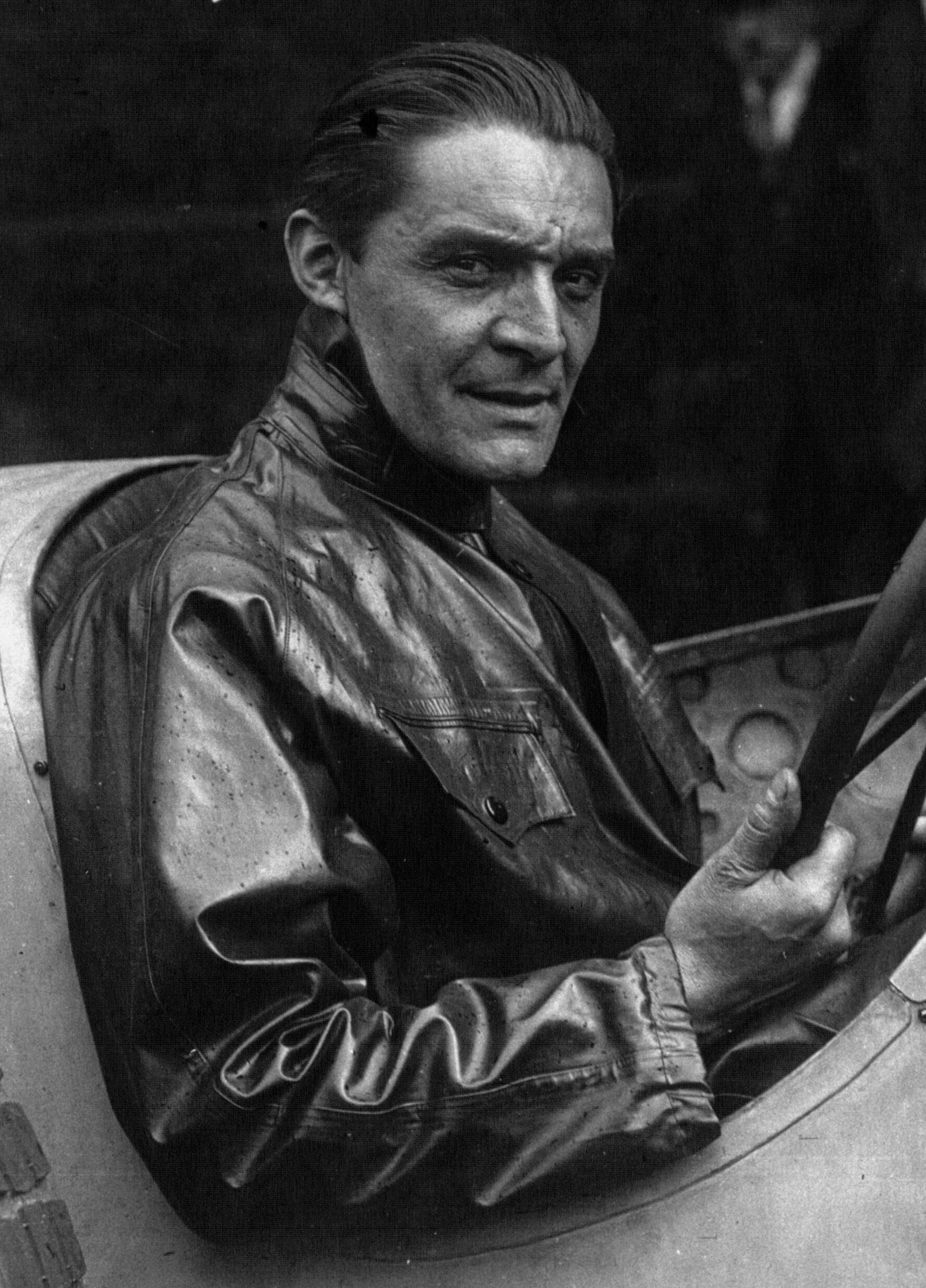
- Benoist at Monza in 1927
- Nationality: (France) French
- Born: Robert Marcel Charles Benoist; 20 March 1895 Auffargis, France
- Died: 11 September 1944 (aged 49) Buchenwald, Germany

24 Hours of Le Mans career
- Years: 1928–1937
- Teams: Itala; Grand Garage Saint-Didier Paris; Roger Labric
- Best finish: 1st (1937)
- Class wins: 2 (1928, 1937)

Robert Marcel Charles Benoist (French pronunciation: [ʁɔbɛʁ bənwa]; 20 March 1895 – 11 September 1944) was a French Grand Prix motor racing driver. He won several Grand Prix racing events and the 24 Hours of Le Mans between 1924 and 1937.

During World War II, Benoist resisted the German occupation of France and worked as an agent in France for the clandestine British Special Operations Executive (SOE) organization. SOE's objectives were to conduct espionage, sabotage, and reconnaissance in countries occupied by the Axis powers, especially those occupied by Nazi Germany. SOE agents allied themselves with French resistance groups and supplied them with weapons and equipment. In 1943, Benoist was captured by the Germans in Paris, but escaped and fled to Britain. Returning to France, he led a sabotage campaign around Nantes, but he was captured again in June 1944 and executed.

== Early life ==
Benoist was born in Auffargis, near Rambouillet, Île-de-France, France on 20 March 1895. He was the son of Jeanne and Gaston Benoist. His father was the gamekeeper of Baron Henri de Rothschild's estate. Benoist had an older brother named Maurice. During World War I, Robert Benoist served in the French army but soon became a fighter pilot in the French Air Force. Benoist married Paule Ajustron when he was 27 years old and the couple had a child, Jacqueline. Benoist also had a mistress, Huguette Stocker.

== Grand Prix driver ==
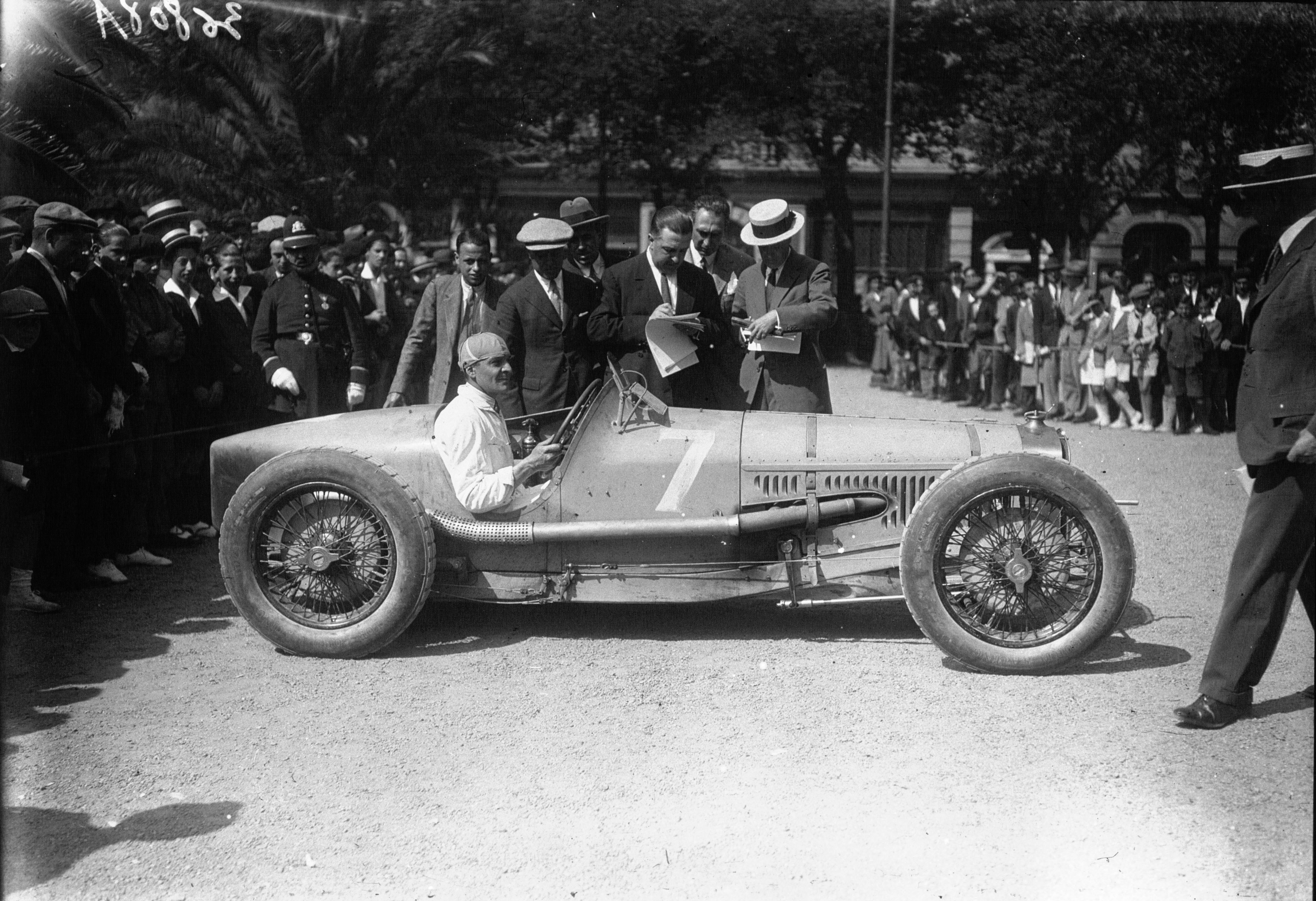
Benoist at the 1926 San Sebastián Grand Prix

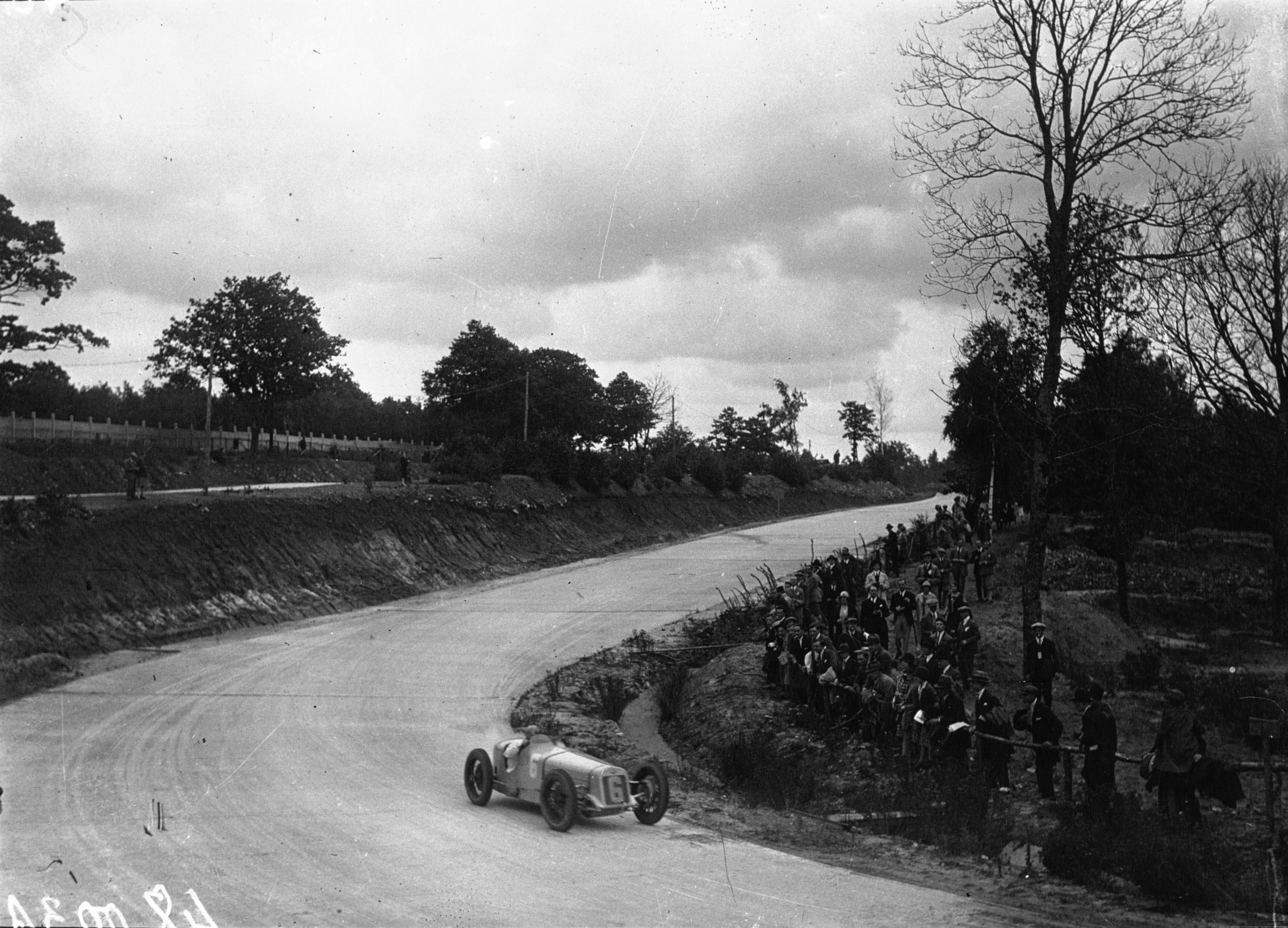
Benoist, French Grand Prix, 1927

Looking for excitement in the post-war world, Benoist joined the de Marçay car company as a test driver. He then moved on to Salmson and was very successful in cyclecar races before being signed to drive for Delage in 1924. The next year, teamed with Albert Divo, he won the French Grand Prix in the race that claimed the life of Italian racing star Antonio Ascari.

In 1927, driving a Delage 15-S-8, he won the French, Spanish, Italian and British Grand Prix races, earning the season championship title for the French manufacturer.

When the Delage company dropped out of racing, Robert Benoist was without a job and was appointed manager of the Banville Garage in Paris. He did occasional races for the Bugatti team, finishing second in the 1928 San Sebastián Grand Prix in Spain.

The following year, Benoist teamed up with Attilio Marinoni to win the Spa 24 Hours race in Belgium, driving an Alfa Romeo. At the end of the season he retired until 1934, when he made a comeback with the Bugatti team. He was soon made head of the competition department and masterminded the company's Le Mans programme. In 1937 he partnered with Jean-Pierre Wimille to win the 24 Hours of Le Mans endurance race. Following that victory, Benoist retired from driving, but continued to run Bugatti's racing department.

== World War II ==
France was defeated and occupied by Nazi Germany in 1940. The United Kingdom, headed by Winston Churchill, created the clandestine Special Operations Executive (SOE) to contest German occupation of France and other countries by encouraging French resistance to Germany and providing the resistance with arms and supplies. On 29 May 1942, SOE agent William Grover-Williams, a former race car driver and rival of Benoist, parachuted into France. Grover-Williams' job was to create a network, called "Chestnut," to operate near Paris and assist the incipient French resistance. Beginning in mid-February 1943, Chestnut received from SOE headquarters six large parachute drops of weapons and other supplies for the French resistance. The arms and other supplies were stored at the Benoist chateau for future use.

The downfall of the Chestnut network began on 31 July 1943 when a German direction-finding van pinpointed the location of Chestnut's radio operator Roland Dowlen and captured him. On 1 August, Robert's brother, Maurice, was captured. The next day Maurice Benoist led the German Sicherheitsdienst (SD) to the Benoist chateau at Auffargis. Grover-Williams was found hiding in a stable and arrested. The Germans recovered many containers of arms and equipment at the chateau. Dowlen and Grover-Williams were later executed by the Germans.

=== Capture and escape ===
Benoist had not been at the chateau during the German raid. Hearing of the raid, he went into hiding, but attempted to find out what had happened. The German SD intercepted one of his phone calls and learned that he was at the Place Gambetta in Paris. On 4 August, Benoist was apprehended by three Germans as he was leaving a telephone booth. While he was being driven to SD headquarters, he managed to open a door on the moving automobile, push a German out the door, jump out of the auto, and disappear into the crowd on the busy street. Benoist took refuge in the apartment of a friend. With the Germans closing in on him, Benoist escaped over the roofs of neighboring buildings. Entering one building, a night watchman recognised him as the famous race car driver and said, "You look as though you could use a drink." Benoist and the watchman shared a drink and then Benoist continued his flight. Benoist next took refuge for twelve days in the apartment of his secretary, Stella Tayssedre, who kept him informed of what she knew of the German search for him.

Benoist's plight as a fugitive was not unique. The Germans were capturing many SOE agents and hundreds of their French supporters during the summer of 1943. Benoist got in touch with Henri Dericourt, SOE's air movements officer in France (and later believed to be a double agent working also for the Germans). Dericourt arranged for a Royal Air Force Lockheed Hudson to land secretly on a farm field near Angers on the night of 19 August to pick up Benoist and nine SOE agents who were also on the run. Benoist took a train to the village of Briollay (near Angers), walked three miles to the farm field, waited in the darkness for the plane to arrive, and joined the other SOE agents in boarding the plane for the flight to England. They arrived safely.

=== Back to France ===
Benoist trained in explosives while in England. Because of his fame SOE was reluctant to send him back to France, but on the night of 19-20 October 1943, he flew back to France on a limited mission to create the Clergyman network. His code name was "Lionel". His job was to organise a group to destroy the power pylons across the Loire River at Île Héron near Nantes. Benoist went beyond his mandate, visited Paris, and made plans (never realised) to assassinate senior German SD officials in France. Lacking explosives to carry out the destruction of the pylons he returned to Britain by clandestine flight on the night of 4-5 February 1944.

At SOE headquarters in London, Benoist argued that he should be allowed to return to France to carry out his plan to destroy the power pylons. SOE granted his wish but banned him from visiting Paris, where he was too well known, and added the additional task for him to destroy the telephone networks in Nantes when instructed to do so by SOE. To carry out the mission, Benoist was given 500,000 francs (about 50,000 British pounds in 2022 values) and told to request more money if necessary. To facilitate communication, Denise Bloch, a radio operator with previous SOE experience in France, accompanied him.

Benoist and Bloch returned to France the night of 2-3 March 1944 via airplane, landing in a farm field. In late April and early May, they received three large parachute drops of arms for the resistance and additional radios. On 16 May, Benoist's saboteurs blew up the Île Héron power pylons supplying Nantes, leaving the city without power for a week. On 26 May they again destroyed the repaired pylons. On 28 May allied bombers bombed Nantes. This was all in preparation for the D-Day invasion of France which would occur on 6 June in Normandy, about 250 km (160 miles) north of Nantes. On 5 June, Benoist was told via radio that the invasion of France was imminent and he alerted the resistance which destroyed the telephone system of Nantes and sabotaged railroads. The allied plan was for the resistance to disrupt German communications and transport throughout France, prior to and after the invasion.

On 17 June, Benoist called a meeting of the key members of the network at his villa near Sermaise, a violation of SOE's guidance that members of a network should have as little contact with each other as possible. During dinner, he announced that he had received news that his mother was dying in Paris and he was leaving to visit her. He warned that if he didn't return by lunch the next day, 18 June, the members of the network should disperse. Benoist's mother died before he arrived in Paris and he and his sister, Charlotte Perdrigé (a courier for Benoist), were captured by Germans waiting for Benoist in a safe house. They were interrogated and one of them may have told the Germans of the Sermaise meeting, assuming that the group there had dispersed. However, Benoist's instruction to his associates to disperse had not been heeded and at 8 p.m. on 18 June the Sicherheitsdienst (SD) raided the villa and captured Bloch and the others.

=== Imprisonment and execution ===
Benoist attempted to escape shortly after his capture by climbing through a bathroom window, but was caught by the Germans. He was taken to SD headquarters at 84 Avenue Foch in Paris and interrogated by SD leader Josef Kieffer and his subordinates for nearly a month. Kieffer's methods of interrogation were often apparent kindness combined with suggestions that prisoner had been betrayed by one of his own and that SD knew all there was to know about him and his network. Benoist was led to believe that Violette Szabo, a celebrated SOE agent, had betrayed him.

On 8 August, Benoist and 36 other SOE agents, including three women, were loaded onto buses, given Red Cross parcels containing food, and taken to the railroad station where they boarded a train for Germany. The allied armies were approaching Paris and would capture the city on 25 August. Benoist was chained to George Wilkinson during the trip. Wilkinson described him as "charming", a person "one could trust," and "one who could have been the leader of the group if he had tried." During the trip, the train was attacked and disabled by allied fighter planes, although none of the prisoners were hurt. The prisoners were loaded onto trucks and continued their journey to Neue Bremm a concentration camp near the city of Saarbrücken. Some of the prisoners, led by F. F. E. Yeo-Thomas, supported by Benoist, wanted to attempt an escape, but others disagreed and forced the abandonment of the escape plan. The prisoners opposing the escape attempt harbored the thought that they would be treated as prisoners-of-war rather than spies. After a few days of brutal treatment, all 34 of the male prisoners were loaded into trucks and taken to Buchenwald concentration camp. The three women were sent to Ravensbrück, a camp for women.

On 9 September at Buchenwald, the camp commandant received an order to give 16 of the prisoners "special treatment." At Buchenwald that meant execution by being choked to death while suspended above the floor on a meat hook. Benoist was among the 16 executed on 11 September 1944. Thirteen of 18 SOE agents remaining in Buchenwald were also executed or died of disease. Five survived. The Germans executed the three women SOE prisoners on 5 February 1945. Benoist's radio operator, Denise Bloch, was one of them.

== Legacy ==
Following Germany's surrender, on 9 September 1945, the "Coupe Robert Benoist" automobile race was held in Paris in his memory. The race was won by his racing and resistance colleague Jean-Pierre Wimille. The village of Auffargis named a street after him and the Linas-Monthléry race track honored Benoist with a monument. Among the grandstands at the former Reims-Gueux circuit in France is one named "Tribune Robert Benoist".

Captain Robert Benoist is recorded on the Brookwood Memorial in Surrey, Britain as one of the SOE agents who died for the liberation of France. He is listed on the "Roll of Honor" on the Valençay SOE Memorial in the town of Valençay, in the Indre departement of France.

== Racing record ==
=== Complete 24 Hours of Le Mans results ===
Year	Team	Co-Drivers	Car	Class	Laps	Pos.	Class Pos.
1928	(Italy) Itala SA Fabbrica Automobili	(France) Christian Dauvergne	Itala Tipo 65 S	2.0	131	8th	1st
1929	(France) Grand Garage Saint-Didier Paris	(France) Henri Stoffel	Chrysler Six Series 75	5.0	152	6th	4th
1937	(France) Roger Labric	(France) Jean-Pierre Wimille	Bugatti Type 57 G Tank	5.0	243	1st	1st

== Bibliography ==
- Au volant: Cours pratique de conduite automobile, Bernard-Précy, Robert Benoist, Paris, Ed. Tallandier 1933
- Foot, MRD: SOE in France (HMSO, London 1966)
- Ryan Robert: Early One Morning, Headline 2002 ISBN 0-7472-6872-X
- Pernod Alain: Grand Prix de France : Un siècle en histoires, ed. ETAI, 2006, ISBN 2-7268-8657-4
- Saward, Joe: "The Grand Prix Saboteurs", Morienval Press, London, 2006, ISBN 978-0-9554868-0-7
- Motor Sport, August 1945, Page 156.

Sporting positions
Preceded by Johnny Hindmarsh; Luis Fontés	Winner of the 24 Hours of Le Mans; 1937 with: Jean-Pierre Wimille	Succeeded by Eugène Chaboud; Jean Trémoulet
