= Eugène Chaboud =

French racing driver (1907–1983)

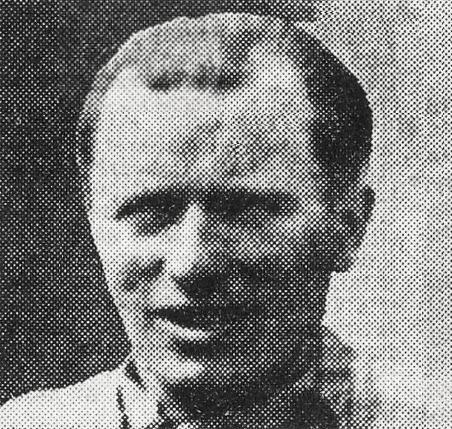
- Born: Marius Eugène Chaboud; 12 April 1907; Lyon, France
- Died: 28 December 1983 (aged 76); Montfermeil, France

Formula One World Championship career
- Nationality: (France) French
- Active years: 1950 – 1951
- Team: Talbot-Lago
- Entries: 3
- Championships: 0
- Wins: 0
- Podiums: 0
- Career points: 1
- Pole positions: 0
- Fastest laps: 0
- First entry: 1950 Belgian Grand Prix
- Last entry: 1951 French Grand Prix

Marius Eugène Chaboud (12 April 1907 – 28 December 1983) was a French racing driver. He participated in three Formula One World Championship Grands Prix, scoring one championship point. He also participated in numerous non-Championship Formula One races.

== Career ==
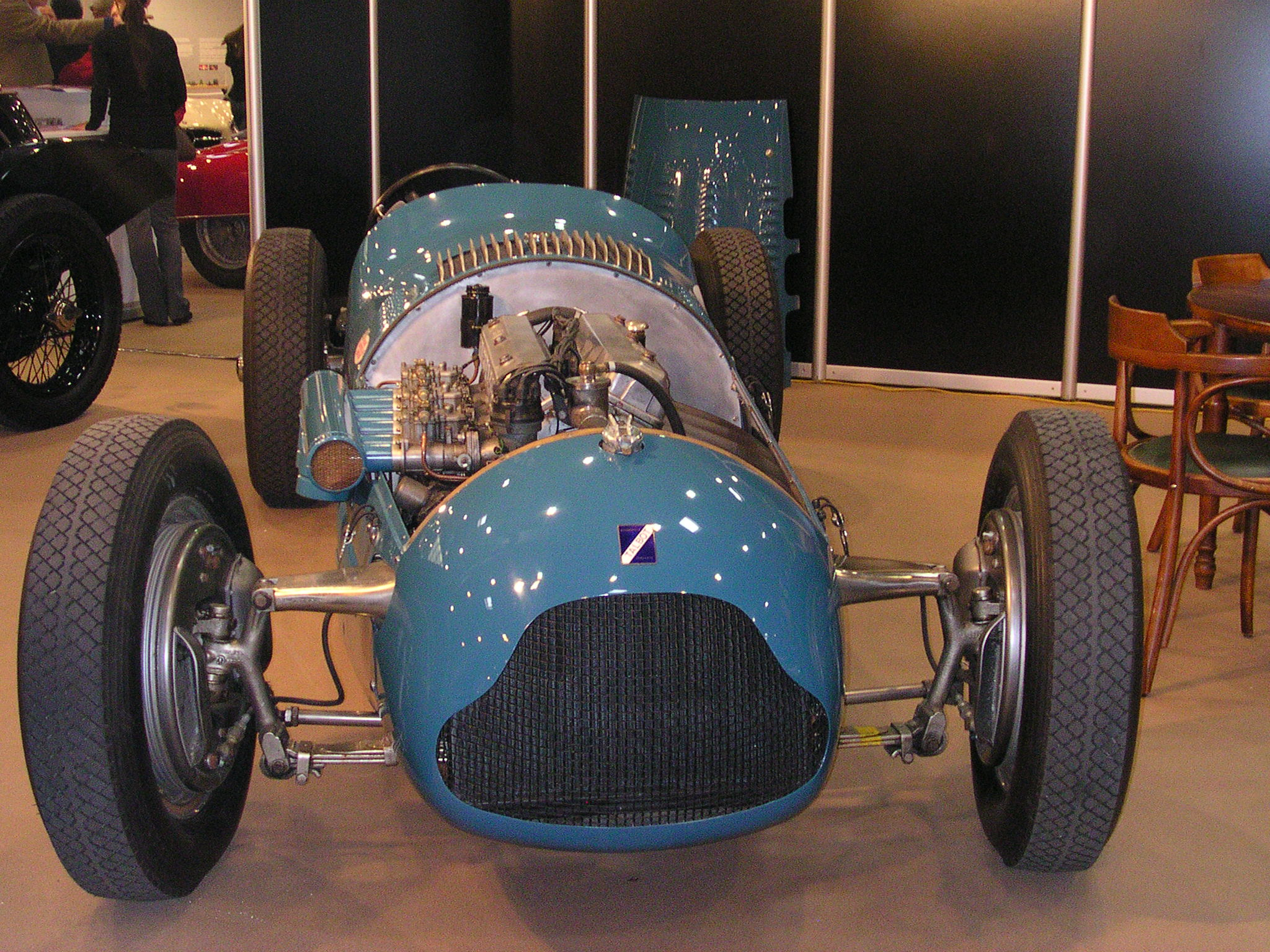
Talbot Lago T26 GS

Chaboud completed his first car race in 1936 aged 29 in a Delahaye sports car and partnered his mentor Jean Trémoulet in the 1937 24 Hours of Le Mans race, where they failed to finish. The following year however the partnership won the race in a Delahaye. In 1939 he won the Paris-Nice road race for Ecurie France and after the Second World War he won the 1946 Belgian Grand Prix at Bois de la Cambre in a Delage.

After Formula 1 was introduced in 1950, Chaboud drove a Talbot Lago T26 in several Formula 1 events, including three Grand Prix World Championship races, during 1950 and 1951, scoring 1 championship point for a fifth place in the French Grand Prix.

Chaboud retired from the sport after crashing his Talbot-Lago T26 at Le Mans during the 1952 event, when he became trapped under his car.

== Racing record ==
=== Complete Formula One World Championship results ===
(key)

Year	Entrant	Chassis	Engine	1	2	3	4	5	6	7	8	WDC	Points
1950	Ecurie Lutetia	Talbot-Lago T26C	Talbot Straight-6	GBR	MON	500	SUI	BEL; Ret				20th	1
1950	Philippe Étancelin	Talbot-Lago T26C-DA	Talbot Straight-6						FRA; 5 *	ITA		20th	1
1951	Eugène Chaboud	Talbot-Lago T26C-GS	Talbot Straight-6	SUI	500	BEL	FRA; 8	GBR	GER	ITA	ESP	NC	0

* Indicates shared drive with Philippe Étancelin. Chaboud had entered his Ecurie Lutetia Talbot-Lago but did not race this car.

=== Complete 24 Hours of Le Mans results ===
Year	Team	Co-Drivers	Car	Class	Laps	Pos.	Class Pos.
1937	(France) Eugéne Chaboud (private entrant)	(France) Jean Trémoulet	Delahaye 135CS	5.0	9	DNF	
1938	(France) Eugène Chaboud / Jean Trémoulet (private entrant)	(France) Jean Trémoulet	Delahaye 135CS	5.0	235	1st	1st
1949	(France) Ecurie Charles Pozzi (private entrant)	(France) Charles Pozzi	Delahaye 175S	S5.0	52	DNF (Electrics / fire)	
1951	(France) E. Chaboud (private entrant)	(France) Lucien Vincent	Talbot-Lago T26 GS Biplace	S5.0	33	DNF (Radiator)	
1952	(France) E. Chaboud (private entrant)	(France) Charles Pozzi	Talbot-Lago T26 GS Spyder	S5.0	?	DNF (Accident)	

Sporting positions
Preceded by Jean-Pierre Wimille; Robert Benoist	Winner of the 24 Hours of Le Mans; 1938; With: Jean Trémoulet	Succeeded by Jean-Pierre Wimille; Pierre Veyron
