= Jean Trémoulet =

French racing driver

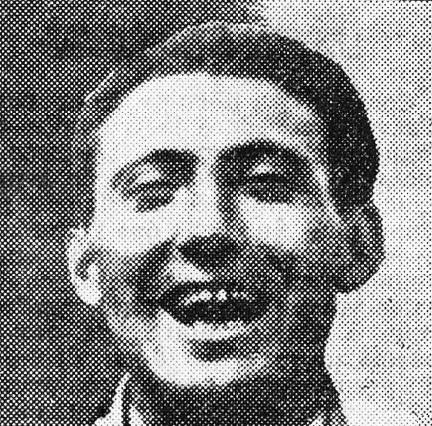
- Jean Trémoulet
- Nationality: (France) French
- Born: 12 April 1909 Dordogne, France
- Died: 13 October 1944 (aged 35) Dordogne, France

24 Hours of Le Mans career
- Years: 1937–1939
- Teams: Eugène Chaboud; Private
- Best finish: 1st (1937)
- Class wins: 1 (1937)

Jean Trémoulet (12 April 1909 – 13 October 1944) was a French racing driver who won the 1938 24 Hours of Le Mans with Eugène Chaboud. He died at 35 years old, as part of the French Resistance during World War II.

== Racing record ==
=== Complete 24 Hours of Le Mans results ===
Year	Team	Co-Drivers	Car	Class	Laps	Pos.	Class Pos.
1937	(France) Eugène Chaboud (private entrant)	(France) Eugène Chaboud	Delahaye 135CS	5.0	9	DNF	
1938	(France) Eugène Chaboud / Jean Trémoulet (private entrant)	(France) Eugène Chaboud	Delahaye 135CS	5.0	235	1st	1st
1939	(France) Jean Trémoulet (private entrant)	(France) Raoul Forestier	Talbot-Lago SS	5.0	68	DNF	

Sporting positions
Preceded by Jean-Pierre Wimille; Robert Benoist	Winner of the 24 Hours of Le Mans; 1938 with: Eugène Chaboud	Succeeded by Jean-Pierre Wimille; Pierre Veyron
