= Roger Labric =

French cyclist

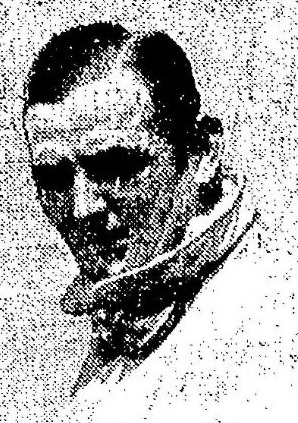
Roger Labric en 1933

Adrien Léon Jean Auguste Roger Labric (12 February 1893 – 24 May 1962) was a French journalist (specialising in aviation and motor racing), cyclist and racing driver. In 1920 he started in the Tour de France, but did not finish the race.

It was he who entered the Bugatti 57G cars in the 1937 Le Mans 24 Hour race (which saw victory for Wimille and Benoist in one of the cars).

As well as contributing to specialist magazines and newspapers, he wrote several books: notably several histories of aviation in the First World War, a history of the Le Mans 24 Hour race and a biography of his friend, Robert Benoist.

== Bibliography (possibly incomplete) ==
- Les Champs Bleus (vie courante d'une escadrille de combat) - Edouard-Joseph éditeur, 1923
- Un le l'aviation - Cosmopolites, 1932
- Classe 14 - Cosmopolites, 1932
- On se bat dans l'air - Nouvellese Editions Latines, 1933
- L'Avion de Minuit - Nouvelles Editions Latines, 1935
- La Grande Escadrille - Causse, Graille & Castelnau, Montpellier, 1941
- L'Escadre invisible - Editions Chantal, 1943
- Gisele Parachutiste - Editions Lajeunesse, 1945
- Carnet de Vol - Editions du Pavois, Paris, 1944
- Maurice Arnoux - Technique du livre, 1946
- Memoires d'un Avion de Combat - Société Privée d'Impression et d'Edition, Paris, 1946
- Robert Benoist, Champion du Monde - Edicta, Paris, 1946
- Les 24 Heures du Mans - Histoire d'une grande bataille pacifique et sportive - l'Automobile Club de l'Ouest, 1949 (illustrations by Géo Ham)
- Si la course vous était contée - Nouvellese Editions Latines
