= 1907 in motorsport =

The following is an overview of the events of 1907 in motorsport, including the major racing events, racing festivals, circuits that were opened and closed during that year, championships and non-championship events that were established and disestablished in that year, and births and deaths of racing drivers and other motorsport people.

== Annual events ==
The calendar includes only annual major non-championship events or annual events that had own significance separate from the championship. For the dates of the championship events see related season articles.

Date	Event	Ref
21 April	2nd Targa Florio	
28 May	1st Isle of Man TT	

== Opened motorsport venues ==
- 17 July - opening of Brooklands, the world's first purpose-built 'banked' motor racing circuit.

Aspendale Racecourse near Melbourne (1906) was the world's first purpose-built motor racing circuit. (Note: Several venues hosted auto races prior to the opening of Brooklands, but all were originally built for purposes other than motorsport. The Milwaukee Mile (1903), and Fairgrounds Speedway in Nashville (1904), were both originally built as horse racing tracks. Prior to the opening of Brooklands, Crystal Palace, London built a cycle track which was also used for motorcycle racing.)

== Births ==
Date	Month	Name	Nationality	Occupation	Note	Ref
12	April	Eugène Chaboud	French	Racing driver	24 Hours of Le Mans winner (1938).	
14	July	Chico Landi	Brazilian	Racing driver	The first Brazilian Formula One driver.	
8	September	Casimiro de Oliveira	Portuguese	Racing driver	The first Portuguese Formula One driver.	
25	November	John Stuart Hindmarsh	British	Racing driver	24 Hours of Le Mans winner (1936).	
