= Petar Orssich =

Austrian nobleman and racing driver (1907–61)

- Born: Petar Josef Georg Levin Graf Orssich von Slavetich; 4 May 1907 Vienna, Austria
- Died: 3 July 1961 (aged 54) Saint-Dizier, France

Petar Josef Georg Levin Graf Orssich von Slavetich (4 May 1907 – 3 July 1961) was an Austrian racing driver, whose greatest achievement was winning the Coupe Biennale at the 1938 24 Hours of Le Mans in an Adler Trumpf streamlined saloon, with Rudolph Sauerwein as co-driver. He was known when racing as Petar Orssich or Petar Graf Orssich, with the first name often mis-spelled Peter.

== Racing career ==
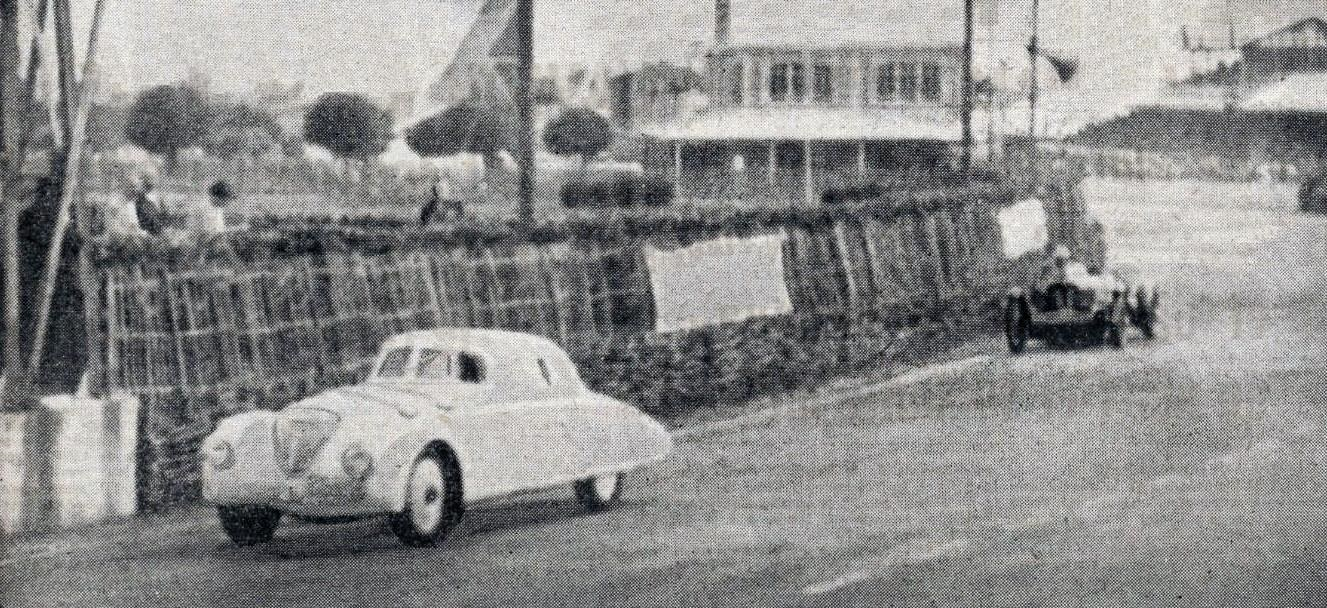
The Sauerwein/Orssich Adler at the 1937 Le Mans 24 Hours

Orssich's first competitive appearance of note was at the 1936 Coupe des Alpes, with one Hermann as his co-driver. When Adler entered the 24 Hours of Le Mans for the first time in 1936, Orssich was teamed up with Sauerwein as co-driver, but the race was cancelled; the duo however took part in the 24 Hours of Spa that year, and won their class, leading an Adler 1–2–3 in class (and 7–8–9 overall). At their belated Le Mans debut in 1937, the pair finished 6th, and won their class. They were kept together for the 1938 race, and finished 6th again. Although they only finished 2nd in class, the pair won the Index of Performance, beating team-mates Otto Löhr and Paul von Guilleaume, who had a 1.5 litre Adler, by 2 laps on the Index and 7 laps overall, and the Coupe Biennale.

Orssich took part in a touring car race in Antwerp in 1938 driving an Impéria, and also tried rallying after the Second World War, driving a Porsche 356 in the 1952 Alpine Rally.

== Personal life ==
Orssich was the son of Georg Franz Robert Graf Orssich von Slavetich (1865–1937) and Valeria Henriette Orssich Slavetich (1876–c. 1945). He was married twice, and had one son, Graf Aleksander Orssich von Slavetich (known after emigrating to Canada as Alec de Bac), with his first wife Erna.

== Le Mans results ==
Year	Team	Co-Drivers	Car	Class	Laps	Pos.	Class Pos.
1937	(Germany) Adlerwerke	(Germany) Rudolph Sauerwein	Adler Supertrumpf Rennlimousine	2.0	205	6th	1st
1938	(Germany) Adlerwerke	(Germany) Rudolph Sauerwein	Adler Supertrumpf Rennlimousine	2.0	215	6th	2nd
