= Rudolph Sauerwein =

German racing driver (1900 – 1956)

- Born: Rudolph Hermann Sauerwein; 22 December 1900 Mainz, Germany
- Died: 4 June 1956 (aged 55) Bad Homburg, Germany

Rudolph Hermann Sauerwein (22 December 1900 – 4 June 1956) was a German racing driver, who won his class and the Coupe Biennale at the 24 Hours of Le Mans in consecutive years, in a 2 litre Adler Trumpf streamlined saloon.

== Career ==
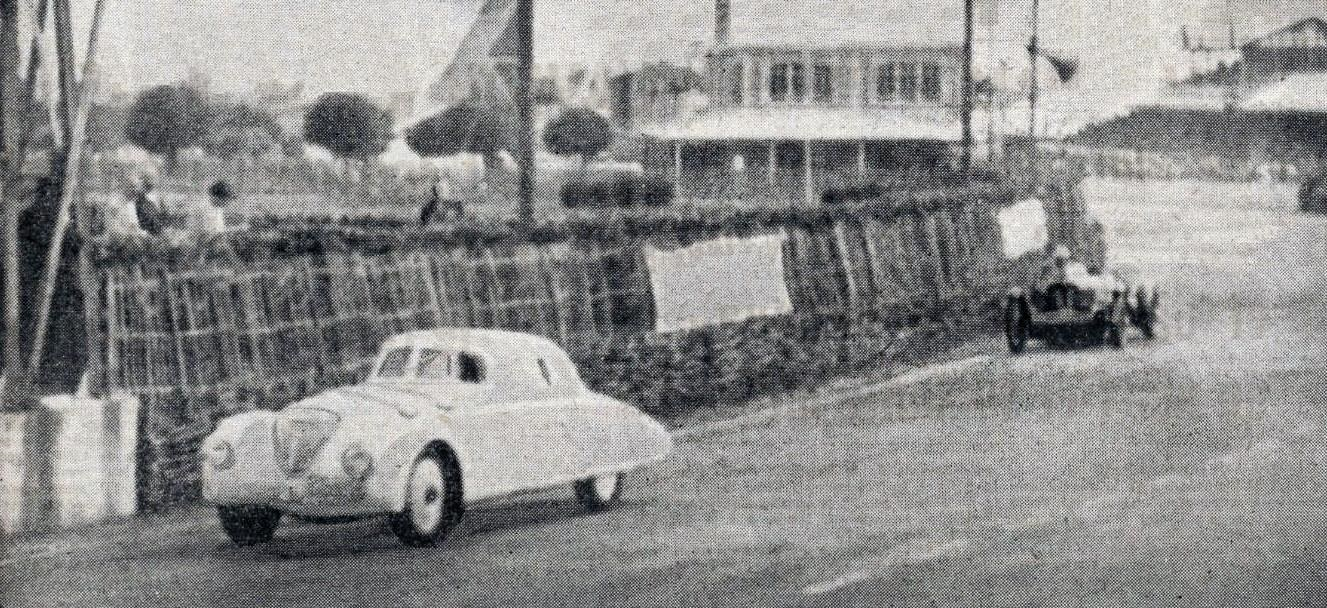
The Sauerwein/Orssich Adler at the 1937 Le Mans 24 Hours

Sauerwein was a cork manufacturer from Mainz, who started racing in 1930 in sportscar racing with a Bugatti Type 43. His successes with that led to the Adler team recruiting him as a works driver, and he won the 1934 Coupe des Glaciers for the marque, as well as coming third in the 1937 Coupe des Alpes.

When Adler entered the 24 Hours of Le Mans for the first time in 1936, Sauerwein was teamed up with Graf Petar Orssich as co-driver, but the race was cancelled; the duo however took part in the 24 Hours of Spa that year, and won their class, leading an Adler 1–2–3 in class (and 7–8–9 overall). At their belated Le Mans debut in 1937, the pair finished 6th, and won their class. They were kept together for the 1938 race, and finished 6th again. Although they only finished 2nd in class, the pair won the Index of Performance, beating team-mates Otto Löhr and Paul von Guilleaume, who had a 1.5 litre Adler, by 2 laps on the Index and 7 laps overall, and the Coupe Biennale.

Sauerwein resumed racing after the Second World War, in small sportscar races or rallies, driving Porsche or Opel. He was entered for the 1951 24 Hours of Le Mans in a Porsche 356, as the only German driver to take part, but he crashed in practice, and the car could not be repaired for the race. He did however make up for this by finishing 2nd in a 356 in the Alpine Rally the next year, only beaten by another Porsche.

== Death ==
For the 1956 Taunus Rally, Sauerwein entered in a BMW, but he suffered injuries in a crash which proved fatal.

== Le Mans results ==
Year	Team	Co-Drivers	Car	Class	Laps	Pos.	Class Pos.
1937	(Germany) Adlerwerke	(Federal State of Austria) Petar Graf Orssich	Adler Supertrumpf Rennlimousine	2.0	205	6th	1st
1938	(Germany) Adlerwerke	(Austria within Nazi Germany) Petar Graf Orssich	Adler Supertrumpf Rennlimousine	2.0	215	6th	2nd
1951	(Germany) Porsche AG	(France) Robert Brunet	Porsche 356	1.1	n/a	DNS	DNS
