= 1938 24 Hours of Le Mans =

15th 24 Hours of Le Mans endurance race

Previous: 1937	Next: 1939
Index: Races | Winners

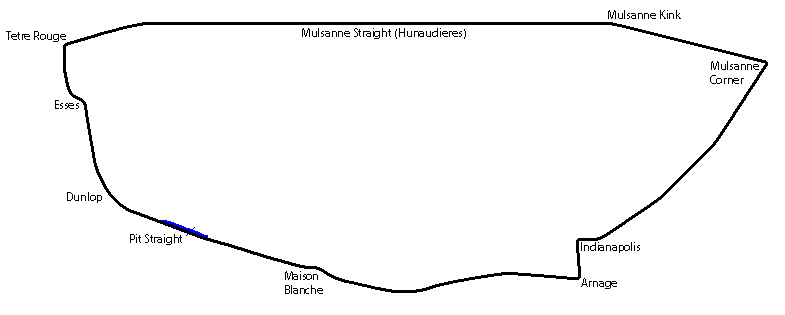
Le Mans in 1938

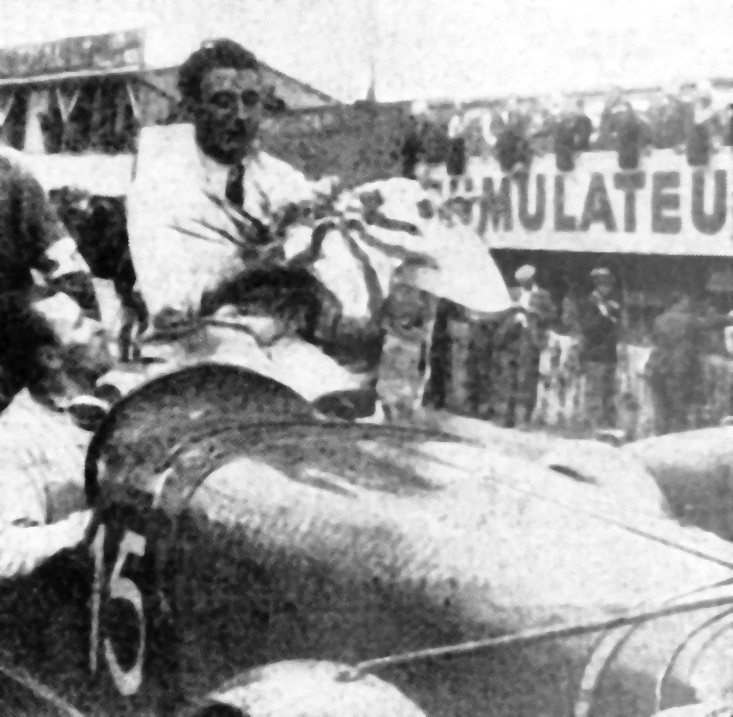
Chaboud and Trémoulet, 1938 race-winners

The 1938 24 Hours of Le Mans was the 15th Grand Prix of Endurance. It took place at the Circuit de la Sarthe on 18 and 19 June 1938. The race was won by Frenchmen Eugène Chaboud and Jean Trémoulet in their privately-entered Delahaye 135 CS, in what was an ordeal of endurance with only 15 of the 42 starters reaching the finish.

The race had started as a contest between the 4.5-litre Delahayes and Talbots (built to the French GP formula) and a streamlined Alfa Romeo 3-litre coupé, all driven by France's top drivers. Going into the evening, two-time winner Raymond Sommer and his Italian co-driver Clemente Biondetti steadily built a commanding lead in the Alfa Romeo as their rivals fell by the wayside. They led right through the night, and by dawn had a 6-lap lead, with half the field already out of the race. Then at 12.45 p.m., Sommer had a front-tyre burst while he was at high speed on the long Hunaudières straight. He managed to get the car back to the pits, but the flailing rubber had damaged the bodywork, suspension and oil lines and despite repairs, came to a halt back out on the track. The lead fell to the Delahaye of Chaboud and Trémoulet who had been battling a troublesome gearbox most of the race, driving for over 20 hours only in top gear. However, they continued on their careful driving to win by two laps from another Delahaye with a standard Talbot saloon in third.

In the smaller classes, Amédée Gordini and José Scaron had amazed the crowd with the pace of their 1100cc SIMCA, running just outside the top-10 in the first half of the race, ahead of most of the bigger 2- and 1.5-litre cars. However, their engine seized approaching midday, that allowed the German Adler cars to come through and take a 1-2 result in the Biennial Cup. A consolation for Gordini was that one of his 570cc SIMCA Cinqs, the smallest cars in the field, convincingly won the Index of Performance prize.

== Regulations and Organisation ==
This year, the AIACR revised its Grand Prix regulations to be for 3.0-litre supercharged engines, or 4.5-litre normally-aspirated, and an updated scale of minimum weight based on engine-size. They also gave provision for 2-seater sports cars to compete. The ACO further penalised supercharged cars lifting the engine-equivalency from x1.6 to x1.65 (achieving their desired effect as only 3 such cars entered).

Once again, the target distances were modified upward, adding about half-dozen laps to the medium and large-engine classes, while the 750cc class was slightly reduced. Shell was the fuel supplier and four options were supplied: its standard petrol, “Super Shell” premium, 100% benzole and its ternary blend of the regular with benzole and ethanol. Most of the circuit was resurfaced before the race, and the track widened from the Arnage corner, through the Maison Blanche complex (site of the mass accident the previous year) to the pit straight. Circles, with the car-numbers in them, were painted on the pit-straight opposite the starting points to hold over-eager drivers from jumping the flagfall. As usual, a range of dance bands, entertainments and food outlets were set up to serve the spectators giving the track a very festive midsummer atmosphere. New grandstands had been completed, as well as a dedicated tower for the timing officials.

Engine size	1937 Minimum distance	1938 Minimum distance	Average speed	Equivalent laps
6000cc+	2,679 km (1,665 mi)	2,800 km (1,700 mi)	115.4 km/h (71.7 mph)	205.2 laps
5000cc	2,601 km (1,616 mi)	2,727 km (1,694 mi)	113.6 km/h (70.6 mph)	202.1 laps
4000cc	2,552 km (1,586 mi)	2,667 km (1,657 mi)	111.1 km/h (69.0 mph)	197.7 laps
3000cc	2,474 km (1,537 mi)	2,571 km (1,598 mi)	107.1 km/h (66.5 mph)	190.6 laps
2000cc	2,331 km (1,448 mi)	2,400 km (1,500 mi)	100.0 km/h (62.1 mph)	177.9 laps
1500cc	2,203 km (1,369 mi)	2,250 km (1,400 mi)	93.8 km/h (58.3 mph)	166.8 laps
1100cc	2,041 km (1,268 mi)	2,062 km (1,281 mi)	85.9 km/h (53.4 mph)	152.8 laps
750cc	1,808 km (1,123 mi)	1,800 km (1,100 mi)	75.0 km/h (46.6 mph)	133.4 laps

== Entries ==
The Bugatti works team rested on its laurels this year and for the first time this decade there would be no Bugattis at Le Mans. Yet a strong entry list was received led by big, works-supported teams from Delahaye and Talbot built to the French sports-car Grand Prix regulations. Their main competition would come from Raymond Sommer's stylish Alfa Romeo coupé. Factory-supported entries also came in the smaller classes, from Adler, Peugeot and Fiat-SIMCA. After a record British turnout the previous year, there were only six cars entered from the UK and once again the French dominated the small-engine entry-list. From the 17 finishers in the 1937 race, there were a dozen cars eligible for the Coupe Biennial and, unusually, it included all the entries in the 2.0-litre class. And the impact of the tightening ACO rules was that there were only two supercharged entries this year (both being Alfa Romeos).

Category	Entries	Classes
Large-sized engines	19 / 15	over 3-litre
Medium-sized engines	7 / 7	1.5 to 3-litre
Small-sized engines	24 / 20	up to 1.5-litre
Total entrants	50 / 42	

- Note: The first number is the total entries, the second the number who started. Using the equivalent engine-size, with supercharged engines having the new x1.65 conversion factor

=== Over 2-litre entries ===
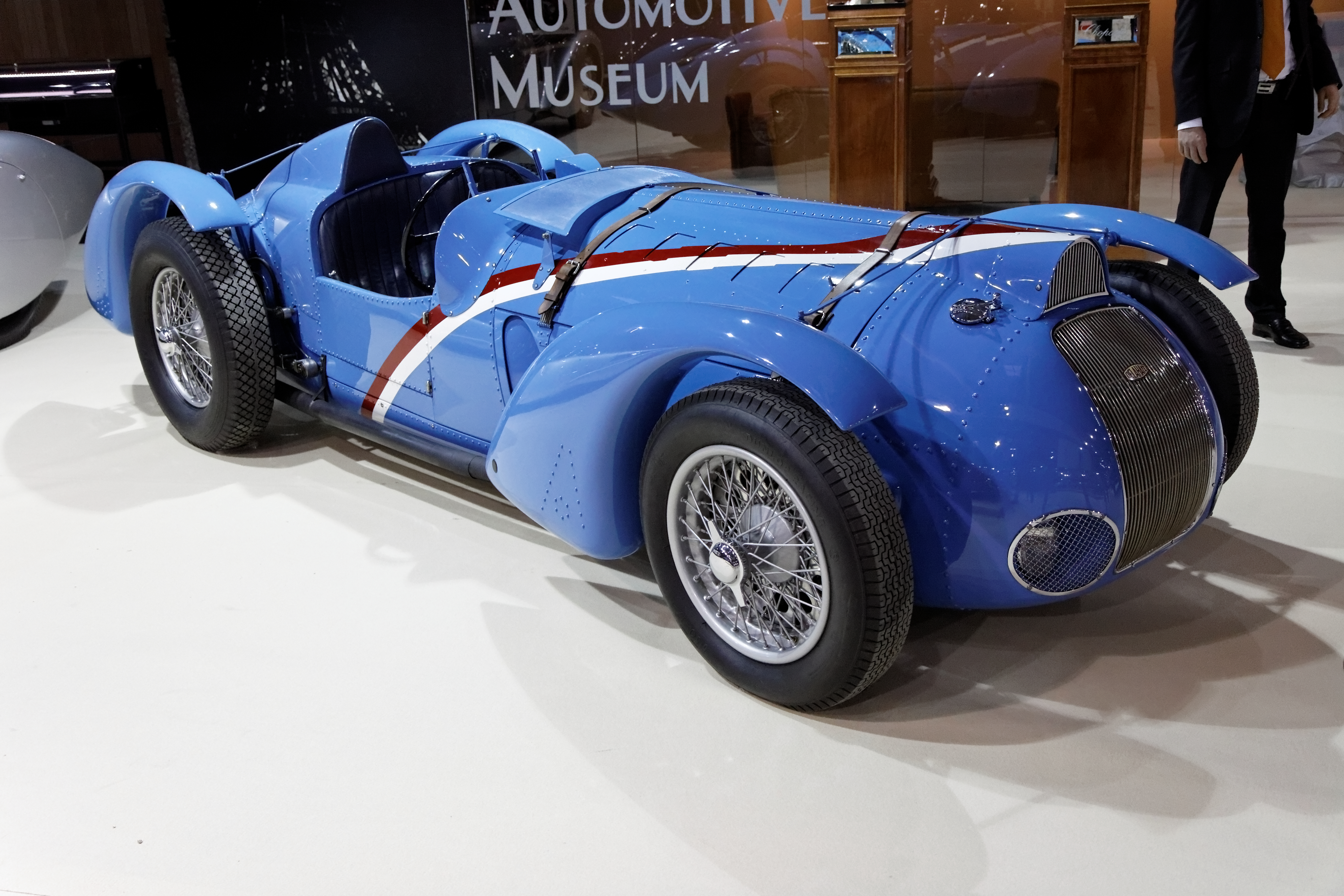
Delahaye 145

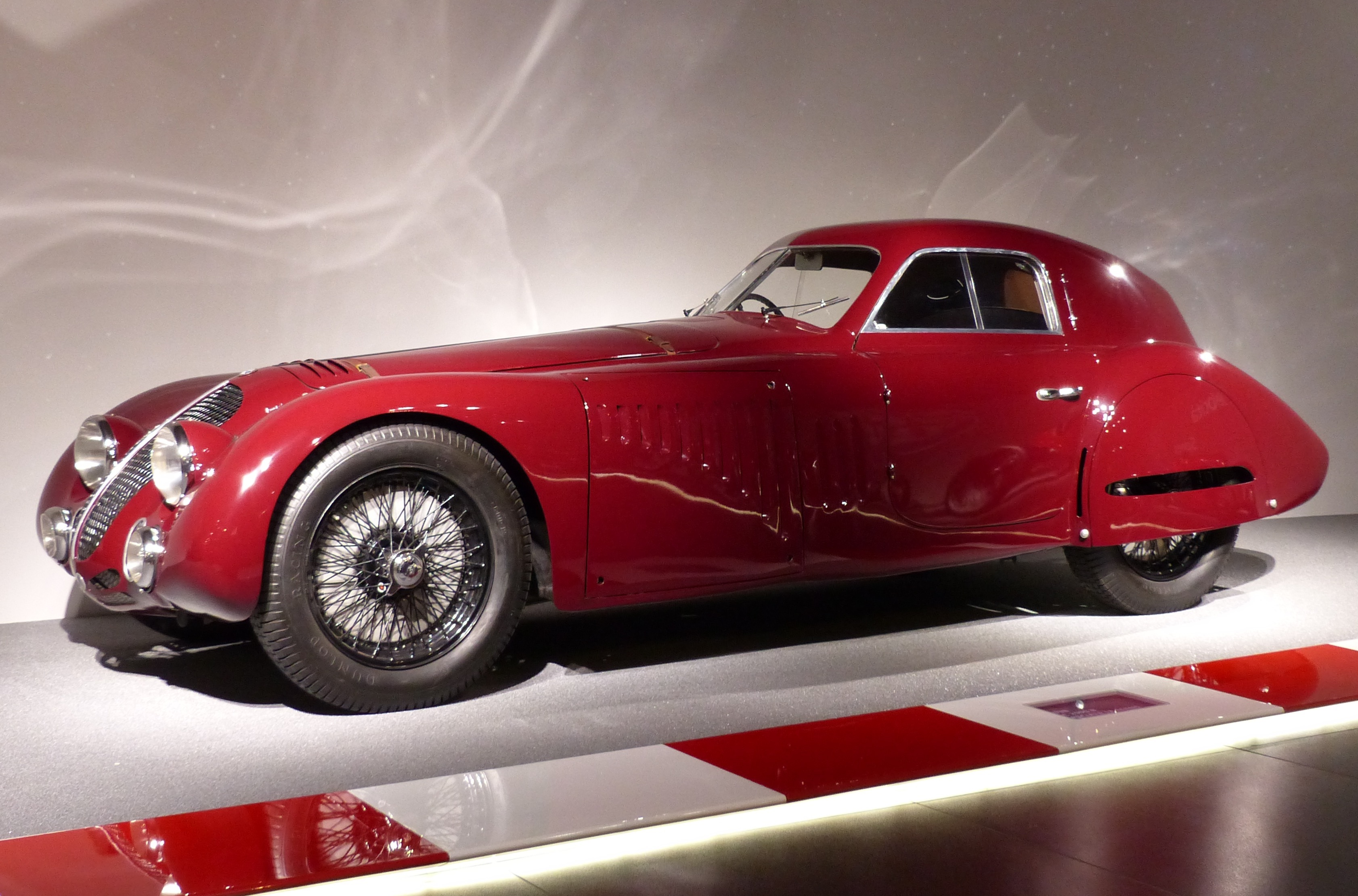
Alfa Romeo 8C 2900B Berlinetta

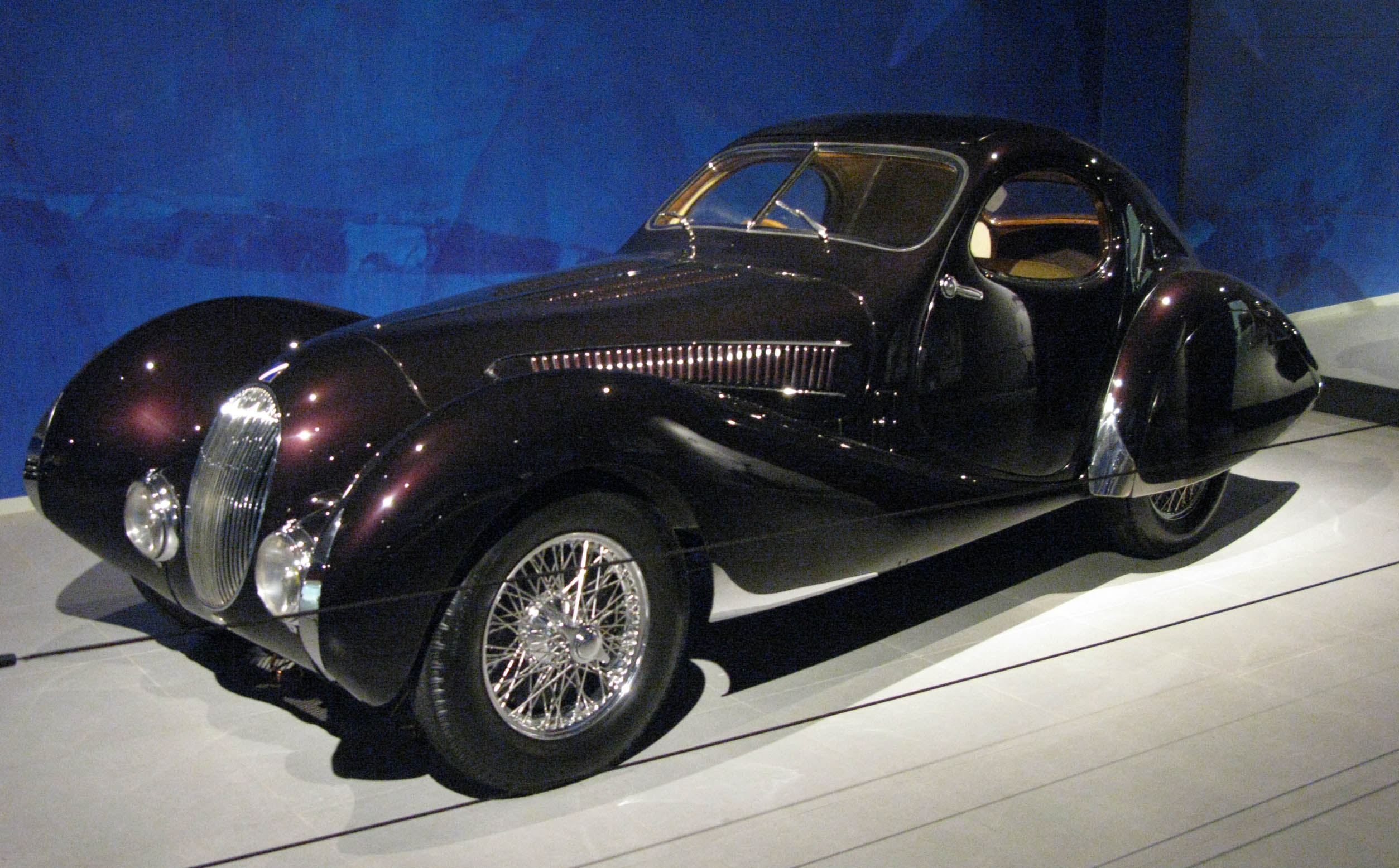
Talbot-Lago T150 SS Coupé

In the absence of the Bugatti team, the biggest cars in the field were the 4.5-litre Delahayes. The new Delahaye 145 had been developed for the French GP regulations. The V12 engine ran off three camshafts driving the two valves per cylinder. It generated 245 bhp through a 4-speed gearbox. The two-seater chassis was dual-purpose for both grand prix and endurance racing. René Dreyfus had caused a sensation when he beat Rudolf Caracciola in the new Mercedes-Benz W154 in the first race of the new 4.5-litre formula, at Pau. Two were entered for the Écurie Bleue team of Laury and Lucy Schell with a strong driver line-up. Louis Chiron was brought in, to partner Dreyfus and veteran Albert Divo to race with Gianfranco Comotti. The team was supported by a half-dozen private entrants running the 135 Compétition with its 3.6-litre straight-6 engine. Joseph Paul had finished second in 1937 with Marcel Mongin and returned for the Coupe Bienniale entry. After an accident at Brooklands, Paul had his arm in plaster, so this year Robert Mazaud was brought in as Mongin's co-driver. Mazaud was having a strong opening season racing his own Delahaye having just finished second in the Belgian Grand Prix des Frontières before Le Mans. Eugène Chaboud had bought a new car for this race and once again raced with Jean Trémoulet. Former boxer Louis Villeneuve and Daniel Porthault both entered their cars and the other one was a less powerful 135 C for two of France’s most successful motorcyclists: Georges Monnaret and Roger Loyer. The sixth car, of Englishman John Snow, did not arrive.

The Alfa Romeo 8C had dominated the race in the 1930s. Originally starting with a 2.3-litre 8-cylinder engine, it had gradually been uprated, and the 2.9-litre version had won the Mille Miglia in 1936 and 1937. The company now looked to enhance its reputation further with the 8C-2900B - a prestigious convertible styled by Carrozzeria Touring for sale. The twin-supercharged DOHC 2.9-litre engine was based on that from the grand prix car detuned to put out 225 bhp. On New Year's Day, chairman Ugo Gobbato reorganised and rebranded the Scuderia Ferrari as the Alfa Corse works team, still under the leadership of Enzo Ferrari. A full works effort running four of the 8C-2900B brought success again at the Mille Miglia in April against an international field including Delahaye and Talbot. Alfa Corse would not be at Le Mans, but a sleek coupé model was prepared for top French privateer, and two-time winner, Raymond Sommer. Built by Touring's patented Superleggera (“super-light”) method of thin tubes forming the structure and wrapped in thin aluminium panels with integral wheel fenders and a sloping rear cockpit. The streamlined shape meant the car could reach 220 km/h (135 mph) as well as helping to give better fuel efficiency. Alfa sent works driver Clemente Biondetti (the Mille Miglia winner) as a co-driver, along with an expert pit-crew. Frenchman Marcel Horvilleur brought his new purchase, an older Alfa 8C Monza. This chassis had finished second in the 1933 Mille Miglia driven by Franco Cortese. The engine had been since upgraded with a bigger 2.7-litre supercharged engine.

The introduction of the Talbot T150 Course had been underwhelming the previous year. A bigger effort was made this year, led by Le Mans 2-time winner Luigi Chinetti running virtually a works team under his own name. He brought four cars to the circuit. Two of them were the open-top T150 C, with Chinetti’s car equipped with the latest 4.5-litre Grand Prix engine. With his co-driver being rising French star Philippe Étancelin, they were a very strong combination. The second car was driven by works drivers René Le Bègue and René Carrière (who had raced it to fifth earlier in the year at the Mille Miglia). They also entered two 4-litre Super Sports coupés, with elegant styling by the Parisian coachbuilding company Figoni et Falaschi. Their owners raced them with Chinetti’s crew: Jean Prenant had 53-year-old Talbot test-driver André Morel. Louis Rosier owned the other, a 32-year-old who ran a trucking-company. He had previously raced Alfa Romeos in hill-climb events, but this was his racing debut. The Chinetti team also supported two privateer entries. Le Bègue had sold his own T150C to all-round sportsman Pierre Bouillin. Now 33-years old, he had retired from playing tennis and ice hockey and had started racing a Bugatti in 1937, under the pseudonym “Levegh” – that his uncle has also used when racing at the turn of the century. On his behalf the car was entered and co-driven by the experienced Jean Trévoux. The other car had been crashed in the 1937 race and repaired, then on-sold to Norbert-Jean Mahé. He engaged two British drivers, Freddie Clifford and Thomas Alastair Sutherland Ogilvy (T.A.S.O.) Mathieson.

Once again, the 3-litre class had only two entries – both French cars. Slot-machine magnate Louis Gérard had debuted last year, and despite having never raced before, came away with the class victory and an impressive 4th overall in his Delage D6-70 coupé. He subsequently sold the heavy bodywork to purchase a new, open-top replacement from Figoni et Falaschi to mount onto the D6-70 chassis, weighing almost 200 kg less. He entered it again with the Société R.V. and once again got team co-owner, Jacques de Valence de Minardière, to drive with him. The other entry was an Amilcar Pégase. The company had previously had much success in voiturette racing in the late 1920s, but reflecting the hard times, it was now co-owned by Hotchkiss, and the Pégase was the last model left in production. To save costs it had been fitted with a Delahaye 2.0-litre, but now for racing three were prepared with a new in-house engine, bored out to 2490cc with twin carburettors. Putting out 75 bhp, it could get up to 160 km/h (100 mph). One of the cars was owned by ‘’Madame’’ Fernande Roux, a good friend of Amilcar lead engineer Maurice Mestivier. Roux used it for rallying and entered the car for Le Mans with fellow female rally driver, Germaine Rouault as co-driver.

=== 1.1- to 2-litre entries ===
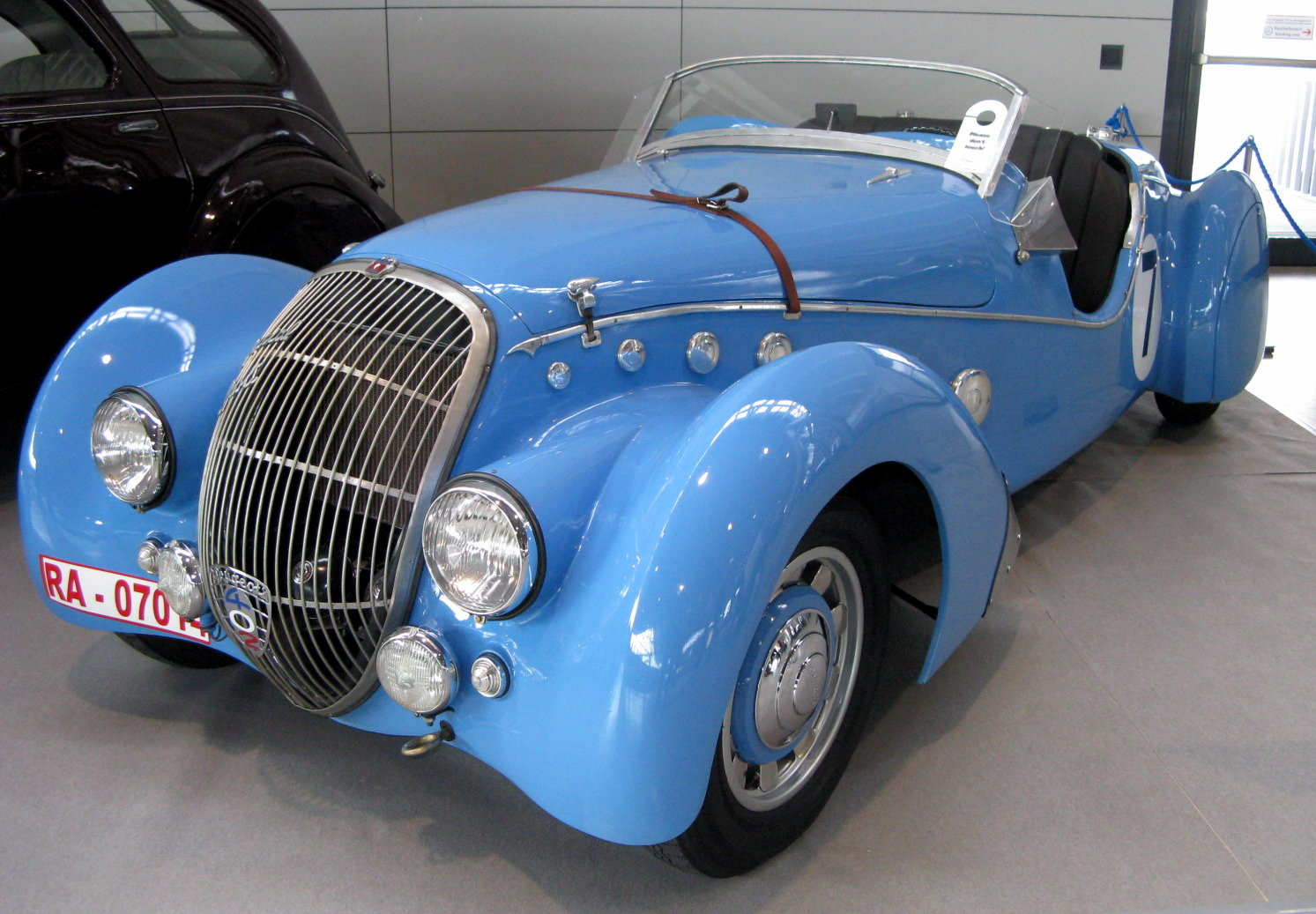
Peugeot 402 Darl’mat Spéciale

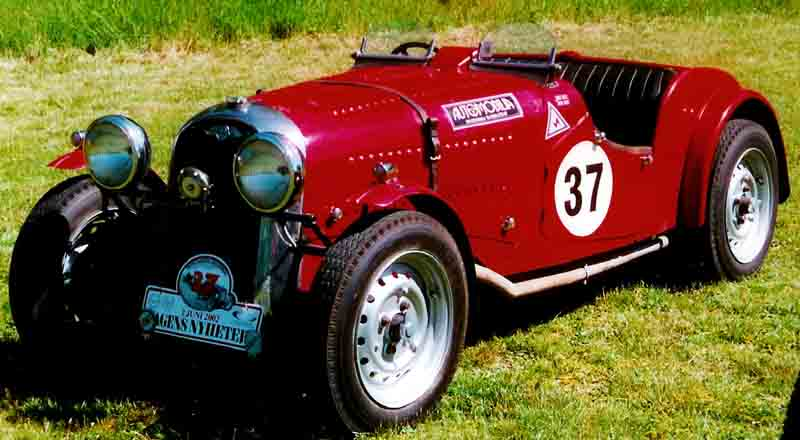
Morgan 4/4

With two entries to the Coupe Bienniale from 1937, Adler returned to defend their 2-litre class-win. However, this time they contested both the 2-litre and 1.5-litre classes. Peter, Graf Orssich and Rudolph Sauerwein were back in their streamlined Super Trumpf Rennlimousine. The side-valve 1980cc engine could reach 170 km/h (105 mph). It was smaller than that of the Peugeot, their prime competition, that cost them around 12 seconds a lap but also meant their Index target was 6 laps lower which is what both teams were (realistically) racing for. Their other works drivers, Paul von Guilleaume and Otto Löhr, this year raced the smaller 1.5-litre Trumpf car that had been loaned to Anne-Cécile Rose-Itier.

Émile Darl’mat had run three of his modified Peugeot 302 tourers at the last Le Mans and they all qualified for the Coupe Bienniale. This year, he and the Carrosserie Pourtout looked at the new model of the Peugeot 402, the ‘’Légère Berline’’ convertible. Its 2.0-litre overhead valve engine produced 87 bhp. Three of the Darl’Mat Spéciales were prepared with Peugeot support and their works drivers. The same six drivers from 1937 returned, albeit changed into different combinations: Peugeot competition manager Charles de Cortanze was with Contet, veteran Louis Rigal with Pujol and Serre/Portault had the third car.

Robert Hichens had won the 2.0-litre class in his Aston Martin Speed and returned to defend his title, with his co-driver Mort Morris-Goodall again. The Écurie Eudel of Guy Lapchin had raced their ex-works Riley Sprites with their Paulin streamlined bodyshell during the year with limited success, including leading the Bol d’Or until retiring. Only one car arrived, with team drivers Caron and Forestier, who was a survivor of the terrible Maison Blanche crash the year before. Forestier’s own ex-works car had been purchased by Pierre Ferry and came to Le Mans, refitted with the lighter standard shell.

After a first entry the previous year and successfully finishing, the small HRG company had seen an increase in orders. Plans were made to release a new model, and to upgrade the Meadows engine to a twin-cam Singer engine. Archie Scott, who had driven the HRG last year, ordered one but in the end was unable to race because of his impending wedding. Peter Clark, another HRG racer, sent his car to the factory to upgrade it with the latest components as well as installing a lengthened, pointed tail. His aim was to take it to Le Mans, with his team called the Écurie Lapin Blanc (‘White Rabbit’). HRG factory engineer, Marcus Chambers, modified the engine and also signed up as co-driver. Testing was done at Brooklands, but the new engine blew up a fortnight before the race. Another engine was sourced by a fellow HRG-owner but could not be tested before the practice sessions, where it was found its maximum speed was only 130 km/h (80 mph). Alfred Gough had made engines for Frazer Nash, but their unreliability led the company to replace them with Meadows engines. Gough left to start his own car company in 1937 – Atalanta Motors – with wealthy, young racing friends Peter Whitehead and Dennis Poore. His debut model was built around his innovative SOHC engine, with three valves and two sparkplugs per cylinder. Two versions were available – either 1996cc or 1496cc. The latter pushed out 78 bhp through a 3-speed gearbox, and it was one of those cars that was entered. With a two-seat open-top body, it had fully independent suspension and hydraulic brakes. The small new company could not meet production requirements for the British RAC criteria, but the ACO was more lenient. The drivers were majority shareholder Neil Watson, along with Charles Morrison.

=== up to 1.1-litre entries ===
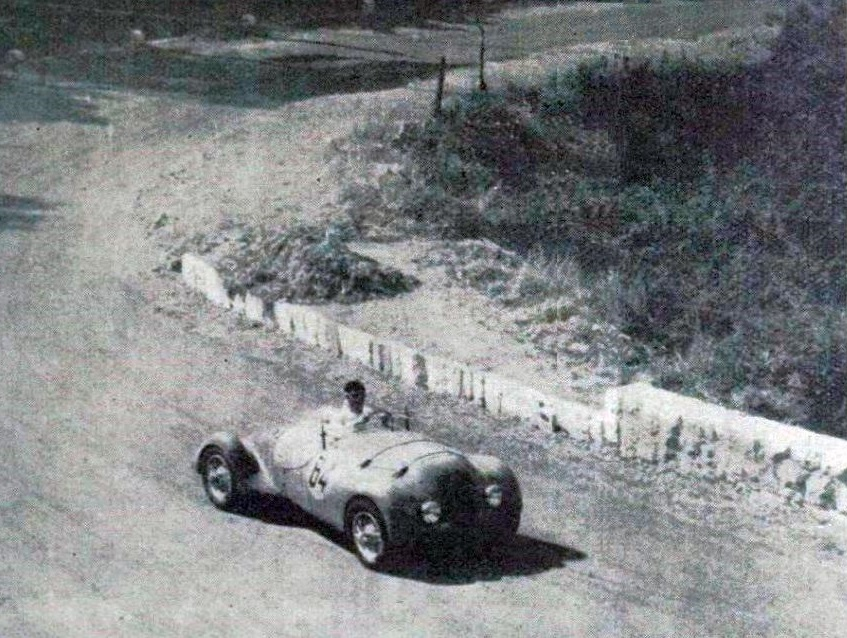
Amédée Gordini in his SIMCA 8 in the Paris-Nice race

The SIMCA company had now discarded the “Fiat” byname and this year the company released its new model, the Simca 8 – which was a rebadge of the Fiat 508C. It had a 1089cc overhead-valve engine and was fitted with independent front suspension. It also got the special treatment at the workshop of Amédée Gordini and his bodywork team, led by Gabriel Beausser. The engines and transmissions were overhauled and tuned to put out 60 bhp, while the chassis was strengthened and covered with a curved duralumin copper-aluminium alloy bodyshell. Just a fortnight earlier, Gordini had won the Bol d’Or 24-hour race in his new SIMCA 8, and the marque took a 1-2-3-4 in the 1100cc class and 1-2-3 in the 750cc class, so confidence was high. Gordini assembled a works-supported team with six cars, with a pair each of the ‘’Huit’’, ‘’Six’’ and ‘’Cinq’’. Gordini himself raced the leading Huit with voiturette driver José Scaron (taking the team’s Coupe entry), with the other was driven by Jean Viale (their 750cc class-winner in 1937). The tiny 568cc SIMCA 5 streamliner that had won its class had been setting records at Montlhéry and returned to Le Mans, driven by Aimé/Plantivaux along with a second entry. Privateer Just-Émile Vernet, who had won the 1100cc class in 1937, bought several chassis from Gordini and this year entered three SIMCA 8s, two with special bodies and with one of those, Vernet again raced with Suzanne Largeot. The other SIMCA privateer was Victor Camérano, who raced a regular SIMCA Huit saloon, fitted with a Gordini-tuned engine.

Singer had won the 1100cc class in 1934 and 1935 when sizeable fleets of the Singer Nine were entered. However, this year, with no Coupe interest, there were only two entries – both from two pairs of brothers. Former works team manager, Stan Barnes, had set up Team Autosports in 1937 with his brother Donald as lead driver. This year Don had the racing journalist and driver Tommy Wisdom as his co-driver. French privateer Jacques Savoye also returned with his modified car, this time partnered by his brother Pierre. Two MGs were entered this year, both PB Midgets. Dorothy Stanley-Turner had the experienced Elsie ‘Bill’ Wisdom with her. The second car was that of Belgian Claude Bonneau. After it being damaged in a road accident, he put a new, streamlined body kit on the chassis. His co-driver was experienced female racer, Anne-Cécile Rose-Itier.

Morgan was a well-established British company that for 25 years had built three-wheel cyclecars with wooden chassis. Their first 4-wheeled car was released in 1936. The Morgan 4/4 (referring to 4 wheels, 4 cylinders) had either a 1122cc or 1098cc Coventry Climax engine, putting out just over 30 bhp. Prudence Fawcett had travelled to the race in 1937 as a spectator and was inspired with the six female participants and resolved to enter herself. Along with friend Lance Prideaux-Brune, she ran an Alfa Romeo dealership in London and gained her competition license in January. Prideaux-Brune convinced H. F. S. Morgan that it would be good PR for the company to have Prudence race one of his cars at Le Mans, and a car was loaned to them to enter the 1.1-litre class.

== Practice and Pre-Race ==
En route to Le Mans, Stanley-Turner came down with a severe case of diphtheria infection and would not be able to race her MG. Arthur Dobson, the well-known ERA works driver, was brought in as a last-minute substitute for his Le Mans debut. Roger Labric had one of his Bugatti Type 57S “tanks” running during the practice, however the car was withdrawn, likely as there was no interest for works support. The new Atalanta slid off the track making the mechanics repair the rear corner. Practice times had shown, as expected, that the fastest cars were Sommer’s Alfa Romeo and the Delahaye 145s and the Talbot T150s. The Porthault Delahaye almost missed the start when it needed a last-minute repair to a leaking fuel-tank.

== Race ==
=== Start ===
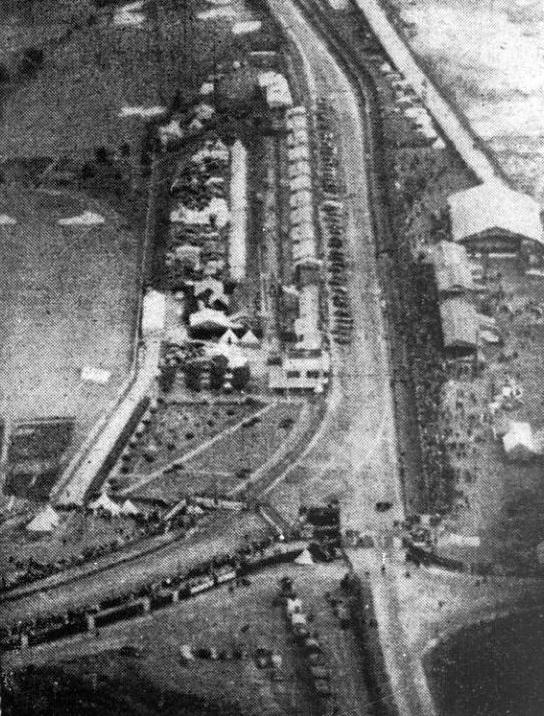
Overherad view of the pit straight and grandstands

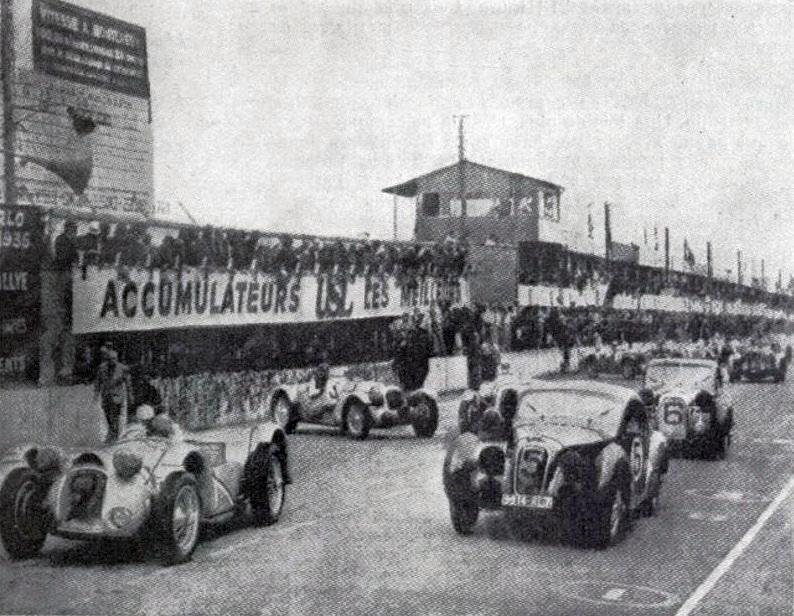
Start of the race

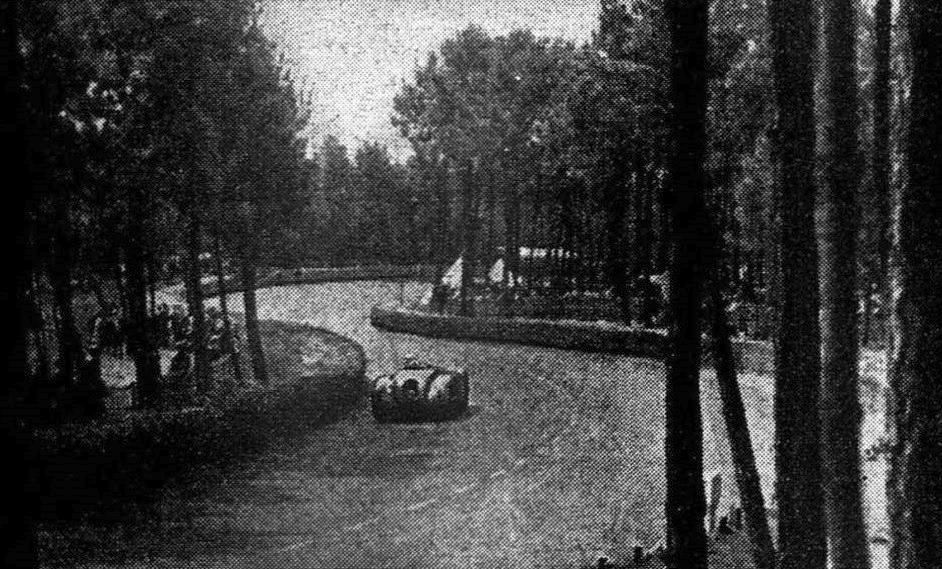
The Esses leading to Tertre Rouge

On a hot, humid Saturday, a large crowd came out from the city filling the grandstands. Sommer, a crowd favourite, stood at the line with a straw hat to shade himself. At precisely 4 p.m., race director Charles Faroux waved the national flag. Quickest away was Giraud-Cabantous in his Delahaye but, by dint of starting furthest along the road, the first under the bridge were Dreyfus and Comotti in the #1 and #2 Delahayes. Down the Hunaudières Straight for the first time, it was Sommer in the streamlined Alfa that raced past the cars ahead to get up to third. However, it was not a smooth start for everyone: Ferry’s Riley managed to sputter off at the back of the field, but Clifford only got his recalcitrant Talbot moving as the leaders were finishing their first lap. Sommer (still wearing his straw hat in the car) passed Divo on the next lap and hounded Dreyfus before diving under him on braking at Arnage on lap 3 to take the lead. Dreyfus, in turn, returned the favour on the sixth lap, blasting past the Alfa with raw speed going down the long back straight, getting onto the grass at 240 km/h (150 mph).

But the torrid pace was having an effect and Comotti pitted the next lap with gearbox issues. Divo jumped in and roared off, only to pit and retire the next lap. Meanwhile Étancelin, now up to speed, picked off Dreyfus then Sommer, to get to the front on lap 10. For the next 20 minutes, he and Sommer duelled for the lead, swapping it back and forth. Dreyfus, however, had pitted his Delahaye with an overheating engine and only managed a couple more laps before retiring with no oil pressure – both of the big Delahayes were now out. Further back, Gordini was amazing everyone with the turn of speed of his nimble, little SIMCA at the expense of much bigger cars. By the 10th lap, he was running 14th overall and now getting amongst the 3-litre cars. Viale, in the sister car, was close behind and together they would stay ahead of the 1.5-litre cars into the evening. One of the Darl’mat Peugeots had broken its gearbox after 6 laps, a second would fail in the second hour. After his slow start, Ferry was now leading the 1.5-litre class although the other Riley, of Forestier, was stopping every 5 laps or so. The Atalanta retired on lap 4 after shearing a pin in the driveshaft, damaged in the practice accident – thus ending one of the shortest durations for a marque at Le Mans.

At the end of the first hour, it was Sommer with the narrowest of leads over Étancelin, with Carrière third in the sister Talbot. With a 24-lap minimum distance mandated between fuel stops, the first top-ups for gas and regular driver changes didn’t happen until well into the third hour. By now, the frenetic pace at the start had settled down to a more sustainable speed. Newcomer Mazaud was driving the best-performing of the Delahayes in the early part of the race, running in the top-6. Just before 9 p.m., he was just into his second stint when smoke erupted from the engine while going through the Esses. Stopping, he opened the bonnet and a fire erupted. With no fire extinguishers nearby, the spectators threw dirt onto the engine to dowse the flames, but the car would go no further. Trémoulet was also struggling with his Delahaye. Unable to change down at Arnage, the slowest corner of the track, he pulled over. Finding nothing amiss he carried on, mostly in top gear. This, in fact, proved extremely fuel-efficient and he only pitted after an unprecedented 40 laps.

=== Night ===
At 10 p.m., after 6 hours, the red Alfa had a 2-lap lead over a fleet of chasing blue cars – three Talbots, a Delahaye and another Talbot. As night fell though, the Chinetti/Étancelin Talbot running in second started sounding rough and soon retired with terminal engine problems. Into the night, Sommer and Biondetti continued their relentless charge. Gordini, likewise, had a large lead in the Index competition, running at a record pace. By midnight, there had been a dozen retirements. The Alfa drivers still had a lap’s lead over the Talbots of Carrière/Le Bègue and Trévoux/”Levegh”, with the best Delahaye now being Chaboud/Trémoulet in fourth. Gordini continued to lead all the small cars, now 3 laps ahead of the 1.5-litre leader – the Adler saloon of Löhr/von Guilleaume. The middle of the race, through the night, had the reputation as the car-breaker and a number fell by the wayside: Soon after midnight, the Le Bègue/Carrière Talbot, running 2nd, was forced out when its gearbox broke. Rosier’s Talbot coupé had been running well, in the top-10, but was stopped by engine failure. Likewise, the Delage and older Alfa also retired before midnight, the latter in a big cloud of steam from the radiator. The women in the Amilcar now had the class to themselves but their engine broke just before 4 a.m.

At that midway point, the Alfa was still dominating, having done 128 laps. Its only issue was having to endure a single working headlamp. They were now 5 laps ahead of the privateer Talbot of Trévoux (123), with the similar Mathieson car in third (120). The Chaboud/Trémoulet Delahaye was now 10 laps back and running only in top gear, except when leaving the pits. However, they were still ahead of the similar cars of Serraud (116) and Villeneuve (114). Seventh was Morel’s Talbot (109) then came the Darl’mat Peugeot of de Cortanze (108) leading the 2-litre class by three laps over the Adler, with its smaller brother (105) leading the 1.5-litre class and filling out the top-10. The Gordini SIMCA had just spent half an hour in the pits fixing suspension issues, but still had the 1100cc lead. Only 25 cars were still running. The Aston Martin had been racing with a dodgy cylinder through the night, and then lost a lot of time in the pits getting its exhaust system fixed, losing touch with the Adler and Darl’mat.

=== Morning ===
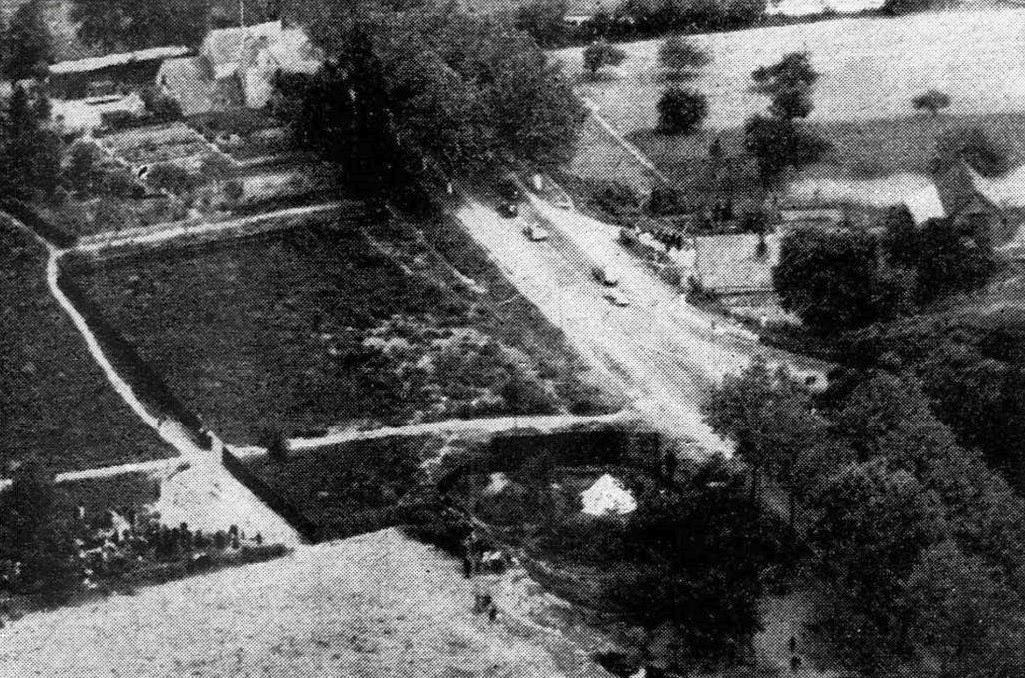
Overhead view of cars racing on the Hunaudières straight

As dawn gave way to breakfast, the field had been whittled down to almost half. By 7 a.m., the Alfa Romeo had pushed on hard and now had a 6-lap lead on the Trévoux Talbot with the Chaboud Delahaye now up to third when the Mathieson Talbot had an extended stop. Löhr’s Adler had risen to tenth with the Gordini SIMCA in 12th, still well ahead on the Index (and Biennale) Cup. Second on Index was close though, with the extremes of the race-leading Alfa battling with the tiny Simca Cinq of Aimé and Plantivaux.

Then approaching 8 a.m., the race abruptly changed and within a half hour both the Talbots were out. The Trévoux car had a blown head gasket that caused an engine fire. Not long after, Mathieson was racing toward Maison Blanche when he was engulfed by smoke. Getting through the corner, he pulled over and grabbed his onboard extinguisher, however he was unable to save the car. It was Chabout/Trémoulet, still struggling with their gearbox, who benefitted. Moving up to second, they were 10 laps behind the Alfa Romeo. They were the first of three Delahayes chasing the Alfa. Third were Serraud/Cabantous, running like clockwork while fourth-placed Villeneuve/Biolay was starting to show engine issues. Behind them, still driving their conservative, metronomic pace was Prenant’s Talbot coupé.

In the medium-classes, the 2-litre Adler had been picking up its pace to press the Peugeot four laps ahead. When the Aston Martin, now well back, retired late in the morning it became a two-horse race. The second Adler was running smoothly, with a lock on the 1.5-litre class. The Riley of Ferry/Noireaux had been keeping within 2 laps of the Adler though the night and running 12th overall until its gearbox packed up shortly before 8 a.m. So the Adler’s only remaining competition was the increasingly rough-sounding HRG, 20 laps back. Approaching midday, the mighty run of Gordini’s SIMCA came to an end when Scaron stopped out on-track because of a ruptured oil-pipe that had seized the engine. The other Huit had already retired at dawn, when it was planted into the sandbank at Mulsanne. Despite a convenient shovel appearing, the loss of oil spelt the end of the engine. The demise of the SIMCA now left the Adlers running 1-2 in the Biennale competition and the Savoye brothers leading the 1100cc class. By midday, there were only 17 cars left running.

=== Finish and post-race ===
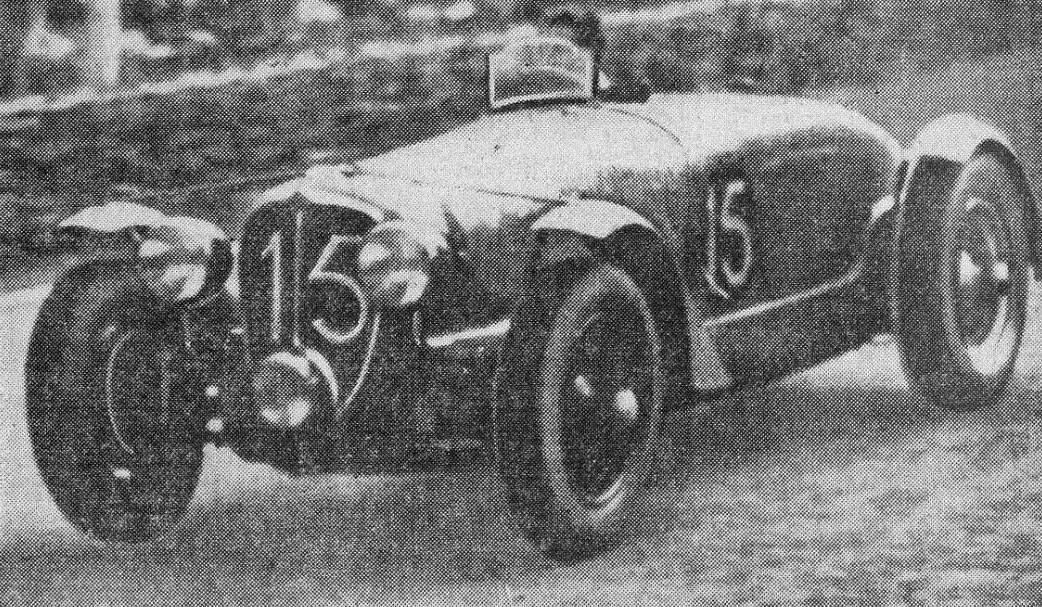
Winning Delahaye of Chaboud & Trémoulet

At lunchtime, there was sudden off-track drama when a spectator tent caught fire, though ultimately without serious effect. Things were looking set for the Alfa team, now running at a comfortable pace. Then at 12.45, without warning, Sommer had his front-right tyre rupture while going full speed down the Hunaudières straight. With expert car control he kept the car on the track and limped back slowly to the pits. The rubber cords had thrashed away at the bodywork and engine mounts. The crew replaced the wheel, hammered out the worst of the damage and Biondetti rejoined the race. But the engine was sounding worse, and pitting again could not resolve the issue. He ground to a halt on the next lap, near the Mulsanne corner. Biondetti resolved to push the car back to the pits. Chabout/Trémoulet were now 12 laps behind (over 100 miles), and it took over an hour for them to overtake the Alfa Romeo. Nursing their gearbox, the held a two-lap lead over the second Delahaye so could not afford to let up too much or risk any engine mishaps. By 3 p.m., Biondetti had reached Arnage. However, for a 40-year-old to push a 1-tonne car another four kilometres was too great a task and, exhausted, he finally admitted defeat. After that, there was little left in the race, as the cars eased off to make the finish. The only interest for the spectators was whether the limping HRG could make its target distance. After running well, albeit a distant second in the 1.5-litre class, it ran into engine-valve issues in the morning. Running on 3 cylinders for the remainder of the race, it managed to reach its target distance with a half-hour to go, and just 4 laps to spare, slipping down to 10th.

Chaboud and Trémoulet retained their lead to take the win in spite of spending most of the race driving in top gear, ahead of Serraud and Giraud-Cabantous. Prenant and Morel's Talbot coupé came in third place, fourteen laps back, holding steady as rivals were retiring from the race. The Darl'mat Peugeot driven by de Cortanze and Contet was fifth place, ahead of two German Adlers. Even though the French car took first place in the 2-litre class, it was the Adler teams that took home the Biennale Coupe award, which is awarded on cumulative results over two years. Due to mechanical breakdowns, only three out of eleven cars entered in the class finished the race The SIMCA Cinqs took the rear positions, one thousand two hundred kilometers back from the winner, but covered more ground than anticipated to claim successive Index awards over the Adlers. Upon completion of the race, director Faroux hailed the car's creator, Amédée Gordini, as a "sorcier" (wizard), a nickname that became his for the rest of his career.

Blue cars finished 1-2-3-4-5 on overall distance, which was an unprecedented dominance for the French marques to date. In contrast, the British did not do well this year, with only two of the seven teams finishing, and well back from the class-winners. Chaboud followed up his win less than a month later by entering the Spa 24-Hours. That race was run in almost constant rain and during the night Trémoulet crashed into a tree, completely wrecking the car. Once again Sommer and Biondetti dominated that race too until put out by transmission issues. After a disappointing Le Mans, Gérard had a far better race at Spa, with the Delage finishing a close second to a works Alfa Romeo.

== Official results ==
=== Finishers ===
Results taken from Quentin Spurring’s book, officially licensed by the ACO
Class Winners are in Bold text.

Pos	Class	No.	Team	Drivers	Chassis	Engine	Tyre	Target distance*	Laps
1	**5.0**	**15**	(France) **E. Chaboud & J. Trémoulet** (private entrant)	(France) **Eugène Chaboud** **(France) Jean Trémoulet**	Delahaye 135 CS	Delahaye 3.6L S6	D	194	235
2	5.0	14	(France) G. Serraud (private entrant)	(France) Gaston Serraud (France) Yves Giraud-Cabantous	Delahaye 135 CS	Delahaye 3.6L S6	D	194	233
3	5.0	5	(France) Jean Prenant (private entrant) (France) Luigi Chinetti	(France) Jean Prenant (France) André Morel	Talbot-Lago T150SS Coupé	Talbot 4.0L S6	D	197	219
4	5.0	10	(France) L. Villeneuve (private entrant)	(France) Louis Villeneuve (France) René Biolay	Delahaye 135 CS	Delahaye 3.6L S6	D	195	218
5	**2.0**	**24**	(France) **Émile Darl'mat**	(France) **Charles de Cortanze** **(France) Marcel Contet**	Peugeot 402 Darl'mat Spéciale Sport	Peugeot 1998cc S4	D	177*	214
6	2.0	28	(Germany) Adlerwerke	(Germany) Petar Graf Orssich (Germany) Rudolph Sauerwein	Adler Trumpf Super Rennlimousine	Adler 1679cc S4	E	171*	211
7	**1.5**	**33**	(Germany) **Adlerwerke**	(Germany) **Otto Löhr** **(Germany) Paul von Guilleaume**	Adler Trumpf Rennlimousine	Adler 1495cc S4	E	166*	204
8	**1.1**	**46**	(France) **J. Savoye** (private entrant)	(France) **Jacques Savoye** **(France) Pierre Savoye**	Singer Nine "Savoye Spéciale"	Singer 974cc S4	D	146	174
9	1.1	42	(France) Just-Émile Vernet	(France) Guy Lapchin (France) Albert Debille	Simca 8 Gordini	Fiat 1088cc.S4	D	152	172
10	1.5	31	(United Kingdom) Écurie Lapin Blanc (United Kingdom) HRG Engineering Company	(United Kingdom) Peter Clark (United Kingdom) Marcus Chambers	HRG Le Mans	Meadows 1499cc S4	D	166	170
11	1.1	48	(France) V. Camérano (private entrant)	(France) Victor Camérano (France) Robert Klempenère	Simca 8	Fiat 1087cc.S4	D	152	166
12	1.1	49	(France) C. Bonneau (private entrant)	(France) Claude Bonneau (France) Anne-Cécile Rose-Itier	MG Midget PB Spéciale	MG 954cc S4	D	145	165
13	1.1	40	(United Kingdom) Miss P.M. Fawcett (private entrant)	(United Kingdom) Prudence Fawcett (United Kingdom) Geoffrey White	Morgan 4/4	Coventry Climax 1098cc S4	D	152	163
14	**750**	**51**	**(France) Écurie Gordini**	(France) **Maurice Aimé** **(France) Charles Plantivaux**	Simca 5 Gordini	Fiat 568cc S4	D	118	151
15	750	52	(France) Écurie Gordini	(France) Albert Leduc (France) Athos Querzola	Simca 5 Gordini	Fiat 568cc S4	D	118	140

=== Did Not Finish ===
Pos	Class	No	Team	Drivers	Chassis	Engine	Tyre	Target distance*	Laps	Reason
DNF	5.0	19	(France) R. Sommer (private entrant)	(France) Raymond Sommer (Italy) Clemente Biondetti	Alfa Romeo 8C 2900B Coupé	Alfa Romeo 3.0L S8 twin-supercharged	D	201	219	engine (22hr)
DNF	5.0	8	(France) N.- J. Mahé (private entrant) (Italy) Luigi Chinetti	(United Kingdom) Maj Frederick "Freddie" Clifford (United Kingdom) T.A.S.O. Mathieson	Talbot-Lago T150C	Talbot 4.0L S6	D	197	159	fire (17hr)
DNF	5.0	7	(France) J. Trévoux (private entrant) (Italy) Luigi Chinetti	(France) Jean Trévoux (France) ”Levegh” (Pierre Bouillin)	Talbot-Lago T150C	Talbot 4.0L S6	D	197	159	engine (16hr)
DNF	2.0	27	(United Kingdom) R. P. Hichens (private entrant)	(United Kingdom) Cdr Robert Hichens (United Kingdom) Mortimer Morris-Goodall	Aston Martin Speed	Aston Martin 1967cc S4	D	177*	150	engine (21hr)
DNF	1.1	37	(France) Écurie Gordini	(France) Amédée Gordini (France) José Scaron	Simca 8 Gordini	Fiat 1094cc.S4	D	152*	140	engine (morning)
DNF	1.5	36	(France) P. Ferry (private entrant)	(France) Pierre Ferry (France) Francis Noireaux	Riley TT Sprite	Riley 1490cc. S4	D	166	127	gearbox (16hr)
DNF	1.1	43	(France) Écurie Gordini	(France) Robert Lévy (France) Adrien Alin	Simca 6 Gordini	Fiat 996cc S4	D	148	124	suspension (21hr)
DNF	1.1	38	(France) Écurie Gordini	(France) Jean Viale (France) Jean Breillet	Simca 8 Gordini	Fiat 1088cc.S4	D	152	111	accident damage (dawn)
DNF	3.0	23	(France) Mme F. Roux / Mme G. Rouault (private entrant)	(France) Fernande Roux (France) Germaine Rouault	Amilcar Pégase G36	Amilcar 2.5L S4	D	185	101	engine (12hr)
DNF	5.0	4	(Italy) Luigi Chinetti	(France) René Carrière (France) René Le Bègue	Talbot-Lago T150C	Talbot 4.0L S6	D	197	101	gearbox (night)
DNF	5.0	12	(France) G. Monneret (France) R. Loyer (private entrant)	(France) Georges Monneret (France) Roger Loyer	Delahaye 135 Compétition	Delahaye 3.6L S6	D	195	88	fuel pump (night)
DNF	5.0	6	(France) L. Rosier (private entrant) (Italy) Luigi Chinetti	(France) Louis Rosier (France) Robert Huguet	Talbot-Lago T150 SS Coupé	Talbot 4.0L S6	D	197	81	engine (late night)
DNF	1.1	47	(United Kingdom) Team Autosports	(United Kingdom) Donald Barnes (United Kingdom) Tommy Wisdom	Singer Nine Le Mans Replica	Singer 973cc S4	D	146	74	engine (night)
DNF	1.1	45	(France) Just-Émile Vernet	(France) Gaston Tramer (France) Paul Samuel	Simca 8 Gordini	Fiat 1011cc.S4	D	148	69	engine (night)
DNF	5.0	3	(Italy) Luigi Chinetti	(Italy) Luigi Chinetti (France) Philippe Étancelin	Talbot-Lago T150C	Talbot 4.5L S6	D	200	66	engine (7hr)
DNF	3.0	22	(France) Société R.V.	(France) Jacques de Valence de Minardière (France) Louis Gérard	Delage D6-70	Delage 3.0L S6	D	190*	58	engine (7hr)
DNF	1.1	41	(France) Just-Émile Vernet	(France) Just-Émile Vernet (France) Suzanne Largeot	Simca 8 Gordini	Fiat 1094cc.S4	D	152*	55	engine (night)
DNF	5.0	21	(France) M. Horvilleur (private entrant)	(France) Marcel Horvilleur (France) Yves Matra	Alfa Romeo 2600 Monza	Alfa Romeo 2.7L S8 twin-supercharged	D	199	53	engine (7hr)
DNF	5.0	11	(France) J. Paul (private entrant)	(France) Marcel Mongin (France) Robert Mazaud	Delahaye 135 CS	Delahaye 3.6L S6	D	195*	50	fire (5hr)
DNF	1.1	50	(United Kingdom) Miss D. Stanley-Turner (private entrant)	(United Kingdom) Elsie Wisdom (United Kingdom) Arthur Dobson	MG Midget PB	MG 936cc S4	D	144	48	clutch (evening)
DNF	1.1	39	(France) Écurie Gordini	(France) Angelo Molinari (France) Georges Sarret	Simca 6 Gordini	Fiat 999cc.S4	D	148	40	engine (evening)
DNF	1.5	29	(France) Écurie Eudel (France) R. Forestier (private entrant)	(France) Raoul Forestier (Switzerland) Roger Caron	Riley TT Sprite	Riley 1496cc. S4	D	166	30	gearbox (evening)
DNF	5.0	1	(France) Écurie Bleue	(France) René Dreyfus (Monaco) Louis Chiron	Delahaye 145	Delahaye 4.5L V12	D	200*	21	engine (2hr)
DNF	2.0	25	(France) Émile Darl'mat	(France) Jean Pujol (France) Louis Rigal	Peugeot 402 Darl'mat Spéciale Sport	Peugeot 1998cc S4	D	177*	18	engine (2hr)
DNF	5.0	2	(France) Écurie Bleue	(Italy) Gianfranco Comotti (France) Albert Divo	Delahaye 145	Delahaye 4.5L V12	D	200	7	gearbox (1hr)
DNF	2.0	26	(France) Émile Darl'mat	(France) Maurice Serre (France) Daniel Porthault	Peugeot 402 Darl'mat Spéciale Sport	Peugeot 1998cc S4	D	177*	6	gearbox (1hr)
DNF	1.5	34	(United Kingdom) C.H.H. Morrison (private entrant)	(United Kingdom) Charles Morrison (United Kingdom) Neil Watson	Atalanta	Atalanta 1995cc S4	D	166	4	suspension (1hr)
Sources:

- Note *: [B]= car also entered in the 1937-38 Biennial Cup.
- Note **: equivalent class for supercharging, with x1.65 modifier to engine capacity.

=== Did Not Start ===
Pos	Class	No	Team	Drivers	Chassis	Engine	Reason
DNA	5.0	9	(Australia) J. Snow (private entrant)		Delahaye 135 CS	Delahaye 3.6L S6	Did not arrive
DNS	5.0	16	(France) Roger Labric		Bugatti Type 57S	Bugatti 3.3L S8	Did not start
DNA	5.0	18	(United Kingdom) T.A.S.O. Mathieson (private entrant)		Bugatti Type 57S	Bugatti 3.3L S8	Did not arrive
DNA	5.0	20	(Switzerland) Hans Ruesch (private entrant)	(Switzerland) Hans Ruesch	Alfa Romeo 8C 2900B Coupé	Alfa Romeo 3.0L S8 supercharged	Did not arrive
DNA	1.5	30	(United Kingdom) A.C. Scott (private entrant)	(United Kingdom) Archie Scott	HRG Le Mans	Meadows 1499cc S4	Did not arrive
DNA	1.5	32	(United Kingdom) J. Elliott (private entrant)		Triumph Dolomite	Triumph 1496cc S4	Did not arrive
DNA	1.5	35	(United Kingdom) T.E. Kenny (private entrant)		Lancia Aprilia	Lancia 1486cc V4	Did not arrive
DNA	1.1	44	(France) P. Pichard (private entrant)	(France) Pierre Pichard	Salmson Grand Sport	Salmson 1094cc S4	Did not arrive

=== 1938 Index of Performance ===
Pos	1937-38 Biennial Cup	Class	No.	Team	Drivers	Chassis	Index Result
1	-	750	51	(France) Écurie Gordini	(France) Maurice Aimé (France) Charles Plantivaux	Simca 5 Gordini	1.280
2	1st	2.0	28	(Germany) Adlerwerke	(Germany) Peter, Graf Orssich (Germany) Rudolf Sauerwein	Adler Trumpf Super Rennlimousine	1.236
3	2nd	1.5	33	(Germany) Adlerwerke	(Germany) Otto Löhr (Germany) Paul von Guilleaume	Adler Trumpf Rennlimousine	1.230
4	-	5.0	15	(France) E. Chaboud & J. Trémoulet (private entrant)	(France) Eugène Chaboud (France) Jean Trémoulet	Delahaye 135 CS	1.209
5	3rd	2.0	24	(France) Émile Darl'mat	(France) Charles de Cortanze (France) Marcel Contet	Peugeot 402 Darl'mat Spéciale Sport	1.204
6	-	5.0	14	(France) G. Serraud (private entrant)	(France) Gaston Serraud (France) Yves Giraud-Cabantous	Delahaye 135 CS	1.199
7	-	1.1	46	(France) J. Savoye (private entrant)	(France) Jacques Savoye (France) Pierre Savoye	Singer Nine "Savoye Spéciale"	1.191
8	-	750	52	(France) Écurie Gordini	(France) Albert Leduc (France) Athos Querzola	Simca 5 Gordini	1.185
9	-	1.1	42	(France) Just-Émile Vernet	(France) Guy Lapchin (France) Albert Debille	Simca 8 Gordini	1.133
10	-	1.1	49	(France) C. Bonneau (private entrant)	(France) Claude Bonneau (France) Anne-Cécile Rose-Itier	MG Midget PB Spéciale	1.132

- Note: A score of 1.00 means meeting the minimum distance for the car, and a higher score is exceeding the nominal target distance. Only the top 10 of the 15 finishers of this year's competition are listed. There were three finishers in the 11 eligible cars in the Biennial Cup.

=== Class Winners ===
Class	Winning Car	Winning Drivers
A/B - over 5-litre	no entries	
C - 3 to 5-litre	#15 Delahaye 135 CS	Chaboud / Trémoulet
D - 2 to 3-litre	no finishers	
E - 1500 to 2000cc	#24 Peugeot 402 Darl'mat Spéciale Sport	de Cortanze / Contet *
F - 1100 to 1500cc	#33 Adler Trumpf Rennlimousine	Löhr / von Guilleaume
G - 750 to 1100cc (new class)	#46 Singer Nine Le Mans Spéciale	Savoye / Savoye *
H - Up to 750cc (new class)	#51 Simca Cinq Gordini	Aimé / Plantivaux *
Note *: setting a new class distance record.

=== Statistics ===
- Fastest Lap – R. Sommer, #19 Alfa Romeo 8C-2900B – 5:13.8secs; 154.78 km/h (96.18 mph)
- Winning Distance – 3,180.9 km (1,976.5 mi)
- Winner’s Average Speed – 132.5 km/h (82.3 mph)
