= Delahaye 134 =

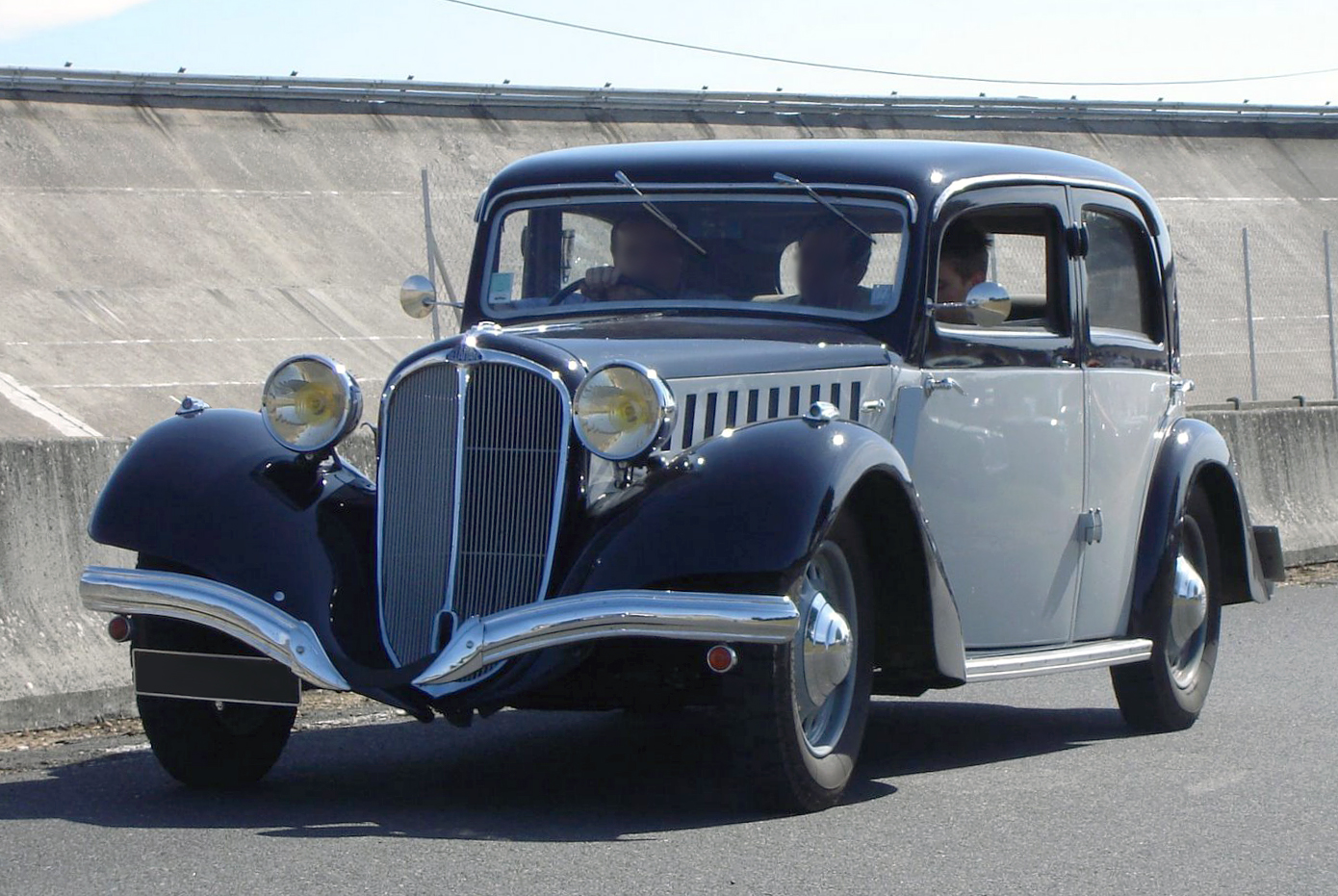

Overview
- Manufacturer: Delahaye
- Production: 1933–1946
- Designer: Jean François

Body and chassis
- Class: Luxury car
- Layout: Front-engine, rear-wheel-drive
- Related: Delahaye 135/138/148

Powertrain
- Engine: 2151 cc I4; 2371 cc I4 (134 G)
- Transmission: 4-speed manual; 4-speed pre-selector

Dimensions
- Wheelbase: 2,950 mm (116.1 in); 3,150 mm (124.0 in)

The Delahaye 134 is a four-cylinder luxury automobile manufactured by Delahaye. Based on Jean François' Delahaye 135, it was produced from 1933 to 1940 (from 1936 as the 134N) and was briefly brought back by Delahaye manager Charles Weiffenbach in 1945 after hostilities ended. At the same time, the larger engined 134G also appeared. As a part of the "Plan Pons" aimed at reviving French industry, Delahaye was to focus on building luxury cars, in particular for the export markets. The lesser 134 did not suit the plan and was taken out of production by 1946, in preference to the more lucrative 135, 148, and 175 models. Most 134s built carried saloon bodywork by Autobineau, a subsidiary of Letourneur et Marchand.

The 2.15-liter engine (bore and stroke of 80 mm × 107 mm (3.1 in × 4.2 in)) of the 134 and 134N was a four-cylinder version of the 3.2-litre, four-bearing overhead valve inline-six from the 135, itself based on a lorry engine. Power was 50 hp (37 kW) at 3800 rpm. This engine was also sold to Amilcar, who installed it in their Pégase car from 1934 until 1937. Amilcar, however, claimed a max power of 58 hp (43 kW). Like the 135, the 134s featured independent, leaf-sprung front suspension, a live rear axle, and cable operated Bendix brakes. Transmission was either a four-speed manual or a four-speed Cotal pre-selector. A total of 340 134N were built, of which about 100 examples post-war (these are almost entirely identical to 1939 models), mainly for the domestic market.

Twenty or so of the 2.4-liter 14 CV 134G models were built in 1945–1946, only for export. However, with steel supplies savagely rationed under the government's restructuring strategy for the auto industry, the manufacturer chose to concentrate production on their larger, potentially more lucrative, 6-cylinder models such as their 135.

== Gallery ==
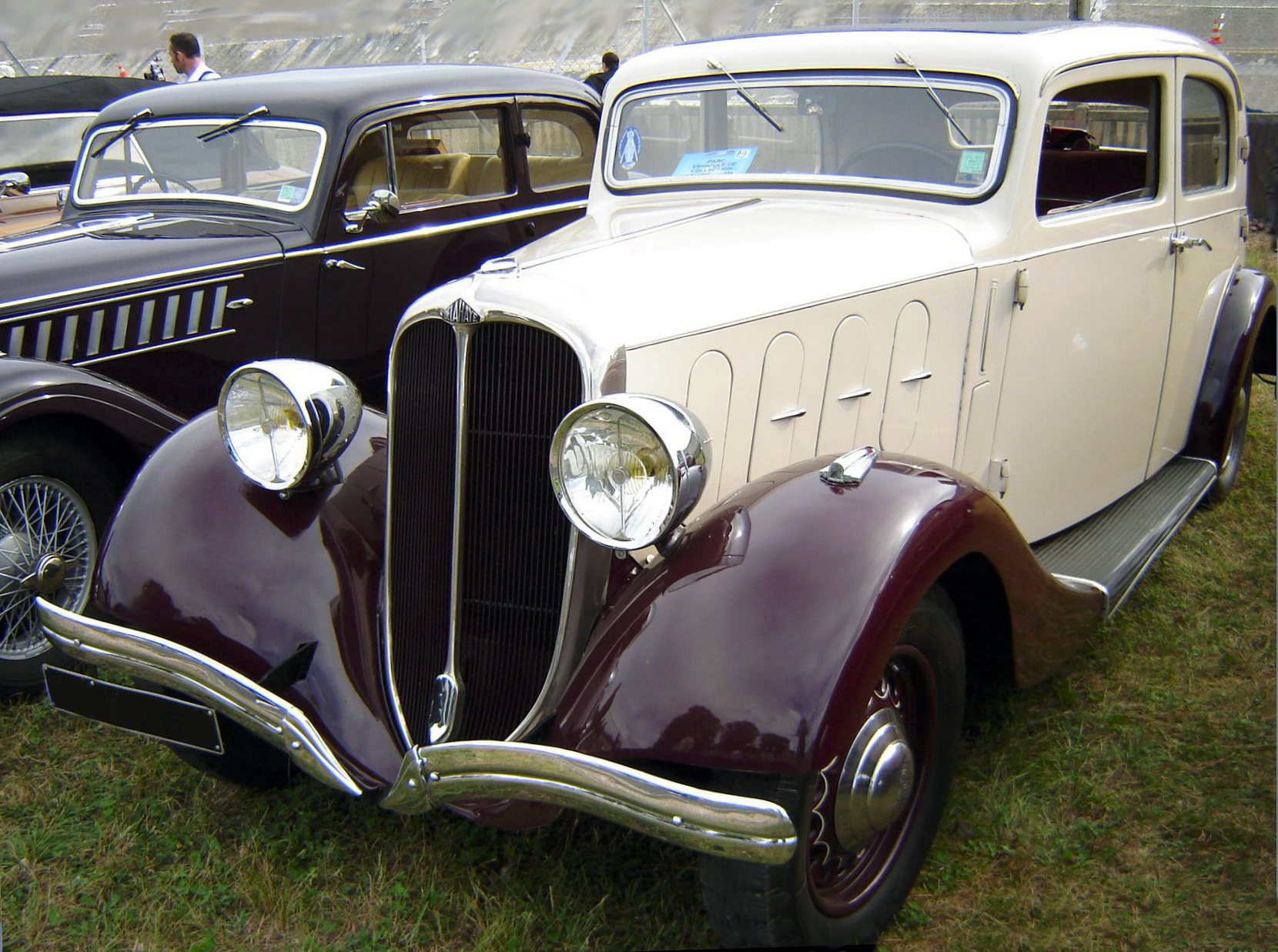
Delahaye 134

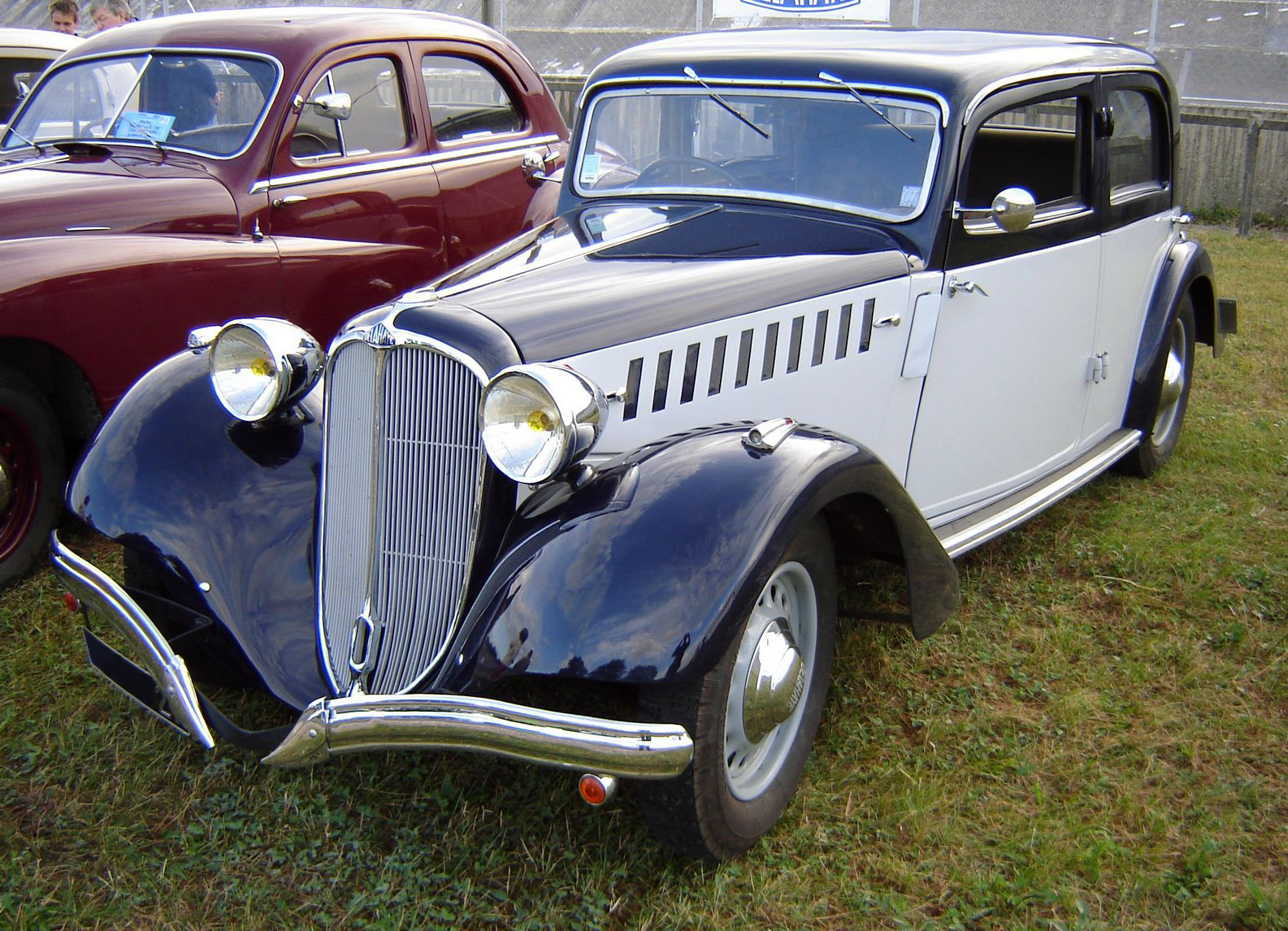
Delahaye 134-N

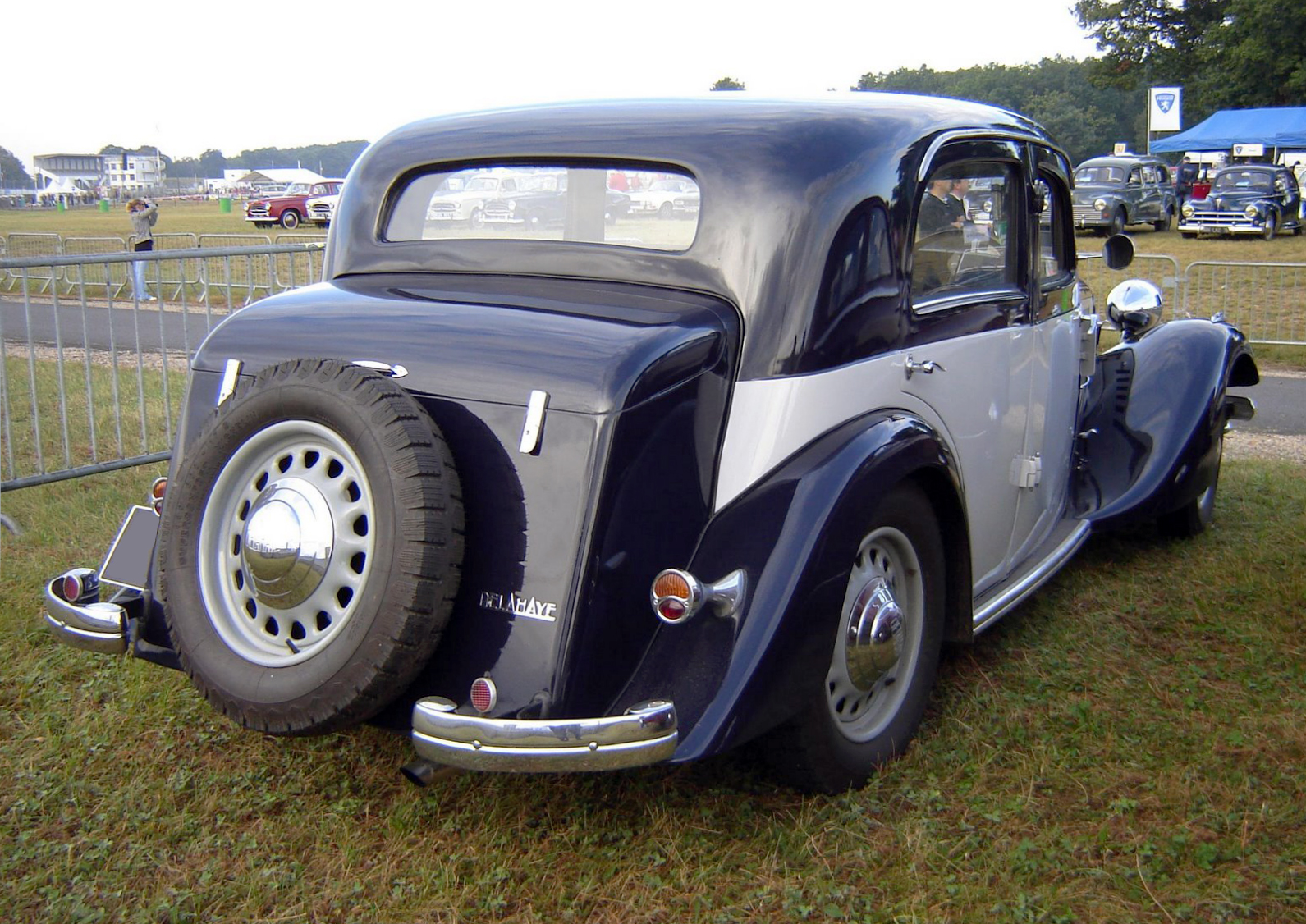
Delahaye 134-N

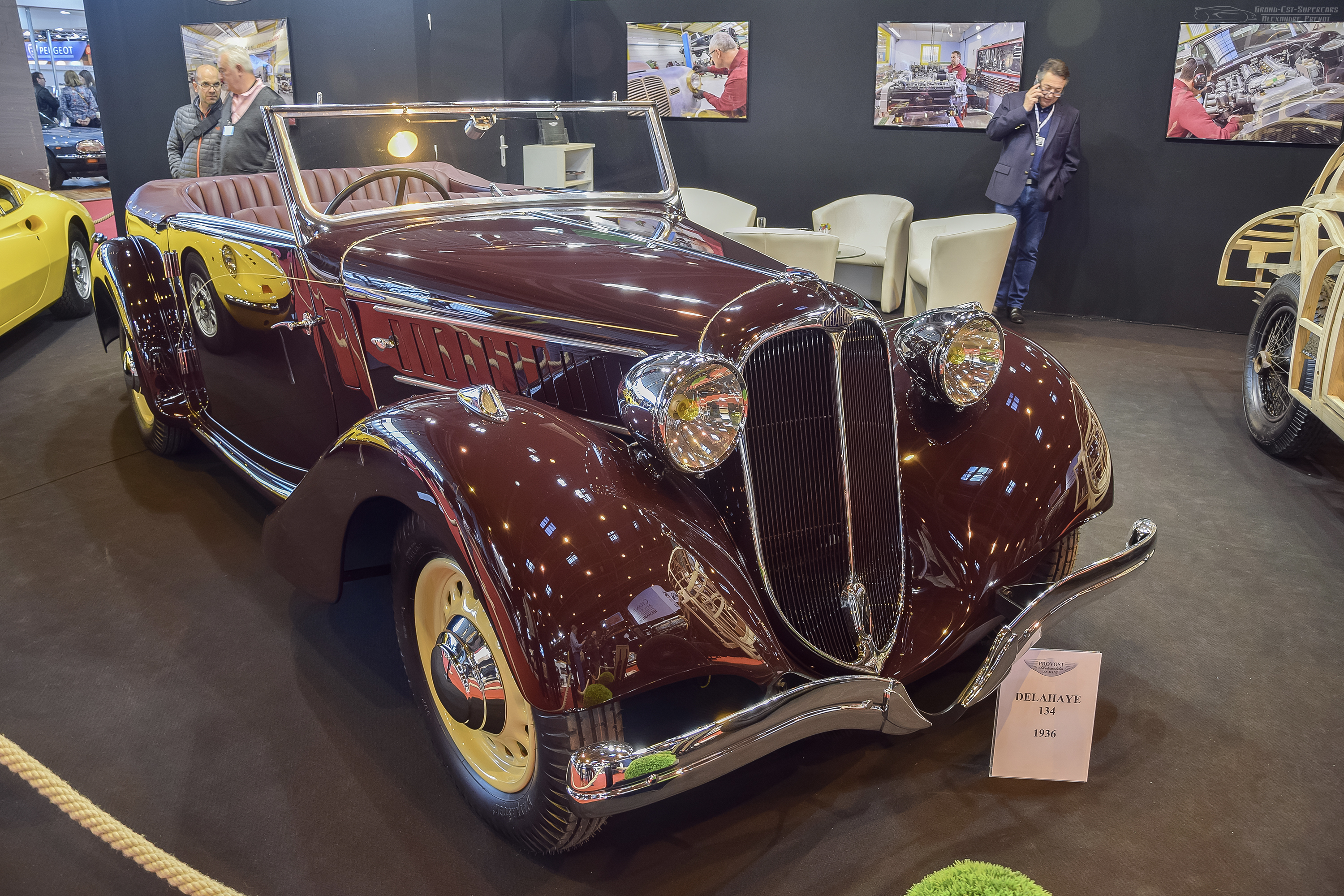
1936 Delahaye 134

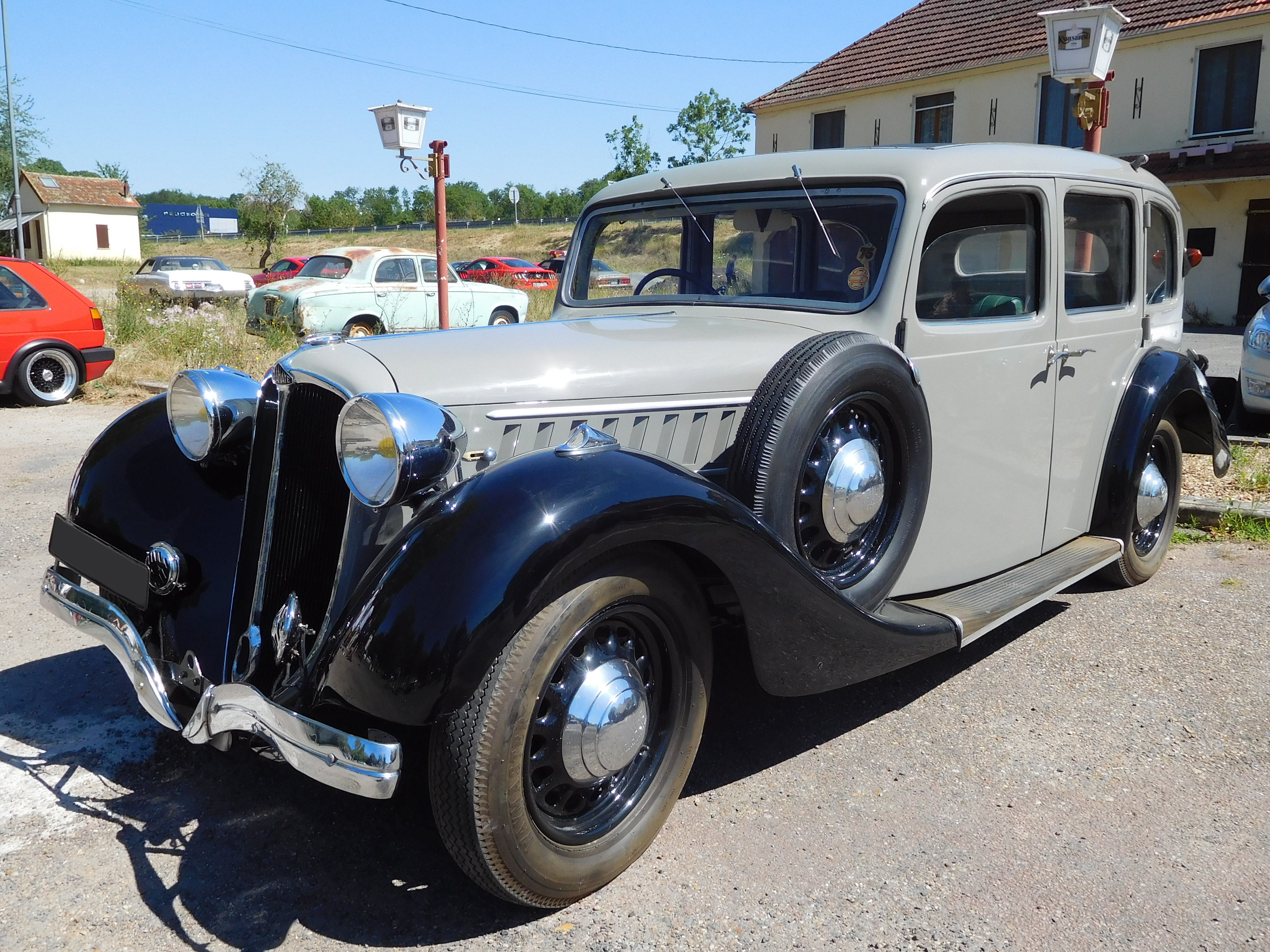
Delahaye 134-NL

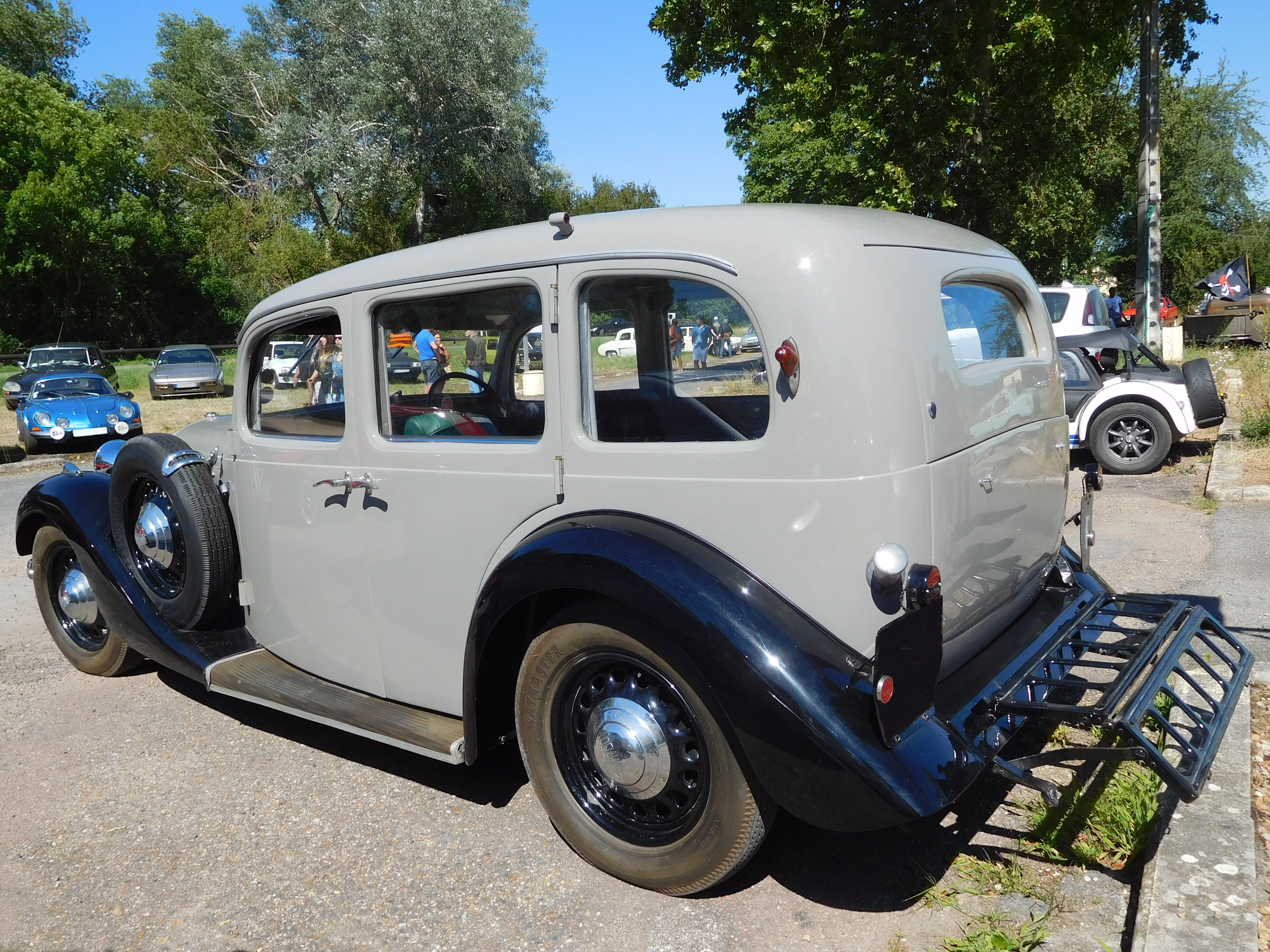
Delahaye 134-NL

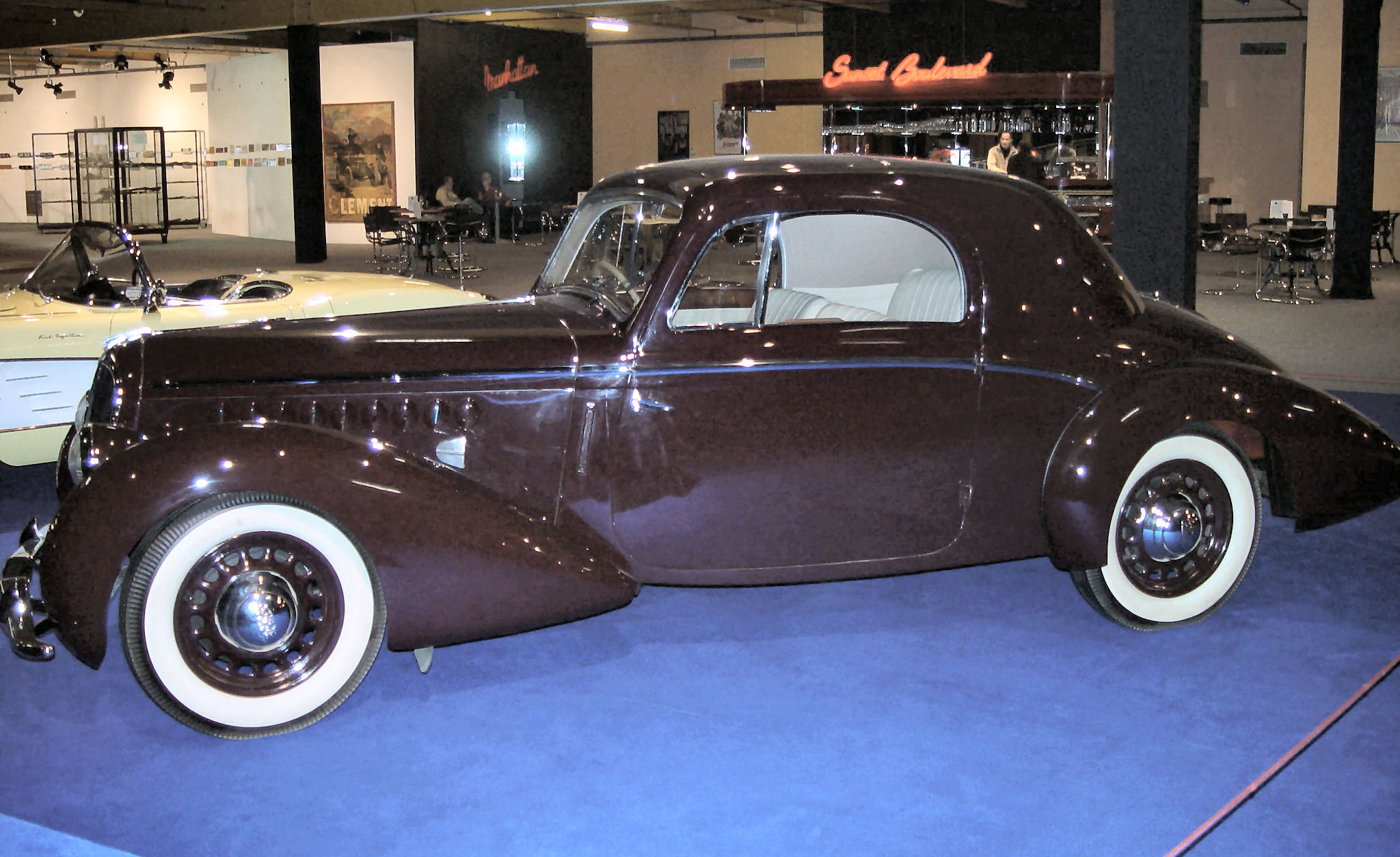
Chapron bodied 1938 134N Berline
