= Amilcar Pégase =

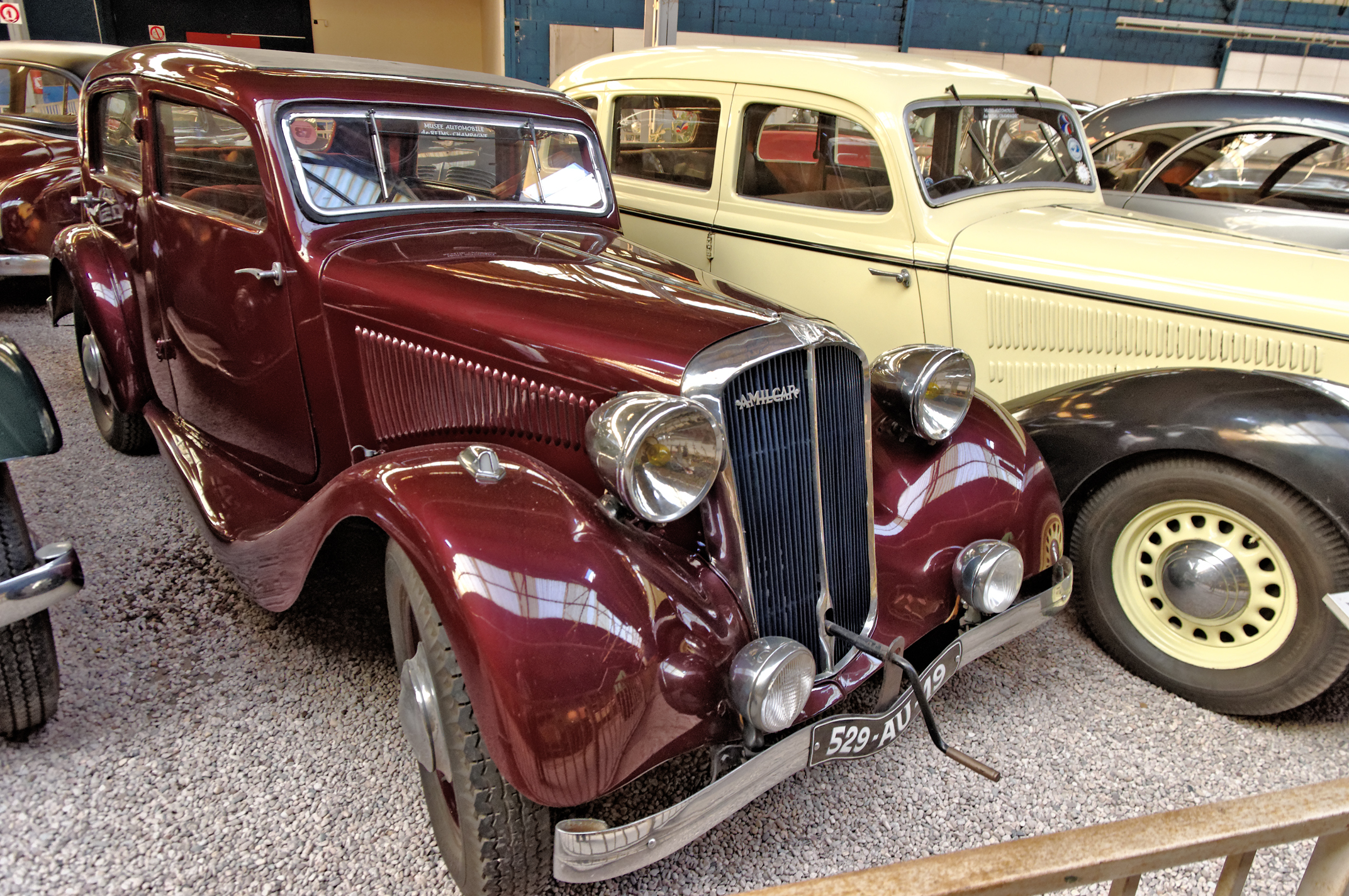
- Amilcar Pégase (Berline) 1935

Overview
- Manufacturer: Amilcar
- Production: 1934–1937

Body and chassis
- Body style: coupé cabriolet saloon/sedan

Powertrain
- Engine: 2150 cc Delahaye 134 I4 (1934-1937); 2490 cc Grillot I4 (1935-1937)
- Transmission: Four speed manual

Dimensions
- Wheelbase: 2,800 mm (110 in)

The Amilcar Pégase is a mid-sized car made between 1934 and 1937 by the French Amilcar company. The 2150 cc four-cylinder engine placed it in the 12CV car tax band. Other engine sizes, including a 2490 cc (14CV) unit developed in-house, were also listed.

The car's introduction coincided with the final chapter of Amilcar's struggle for survival. After 1935 the Pégase was the manufacturer's only listed model, and by the time it was delisted, the residuum of Amilcar had been absorbed into Hotchkiss.

The Amilcar Pégase offered a range of bodies that featured the stylish aerodynamic look that became fashionable in the mid 1930s. When first shown, the car had the headlights mounted up high within the grille, but this was abandoned in favour of a more traditional layout on the production models.

== Engines ==
The car was first shown with an ohc 2120-cc (12CV) four-cylinder unit designed by the manufacturer's own engineer whose name was Grillot. In the event it was decided that it would be more cost effective to fit the similarly sized Delahaye engine and it is doubtful whether any of the Grillot-engined, 12CV Pégases were ever offered for sale. Instead, the Pégase was launched with a four-cylinder 2150-cc (12CV) engine produced by Delahaye, who installed it in the Delahaye 134N. In the Amilcar application a maximum output of 58 hp (43 kW) was listed. Top speed would have varied according to the weight and style of the body specified, but a maximum of approximately 130 km/h (81 mph) was quoted.

The in-house engineering team nevertheless persisted and in 1935 a larger "compétition" engine, designed by Grillot and based on his earlier design, was added to the list, providing up to 75 hp (55 kW) of power from 2490 cc.

== Bodies ==
Amilcar had no in-house facilities for producing the steel car bodies that had become the norm during the early 1930s, so these would have been supplied by outside contractors, which allowed, at least in theory, for considerable flexibility. The manufacturer's publicity material presented at the 1935 Paris Motor Show for the 1936 model year held out the promise of no fewer than eleven different body types. A year later, in October 1936, the number of bodies had been reduced to four, these being the "Skiff" 2-seater roadster, the "Fleuret" 2-door 4-seater cabriolet, the "Amazone" 2-door 4-seater coupé and the "Saint-Hubert" 4-door, 4-seater sedan/saloon. At the motor show in 1936 the 2150 cc (12CV) Pégase chassis was priced at 26,900 Francs, while customers content to select from one of the manufacturer's four standard bodies would find listed prices ranging from 37,900 Francs for the "Amazone" coupé to 42,900 Francs for the "Fleuret" and "Skiff"-bodied cars.

== Troubled times ==
The Pégase continued to be produced after the Amilcar plant was closed down in August 1934, from the (very much smaller) premises at Boulogne-Billancourt to which the manufacturer had been obliged to relocate. There were certainly enough cars to make a good showing at the motor show in 1935, though by the time of the 1936 motor show the 14CV engine car was no longer on display. The Pégase appears to have had no place in the Hotchkiss plans for the Amilcar business, and once Hotchkiss had taken control the Amilcar Pégase was withdrawn from sale.
