= 1936 24 Hours of Le Mans =

Cancelled motorsport event

| Previous: 1935 | Next: 1937 |
Index: Races | Winners

The 1936 24 Hours of Le Mans was originally planned to be the 14th Grand Prix of Endurance to be held on 14 and 15 June 1936. However, after several years of economic recession, France was in the middle of the turmoil and civil unrest sweeping over Europe. A general strike across the country in the wake of the recent electoral victory of the Popular Front had only been resolved days before scrutineering was due to start. In response to the dominance of the German teams in grand prix racing, the Automobile Club de France (ACF) had chosen to run their Grand Prix to a sports-car formula, which would in turn be eligible to run at Le Mans. Owing to the strikes, many of the teams had been unable to prepare their cars sufficiently, and even such matters as getting fuel, transportation or fuel for entrants and spectators would be difficult.

Therefore, at the beginning of June, the ACO organisers postponed the race. However, at the end of the month, being unable to arrange a suitable alternative date later in the year with the motorsport governing body (the AIACR), the event was cancelled.

There had been fifty-eight entries applied at the time of cancellation. It comprised French teams of Talbot, Delahaye, and Delage, along with privateer cars using Alfa Romeo, Lagonda, and Bugatti.

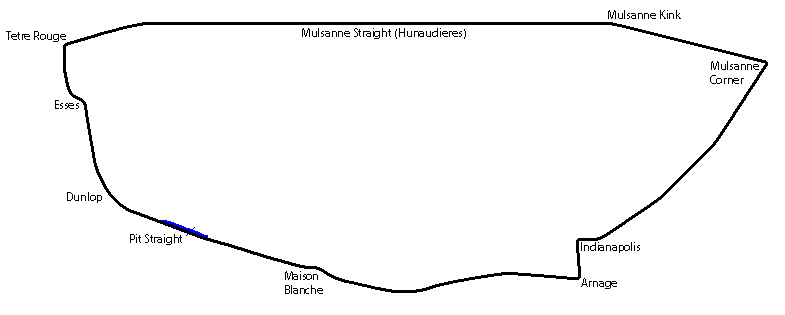
Le Mans circuit in 1936

== Regulations ==
The AIACR had introduced the new 750 kg Grand Prix Formula in 1934. It had taken a year, but the state-sponsored German teams of Mercedes-Benz and Auto Union now dominated racing. The formerly pre-eminent teams of Alfa Romeo, Maserati and Bugatti had tried to compete but were quite out-classed. After two years with no success, the Automobile Club de France (ACF) decided not to hold the French Grand Prix to the AIACR formula. That meant, of course, that it was no longer part of the European Championship, but in a period of growing international tensions, the ACF wanted to return French national pride in their motorsport. Their answer was to run the Grand Prix to its own, new regulations – open to two-seater, open-top cars matching the manufacturers' public purchase catalogues. There were no limits placed on engine-capacity nor weight, however supercharging was prohibited. At least 20 had to have been built by January 1, 1936, or in the process of being built.

This was strongly supported by French motor-industry and followed a similar ban on supercharged cars by the British RAC for the 1934 International Tourist Trophy. The Le Mans race was scheduled two weeks before the French Grand Prix and the Automobile Club de l'Ouest (ACO) promptly ratified that ACF-regulation cars would be given entry. They did choose to keep the racing-classes from the previous year. They also allowed superchargers but raised the equivalency calculation of capacity from x1.4 to x1.6.

== Entries ==
The changes by the ACF in turn provided the incentive for probably the strongest Le Mans entry list to date. This meant that French cars once again had the very real prospect of outright victory. A dozen cars came from the ACF regulations – from Delahaye, Delage and Talbot-Lago. The new Bugatti was not ready though. Of the 58 cars, fully 30 could be classed as works, or works-supported, entries, representing 13 manufacturers. It also saw the entry of Adler, only the second German manufacturer to enter Le Mans. From the previous year’s race, there were sixteen cars entering for the Coupe Bienniale.

| Category | Entries | Classes |
|---|---|---|
| Large-sized engines | 23 | over 3-litre |
| Medium-sized engines | 10 | 1.5 to 3-litre |
| Small-sized engines | 25 | up to 1.5-litre |
| Total entrants | 58 | |

== Official entry list ==
List taken from Quentin Spurring's book, officially licensed by the ACO. It references the ACO archives which had a provisional numbering by an official. Normally sorted by engine capacity, there are several cars out of the regular sequence that would have been corrected for the final race entry list.

| No. | Class | Team | Drivers | Chassis | Engine | Biennial Entry |
|---|---|---|---|---|---|---|
| 1 | 4.0+ * | (Australia) / (United Kingdom) F.J. McEvoy (private entrant) | (Australia) / (United Kingdom) Frederick McEvoy | Mercedes-Benz 540K | Mercedes-Benz 5.4L S8 supercharged | |
| 2 | 4.0+ * | (France) G. Nancy (private entrant) | (France) Georges Nancy. Pehache | Bugatti Type 50 Sports | Bugatti 5.0L S8 supercharged | |
| 23 | 4.0+ * | (France) R. Labric (private entrant) | (France) Roger Labric | Bugatti Type 50 Sports | Bugatti 5.0L S8 supercharged | |
| 34 | 4.0+ * | (France) "Jean Renaldi" (private entrant) | (France) "Jean Renaldi" (André Carré) | Bugatti Type 50 Sports | Bugatti 5.0L S8 supercharged | |
| 3 | 4.0+ | (United Kingdom) Arthur W. Fox | (United Kingdom) Brian Lewis, Baron Essendon (United Kingdom) Tim Rose-Richards | Lagonda M45 Rapide | Meadows 4.4L S6 | B |
| 4 | 5.0 | (United Kingdom) Arthur W. Fox | (United Kingdom) Goldie Gardner (United Kingdom) Freddy Clifford | Lagonda M45 Rapide | Meadows 4.4L S6 | |
| 5 | 4.0+ | (United Kingdom) E. Hall (private entrant) | (United Kingdom) Eddie Hall | Bentley TT 4.5 | Bentley 4.3L S6 | |
| 6 | 4.0 | (France) Automobiles Talbot-Lago | (France) René Dreyfus | Talbot T150C | Talbot 4.0L S6 | |
| 7 | 4.0 | (France) Automobiles Talbot-Lago | (France) André Morel (United Kingdom) Jim Bradley | Talbot T150C | Talbot 4.0L S6 | |
| 8 | 4.0 | (France) P. Louis-Dreyfus (private entrant) | (France) "Heldé" (Pierre Louis-Dreyfus) | Talbot T150C | Talbot 4.0L S6 | B |
| 9 | 3.0 | (Italy) L. Chinetti (private entrant) | (Italy) Luigi Chinetti (France) Raymond Sommer | Alfa Romeo 8C-2900 A | Alfa Romeo 2.9L S8 | |
| 10 | 4.0 * | (France) Viscomte P. Merlin (private entrant) | (France) Viscomte Pierre Merlin | Alfa Romeo 8C-2300 LM | Alfa Romeo 2.3L S8 supercharged | |
| 11 | 4.0 * | (France) J. Chancerelle (private entrant) | (France) J. Chancerelle | Alfa Romeo 8C-2300 LM | Alfa Romeo 2.3L S8 supercharged | |
| 12 | 4.0 | (United States) / (France) L. O'Reilly Schell (private entrant) | (United States) / (France) Lucy O'Reilly Schell (France) René Carrière | Delahaye 135 CS | Delahaye 3.6L S6 | |
| 14 | 4.0 | (France) L. Villeneuve (private entrant) | (France) Louis Villeneuve (France) André Vagniez | Delahaye 135 CS | Delahaye 3.6L S6 | B |
| 15 | 4.0 | (France) "Michel Paris" (private entrant) | (France) "Michel Paris" (Henri Toulouse) (France) Marcel Mongin | Delahaye 135 CS | Delahaye 3.6L S6 | B |
| 16 | 4.0 | (France) Société des Automobiles; Delahaye | (France) . Dhôme (France) Albert Perrot | Delahaye 135 CS | Delahaye 3.6L S6 | |
| 18 | 4.0 | (France) Société des Automobiles; Delahaye | (France) Albert Divo (France) Robert Girod | Delahaye 135 CS | Delahaye 3.6L S6 | |
| 19 | 4.0 | (France) Écurie Jacques Menier (private entrant) | (France) Philippe Maillard-Brune (France) Charles Druck | Delahaye 135 CS | Delahaye 3.6L S6 | B |
| 20 | 4.0 | (France) D. Porthault (private entrant) | (France) Daniel Porthault (France) René Marie | Delahaye 135 CS | Delahaye 3.6L S6 | |
| 21 | 4.0 | (France) R. Le Bègue (private entrant) | (France) Réné Le Bègue (France) Jean Danne | Delahaye 135 CS | Delahaye 3.6L S6 | |
| 22 | 4.0 | (France) E. Chaboud (private entrant) | (France) Eugène Chaboud (France) Jean Trémoulet | Delahaye 138 Spéciale | Delahaye 3.6L S6 | |
| - | 4.0 | (United Kingdom) Earl Howe (private entrant) | (United Kingdom) Francis Curzon, Earl Howe | Bugatti Type 57T | Bugatti 3.3L S8 | |
| 24 | 3.0 | (France) R. Kippeurt (private entrant) | (France) René Kippeurt | Bugatti Type 44 | Bugatti 3.0L S8 | |
| 25 | 4.0 | (France) Société Nouvelle des Automobiles Delage | (France) Henri Fretet (France) Robert Laly | Delage D6-80 | Delage 3.2L S6 | |
| - | 4.0 | (France) Société Nouvelle des Automobiles Delage | | Delage D6-80 | Delage 3.2L S6 | |
| 26 | 2.0 | (United Kingdom) J.C. Noël (private entrant) | (United Kingdom) Charles Brackenbury (United Kingdom) Pat Fairfield | Aston Martin Speed | Aston Martin 1967cc S4 | B |
| 27 | 2.0 | (United Kingdom) Aston Martin Ltd | (United Kingdom) Sammy Davis (United Kingdom) Bill Everitt | Aston Martin Speed | Aston Martin 1967cc S4 | |
| 28 | 2.0 | (France) G. Pfister (private entrant) | (France) Guy Pfister (France) Jean-Pierre Rault | Citroën Traction Avant 11CV | Citroën 1911cc S4 | |
| 29 | 2.0 * | (Netherlands) E. Hertzberger (private entrant) | (Netherlands) Eddie Hertzberger | MG K3 Magnette | MG 1087cc S4 supercharged | |
| 43 | 2.0 * | (United Kingdom) Capt. G.E.T. Eyston | | MG K3 Magnette | MG 1087cc S4 supercharged | B |
| 30 | 2.0 | (France) Mme A.-C. Rose-Itier (private entrant) | (France) Anne-Cécile Rose-Itier ? . Boetzkes | Adler Super Trumpf Rennlimousine | Adler 1645cc S4 sidevalve | B |
| 31 | 2.0 | (Germany) Adlerwerke | (Germany) Rudolf Sauerwein (Germany) Peter Graf Orssich | Adler Super Trumpf Rennlimousine | Adler 1645cc S4 sidevalve | |
| 32 | 2.0 | (Germany) Adlerwerke | (Austria) Wilhelm "Max", Prinz zu Schaumburg-Lippe ? Edouard Legré | Adler Super Trumpf Rennlimousine | Adler 1645cc S4 sidevalve | |
| 33 | 2.0 | (Germany) Adlerwerke | (Germany) Otto Löhr (Germany) Paul von Guillaume | Adler Super Trumpf Rennlimousine | Adler 1645cc S4 sidevalve | |
| 35 | 1.5 | (United Kingdom) Automobiles Frazer Nash Ltd | (United Kingdom) "Tim Davies" (Dudley Folland) (United Kingdom) Alfred Fane | Frazer Nash | Gough 1496cc S4 | |
| 36 | 1.5 | (United Kingdom) Riley (Coventry) Ltd | (France) Jean Sébilleau (United Kingdom) Cyril Paul | Riley TT Sprite | Riley 1496cc S4 | B |
| 37 | 1.5 | (United Kingdom) Riley (Coventry) Ltd | (United Kingdom) Alex “Bill” van der Becke (United Kingdom) Edgar Maclure | Riley TT Sprite | Riley 1496cc S4 | |
| 38 | 1.5 | (United Kingdom) Riley (Coventry) Ltd (France) J. Trévoux (private entrant) | (France) Jean Trévoux (United Kingdom) Charles Dobson | Riley TT Sprite | Riley 1496cc S4 | |
| 39 | 1.5 | (United Kingdom) Aston Martin Ltd | (United Kingdom) . Headlam (United Kingdom) Boris Harcourt-Wood | Aston Martin Ulster | Aston Martin 1494cc S4 | |
| 40 | 1.5 | (United Kingdom) Aston Martin Ltd | (United Kingdom) Dr Dudley Benjafield (United Kingdom) Jim Elwes | Aston Martin Ulster | Aston Martin 1494cc S4 | |
| 41 | 1.5 | (United Kingdom) Aston Martin Ltd | (United Kingdom) Mortimer Morris-Goodall | Aston Martin Ulster | Aston Martin 1494cc S4 | |
| 42 | 1.5 | (United Kingdom) C.T. Thomas (private entrant) | | Aston Martin Ulster | Aston Martin 1494cc S4 | B |
| 44 | 1.5 | (United Kingdom) M.K.H. Bilney (private entrant) | (United Kingdom) Maurice Bilney (Australia) Joan Richmond | Ford 10 Model CX Special | Ford 1172cc S4 | |
| 45 | 750 | (France) Amédée Gordini | | SIMCA Cinq Gordini | Simca 570cc S4 | |
| 46 | 750 | (France) Amédée Gordini | | SIMCA Cinq Gordini | Simca 570cc S4 | |
| 47 | 750 | (France) Amédée Gordini | | SIMCA Cinq Gordini | Simca 570cc S4 | |
| 48 | 750 | (France) M. Moly (private entrant) | | SIMCA Cinq Gordini | Simca 570cc S4 | |
| 49 | 750 | (France) Clément-Auguste Martin (private entrant) | (France) Clément-Auguste Martin | SIMCA Cinq Gordini | Simca 570cc S4 | |
| 50 | 750 | (France) J.-É. Vernet (private entrant) | (France) Just-Émile Vernet (France) Gaston Tramer | SIMCA Cinq Gordini | Simca 570cc S4 | |
| 51 | 1.0 | (United Kingdom) Team Autosports (United Kingdom) F.S. Barnes (private entrant) | (United Kingdom) Norman Black (United Kingdom) Tommy Wisdom | Singer Nine Le Mans Replica | Singer 973cc S4 | B |
| 52 | 1.0 | (United Kingdom) Team Autosports (United Kingdom) R. Eccles (private entrant) | (United Kingdom) Roy Eccles (United Kingdom) Marjorie Eccles | Singer Nine Le Mans Replica | Singer 973cc S4 | B |
| 53 | 1.0 | (United Kingdom) Team Autosports (United Kingdom) M. Collier (private entrant) | (United Kingdom) Michael Collier (United Kingdom) Alf Langley | Singer Nine Le Mans | Singer 973cc S4 | |
| 54 | 1.0 | (United Kingdom) A.R. Marsh (private entrant) | (United Kingdom) Arthur Marsh (United Kingdom) Trevor Guest | Singer Nine Le Mans | Singer 973cc S4 | |
| 55 | 1.0 | (France) R. Gaillard (private entrant) | (France) Raymond Gaillard (France) . Corbell | Singer Nine Le Mans | Singer 973cc S4 | B |
| 56 | 750 | (United Kingdom) Austin Motor Co. | (United Kingdom) Pat Driscoll (United Kingdom) Charles Goodacre | Austin 7 AEK Grasshopper | Austin 749cc S4 | B |
| 57 | 750 | (United Kingdom) Austin Motor Co. | (United Kingdom) Elsie Wisdom (Canada) Kay Petre | Austin 7 AEK Grasshopper | Austin 749cc S4 | |
| 58 | 750 | (United Kingdom) Austin Motor Co. | (United Kingdom) Charles Dodson (United Kingdom) Donald Barnes | Austin 7 AEK Grasshopper | Austin 749cc S4 | |
| 59 | 750 | (United Kingdom) J. Carr (private entrant) | (United Kingdom) John Carr (United Kingdom) John Barbour | Austin 7 AEK Grasshopper | Austin 749cc S4 | B |
| 60 | 750 | (United Kingdom) R. Marsh (private entrant) | | Austin 7 AEK Grasshopper | Austin 749cc S4 | B |
Sources:

- Note *: equivalent class for supercharging, with x1.6 modifier to engine capacity.

== Disruption and cancellation ==
Throughout the mid-1930s, France had been undergoing major economic and political upheaval – as had much of Europe, as opinions became more polarised to fascist and communist groups. Unemployment, inflation, class inequality and military friction with Germany all contributed to the violent unrest. In the general election in May, it was the popular Front coalition of leftist parties that swept into power under Léon Blum. The second mass general strike occurred on 26 May to pressure the new government to pass sweeping reforms. Over two million workers from all over the country, including from the automobile factories, walked off the job for better work conditions. The strikes spread until five million workers were involved. However, there were no major riots. Ettore Bugatti was shut out of his own factory at Molsheim and the new car for the ACF could not be readied in time for Le Mans. At the occupied Renault plant there were 25,000 strikers who were kept in high spirits by a fine Senegalese men's choir.

By the time the government was able to negotiate a settlement it was 7th June. This was only three days before the nominal start of race-scrutineering. Faced with fuel shortages and the prospect that many entrants, and spectators, would be unable to get transport, accommodation or even food for the event, the ACO therefore announced that the race would be postponed. There was also the issue of having sufficient workers to prepare the public roads used for the circuit and getting officials and marshals to run the event.

They approached the AIACR with several rescheduled dates – the following weekend, and the first weekend of August. However, both weekends were vetoed by the Royal Automobile Club (RAC) who had their own "international" (albeit minor) events on at the same times. The AIACR was swayed by the British group and blocked the submissions. Without any other potential options, the ACO officially cancelled the Le Mans race on 23rd June. Georges Durand, General-Secretary of the ACO, wrote:

"I know that we have many friends in neighbouring countries who will be filled with astonishment and indignation by this setback for the 24 Hours and will draw the conclusion that things are going badly for France. It takes little more to compromise the reputation of a people in the opinion of foreigners and to alienate sympathy."

The French Grand Prix was held just five days later, run to the new formula. Raymond Sommer and Jean-Pierre Wimille won the 8-hour race with the new Bugatti Type 57G ahead of four Delahayes. In mid-July, Spain erupted in civil war, and abruptly motorsport was not important for an anxious and nervous Europe. The new French works teams would have to wait a year to test themselves against the proven experience of the Alfa Romeo and Lagonda privateers.
