= Riley Sprite =

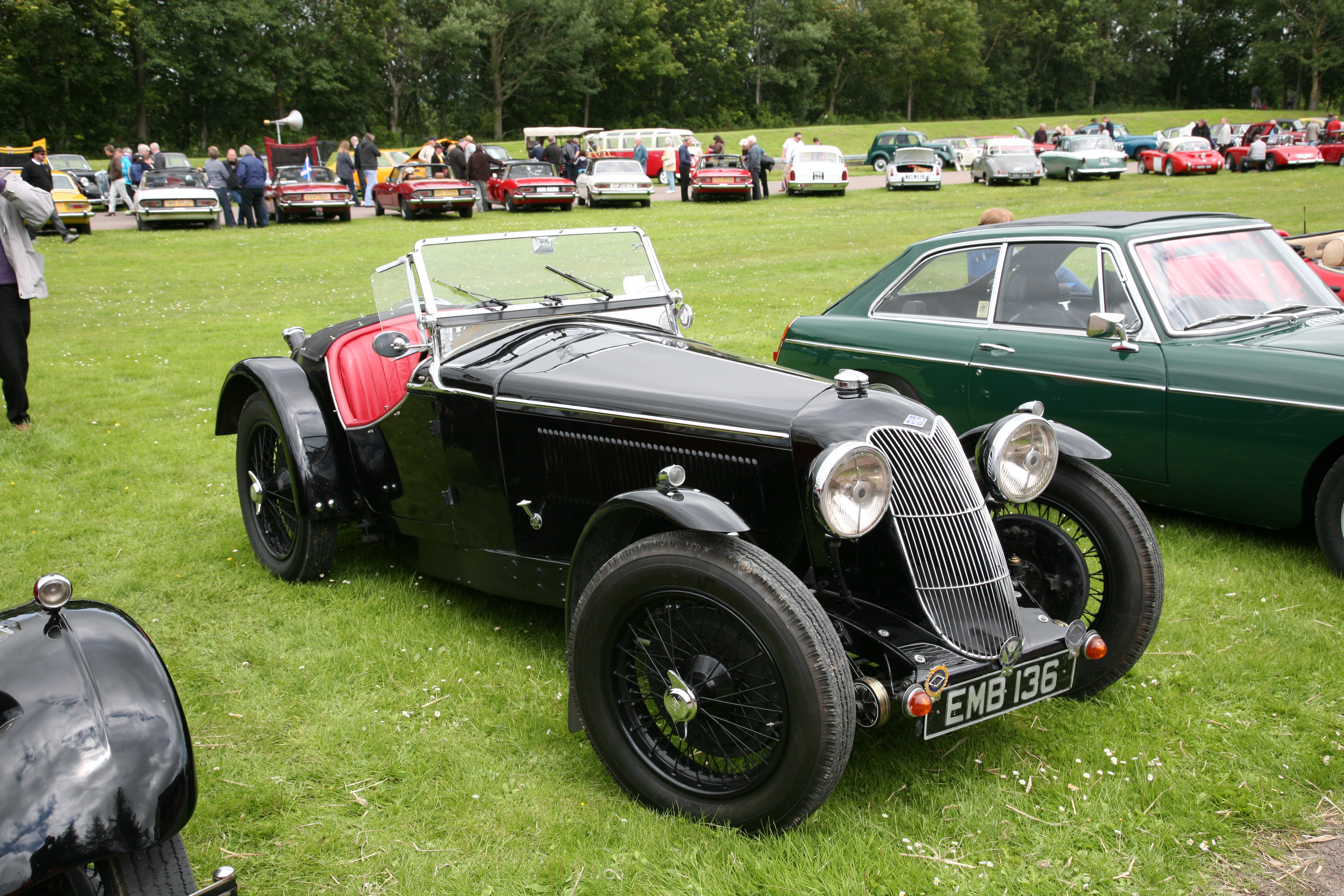
1938 Riley Sprite

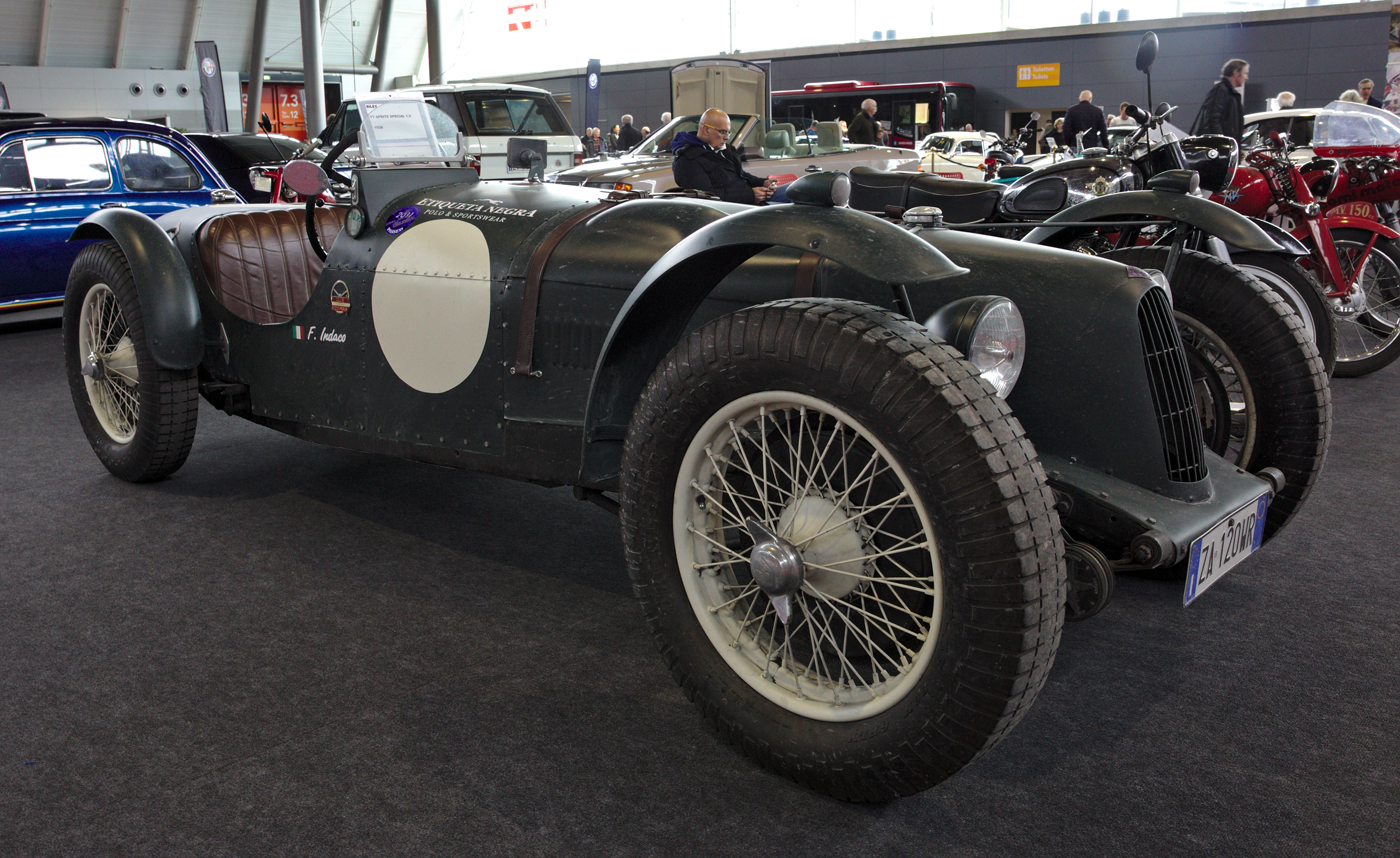
1936 Riley TT Sprite Special 1.5

The Riley Sprite is a two-seater open sports car model produced by Riley Motors from 1935 to 1938. It followed on from the company's Imp and MPH sports cars. The Sprite was mostly built with 4 cylinder engines, although alternatively a 6 cylinder engine was available. The chassis was based on that of the preceding 'MPH' model. Its racing success (especially in the form of the Riley T.T. Sprite model) led to the adoption of 'Sprite' as a designation for the top-end sportier model in the Riley Kestrel saloon car range of the time.
