= Healey Silverstone =

British sports car of the late 1940s and early 1950s

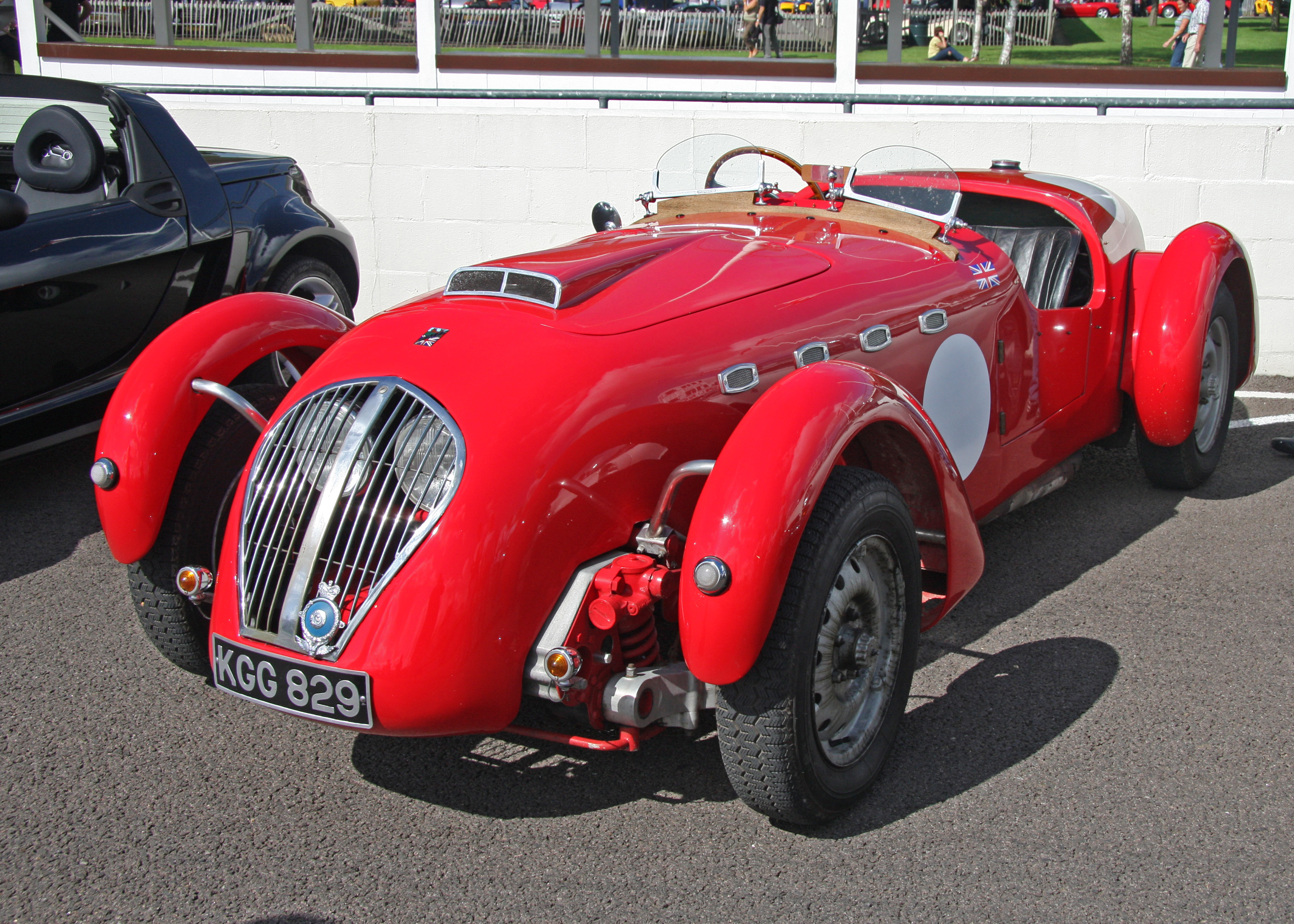

Overview
- Manufacturer: Donald Healey Motor Company
- Production: July 1949 – September 1950
- Designer: Len Hodges

Body and chassis
- Class: Sports car
- Body style: Roadster
- Layout: F/R

Powertrain
- Engine: 2.4 L Riley I4
- Transmission: Four-speed manual

Dimensions
- Wheelbase: 102 in (2,591 mm)
- Length: 168 in (4,267 mm)
- Width: 63 in (1,600 mm)
- Kerb weight: 18.5 long cwt (2,072 lb; 940 kg)

Chronology
- Predecessor: Healey Westland; Healey Abbott; Healey Sportmobile; Healey X 1/Red Bug
- Successor: Nash-Healey; Alvis-Healey

The Healey Silverstone is an open, two-seat sports car produced by the Donald Healey Motor Company beginning in 1949. It is named for the Silverstone Circuit racetrack, where it appeared on its second competition outing. The car has a narrow roadster body and cycle wings. Designed as a dual purpose car for both road and track, the Silverstone became popular in club racing.

== History ==
Donald Healey was a British aircraft and automobile engineer who became a rally driver, piloting a variety of marques starting with a Buick in 1921 and proceeding through Triumph and Invicta, to Riley Motor in 1933. In 1934 he became Technical Director for the Triumph Motor Company, responsible for the design of all Triumph cars until 1939, when the company was liquidated. During the early part of World War II (WWII) Healey remained at the Triumph factory designing aero engine carburettors. He later moved to Humber Limited, where he worked on their military vehicles. During the war years Healey began planning a high performance car, envisioned as a revival of the Triumph, for the post-war market.

His conception of this future car was influenced by discussions with two people he met at Humber. Benjamin Bowden was an engineer and artist who specialised in body design. Bowden spent time at Farina, and did designs such as the 1949 Veritas Scorpion, but may be best known as the designer of the Spacelander bicycle. A.C. Sampietro, known as 'Sammy', was an engineer who had worked for Alfa Romeo and Maserati in his native Italy and then with Thomson & Taylor and Talbot before applying his skills as a chassis designer to Healey's project. Sampietro went on to design a new cylinder head for the Nash inline six engine, and later emigrated to the United States, where he was hired by Willys, and for whom he designed the single overhead camshaft six cylinder Jeep Tornado engine. After the war, while still working at Humber, Healey, Bowden and Sampietro began planning to put their new sports car into production. They formed the Donald Healey Motor Company in February 1946 in Warwick, England. The original principals were later joined by James Watt, with whom Healey had worked at Triumph, and later still by Healey's son Geoff.

Sampietro designed the chassis that became the basis for the company's subsequent cars, collectively called the Warwick Healeys. The company's earlier cars used a curvaceous design by Bowden, with open top cars' bodywork made by Westland, and saloon models' by Elliot. These were followed by a somewhat awkward looking model called the Sportmobile built on a revised B-Type chassis.

In 1948 the British government doubled the purchase tax rate on automobiles costing over £1000 (£31,437 in 2025 pounds), raising it from 33.33% to 66.66%. Healey realised this created a market for a modestly priced high performance car. The result was the Healey Silverstone, which was initially priced at £975.

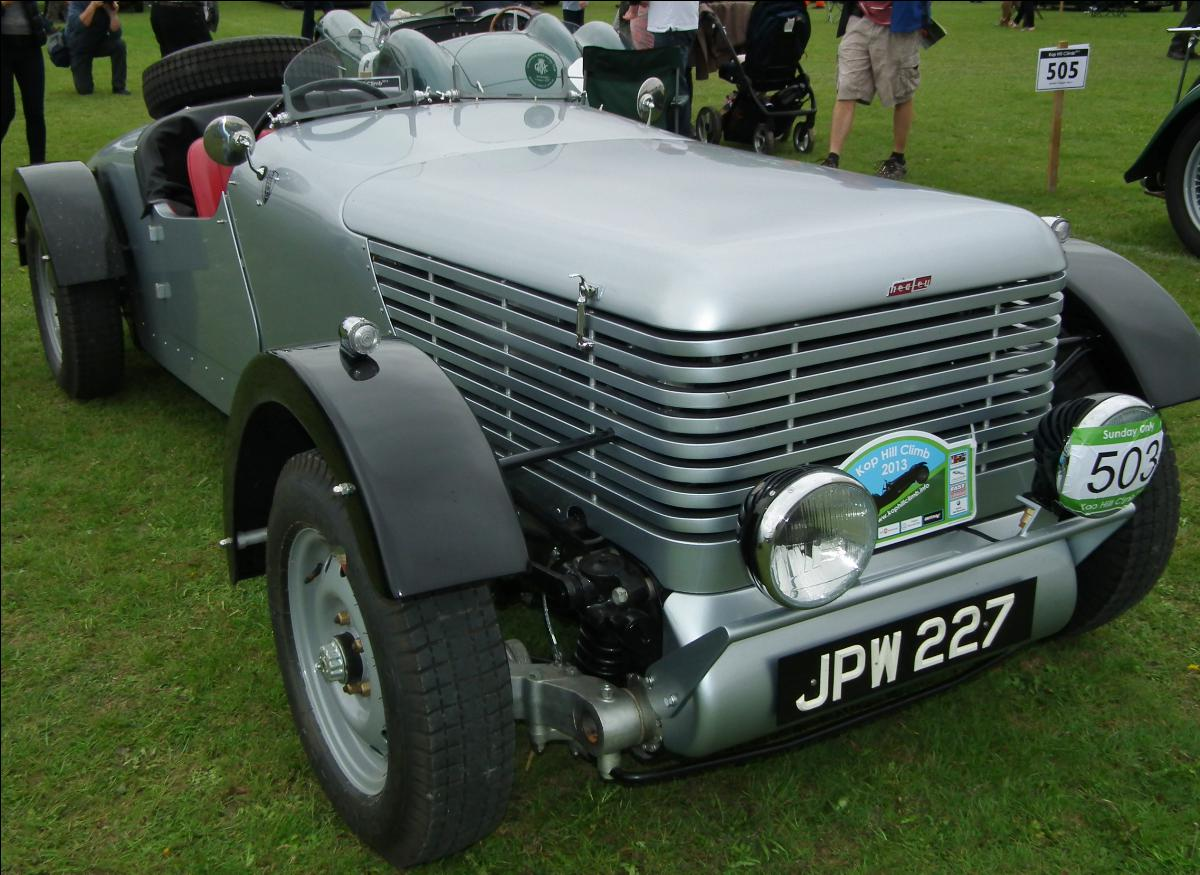
Healey Duncan Drone

The Silverstone was not the first car to target this market. In 1947 a sportscar, built on a Healey chassis and with the same powertrain, was launched by coachbuilder Duncan Industries. Called the Healey Duncan Drone, and nicknamed the Spiv, this car had an extremely simple roadster body with minimal equipment. The Drone sold for under £1000, and the buyer could drive it as delivered, or have the chassis rebodied after purchase in a more elaborate style.

Healey themselves had earlier built a similar car. This project was headed by Geoff Healey and resulted in the prototype Healey X 1, nicknamed the Red Bug and later called the Dryden Special. Built on a Healey chassis, X 1 was a narrow roadster with cycle wings. Power came originally from a 2.4 L Riley four cylinder engine, but the displacement was said to have been reduced to 2.0 L at some point. Some reports also mention the car as having a Ford flathead V8 engine for a time. The Silverstone drew inspiration from the Red Bug.

The car that served as the official Silverstone prototype was designated X 2, registered as JAC 100. It is at times incorrectly described as later receiving the designation "D 1" as the first production Silverstone.

Victor Leverett of Triumph suggested to Healey that he use the Riley engine in his new car. Healey had a long history with Riley going back to 1924. He had owned Rileys, prepped cars for their racing team, and become a friend of Victor Riley. Other parts of the Silverstone's powertrain are also sourced from Riley Motor's cars. Miles Thomas at Nuffield agreed to supply the parts to Healey.

The Healey Silverstone became so popular that several instances of other Warwick Healey cars were rebodied as Silverstone conversions.

== Features ==
=== Body and chassis ===
The Silverstone's roadster body was designed by Len Hodges. Hodges rounded the back of the car and pulled it out slightly from the sides, and cut a slot out of the rear to house the spare wheel and tyre, which protrudes from the rear of the car and acts as a bumper. The car's windscreen can be partially retracted into the scuttle. On most examples the headlamps are mounted behind the grille to improve aerodynamics.

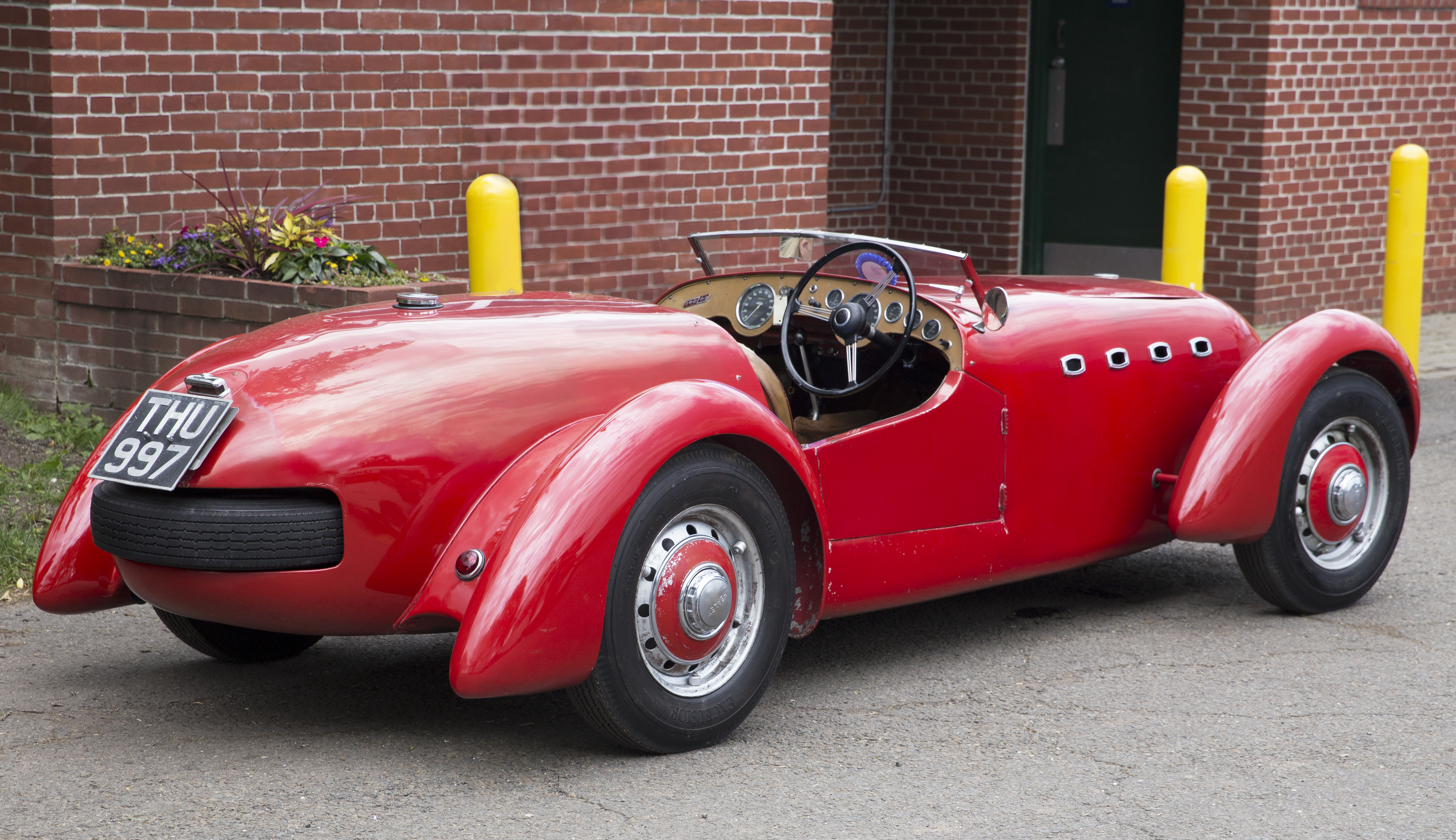
Rear view; D-type chassis #3

The body was produced in light alloy for Healey by Abbey Panel and Sheet Metal Co., Ltd. of Coventry, at a cost of £150 per copy. The Silverstone was the first Healey to use a tubular metal structure to support the body, instead of the timber framework used on earlier cars.

The body is mounted on a revision of the original Healey chassis drawn up by Sampietro in 1945. This is a ladder chassis, with central cruciform bracing. The main side members were made of an upper "Top hat" steel rail with a plate added to close the bottom. The chassis was shortened for use in the Silverstone by removing the rear extensions, but the car has the same wheelbase as the Westland and Abbott Healeys.

The Silverstone used two different versions of the Healey chassis: the original 1949 D-Type, and the later E-Type. The E-Type chassis, released in April 1950, was wider and therefore more comfortable than the earlier D-Type. The D-Type's bucket seats were replaced by a bench in E-Type cars, which also added a bonnet scoop on the top of the engine cover, and a larger windscreen.

The complete car weighs 18.5 long cwt (2,072 lb; 940 kg).

=== Suspension and running gear ===
The Silverstone's front suspension is Healey's signature trailing arm system with light alloy arms, designed by Sampietro. The springs are coils, with lever arm dampers. An anti-roll bar is also fitted in the front.

The rear suspension uses more Riley parts, including a torque tube driveline and live axle. The axle is located by radius rods and a Panhard rod, and suspended on coil springs and Woodhead-Monroe telescopic dampers.

=== Engine and transmission ===
The engine in the Silverstone is the Riley "Big Four" inline four cylinder engine. Introduced in 1937, it shared design elements with Riley engines going back through the Riley 12/4 of 1935, to 1926 and the Riley 9. Among those features were twin camshafts mounted high in the engine block, one on either side, driving overhead valves through short pushrods and rocker arms, with two valves per cylinder at a 90° included angle in hemispherical combustion chambers. Bore and stroke for the "Big Four" are 80.5 mm × 120 mm (3.2 in × 4.7 in), for a total displacement of 2,443 cc (149.1 cu in). The Silverstone received a manifold of Healey's own design and two SU H4 carburettors, raising power output from the original 90 hp (67 kW) to 104 hp (78 kW). The engine is mated to a four speed Riley manual transmission. In the Silverstone the engine is mounted 8 in (20 cm) further back in the chassis than it was in the earlier Healeys.

Promotional material from Healey indicated that the company offered a Wade Ventor supercharger as a factory installed option. To make room for the supercharger protruding from the front of the engine, the headlamps on these cars were moved to outside of the body.

In another search for more power for the Silverstone, Sampietro did a preliminary design for a narrow-angle V8 engine with a wet linered, light alloy cylinder block, but the cost to produce it was prohibitive, and the project was abandoned. This led Healey to look for a source of an engine with greater power potential.

== Production ==
The Silverstone was hand-built at Healey's factory in Lower Cape, Warwick, England. 105 were produced, not including prototypes; 51 D-Types and 54 E-Types. Production ended in September 1950.

== Successors ==
=== Nash-Healey ===
In December 1949 Donald Healey sailed for America aboard the RMS Queen Elizabeth, hoping to persuade General Motors to provide him with a supply of Cadillac's new 331 cu in (5.4 L) V8 engine. On the trip he happened to meet George W. Mason, president of the Nash-Kelvinator Corporation. Hearing of Healey's plan, and anticipating GM's reply, Mason told Healey to contact him if the negotiations were unsuccessful. When GM declined to supply the hoped-for engine, Healey contacted Mason, and work began on development of the Nash-Healey sportscar.

The car is built on a further evolution of the Healey chassis, called the N-Type. It is described by some as a modified Silverstone chassis, but with the original cruciform bracing deleted and the chassis reinforced by strengthening the side members. The cars are capable of seating three abreast, having a full-width bench seat with a cutout in some to clear the shift lever, and in others to denote the drivers location.

Instead of the Riley-based powertrain, the Nash-Healey used the same overhead valve inline six engine used in the Nash Ambassador. The engine was backed by a 3-speed manual transmission and a Borg Warner overdrive. The car's torque tube and rear axle were also supplied by Nash.

The Nash-Healey went through two generations. The first instance is fitted with an enveloping ponton body designed by Hodges and produced by Panelcraft Sheet Metal of Birmingham, England, trimmed with a Nash grille. The engine in this model displaced 235 cu in (3.9 L). 104 of these cars were built.

Nash then asked Italian carrozzeria Pinin Farina to restyle the car, which resulted in the Nash-Healey Farina Coupe and Roadster of 1952. In 1953 this car received a larger engine of 253 cu in (4.1 L). 402 of this second generation Nash-Healey were built.

=== Alvis-Healey ===
In Britain, Healey sold a model with Hodges' original Nash-Healey bodywork as the Healey Sports Convertible. The Nash grille was replaced by another piece, the power bulge in the bonnet was deleted, and other minor features such as a scuttle vent, fog lamps, and revised wheel plates, were added.

Power for this version came from a 3.0 L (183 cu in) inline six cylinder engine from the Alvis TB 21 fed by two SU carburettors. Built on a G-Type chassis, it is commonly called the Alvis-Healey.

The Alvis-Healey also used the clutch and transmission from Alvis, and replaced the Nash-Healey's torque tube rear drive with a rigid Salisbury axle suspended on coil springs and located by trailing links, with the drive reaching the rear axle via an open Hardy-Spicer driveshaft.

Approximately twenty-five examples were built.

== Alternate engine specials ==
=== Cadillac V8 ===
==== Cunningham Special ====
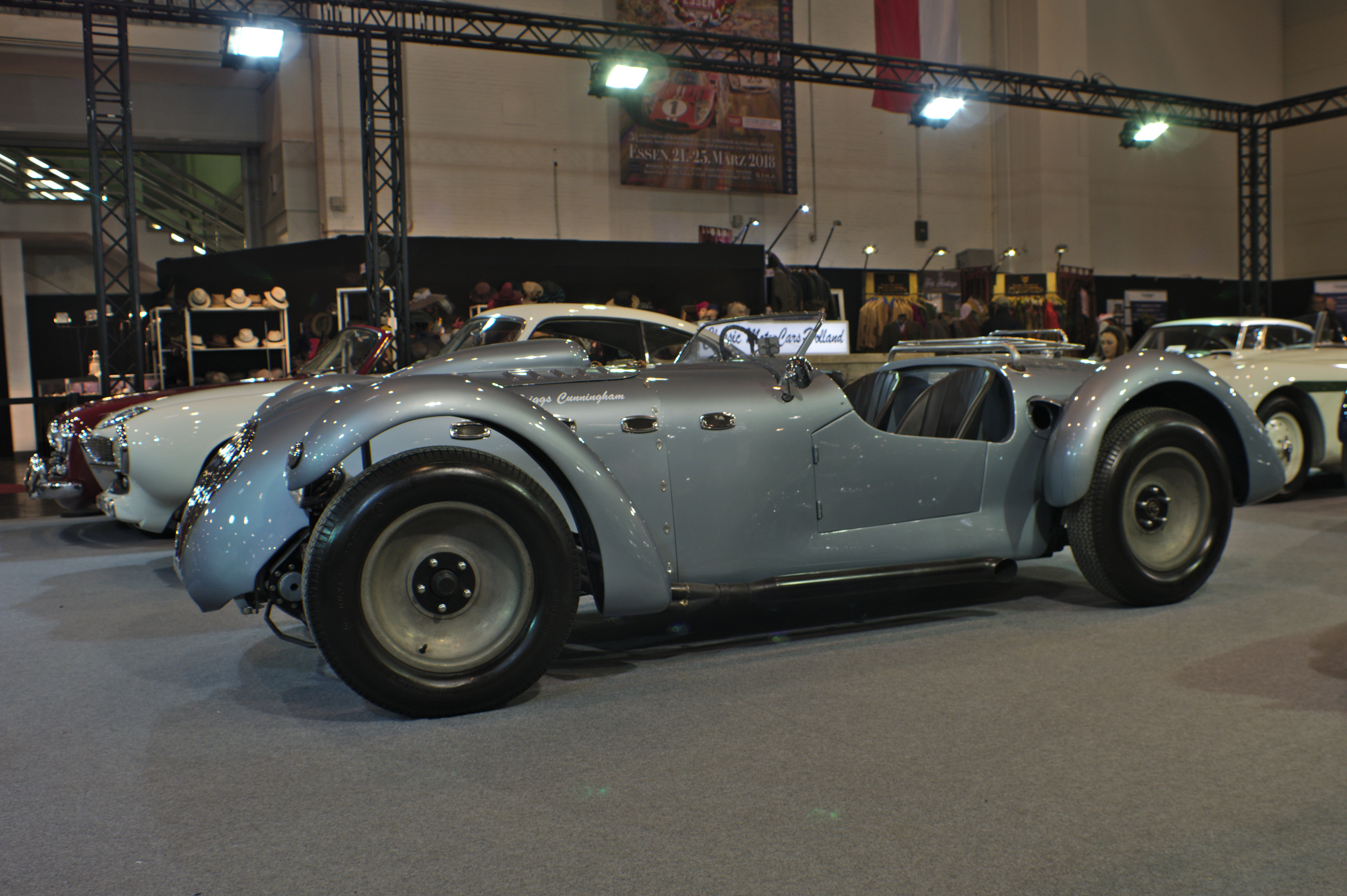
D15 Healey-Cadillac Special

In 1949 American sportsman Briggs Cunningham brought two Silverstones to the United States; chassis D9 and D15, the latter of which was bought engineless from the factory. In 1950, Cunningham began racing D15, after having installed one of Cadillac's new V8s. The engine was apparently one of two on loan from GM, the other going to Healey in Britain.

The car debuted at Palm Beach on 3 January 1950. Driven by Cunningham, it finished second. On 23 September the same year, it was driven by Cunningham again at Watkins Glen, and finished second.

The Cunningham Special also appeared at the 6 Hours of Sebring on 31 December 1950. Co-driven by Phil Walters and Bill Frick, it finished twelfth overall and third in class.

At the end of its racing career the Cadillac V8 was removed from D15 and returned to GM. An Oldsmobile engine was installed in its place, and the car was sold.

==== Healey X 4 ====
Healey received one of two Cadillac V8 engine loaned out by GM, the other going to Briggs Cunningham in the US for installation in chassis D15.

Chief Engineer Roger Menadue used the engine sent to Britain to build Healey's own Cadillac-powered Silverstone, designated X 4. The Cadillac V8 was mated to a powertrain consisting of a new transmission and rear axle from Ford. Development of this hybrid stopped when GM declined to supply engines to Healey.

The Cadillac engine was removed and returned to GM. X 4 then received a Nash inline six cylinder engine, and was later renamed X 5.

=== Jaguar XK inline 6 ===
==== Chassis D48 ====
Healey Silverstone chassis D48 was originally sold to Harry Mark Walker of Leicester, then passed through owners D.S. Boston and W.E.J. Allen before being bought by Alan J. Hancock in September 1959. Hancock undertook to replace the Riley "Big Four" four cylinder with a six-cylinder Jaguar XK engine. The original Riley four-speed gearbox was replaced by one from Moss Gear, and the live rear axle by a De Dion axle. D48 was purchased by Guy Griffiths in September 1964, who began a program of development to make the car competitive in hill climbs.

This engine swap is described as a not uncommon upgrade to Silverstones.

=== Nash inline 6 ===
==== Healey X 5 ====
The Healey X 5 was the prototype for the upcoming Nash-Healey, and was the result of the earlier X 4 having had its Cadillac V8 engine replaced by a Nash inline six cylinder engine. It is described as a Healey Silverstone chassis, adapted for the new drivetrain.

The car was entered in the 1950 Mille Miglia, with drivers Donald and Geoff Healey. With a new exhaust manifold and the head shaved to raise compression, it finished ninth in class and one-hundred seventy-seventh overall.

It was then raced in the 1950 24 Hours of Le Mans. As cars with cycle fenders had been banned from competing at Le Mans, the original Silverstone items were removed, and two full-length side pieces were added that gave the appearance of a full-width body. Driven by Duncan Hamilton and Tony Rolt, the car finished in fourth place overall.

== Motorsports ==
The Silverstone's debut race was the 1949 Coupe des Alpes. Driven by Donald Healey and Ian Appleyard, the car won its class and came second overall. Three Silverstones driven by Louis Chiron, Tony Rolt and Tommy Wisdom took part in the British Racing Drivers' Club international trophy meeting at the Silverstone circuit. The team won the Daily Express team award."

In 1951, Peter Riley and Bill Lamb piloted a Silverstone to a class win in the Liège–Rome–Liège rally.

Tommy Wisdom drove a Silverstone to a new world one hour speed record at Montlhéry, France in 1952.

== Technical data ==
Healey Silverstone	Detail
Engine:	Riley "Big Four" Inline-four engine
Bore × Stroke:	80.5 mm × 120 mm (3.2 in × 4.7 in)
Displacement:	2,443 cc (149.1 cu in)
Compression ratio:	6.9:1
Maximum power:	104 bhp (78 kW) at 4500 rpm
Maximum torque:	132 ft⋅lb (179 N⋅m) at 3000 rpm
Valvetrain:	Dual high-mounted cams in block, pushrods, rocker arms, 2 overhead valves per cylinder
Induction:	2 × SU H4 carburettors
Cooling:	Water-cooled
Transmission:	4-speed manual
Clutch:	Borg & Beck 10 in (254 mm) single plate
Steering:	Marles steering gear
Brakes f/r:	Lockheed 11 in × 1.75 in (279 mm × 44 mm) twin leading shoe / 10 in × 1.75 in (254 mm × 44 mm)
Suspension front:	Trailing arms, coil springs, hydraulic lever arm dampers, anti-roll bar
Suspension rear:	Torque tube, live axle, radius rods, coil springs, telescopic dampers, Panhard rod
Body/Chassis:	Light alloy body on steel chassis
Track f/r:	54 / 53 in (1,372 / 1,346 mm)
Wheelbase:	102 in (2,591 mm)
Tyres f/r:	Dunlop 5.50 × 15 or 5.75 × 15
Length; Width; Height:	168 in (4,267 mm); 63 in (1,600 mm); 54 in (1,372 mm)
Weight:	18.5 long cwt (2,072 lb; 940 kg)
Maximum speed:	110 mph (177 km/h)
Acceleration:	0–60 mph (0–97 km/h) in 7 seconds

== Gallery ==
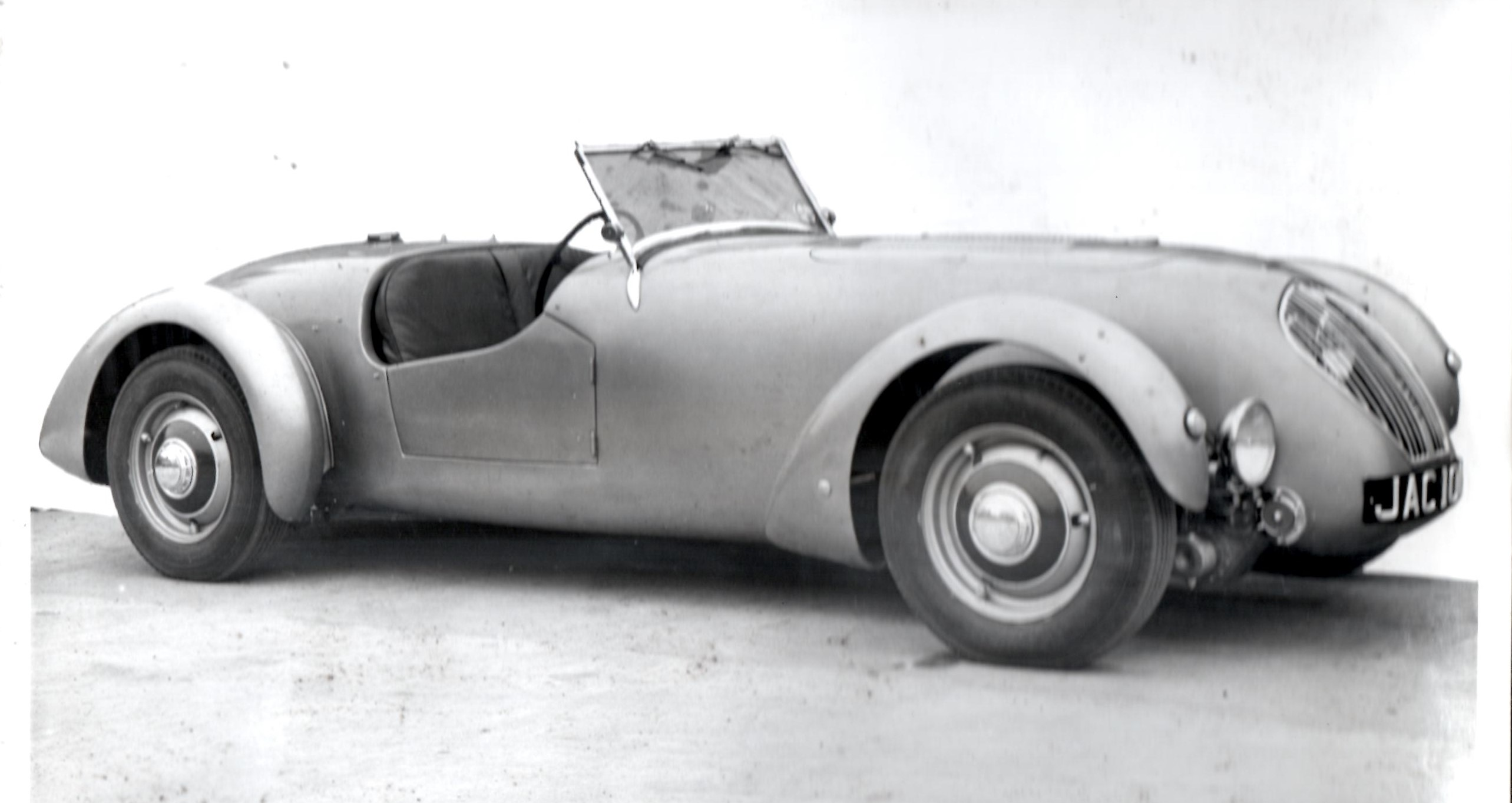
Early model

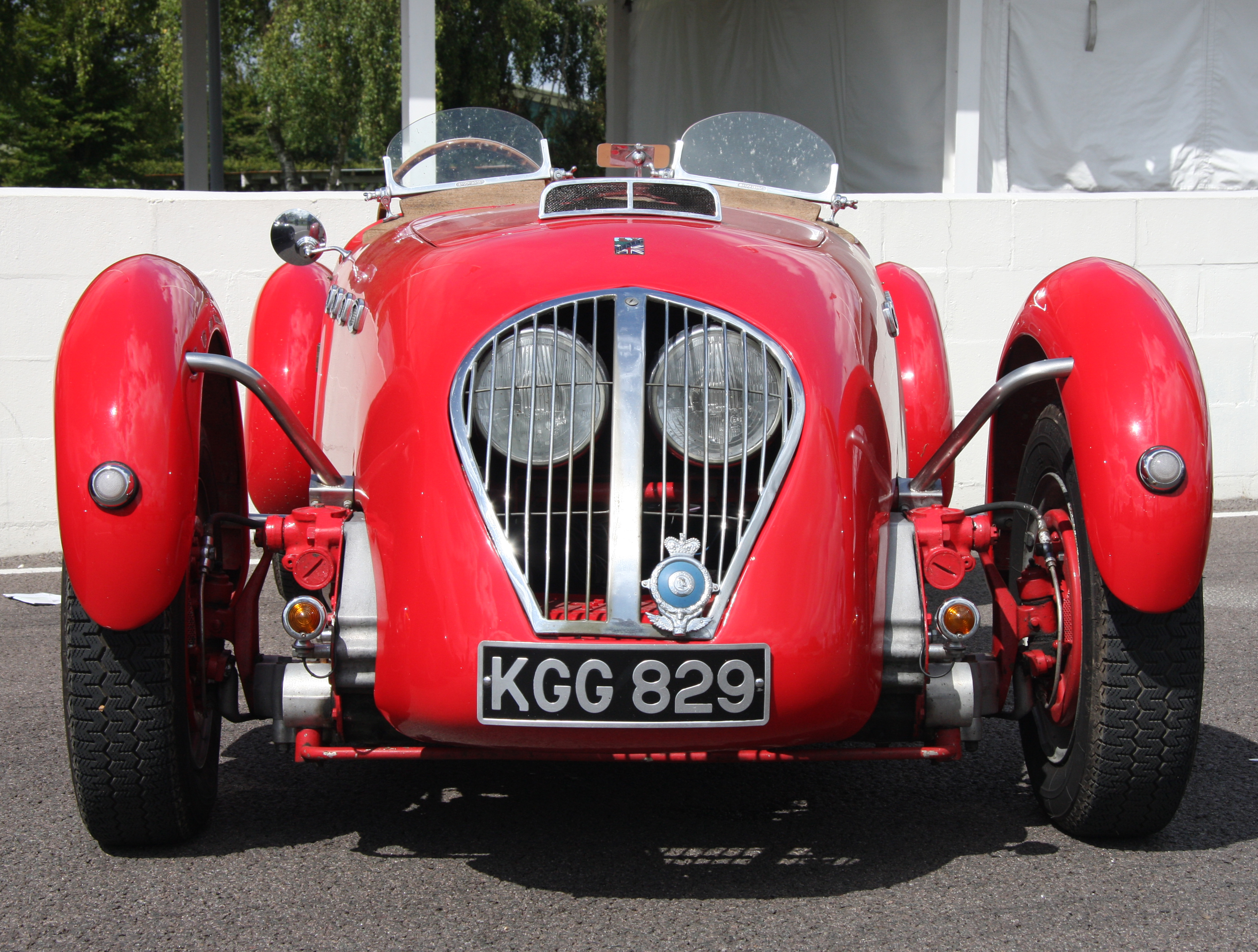
Front view

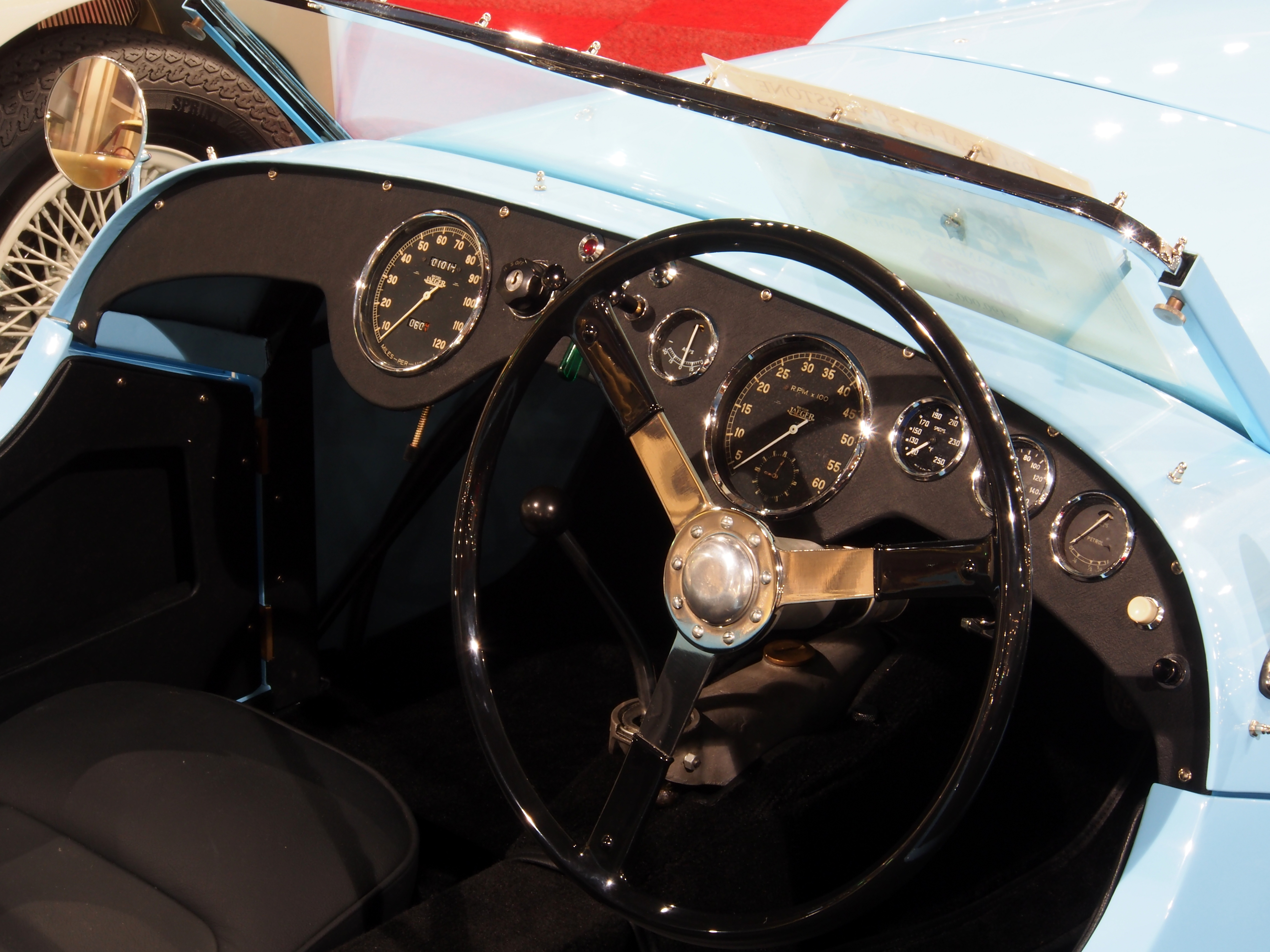
1950 fascia

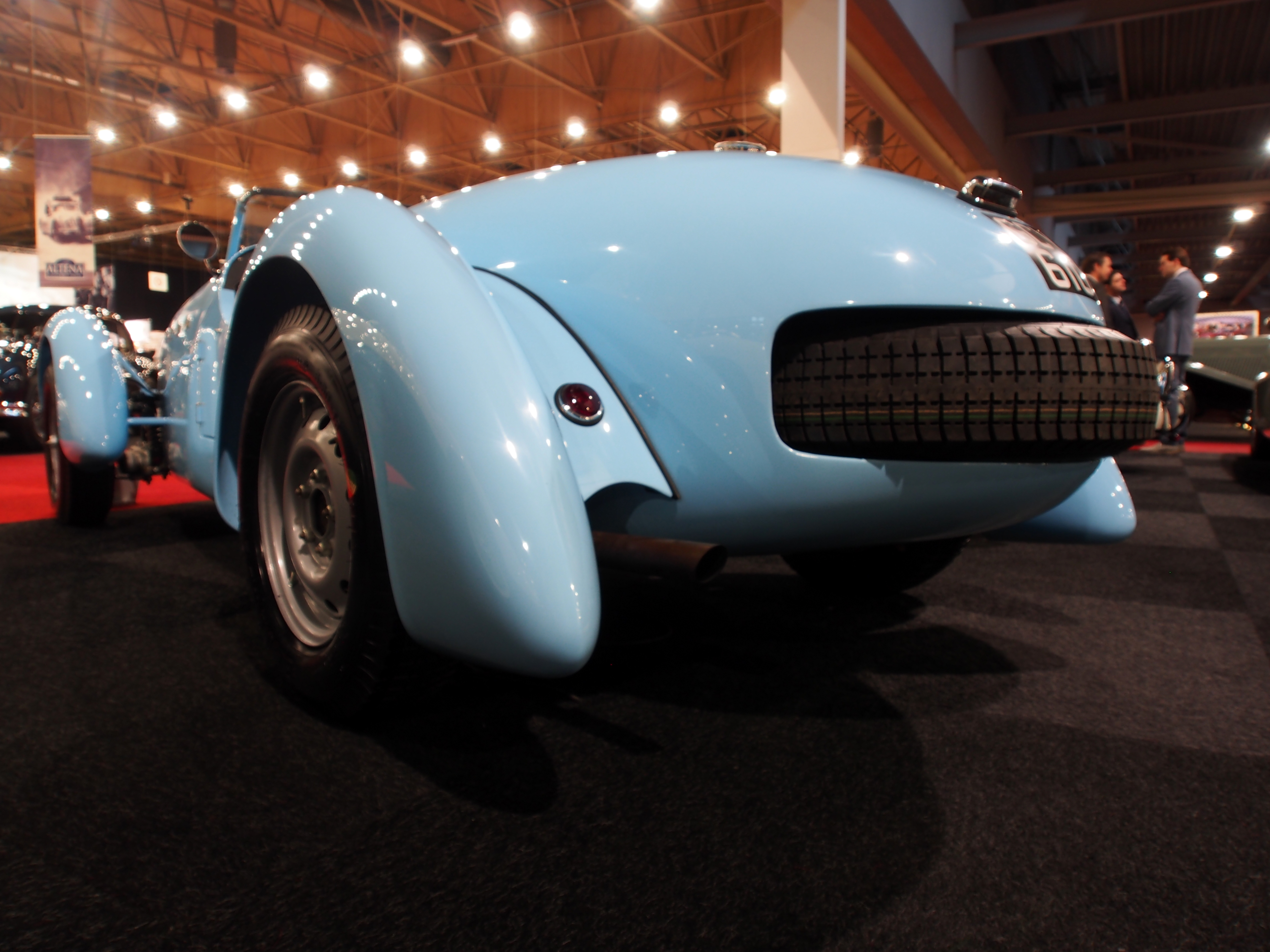
Spare tyre placement

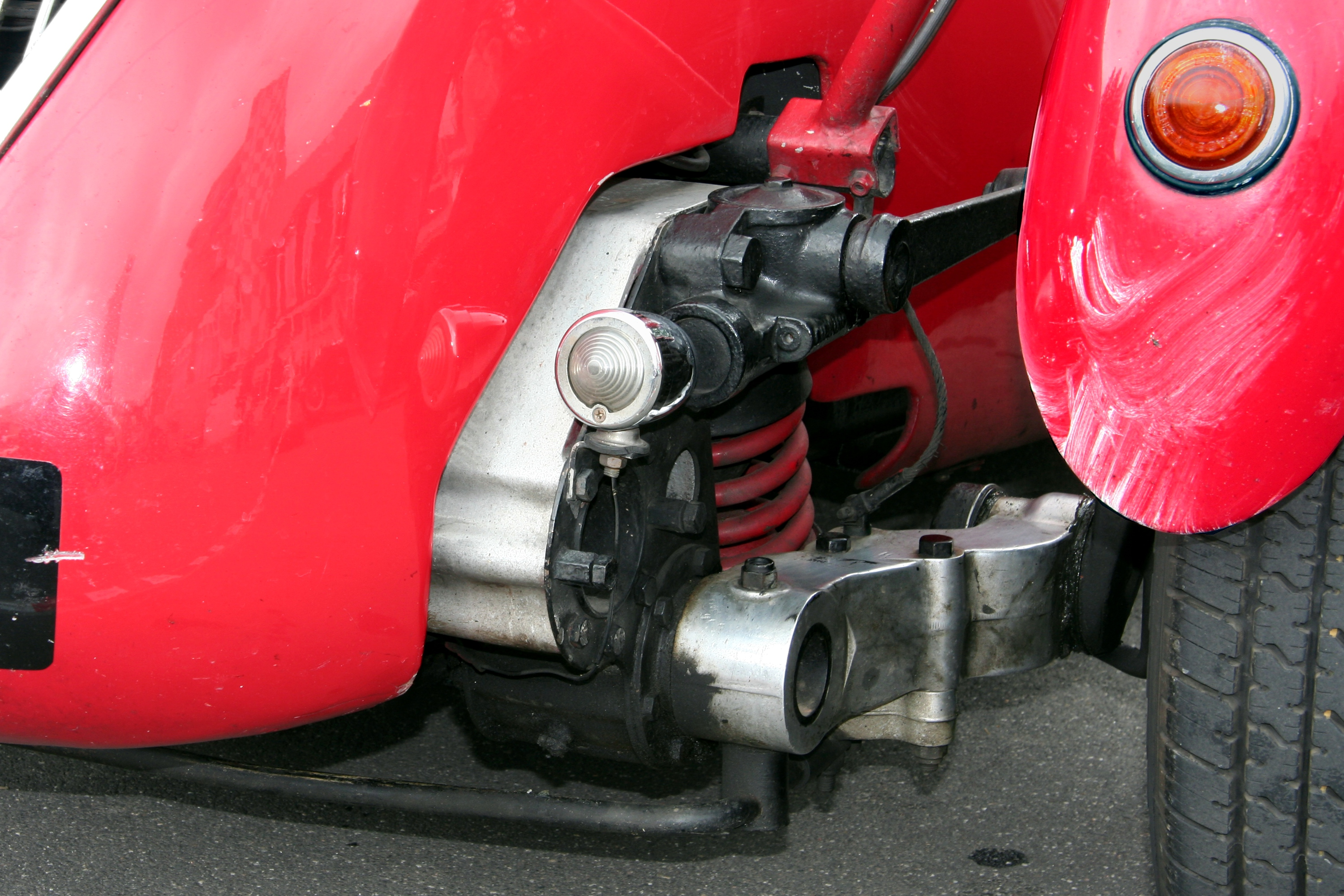
Front suspension

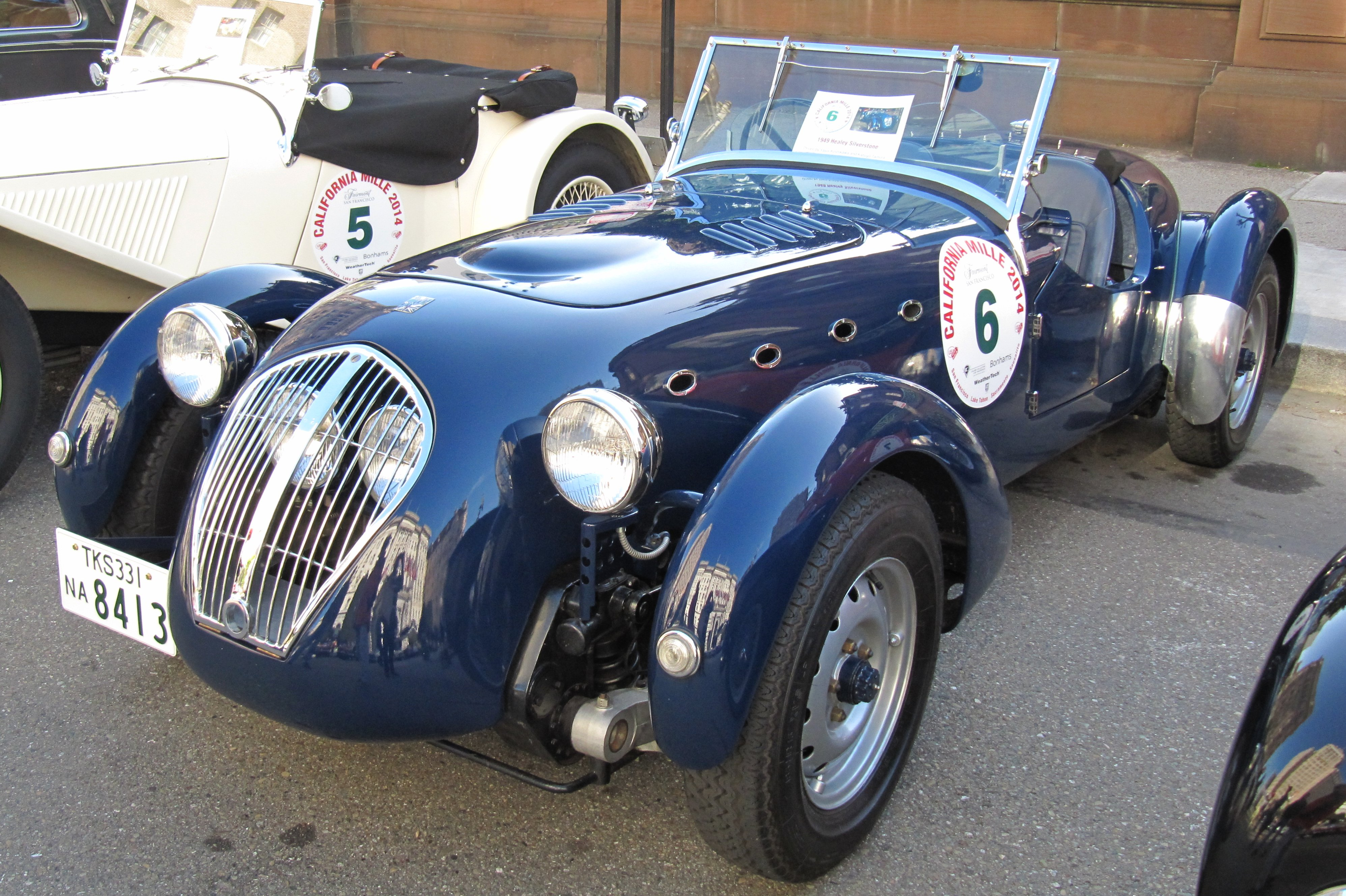
Externally-mounted headlamps
