= Tommy Wisdom =

British motoring correspondent for the Daily Herald and racing driver

- Born: Tommy Henry Wisdom; 16 February 1906; Brighton, Sussex, England
- Died: 12 November 1972 (aged 66); Birmingham, England
- Occupations: motoring correspondent for the Daily Herald, racing driver
- Spouse: Elsie Mary Wisdom
- Children: Ann Wisdom

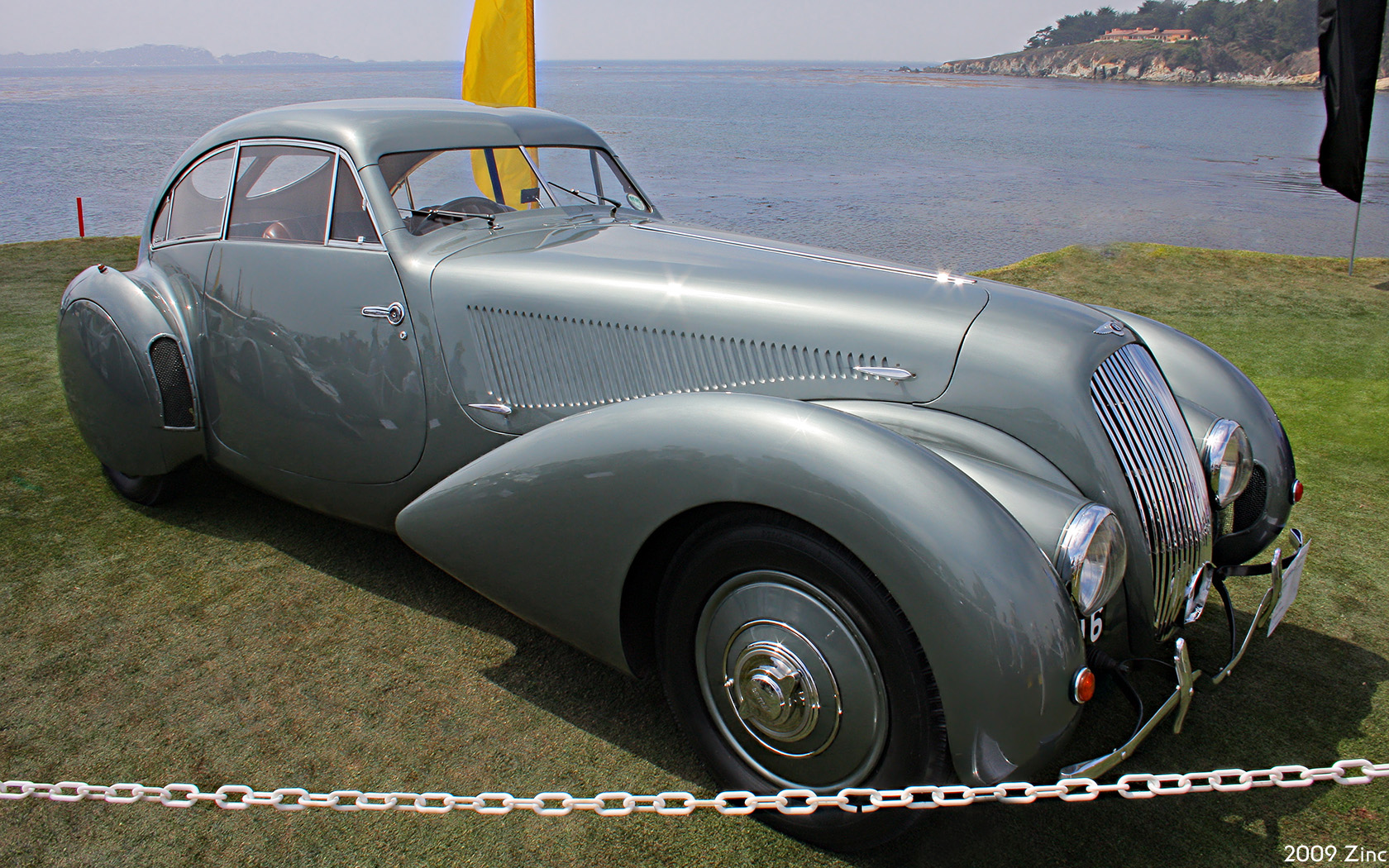
1939 Bentley 4.25 Litre Embiricos Pourtout Coupé that Wisdom shared with its owner H.S.F. Hay in the 1949 24 Hours of Le Mans.

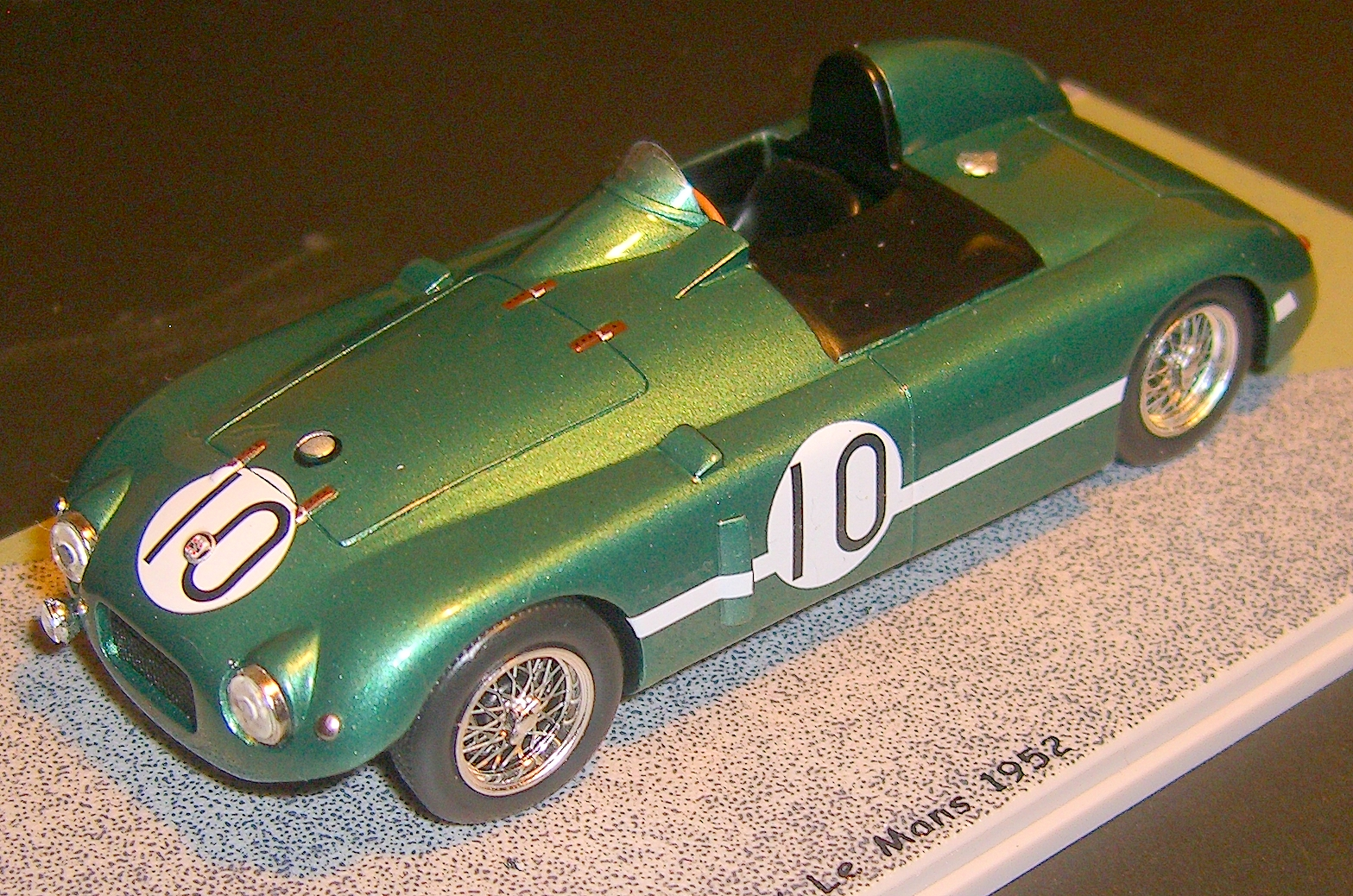
Model of the factory-entered Nash-Healey that Wisdom shared with Leslie Johnson in the 1952 24 Hours of Le Mans.

Thomas Henry Wisdom (16 February 1906 – 12 November 1972) was a British motoring correspondent for the Daily Herald. He was also a racing driver who took part in numerous races and rallies.

Wisdom was born in Brighton. His wife Elsie (known as "Bill") was also a racing driver, and their daughter Ann Wisdom competed in International rallies, most notably as Pat Moss's co-driver.

Tommy Wisdom, died in Birmingham, aged 66.

== Racing, rallying and record-breaking ==
Wisdom specialised in endurance events and entered 52 sports car races in 33 years, including 12 Le Mans 24-hour races, 10 Mille Miglias and 4 Targa Florios. He was a class winner in the Mille Miglia in 1949, 1952 and 1957, and at Le Mans in 1950 and 1952. In 1950 he lent his Jaguar XK120 to Stirling Moss for the RAC Tourist Trophy, which brought Moss his first major international race victory.

Cars that Wisdom raced included Singer, Riley, MG, Jaguar, Aston Martin, Bristol, Nash-Healey, Austin-Healey, Jowett and Bentley, and among his co-drivers were Jack Fairman, Leslie Johnson, and Graham Whitehead.

An experienced rally driver, he competed in the Monte Carlo Rally 23 times.

In 1959 he was a member of the three-driver BMC team whose EX-219 streamliner, a purpose-built experimental Austin-Healey Sprite, broke 12 speed records at Bonneville Salt Flats. The car averaged 138.75 mph (223.30 km/h) for 12 hours.

== Sports car racing results ==
No.	Date	Race	Entrant	Car	Teammate(s)	Result
1	22 August 1931	RAC Tourist Trophy	"L.A. Cushman"	Invicta S	"J. Chilton"; Donald Healey; Dudley Froy	19th
2	20 August 1932	RAC Tourist Trophy	Elsie Wisdom	Riley Brooklands 9	Sammy Newsome	DNF
3	16 September 1933	500 Miles of Brooklands	Alan Hess	MG L Type	Alan Hess	DNF
4	17 June 1934	1934 24 Hours of Le Mans	Singer Motors	Singer Nine Le Mans	John Donald Barnes	18th
5	22 September 1934	500 Miles of Brooklands	Capt. G.E.T. Eyston	MG K3	Bill Everitt	4th
6	16 June 1935	1935 24 Hours of Le Mans	Singer Motors	Singer Nine Le Mans	John Donald Barnes	DNF
7	7 September 1935	RAC Tourist Trophy	Peter Donkin	Aston Martin Ulster	Peter Donkin	DNS
8	21 September 1935	500 Miles of Brooklands	"Evans"	MG R-Type	"A.L. Phipps"	NC
9	28 June 1936	Grand Prix de l'ACF	D.M.K. Marendaz	Marendaz Special	Earl Howe	25th
10	5 September 1936	RAC Tourist Trophy	Arthur Dobson	Riley TT Sprite	Arthur Dobson	DNS
11	19 September 1936	500 Miles of Brooklands	"Dixon"	Riley 6	"G. Daybell"	6th
12	4 April 1937	Mille Miglia		MG SA	Elsie Wisdom	DNF
13	24 July 1937	12 Hours of Donington	Team Autosports	Singer Nine Le Mans	Frank Stanley Barnes; Alf Langley	DNA
14	4 September 1937	RAC Tourist Trophy	Singer Motors	Singer Nine Le Mans	none	DNF
15	19 June 1938	1938 24 Hours of Le Mans	Team Autosports	Singer Nine Le Mans	John Donald Barnes	DNF
16	3 September 1938	RAC Tourist Trophy	Frank Stanley Barnes	Singer	none	26th
17	18 June 1939	1939 24 Hours of Le Mans	Archie Scott Brown	Singer Nine Le Mans	Archie Scott	DNF
18	11 July 1948	Spa 24 Hours		Healey	Nick Haines	8th
19	12 September 1948	24 Hours of Paris		Healey	Norman Black	DNF
20	24 April 1949	Mille Miglia		Healey 2400 Westland	Geoffrey Healey	10th (1st in class)
21	26 June 1949	1949 24 Hours of Le Mans	"H.S.F. Hay"	Bentley 4 1/4 Paulin	"H.S.F. Hay" "Mrs. Hay"	6th
22	10 July 1949	Spa 24 Hours	Jowett	Jowett Javelin	Anthony Hulme	9th
23	20 August 1949	Silverstone International	Donald Healey	Healey Silverstone	none	17th
24	3 January 1950	Palm Beach		Healey Silverstone	"C. Swenson"	22nd
25	2 April 1950	Targa Florio		Healey Silverstone	Anthony Hulme	15th
26	23 April 1950	Mille Miglia	Jaguar Cars	Jaguar XK120	Anthony Hulme	DNF
27	18 June 1950	Circuito do Porto		Jaguar XK120		3rd
28	25 June 1950	1950 24 Hours of Le Mans	Jowett	Jowett Jupiter	Tommy Wise	16th (1st in class)
29	26 August 1950	Silverstone International	Tom Wisdom	Jaguar XK120	none	7th
30	16 September 1950	RAC Tourist Trophy	Jowett	Jowett Jupiter	none	DNF
31	29 April 1951	Mille Miglia	Tommy Wisdom	Aston Martin DB2	Anthony Hulme	11th
32	5 May 1951	International Production Car Race	T.H. Wisdom	Jaguar XK120	none	9th
33	17 June 1951	1951 Portuguese Grand Prix		Jaguar XK120		DNF
34	23 June 1951	1951 24 Hours of Le Mans	Jowett	Jowett Jupiter	Tommy Wise	DNF
35	15 September 1951	RAC Tourist Trophy	Jaguar Cars	Jaguar C-Type	Stirling Moss	DNS
36	15 September 1951	RAC Tourist Trophy	Jowett Cars	Jowett Jupiter	none	NC
37	4 May 1952	Mille Miglia	Aston Martin	Aston Martin DB2	Fred Lown	12th (1st in class)
38	2 June 1952	1952 Monaco Grand Prix	Tommy Wisdom	Jaguar C-Type	none	6th
39	15 June 1952	1952 24 Hours of Le Mans	Healey	Nash-Healey	Leslie Johnson	3rd (1st in class)
40	26 April 1953	1953 Mille Miglia	Aston Martin Lagonda Ltd.	Aston Martin DB2	Dave Halliwell; Peter Bolton	DNF
41	14 May 1953	Targa Florio	Jaguar Cars	Jaguar C-Type	none	17th
42	14 June 1953	1953 24 Hours of Le Mans	Bristol Aeroplane Co.	Bristol 450	Jack Fairman; Maurice Wilson; Graham Whitehead	DNF
43	7 March 1954	12 Hours of Sebring	Donald Healey Ltd.	Austin-Healey 100	Lance Macklin; George Huntoon; Thomas Johnson	DNS
44	2 May 1954	1954 Mille Miglia	Donald Healey	Austin-Healey 100	Mortimer Morris-Goodall	DNF
45	13 June 1954	1954 24 Hours of Le Mans	Bristol Aeroplane Co.	Bristol 450	Jack Fairman	8th
46	4 July 1954	12 Hours of Reims	Bristol Aeroplane Co.	Bristol 450	Jack Fairman	12th
47	1 May 1955	Mille Miglia	Aston Martin	Aston Martin DB2	Peter Bolton	DNF
48	12 June 1955	1955 24 Hours of Le Mans	Bristol Aeroplane Co.	Bristol 450	Jack Fairman; Tommy Line	9th
49	29 April 1956	Mille Miglia		Austin-Healey 100S	Walter Monaco	77th
50	12 May 1957	Mille Miglia		Austin-Healey 100S	Cecil Winby	37th
51	24 May 1959	Targa Florio	Tommy Wisdom	Austin-Healey Sprite	Bernard Cahier	18th
52	26 April 1964	Targa Florio	Donald Healey Motor Company	Austin-Healey Sprite	Paddy Hopkirk	DNF
