= Ann Wisdom =

English rally driver (1934–2015)

Ann Marie Riley
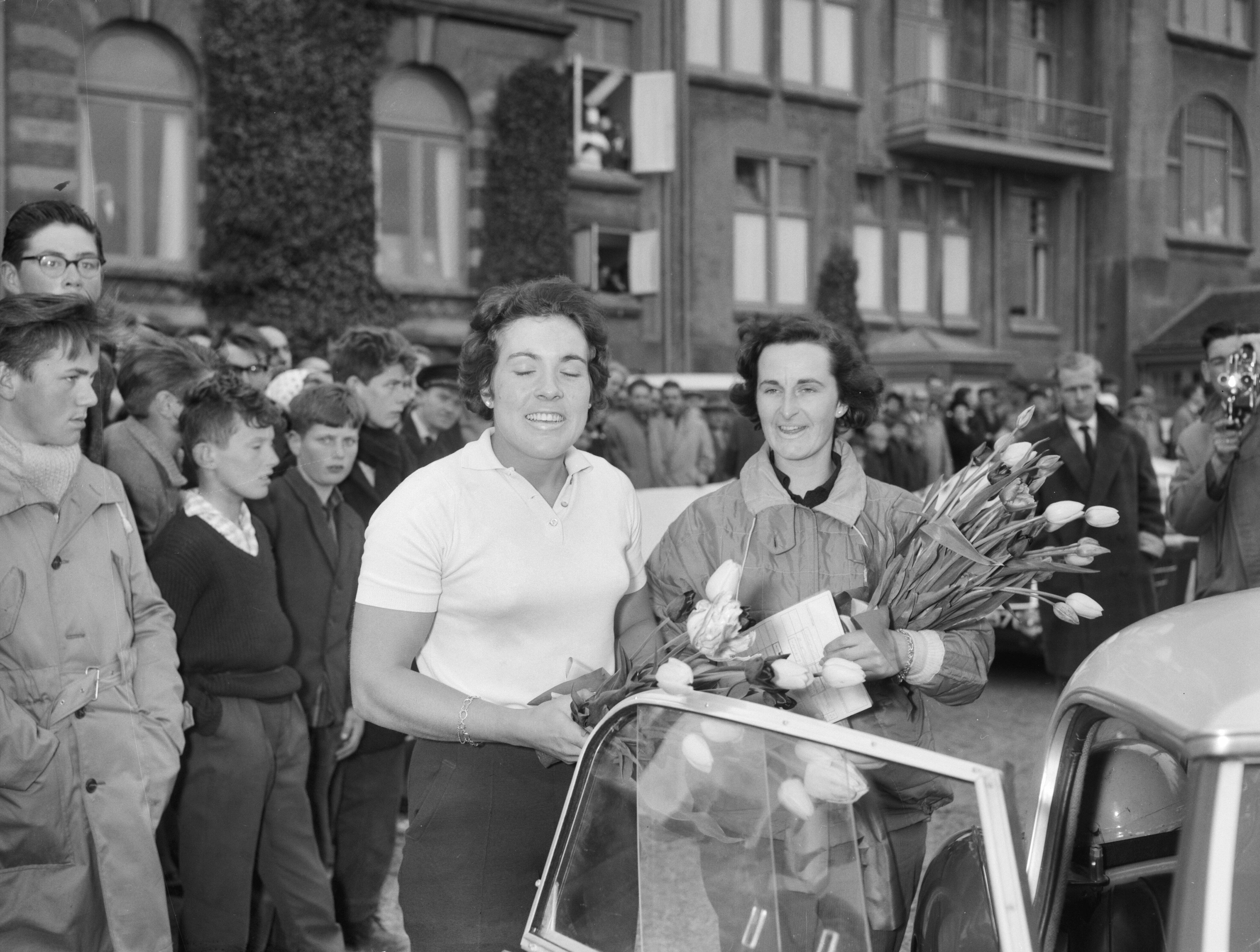
- Pat Moss & Ann Wisdom (1961)
- Born: Ann Marie Wisdom; May 28, 1934; Surrey, England
- Died: 14 October 2015 (aged 81)
- Occupation: Rally navigator
- Spouse: Peter Riley (m. 1962-2015; her death)
- Children: Jennifer Riley (born 1962); Timothy Riley (born 1964)
- Parent(s): Tommy Wisdom; Elsie Mary Wisdom

Ann Marie Wisdom (28 May 1934 – 14 October 2015) was an English rally driver, better known as a navigator.

== Career ==
During the late 1950s and early 1960s, she was well known as a navigator for Pat Moss, the sister of Sir Stirling Moss. Their partnership ensured them to compete at the same level as the men. In 1962, she ended her rally career in order to start a family, marrying the gentleman rally driver, Peter Riley. Pat bounced back, hiring erstwhile driver Pauline Mayman to navigate.

== Personal life ==
Wisdom was born in 1934, the daughter and only child of professional racers Tommy Wisdom and Elsie Wisdom (née Gleed).

In 1962, shortly after retiring, she married rally driver Peter Riley in Worthing and remained married until her death on October 14, 2015, exactly seven years after the death of Pat Moss. Peter died just under a year later, in July 2016.

During their marriage, Ann and Peter had two children, Tim and Jenny.

Ann Wisdom died on 14 October 2015, at the age of 81.
