= Elsie Mary Wisdom =

English automobile racer

- in 1930
- Born: Elsie Gleed; 2 March 1904, 1904; London
- Died: 13 April 1972, 1972
- Other name: "Bill" Wisdom
- Known for: Fastest woman
- Spouse(s): Charles Thomas Swain; Tommy Wisdom
- Children: Ann Wisdom

Elsie Mary Wisdom (2 March 1904 – 13 April 1972), also known as "Bill Wisdom", was an English automobile racer. She was one of the first women to win a race for both male and female drivers at Brooklands.

== Early life ==
Elsie Mary Gleed was born in London, the only daughter of Benjamin Gleed, a shopkeeper, and Emma Avenell Gleed. She had six brothers, who called her "Bill" as she joined in their activities.

== Career ==
Elsie Gleed learned to drive motorcycles and automobiles as a young woman. She started racing casually in the 1920s, but in 1930 her new husband Tommy Wisdom signed her up for a women-only race at Brooklands. She won that race. The following year she set the women's time record at Shelsley Walsh, and in 1932 she took the women's speed record at Brooklands. Also in 1932, Bill Wisdom and Joan Richmond of Australia won the JCC 1000 Mile Race at Brooklands—a major race in which they were the only team of women. In 1933, she was the only female member of the six-person Aston Martin team at Le Mans. She was one of four women invited to compete in the Brooklands 500 in 1935. She and her partner Dorothy Stanley-Turner finished 23rd at the 1938 24 Hours of Le Mans.

After World War II, when European automobile racing events resumed, Bill Wisdom was on a three-woman team for a Monte Carlo Rally race in 1948. An accident in 1951 at the Alpine Rally was followed by only a few more races until Wisdom's last in 1955.

== Personal life ==
Elsie Gleed married twice; to Charles Thomas Swain in 1925 (they divorced in 1929), and to racing journalist Tommy Wisdom in 1930. They had one daughter, Ann in 1934. After she retired from racing, the Wisdoms lived in Sussex. Both Wisdoms died in 1972, Bill in April and Tommy in November. Their daughter Ann "Wiz" Wisdom Riley drove in races in the 1950s and 1960s.

There is a display about women racers at Brooklands Museum, including Elsie "Bill" Wisdom. There is a file of clippings, photographs, and papers related to Elsie Wisdom in the Brooklands Archives.
