= Nash-Healey =

American sports car of the early 1950s

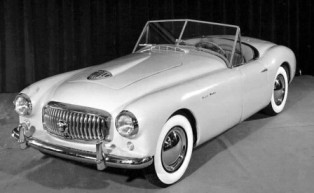
- 1951 Nash-Healey

Overview
- Manufacturer: Nash Motors
- Also called: Series 25
- Production: December 1950 – August 1954
- Model years: 1951–1954
- Assembly: Warwick, England; Turin, Italy; Kenosha, Wisconsin, US
- Designer: Len Hodges (1951); Adriano Rabbone at Pininfarina (1952–1954)

Body and chassis
- Class: Sports car
- Body style: 3-seat coupe; 3-seat roadster
- Layout: Front-engine, rear-wheel-drive
- Platform: Warwick Healey chassis
- Related: Alvis-Healey

Powertrain
- Engine: Nash Dual Jetfire OHV I6; 1951-52: 234.8 cu in (3.8 L) 125 hp (93 kW; 127 PS); Nash Le Mans Dual Jetfire OHV I6; 1952–54: 252 cu in (4.1 L) 140 hp (104 kW; 142 PS)
- Transmission: 3-speed manual with overdrive

Dimensions
- Wheelbase: roadster: 102 in (2,591 mm); coupe: 108 in (2,743 mm)
- Length: roadster: 170.75 in (4,337 mm); coupe: 180.5 in (4,585 mm)
- Width: roadster: 64 in (1,626 mm); coupe: 65 in (1,651 mm)
- Height: roadster: 48 in (1,219 mm); coupe: 55 in (1,397 mm)
- Curb weight: 2,400 lb (1,089 kg) ~ approximate

The Nash-Healey is a three-seat luxury sports car or grand tourer produced from 1951 to 1954. It was marketed by the Nash-Kelvinator conglomerate in North America as a halo car to promote sales of its Nash Motors division.

The car resulted from a joint venture between Nash-Kelvinator and British automaker, the Donald Healey Motor Company. Nash supplied the drivetrain from their range-topping Ambassador model, and Healey provided the chassis and early bodies. One year after its introduction, the car was restyled by Pininfarina, and the final assembly was transferred to Italy. Some describe the Nash-Healey as the first sports car introduced in the U.S. by a major automaker after the Great Depression.

Various Nash-Healeys, some modified road cars, and some purpose-built racers competed in several endurance racing events, most notably posting a third-place finish at the 1952 24 Hours of Le Mans.

== Origin ==
In December 1949, British engineer, rally driver, and automaker Donald Healey sailed for America aboard the RMS Queen Elizabeth ocean liner. He was going for a meeting with General Motors' (GMs) Ed Cole, hoping to secure a supply of Cadillac's new 331 cu in (5.4 L) V8 engine. Healey planned to use the engines in his company's Healey Silverstone club racer. Two such Healey/Cadillac hybrids had already been built, one in the US by American sportsman Briggs Cunningham, and one in England by Healey's own Donald Healey Motor Company; the Cadillac-engined X 4 prototype.

While aboard ship, Healey encountered a man using an elaborate stereo camera system that intrigued him. The man was George W. Mason, president of Nash-Kelvinator. The two made an acquaintance based on their shared interest in photography. Hearing Healey's plan and anticipating GM's reply, Mason told Healey to contact him if the negotiations were unsuccessful. When GM turned Healey down due to their defense commitments, Healey contacted Mason, and development of the Nash-Healey started.

As part of the arrangement between the companies, Nash paid off Healey's £50,000 bank debt, which was to be repaid in assembled cars.

A prototype was previewed at the Paris Motor Show in October 1950. The fate of this car is unknown. The Nash-Healey made its official debut in February of the following year at the 1951 Chicago Auto show. The car's full name is the Nash-Healey Series 25.

Some time after its release, the Chrysler Corporation purchased a Nash-Healey from a Detroit dealership, disassembled it, and submitted an analysis of it to the company executives.

The 1951 Nash-Healey is called the first post-war sports car from a major American automaker, as it was released two years before the Chevrolet Corvette. This appellation excludes the limited volume Kurtis-Kraft and Muntz Jet, as well as the diminutive Crosley Hotshot, Super Hotshot, and Super Sport roadsters.

== Features ==
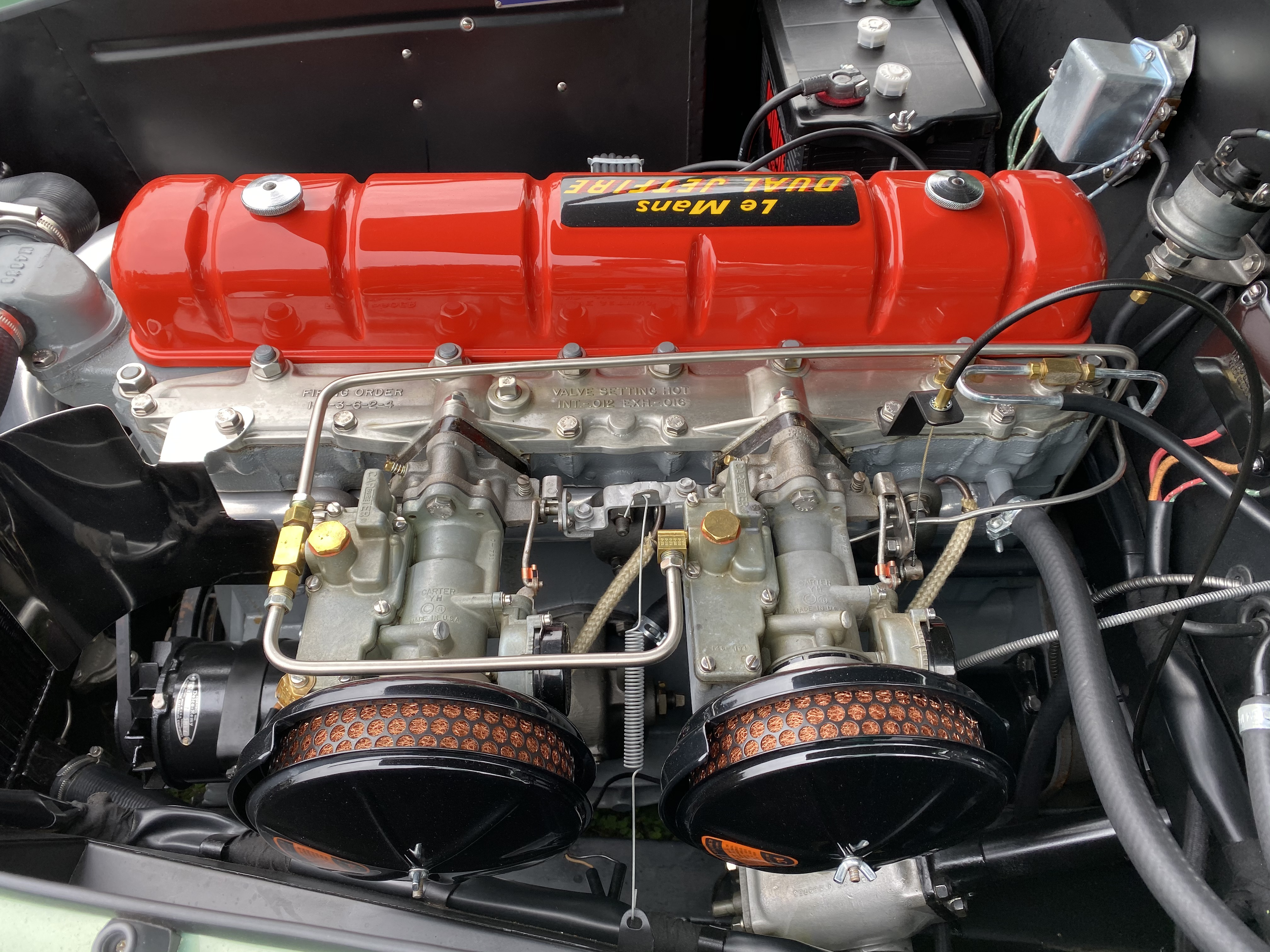
The Nash Ambassador inline-six engine with twin Carter carburetors

Nash supplied Healey's company with the powertrain components: the Ambassador's inline six-cylinder OHV 234.8 cu in (3.85 L) engine and three-speed manual transmission with Borg-Warner overdrive. Healey fitted a lighter, higher-compression aluminum cylinder head (in place of the cast-iron stock item) with twin 1.75-inch (44 mm) SU carburetors. This increased power from the stock 112 hp (84 kW; 114 PS) version to 125 hp (93 kW; 127 PS).

The chassis was a widened and reinforced Healey Silverstone box-section ladder-type steel frame. Independent front suspension, also Healey Silverstone, was by coil springs, trailing link, and an anti-roll bar. The rear suspension featured a Nash-supplied torque tube and live axle, replacing the Silverstone's Riley Motor parts. Lateral location of the axle was handled by a Panhard rod.

Healey designed the aluminum body, but it was outsourced. Panelcraft Sheet Metal of Birmingham fabricated the body. It incorporated a Nash grille, bumpers, and other trim. Healey was responsible for the car's final assembly.

The car had drum brakes all around. Wheels were steel, with full-diameter chrome hubcaps and 4-ply 6.40×15-inch whitewall tires. The interior featured luxurious leather upholstery, foam rubber cushions, an adjustable steering wheel, and a cigarette lighter. Completed vehicles were shipped to the United States and marketed through the Nash dealership network.

== Model years ==
=== 1951 ===
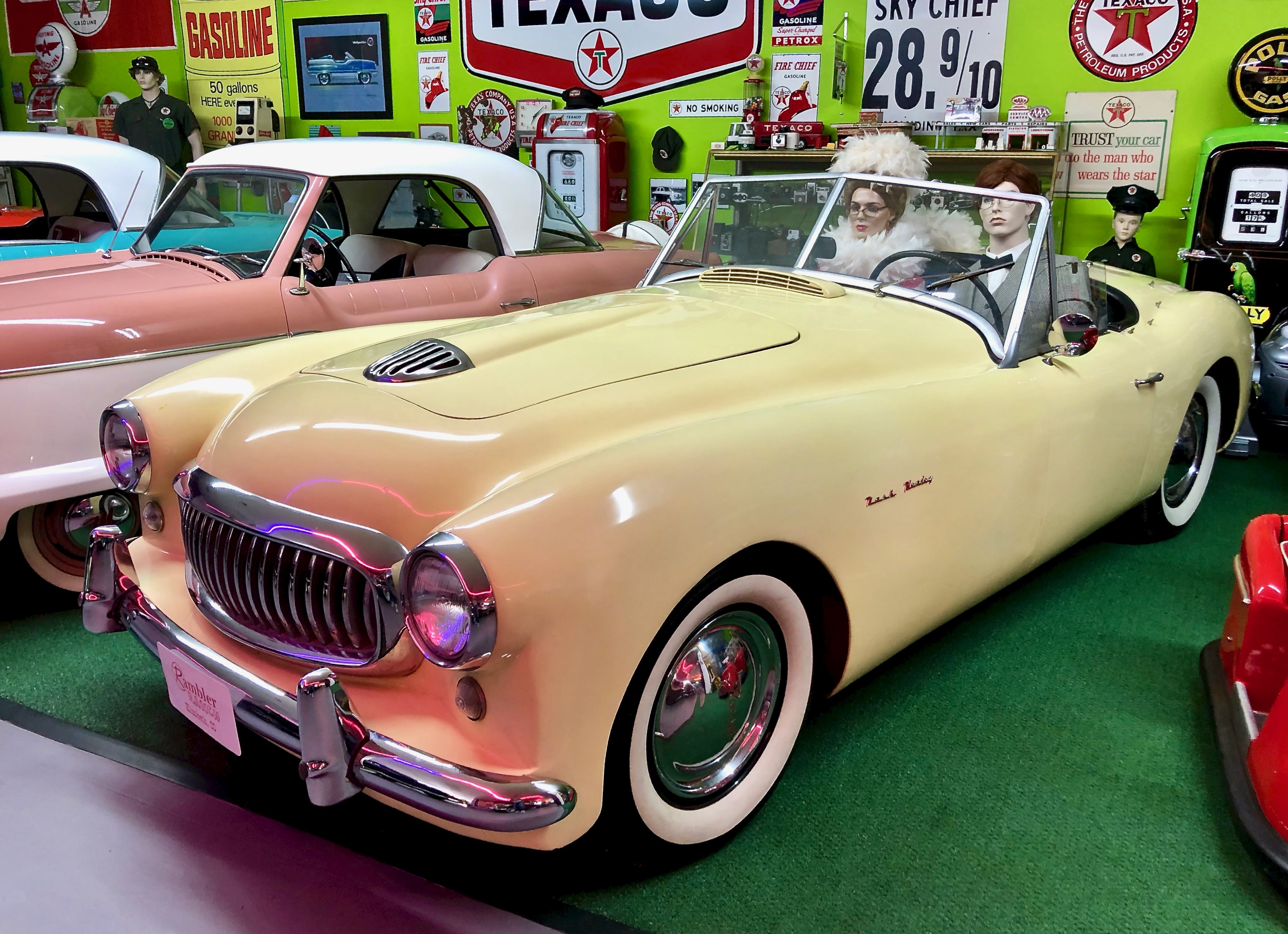
1951 Nash-Healey

The 1951 Nash-Healey was the first post-war sports car from a major American automaker, two years ahead of the Chevrolet Corvette. The custom-built Kurtis-Kraft which predated it never reached "production car" status, with 18 units being built.

A prototype was exhibited at the Paris Motor Show in September 1950. The production model debuted at the February 1951 Chicago Auto Show, followed that month by the Miami Auto Show. Also classified as a grand tourer for its luxury appointments and extreme price, the car served its purpose and was campaigned in several racing circuits.

Donald Healey gave the first example to Petula Clark, with the registration number PET 1. The only colors available were "Champagne Ivory" and "Sunset Maroon". The suggested retail price (MSRP) of US$3,767 F.O.B. New York City was considered to be high priced.

=== 1952 ===
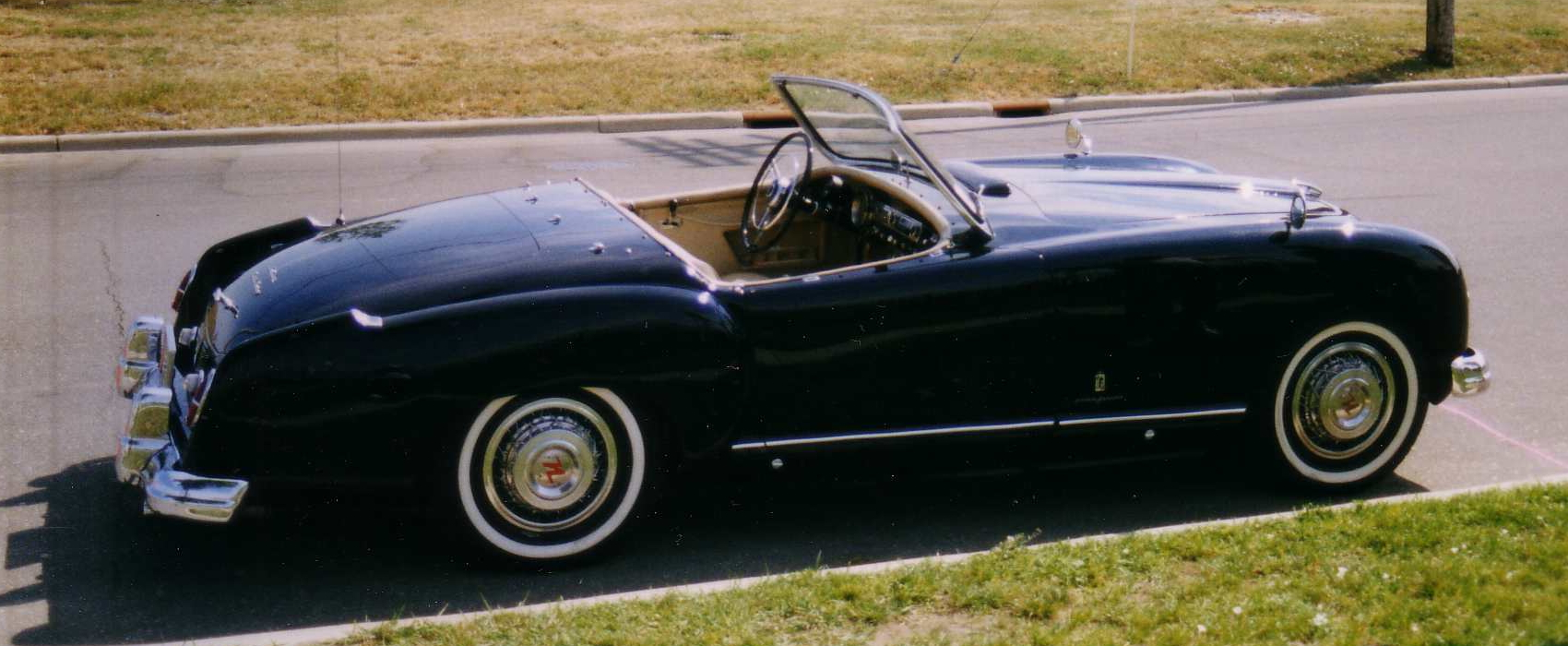
Nash-Healey roadster

For the 1952 model year, Nash commissioned Italian designer Battista Farina and his carrozzeria, Pinin Farina, to revise the original body design. One objective was to make the new sports car resemble the rest of Nash's models more closely. The front received a new grille incorporating inboard headlights. The sides gained distinct fender character lines ending with small tailfins in the rear. A curved windshield replaced the previous two-piece flat windshield. The restyled car appeared at that year's Chicago Auto Show. Reflecting its role as a halo car, the Nash Ambassador and Statesman models adopted a Nash-Healey-inspired grille with inboard headlights for 1955, and advertising featured the new Nash with a Nash-Healey in the background to show the similarity.

Pininfarina in Turin built the steel bodies with the exception of the aluminum hood, trunk lid, and dashboard. The aluminum panels, plus careful engineering, reduced curb weight. The Nash engine was enlarged to 252 cu in (4.1 L), producing 140 hp (104 kW; 142 PS) with American-made twin Carter Carburetors .

Shipping costs were considerable and moderated by Kelvinator's trans-Atlantic success in the European marketplace. From Kenosha, Wisconsin, the Nash engines and drivetrains went to England for installation in the Healey-fabricated frames. Healey then sent the rolling chassis to Italy, where Pininfarina's craftsmen fashioned the bodywork and assembled the finished product. They were then exported to the U.S., with the car's complicated logistical process resulting in a $5,908 sticker price in 1953, approaching double the new Chevrolet Corvette's $3,513.

=== 1953 ===
The 1953 model year saw the introduction of a new closed coupe alongside the roadster (now termed a "convertible"). Capitalizing on the third place finish at Le Mans by a lightweight racing Nash-Healey purpose-built for the race (see below), the new model was called the "Le Mans" coupe. Nash had already named the engine the "Le-Mans Dual Jetfire Ambassador Six" in 1952, in reference to the previous racing exploits of the lightweight competition cars.

Some describe the new design as "magnificent". Some "people didn't take to the inboard headlights". This headlight mounting was described as "Safety-Vu" concentrating illumination, and their low position increased safety under foggy conditions. The 1953 "Le Mans" model was awarded first prize in March of that year in the Italian International Concours d'Elegance held at Stresa, Italy.

Leveraging the popularity of golf to promote their cars, Nash Motors and Nash dealers sponsored what the automaker described as "more than 20 major golf tournaments across the country" in 1953, and golfer Sam Snead was shown with his Nash-Healey roadster on the cover of the June 1953 issue of Nash News.

Product placement was another marketing strategy. A roadster owned by Dick Powell was driven by George Reeves, as Clark Kent, in four TV episodes of the Adventures of Superman. Another roadster appears in the 1954 film Sabrina starring Humphrey Bogart, William Holden, and Audrey Hepburn .

Walt Disney owned 2 one with a Cadillac motor and the other stock with a teal coupe. Nash gifted it to the studio in 1954 when they made the one of the last commercials Mickey mouse appeared in outside disney projects. The teal car was outfitted with custom mickey mouse mirrors.

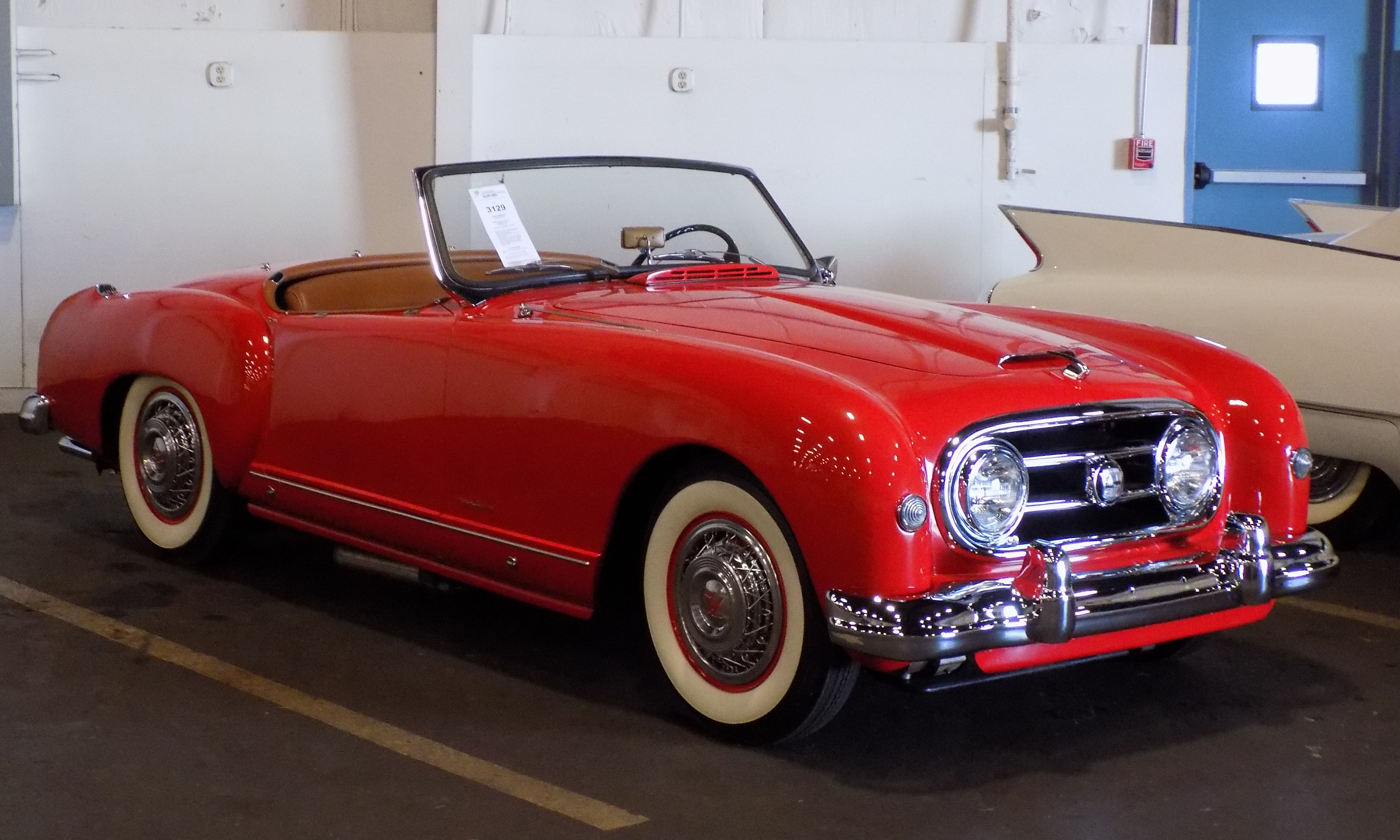
1953 Nash-Healey Convertible

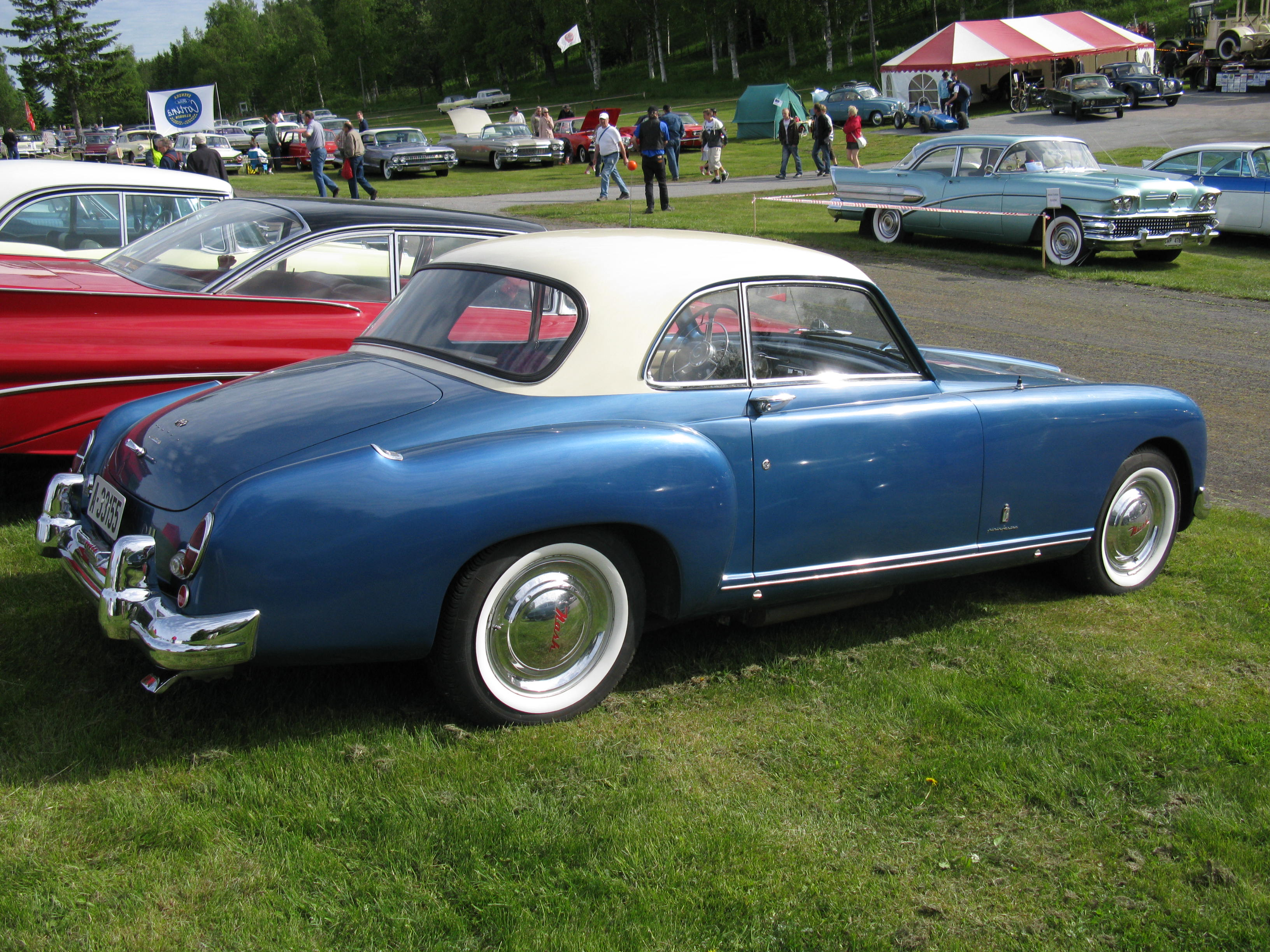
Nash-Healey coupe

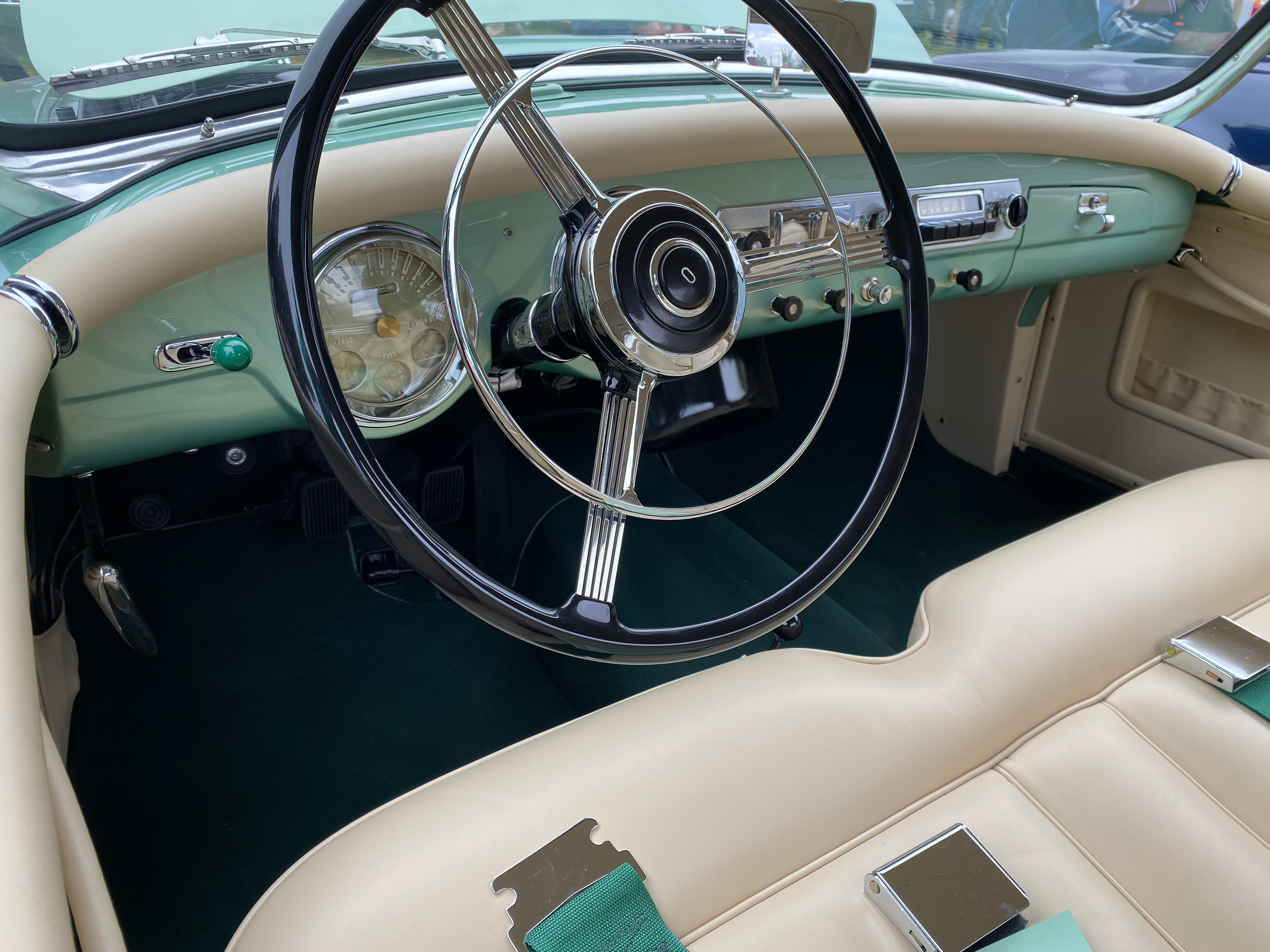
Nash-Healey interior

=== 1954 ===
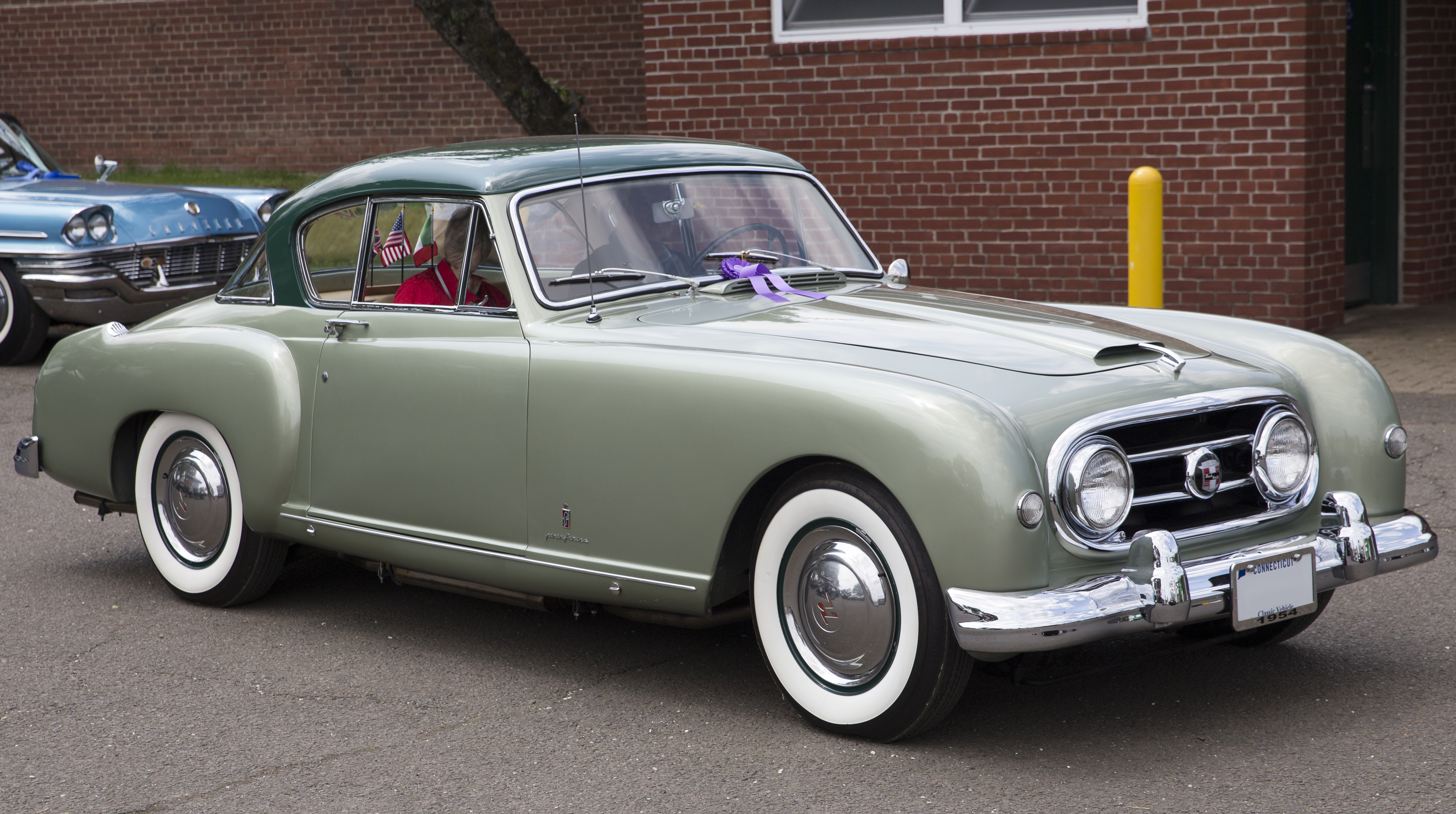
1954 Nash-Healey Le Mans Coupe

Nash-Kelvinator became reorganized as a division of American Motors Corporation (AMC) that was formed as a result of a merger with Hudson Motor Car Company on 1 May 1954. Nash was faced with limited resources for marketing, promotion, and further development of this niche market car compared to its volume models. By this time AMC knew that the similar, luxurious two-seat Ford Thunderbird with V8 power was being planned. In light of the low sales for the preceding years, Nash delayed the introduction of the 1954 models until 3 June and discontinued the convertible, leaving just a slightly reworked Le Mans Coupe, distinguished by a reverse slanted "C" pillar and a three-piece rear window instead of the previous one-piece glass. Early 1954s still carried the original, oval rear window treatment. In all, 62 oval-window coupés were built.

Healey was by now focusing on its new Austin-Healey 100, "and the Nash-Healey had to be abandoned." Although the international shipping charges were a significant cost factor, Nash cut the POE (port of entry) price by more than $1,200 to $5,128. Production ceased in August. A few leftover 1954s were sold as 1955 models.

== Production ==
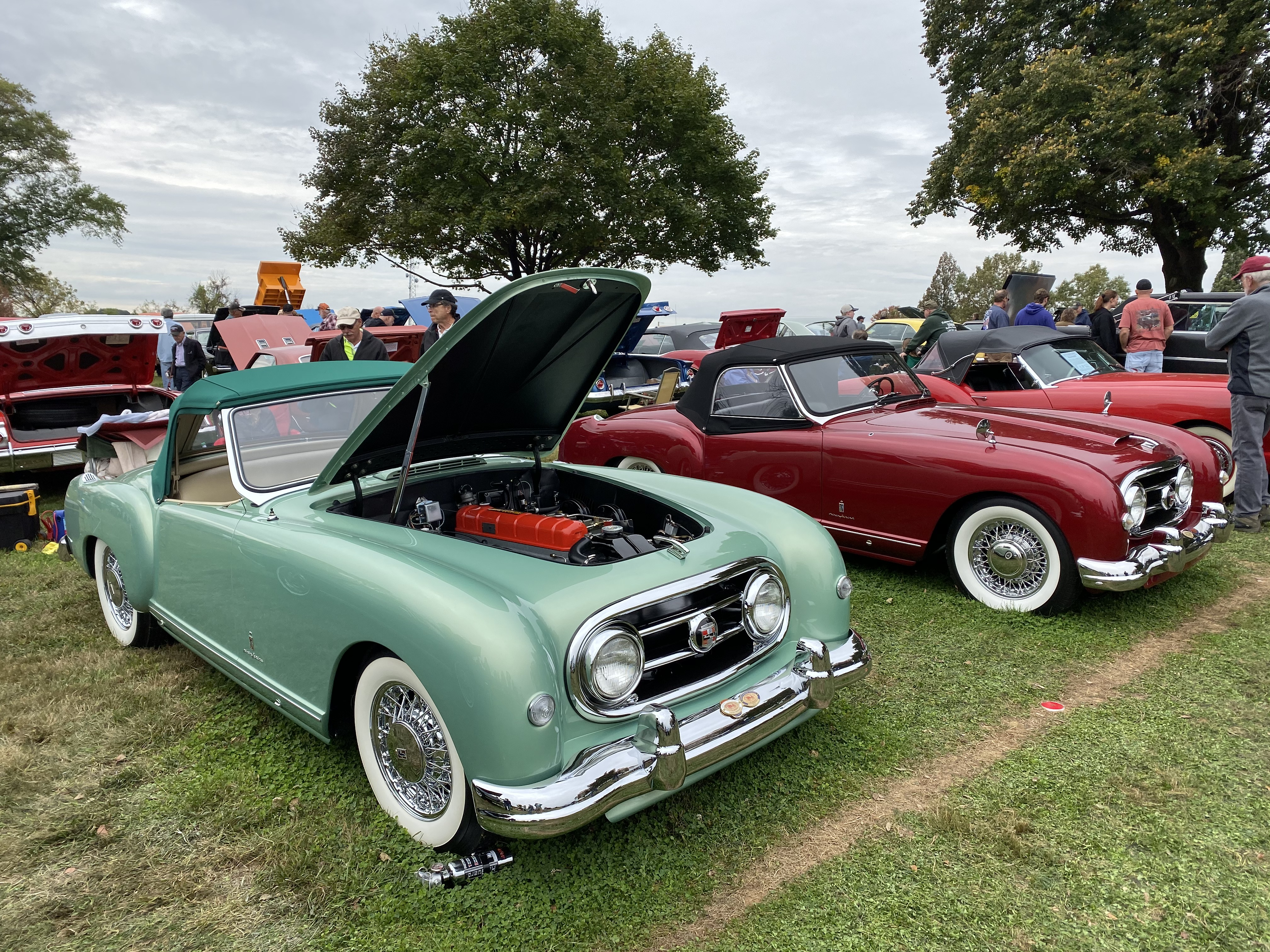
Two 1953 Nash-Healey roadsters

All 1951 Nash-Healeys were British-built. Bodies were crafted at Panelcraft Sheet Metal, and final assembly was completed at the Healey factory in Warwick. The 1952 through 1954 models were built in Italy by Pinin Farina.

Nash-Healey production numbers
1951	104
1952	150
1953	162
1954	90
Total	506

The Nash-Healey registry has 520 entries, including prototypes and race vehicles.

For contextual comparison, the Nash-Healey is framed in U.S. auto history with the 1953 Kaiser Darrin, 1953 Chevrolet Corvette, and 1955 Ford Thunderbird. The 1954 model year Nash-Healey price to the public was close to $6,000 compared with around $3,500 for a Chevrolet Corvette and $3,000 for a 1955 Ford Thunderbird.

== Technical data ==
Nash-Healey	1951 Roadster	1952 Roadster	1953 Convertible	1953-54 Coupe
Engine:	Nash Ambassador Dual Jetfire OHV inline 6		Nash Ambassador Le Mans Dual Jetfire OHV inline 6	
Engine materials:	Cast iron block, aluminum cylinder head			
Bore × Stroke:	3.375 in × 4.375 in (86 mm × 111 mm)		3.5 in × 4.375 in (89 mm × 111 mm)	
Displacement:	235 cu in (3,851 cc)		253 cu in (4,146 cc)	
Compression ratio:	8.1:1		8.25:1	
Maximum power:	125 bhp (93 kW) at 4000 rpm		140 bhp (104 kW) at 4000 rpm	
Maximum torque:	210 ft⋅lb (285 N⋅m) at 1600 rpm		230 ft⋅lb (312 N⋅m) at 2000 rpm	
Valvetrain:	Single cam-in-block, pushrods, rocker arms, two overhead valves per cylinder			
Induction:	2 × SU H4		2 × Carter YH	
Cooling:	Water-cooled			
Transmission:	Borg Warner T-86E 3-speed manual with Borg Warner overdrive			
Steering:	Marles steering gear			
Brakes f/r:	Bendix 10 in (254 mm) drums / 10 in (254 mm) drums			
Suspension front:	Trailing arms, coil springs, hydraulic lever arm dampers, anti-roll bar			
Suspension rear:	Torque tube, live axle, radius rods, coil springs, telescopic dampers, Panhard rod			
Body/Chassis:	Light alloy body, steel chassis	Steel and alloy body, steel chassis		
Track f/r:	53 / 53 in (1,346 / 1,346 mm)	53 / 54.87 in (1,346 / 1,394 mm)		
Wheelbase:	102 in (2,591 mm)			108 in (2,743 mm)
Tyres f/r:	6.40 - 15			
Length; Width; Height:	170 in (4,318 mm); 66 in (1,676 mm); 55.5 in (1,410 mm)	170.75 in (4,337 mm); 64 in (1,626 mm); 48.65 in (1,236 mm)		180.5 in (4,585 mm); 65.87 in (1,673 mm); 55 in (1,397 mm)
Weight:	2,780 lb (1,261.0 kg)	2,920 lb (1,324.5 kg)		3,140 lb (1,424.3 kg)
Maximum speed:	103 mph (166 km/h)			
Acceleration 0–60 mph (0–97 km/h):	11.5 seconds			

== Motorsports ==
=== Panamericana pace car ===
A Nash-Healey served as the course car for the 1951 Carrera Panamericana, described as one of the most dangerous automobile races of any type in the world. Driven by Chuck Stevenson, the Nash-Healey ran ahead of the racers to ensure the way was clear on "the world's greatest road race".

=== Endurance racing ===
To create a racing pedigree for the marque, Donald Healey built four lightweight Nash-Healeys for endurance racing Like the road cars, they had Nash Ambassador engines and drivelines. However, fitting higher-compression aluminum cylinder heads, special manifolds, and twin SU carburetors increased their power to 200 hp (149 kW; 203 PS). The cars had spartan, lightweight aluminum racing bodies. Three open versions were built, and one coupe. These cars competed in four consecutive Le Mans races and one Mille Miglia.

==== 1950 Le Mans ====
Tony Rolt and Duncan Hamilton debuted the prototype at Le Mans in 1950. It was the first-ever Le Mans entry to have an overdrive transmission. Not only was the car one of the 29 finishers from the field of 66, but also finished in fourth place. This outstanding achievement sealed Healey's contract with Nash for a limited production run of the road cars. Roger Menadue, head of Healey's experimental department, played a significant role in the success: He filed slots in the backplates of the brakes and extended the adjusting mechanism to a small exterior lever. Thus, in a matter of seconds, he could adjust the brakes during pit stops without jacking the car up—an innovation that saved as much as half an hour at each stop.

==== 1951 Le Mans ====
In the 1951 Le Mans race, Rolt and Hamilton took fourth in class and sixth overall behind a Jaguar, two Talbot-Lagos and two Aston Martins. They finished immediately ahead of two Ferraris and another Aston Martin.

==== 1952 Le Mans ====
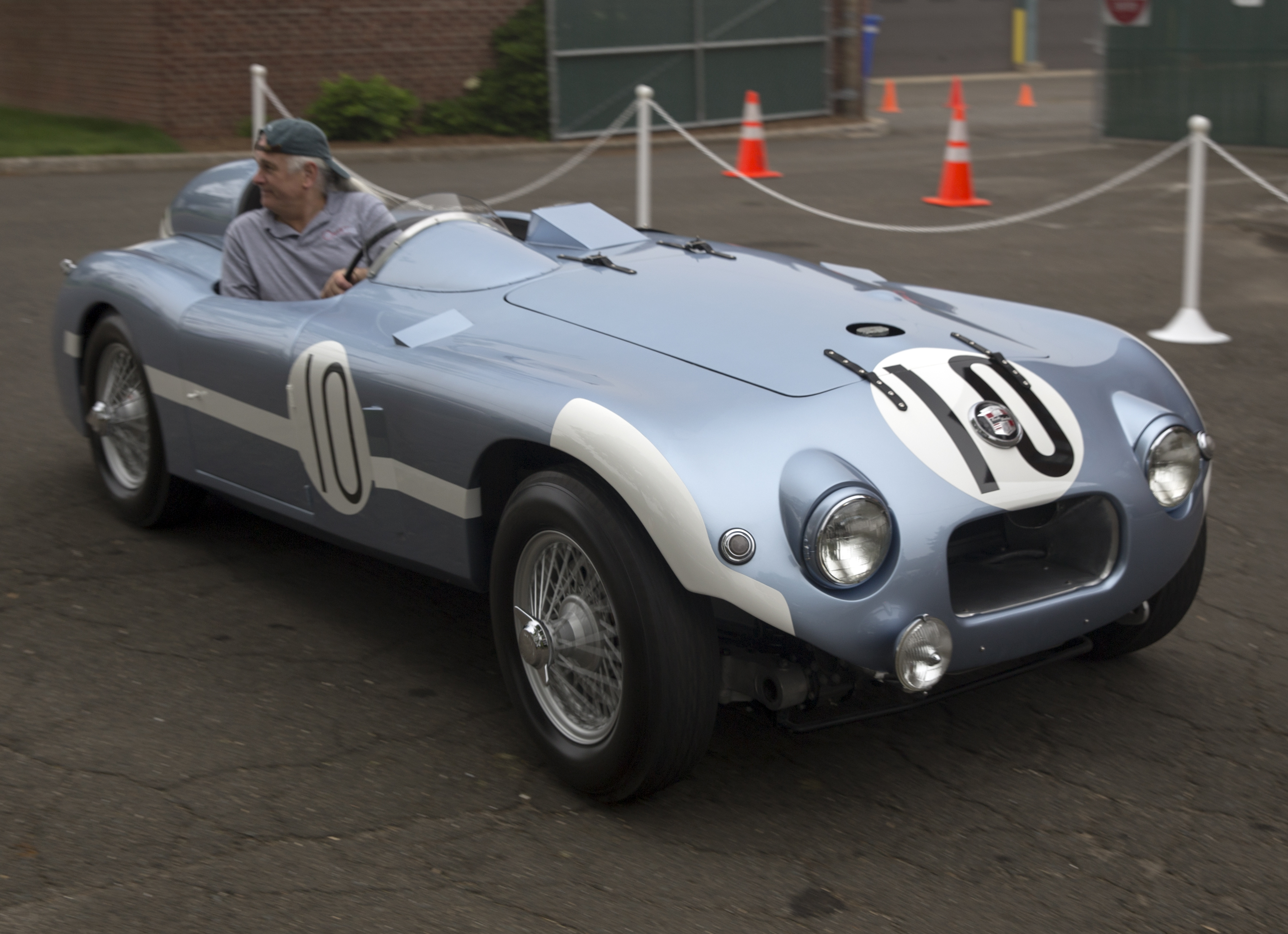
Chassis X8, the lightweight Nash-Healey that placed third in the 1952 Le Mans 24-hour race

In the 1952 Le Mans race, when only 17 of the 58 starters finished, the entry driven by Leslie Johnson and motoring journalist Tommy Wisdom took third overall behind two factory-entered Mercedes-Benz 300SLs; also first in class, ahead of Chinetti's Ferrari, and second in the Rudge-Whitworth Cup for the best performance over two consecutive years. In addition, they won the Motor Gold Challenge Cup. The drivers said the car was more nimble through the corners than its more exotic competitors. It delivered 13 mpg_{‑US} (18 L/100 km; 16 mpg_{‑imp}) and the engine needed no oil or water during the entire 24 hours. The car had been built from scratch in a fortnight, Menadue and his assistant Jock Reid fabricating the body in less than a week, by eye, without any drawings. Healey said: "That's an ugly bugger, isn't it, Roger?"

==== 1952 Mille Miglia ====
The same year, Johnson raced the car in the Mille Miglia, the thousand-mile Italian road race that would be banned as too dangerous five years later. Daily Telegraph motoring correspondent Bill McKenzie rode as passenger. They finished a creditable seventh overall to Bracco's winning works team Ferrari, the works Mercedes-Benz 300SLs of Kling and Caracciola, and three works Lancias; they also took fourth in class. The coupe driven by Donald Healey and his son Geoffrey crashed out.

==== 1953 Le Mans ====
For the 1953 Le Mans race, the factory partnered Johnson with Bert Hadley in one of two cars with redesigned bodies. Johnson started in 27th place. Although he and Hadley advanced steadily up the race order, they were 11th at the finish, 39 laps behind the winning Jaguar, despite an average speed of 92.45 miles per hour (148.78 km/h)—higher than the previous year's run to third place. However, they beat both of Donald Healey's new Austin-Healey 100s. The second Nash-Healey of Veyron and Giraud-Cabantous retired after nine laps.

This concluded the factory's race program with the lightweight competition cars. The 1952 Le Mans/Mille Miglia car passed into private ownership and raced in America.

== Planned successors ==
=== Wisp ===
Nash's designer, Ed Anderson, wanted to bring the design for a successor to the Nash-Healey back in-house after Pinin Farina restyled the car for 1952. In 1953, he created the Wisp. Sketches of the car show a low 2-seater with a tapering tail and side coves, foreshadowing the Corvette. Master Modeler Charl Greene created a wooden scale model of the Wisp to show to management, but Nash did not have the resources to fund the development of a new car for a small market. Anderson requested a quote from Pinin Farina to have a single copy built for him, but did not proceed with the project.

=== Palm Beach ===
The 1956 Nash Rambler Palm Beach was a design commissioned by Mason as a possible successor to the Nash-Healey. Pinin Farina drew the shape. This 2-seater featured a large circular air intake at the front, reminiscent of Farina's Lancia PF200 of 1953, and prominent tail fins. The car was built on a Nash Rambler chassis and is powered by a Rambler straight-six flathead engine mated to a three-speed manual transmission. The car debuted on Farina's stand at the 1956 Turin Auto Show, after which it was in the personal collection of Roy Chapin Jr., CEO and Chairman of American Motors, until Joe Bortz purchased it. In 2007, the Palm Beach was bought by Jacques Harguindeguy.

== Alvis-Healey ==
In Britain, Healey sold a model with Hodges' original Nash-Healey bodywork as the Healey Sports Convertible. A different piece replaced the Nash grille, the power bulge in the hood was deleted, and other minor features, such as a scuttle vent, fog lamps, and revised wheel covers, were added.

Powering the car was a 3.0 L (183 cu in) inline six-cylinder engine from the Alvis TB 21 fed by two SU carburetors. Built on a G-Type chassis; it is commonly called the Alvis-Healey.

The Alvis-Healey also used the clutch and transmission from Alvis, and replaced the Nash-Healey's torque tube rear drive with a rigid Salisbury axle suspended on coil springs and located by trailing links, with the drive reaching the rear axle via an open Hardy-Spicer driveshaft.

Approximately twenty-five examples were built.
