= Bernard Cahier =

French photo journalist

- Born: June 20, 1927; Marseille, France
- Died: June 10, 2008 (aged 80); Évian-les-Bains, France
- Occupations: Photo-journalist; Racing driver Actor
- Years active: 1952-1985
- Known for: IRPA (founder); Cahier Archive (founder)

Targa Florio
- Years active: 1957; 1959-1960; 1962-1963; 1967
- Teams: Tommy Wisdom; Gérard Laureau; Downton Engineering; Porsche System Engineering
- Website: https://www.f1-photo.com/

Bernard Cahier (20 June 1927 – 10 July 2008) was a French Formula One photo-journalist. In addition to his extensive photography work, Cahier was also a racing driver and one-time actor in the 1966 movie Grand Prix.

== Biography ==
Cahier was born in Marseille, where he first got a taste of motor racing at the 1932 Marseilles GP at Miramas. His father was a general, and aged 17, Cahier himself joined the French resistance in Normandy during World War II. Following liberation of the region, Cahier joined General Philippe Leclerc's 2nd Armored Division clearing mines in areas such as Royan pocket in western France and the liberation of Southern Germany in the spring of 1945. He would spend a year after the war in Cameroon, before travelling to the USA to study at UCLA. During this time, Cahier would work at International Motors alongside fellow salesman and future Formula One world champion, Phil Hill. He would later make a cameo appearance in the 1966 movie Grand Prix, having supported director John Frankenheimer in production.

Cahier raced in the 1956 Mille Miglia finishing 154th in a Renault Dauphine. The following year, he would compete in his first Targa Florio. In 1967, alongside ski racer Jean-Claude Killy, Cahier would finish 7th overall in the race and first in class driving a Porsche 911.

Cahier was the founder of the International Racing Press Association in 1968, and later president, during the tumultuous FIA versus FOCA battle. He would also represent Goodyear in a PR role until 1983. Much of Cahier's work, and later his son Paul-Henri, is part of the Cahier Archive one of the largest archives of Formula One photographs in the world.

== Filmography ==
Year	Title	Role
1966	Grand Prix	Journalist

== Bibliography ==
- Pilotes légendaires de la Formule 1, with Xavier Chimits and Paul-Henri Cahier, Editions Tana, 2 October 2006
- Mes meilleurs souvenirs, With Xavier Chimits, Editions Drivers, 11 January 2007
- F-Stops, pit stops, laughter & tears, Autosports Marketing Associates Ltd, 2007
- Grand Prix Racers (Portraits of Speed) Motorbooks International, May 2008

== Gallery ==
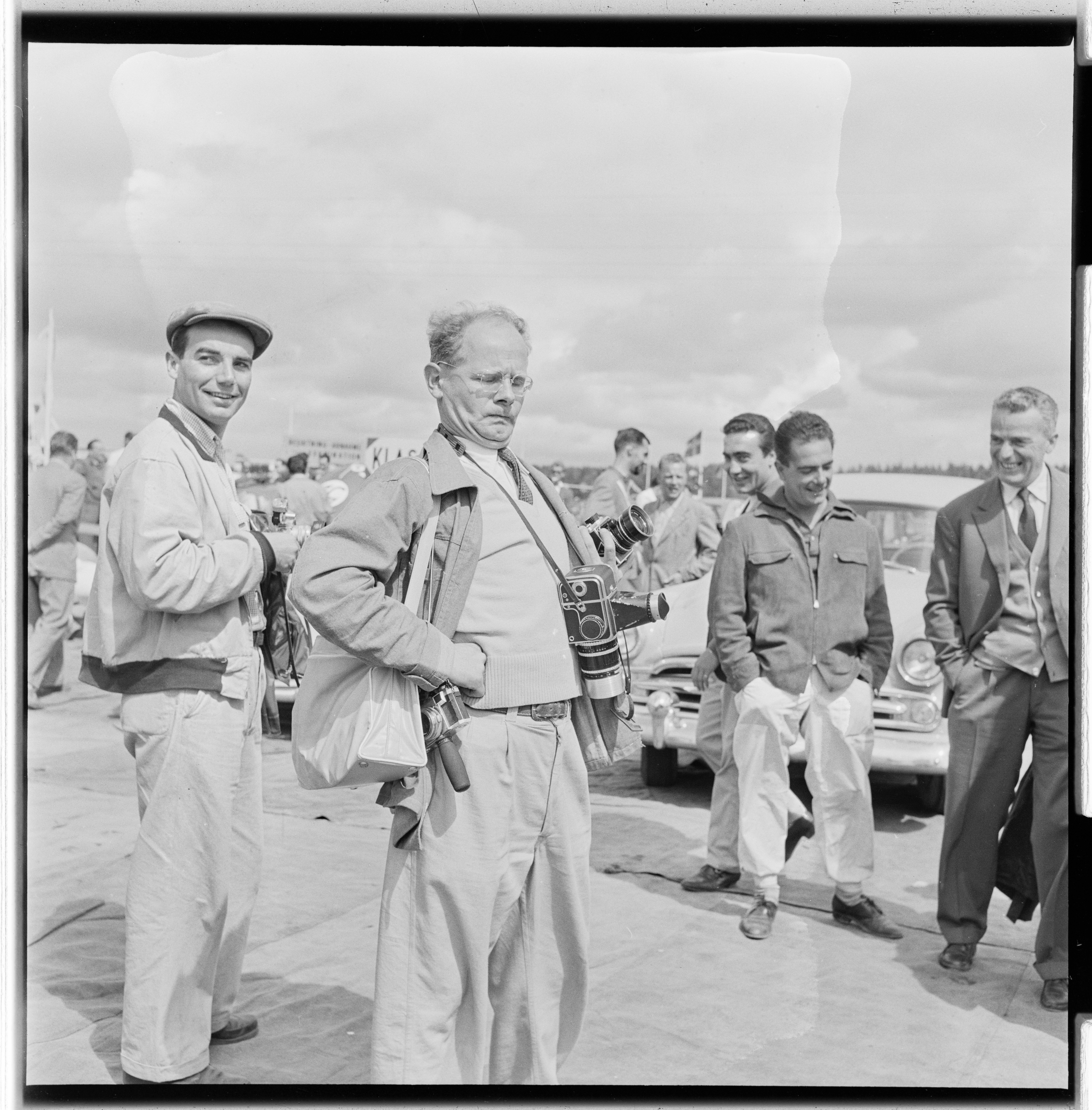
Cahier (left) at the 1955 Grand Prix of Kristianstad

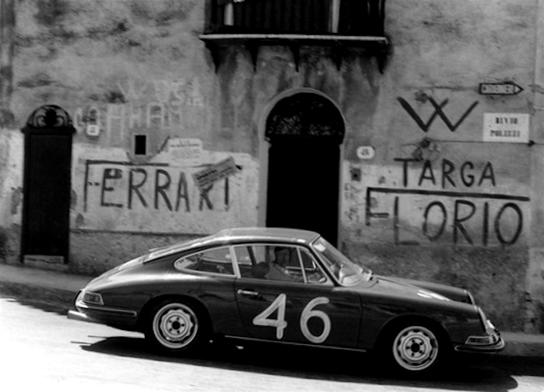
Cahier and Killy's Porsche in the 1967 Targa Florio

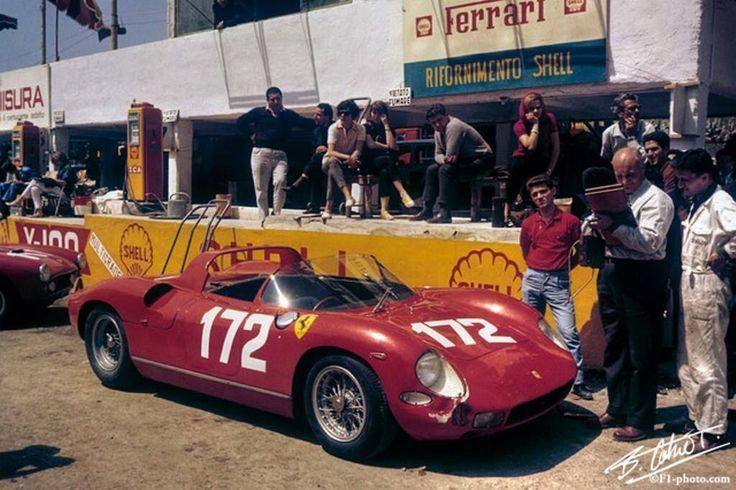
An example of Cahier's photography at the 1963 Targa Florio

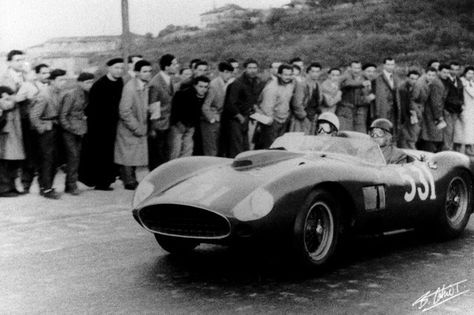
Cahier's photograph of De Portago and Nelson at the 1957 Mille Miglia before their fatal accident
