= Duncan Industries =

1940s English motor body manufacturer

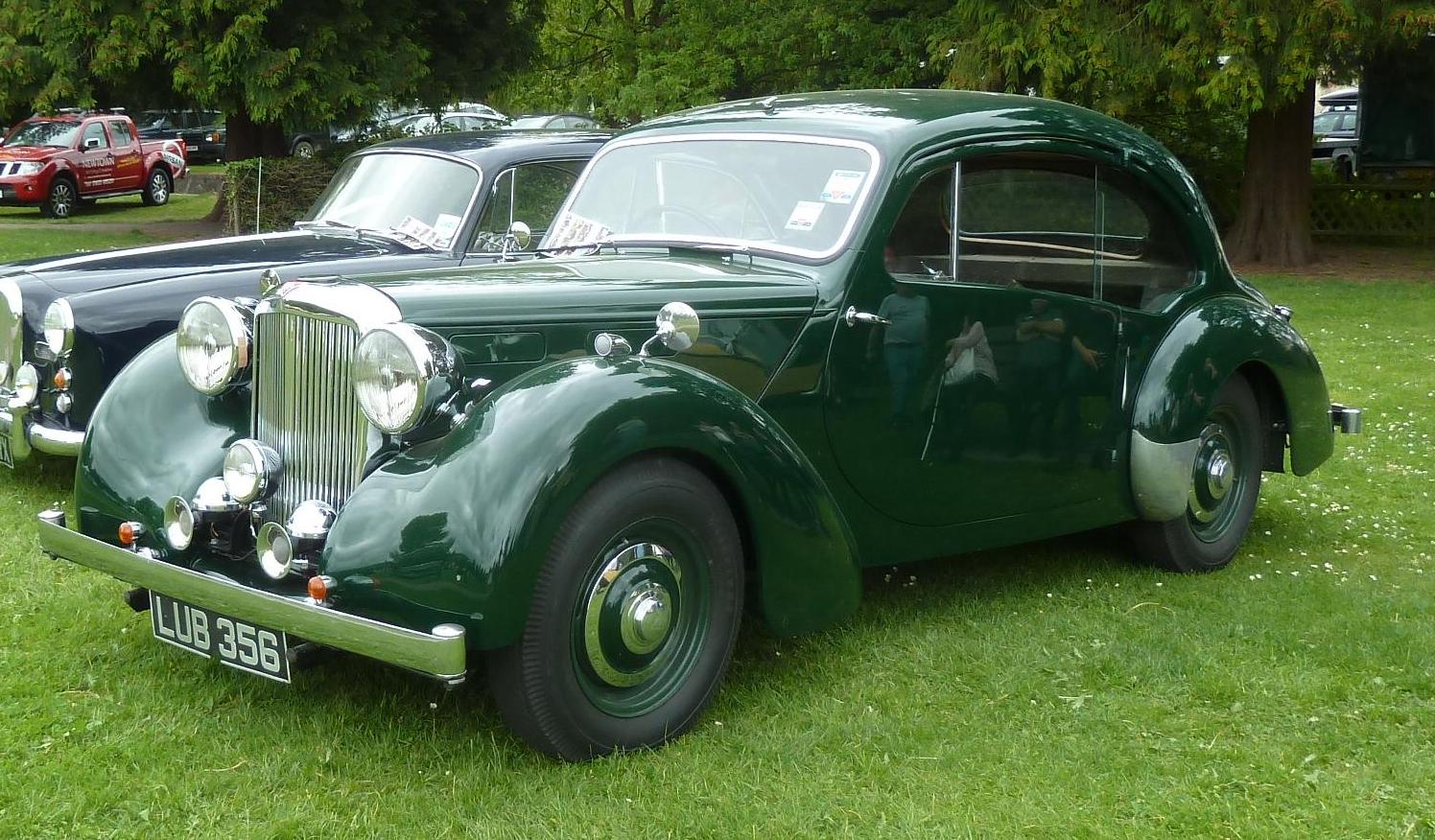
Alvis by Duncan Industries

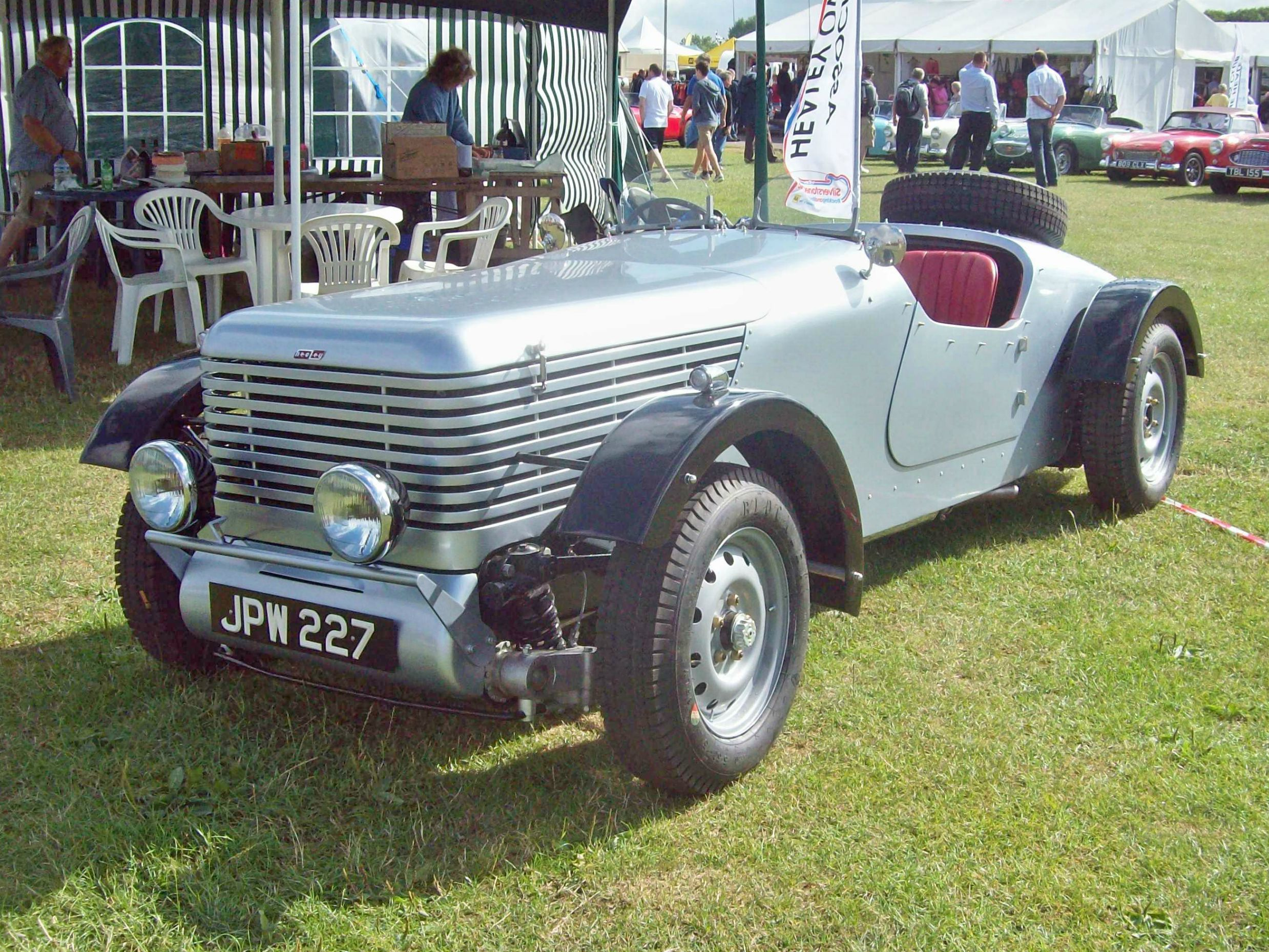
Healey with delivery drone body

Duncan Industries was a short-lived motor body manufacturer in North Walsham, Norfolk, England. It is believed to have made about 30 bodies for Alvis chassis and a lesser number for Healey chassis.

Duncan Motor Industries (Engineers) Limited was formed soon after the Second World War by engineer Ian Gair Duncan who had wartime experience as chief technical assistant to Roy Fedden, chief engineer of the Bristol Aeroplane Company.

Duncan set up his new business in his home town of North Walsham and, assisted by local boatbuilders, began building wood-framed bodies covered with alloy sheet metal to fit on Alvis chassis. Steel supplies were rationed and the demand for new cars very high and it made commercial sense for Alvis to sell its chassis to coachbuilders. He also developed a car he called Dragonfly using an air-cooled 2-cylinder engine mounted above its gearbox and final drive unit in a front-wheel-drive configuration. He managed to sell this design to Austin for what was then a large sum of money.

Duncan also developed a body of the same overall design and shape to fit a chassis made by Donald Healey Motor Company. The chassis were delivered from Warwick to North Walsham by drivers protected by a special temporary body now known as a Duncan Drone.

The Healey body differed from the Alvis body. Duncan disposed of the traditional Alvis grille and put a long low nose out with the Healey grille at its tip. It is thought as many as 39 of these bodies may have been made.

It became clear the venture was unsustainable and Duncan went back into management in the automotive components industry.
