= Doreen Evans =

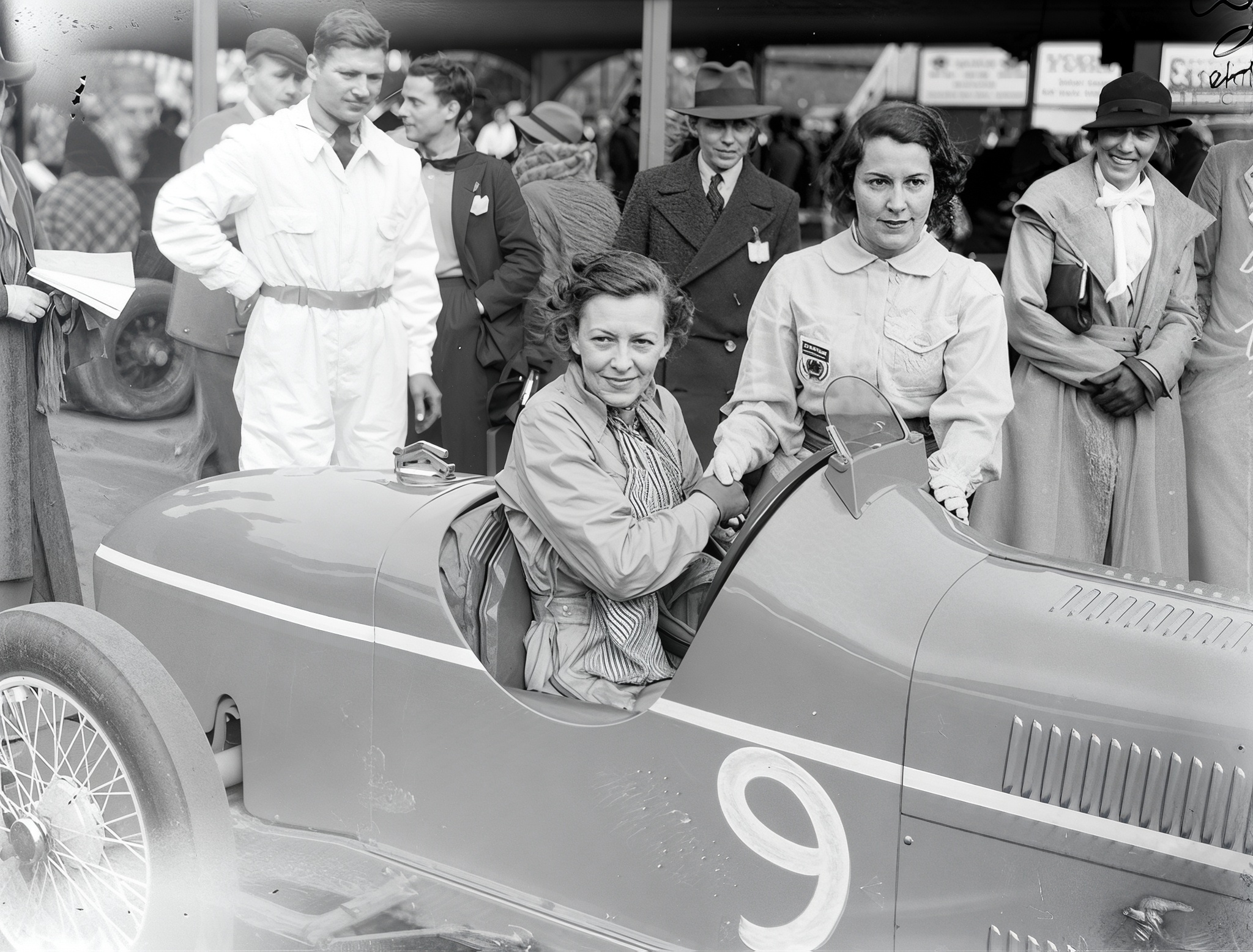
Doreen Evans seated, with Kay Petre standing.

Doreen Barbara Mignonette Boyer (née Evans; 4 June 1916 – 18 April 1982) was a British racing driver of the 1930s. She took up motor racing at the age of 17 when her father gave her a sports car and she took part in races at tracks such as Brooklands, Donington Park and Shelsley Walsh Speed Hill Climb driving MG cars. Evans also participated in the 1935 24 Hours of Le Mans as part of a three-car, six-women team dubbed "George Eyston's Dancing Daughters". She set the ladies' record at the Shelsley Walsh Speed Hill Climb before retiring from racing in 1936 and moving to the United States, qualifying as a pilot.

== Biography ==
Evans was born on 4 June 1916 in Kingston upon Thames, London. She was from a family of motoring enthusiasts that were early adpoters of the motor car in Britain (including her father B. J. Evans) and she had two elder brothers who also became motor racing drivers. On her 17th birthday, Evans received a sports car from her father. Having received encouragement from her brothers and approval from her father, she began her career in motor racing at Brooklands in 1933; Evans received coaching from her brothers and one brother, Kenneth, tuned their cars.

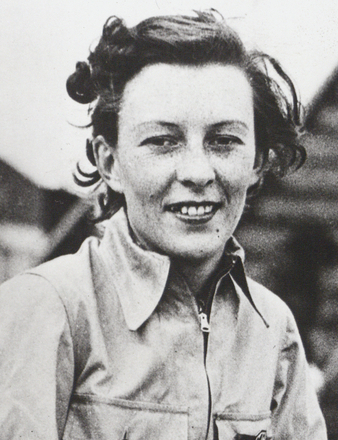
Doreen Evans, 1916-1982 (portrait) (cropped)

She took part in the LCC Relay Race at Brooklands alongside Margaret Allan and Irene Schwedler sharing a MG Magnette in 1934 and finished in third place. That October Evans won a Ladies’ Mountain race at the Motor Show meeting at Brooklands at a speed of 67.5 mph (108.6 km/h), and woman the Ladies Cup of the London-Gloucestershire Trial. For 1935, Kenneth redesigned her Q-type MG Midget to a single seater frame to extract extra pace in the winter months. Evans won a 1935 March Second Short Handicap on the Outer Circuit at the Brooklands March at 101.77 mph (163.78 km/h). In the following month, she raced at Donington Park for the first time in her career and became the first woman to drive on the track. Evans came second in the 25-mile handicap race. She competed in the 1935 RAC Rally in a MG Magnette and secured a class victory. Evans was unable to start the International Trophy at Donington Park because her car developed a radiator water leak, and set the Ladies' record at the Shelsley Walsh Speed Hill Climb in a supercharged MG Midget.

She entered the 1935 24 Hours of Le Mans and shared the factory-entered No. 55 MG Midget PA with Barbara Skinner in the 1.1 category as part of the three-car, six-woman team dubbed the "George Eyston's Dancing Daughters". The car finished in 25th overall and tenth in class after completing 136 laps. Evans finished seventh at the JCC International Trophy Race at Brooklands but missed out on setting the Outer Course layout record before the conclusion of the season. She was also one of three women to participate in the Brooklands 500 motor race after the British Racing Drivers' Club allowed women to compete but retired with valve trouble. At the end of the season, MG ended their racing programme and thus withdrew from motor racing.

In 1936, Evans drove a R-type all-independently-sprung MG Midget was in the Brooklands International Trophy when her car caught fire and crashed exiting the banking, suffering heavy damage to the car. She was due to participate in the RAC Tourist Trophy at the Ards Circuit near Belfast but her co-driver Alan Phipps (whom she was acting as the reserve for) crashed their two-litre Aston Martin on the first lap of the race and she was unable to drive the car. Evans's final motor race was at the Shelsley Walsh Speed Hill Climb in September 1936. She moved to the United States after marriage and qualified as a pilot. In 1953, Evans injured two ribs, sprained her ankle and sustained bruising in a crash at a sports car meet in Denver, Colorado.

== Personal life ==
Evans was married to the American-born racing driver Alan Phipps from 29 July 1936 to 9 October 1953. There were three children of the marriage. She later remarried to George Boyer in the 1950s. Evans suddenly collapsed at her home in La Jolla and died at a San Diego, California hospital on 18 April 1982. A memorial service for her took place on 21 April in La Jolla.

== Legacy ==
The National Portrait Gallery, London holds a series of four portrait photographs of Evans in their collection.

== 24 Hours of Le Mans results ==
Year	Team	Co-Driver	Car	Class	Laps	Pos.	Class Pos.
1935	(United Kingdom) Capt. G.E.T. Eyston (United Kingdom) MG Cars	(United Kingdom) Barbara Skinner	MG PA Midget	1.1	136	25th	10th
