= Gordon Simpson =

Gordon Simpson may refer to:

- Gordon Simpson (Australian politician) (1929–2017), Australian politician
- Gordon Simpson (judge) (1894–1987), Justice of the Supreme Court of Texas
- Gordon Simpson (rugby union) (born 1971), New Zealand-born rugby player
- Gord Simpson (1928–2019), Canadian ice hockey defenceman
- Eva Gordon-Simpson (1901–1980), British racing driver
