= 1935 24 Hours of Le Mans =

13th 24 Hours of Le Mans endurance race

| Previous: 1934 | Next: 1936 |
Index: Races | Winners

The 1935 24 Hours of Le Mans was the 13th Grand Prix of Endurance. It took place at the Circuit de la Sarthe on 15 and 16 June 1935. The race was won by Johnny Hindmarsh and Luis Fontés in a British Lagonda, breaking the run of four consecutive Alfa Romeo victories. A record number of 58 starters included a record number of British cars, at 37, dominating the smaller classes. Another notable point of the entry was four all-female cars, and a Le Mans record of ten women competing.

A strong quartet of privateer Alfa Romeos, including previous winners Raymond Sommer, Earl Howe and Luigi Chinetti, were the favourites. Up against them for outright victory were five Bugattis, two Lagondas and a debut for French manufacturer Delahaye. Most of the race was run in poor weather with intermittent showers, though fortunately there were no serious accidents. Sommer initially had the lead for most of the first quarter of the race, until delayed by engine issues and, with his co-driver too sick to drive, he retired. The race then became a contest between the Hindmarsh/Fontés Lagonda and the Alfa Romeos charging back up the field after early delays. The big Bugatti of Roger Labric was also consistently running among them in the top-three.

Just after half-time, everything changed over the next hour, as successively Labric, Chinetti and then Howe all were forced out with engine or suspension issues. As a drizzly dawn broke, it was the Alfa of Pierre Louis-Dreyfus only a half-lap ahead of the Lagonda, and the lead continued to swap through the morning as the two cars pitted. When the Alfa lost two laps fixing a misfire late in the morning, it gave the British drivers a comfortable margin. However, with less than an hour to go, they were struck with their own engine problems. Forced to tour gently just to make the finish, Louis-Dreyfus passed them, which was mistakenly interpreted as going into the lead when, in fact, it had only got him back onto the lead lap. By the time, that error was picked up there was only ten minutes to run and Fontés made it home to win by a half-lap.

By dint of good reliability, the smaller British cars of Aston Martin and Riley had pushed into the top-five. The works Aston of Brackenbury/Martin took a fine third-place overall and won both the Index of Performance and Biennial Cup. British cars set new distance records in the 2-litre (MG), 1.5-litre (Aston Martin) and 1-litre classes (Singer). All three MGs of George Eyston's all-female team finished, virtually in formation, after running trouble-free to a careful schedule.

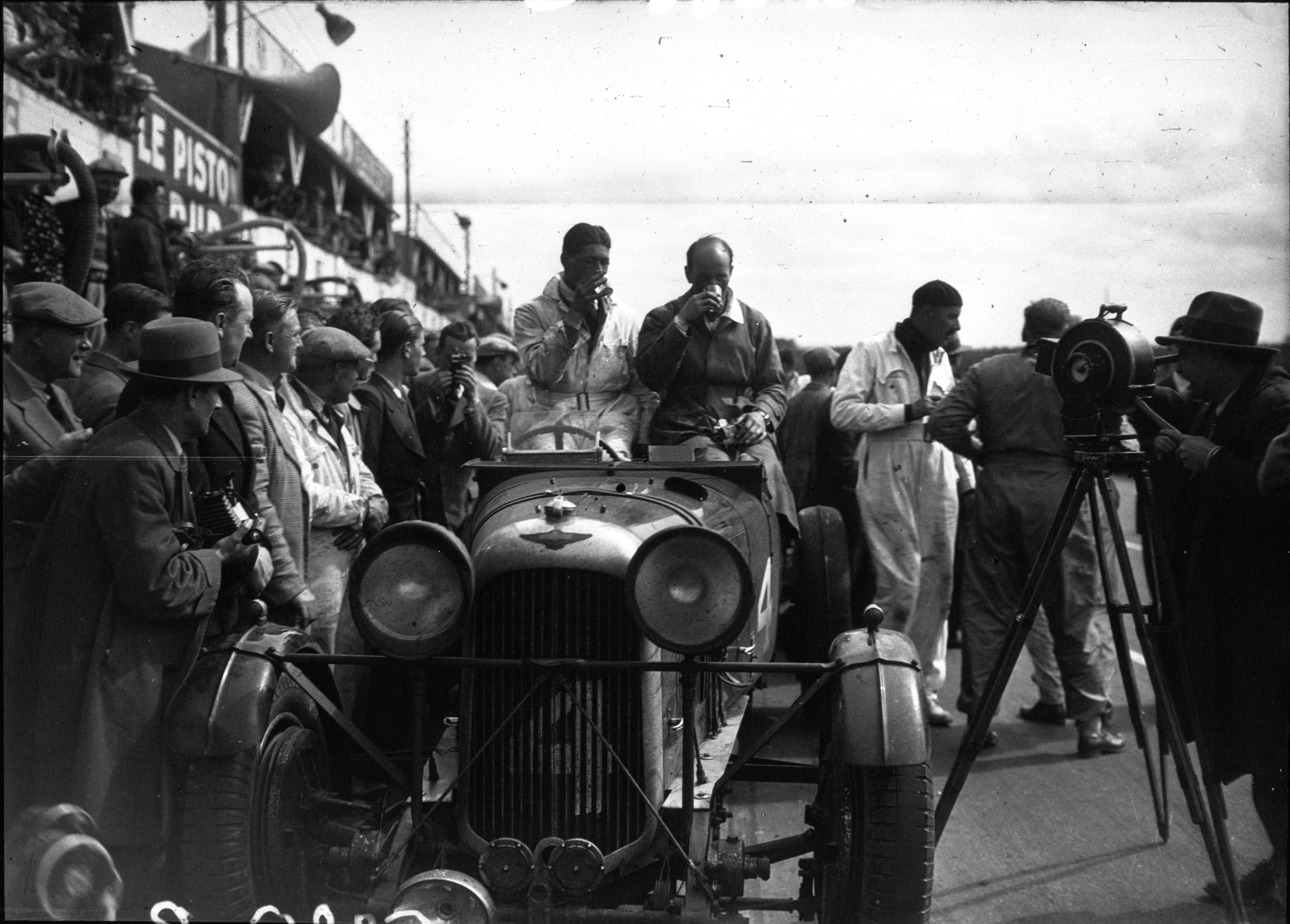
Fontés (L) and Hindmarsh (R), sitting onboard their winning Lagonda

== Regulations and organization ==
To avoid controversy and argument, this year the Automobile Club de l'Ouest (ACO) introduced a mathematical formula to calculate the target distances for the Index of Performance. This formula was based on engine size, although a variation on the basic equation was used for 2-seater cars under 1.5-litres. This mainly impacted on the smaller engine cars, adding around 8-12 laps to their targets. The class-divisions remained as per the previous year, except for the over 3-litre class. An additional bracket at 4-litres was included, so creating a new engine class.

There were no significant updates or changes to the track or facilities this year. Numbered circles were painted onto the pit straight opposite where the cars would line up, to deter drivers from jumping the start. As usual, the petrol supplier alternated and this year, Shell offered four fuel choices: its regular fuel, 100% benzole, a 70/30 blend of the two and a 70/15/15 blend of the regular with benzole and ethanol. As an incentive, the French Office National des Combustibiles Liquides offered a FF10,000 bonus prize to a team who won either the Index of Performance or Biennial Cup using the ternary fuel.

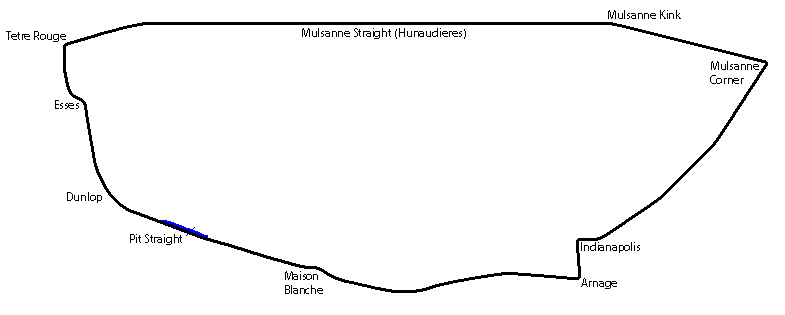
Le Mans in 1935

| Engine size | 1934 Minimum distance | 1935 Minimum distance | Average speed | Equivalent laps |
|---|---|---|---|---|
| 6000cc+ | 2,640 km (1,640 mi) | 2,619 km (1,627 mi) | 109.1 km/h (67.8 mph) | 194.1 laps |
| 5000cc | 2,632 km (1,635 mi) | 2,600 km (1,600 mi) | 108.3 km/h (67.3 mph) | 192.7 laps |
| 4000cc | 2,610 km (1,620 mi) | 2,569 km (1,596 mi) | 107.0 km/h (66.5 mph) | 190.4 laps |
| 3000cc | 2,450 km (1,520 mi) | 2,509 km (1,559 mi) | 104.5 km/h (64.9 mph) | 186.0 laps |
| 2000cc | 2,200 km (1,400 mi) | 2,350 km (1,460 mi) | 97.9 km/h (60.8 mph) | 174.2 laps |
| 1500cc | 2,100 km (1,300 mi) | 2,225 km (1,383 mi) | 92.7 km/h (57.6 mph) | 164.9 laps |
| 1100cc | 1,880 km (1,170 mi) | 2,017 km (1,253 mi) | 84.0 km/h (52.2 mph) | 149.5 laps |
| 750cc | 1,700 km (1,100 mi) | 1,743 km (1,083 mi) | 72.6 km/h (45.1 mph) | 129.2 laps |

== Entries ==
A total of 59 cards were entered for a scrutineering at the start of the race week, the largest entry for a pre-war edition of the 24 Hours of Le Mans. At the time, Mercedez-Benz and Auto Union were dominant in Grand Prix racing, while Alfa Romeo and Bugatti increasingly focused on sports car competition. Both manufacturers were strongly represented in the race.

Having equalled Bentley's total of four Le Mans victories the previous year, Alfa Romeo sought to surpass that record. Other entrants in the larger-engine classes included La Lorraine and Duesenburg, as well as newer competitors such as Delahaye, Talbot, and Lagonda.

Building upon the growing perception that Le Mans was a “British race held in France”, British brands dominated the medium- and small-engine classes.They comprised 36 of those 44 entrants, including works entries from Austin, Riley and Singer. With the two Lagondas it was a record number of British cars. The 59 British drivers at this race is also, to date, a record participation from the UK>. Georges Durand, General-Secretary of the ACO, wrote:

"We can't help noticing that the British entries are in the majority, because their government has banned road racing on mainland Britain. British constructors understand that racing encourages progress, but they aren’t content to stand by with folded arms."

By contrast, there were only single entries from the French manufacturers aside from Bugatti who had seven cars represented. There were a total of 26 works-supported entries this year. Also of note were the ten women entered, including three all-female pairings. This is still, to date, the highest number of women competing in one Le Mans. It was also the first instance of a husband-and-wife racing at Le Mans (albeit in different cars) with Tommy and Elsie Wisdom.

After one of the highest number of finishers in the previous year's race, there were sixteen cars turning up to contest the Coupe Bienniale. These included four Aston Martins, three Singers and fully six Rileys.

| Category | Entries | Classes |
|---|---|---|
| Large-sized engines | 16 / 15 | over 3-litre |
| Medium-sized engines | 9 / 8 | 1.5 to 3-litre |
| Small-sized engines | 35 / 35 | up to 1.5-litre |
| Total entrants | 60 / 58 | |

- Note: The first number is the number of entries, the second the number who started. Using the equivalent engine-size, with supercharged engines having the x1.4 conversion factor

=== Over 2-litre entries ===
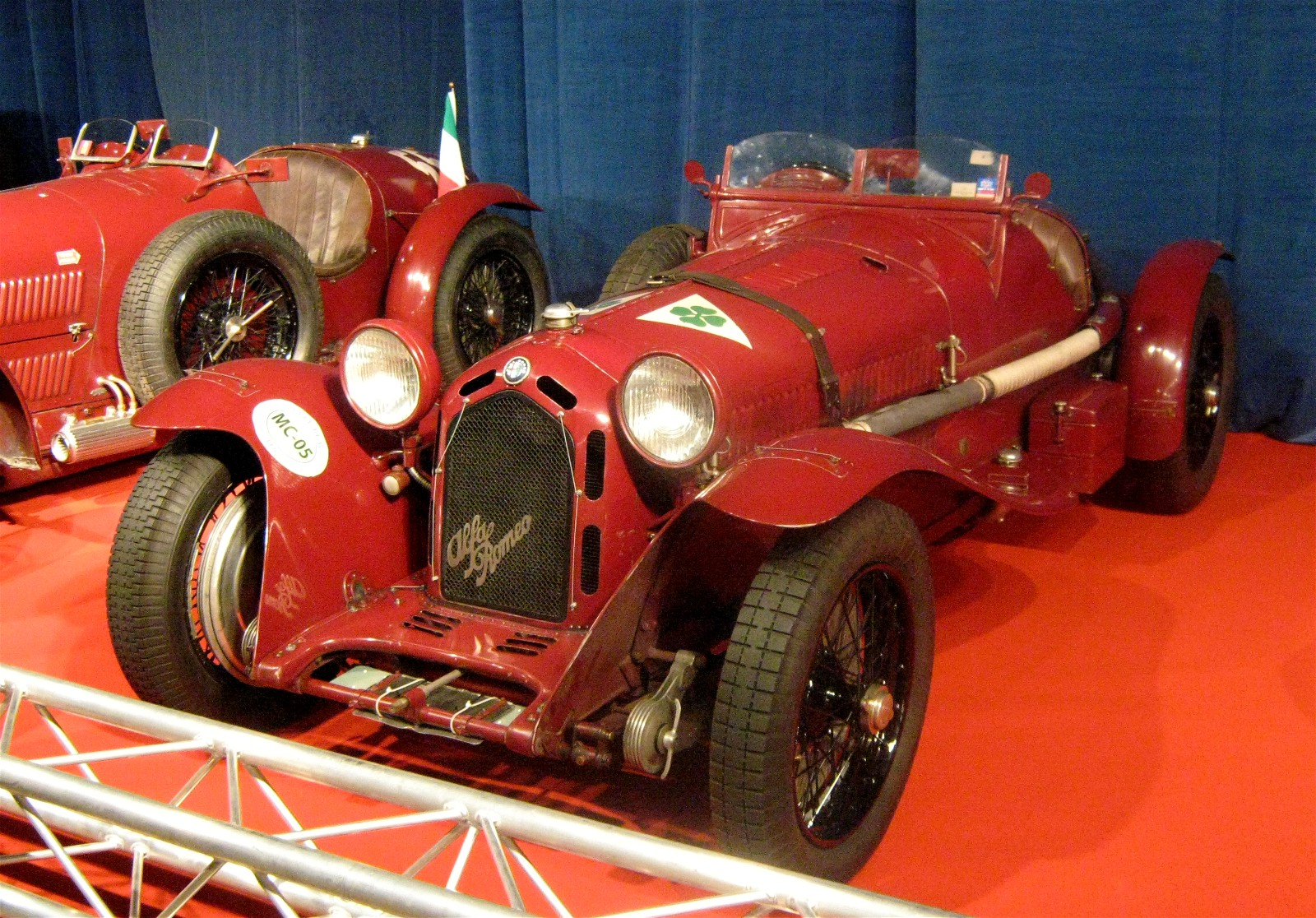
Alfa Romeo 8C-2300 Monza Sport

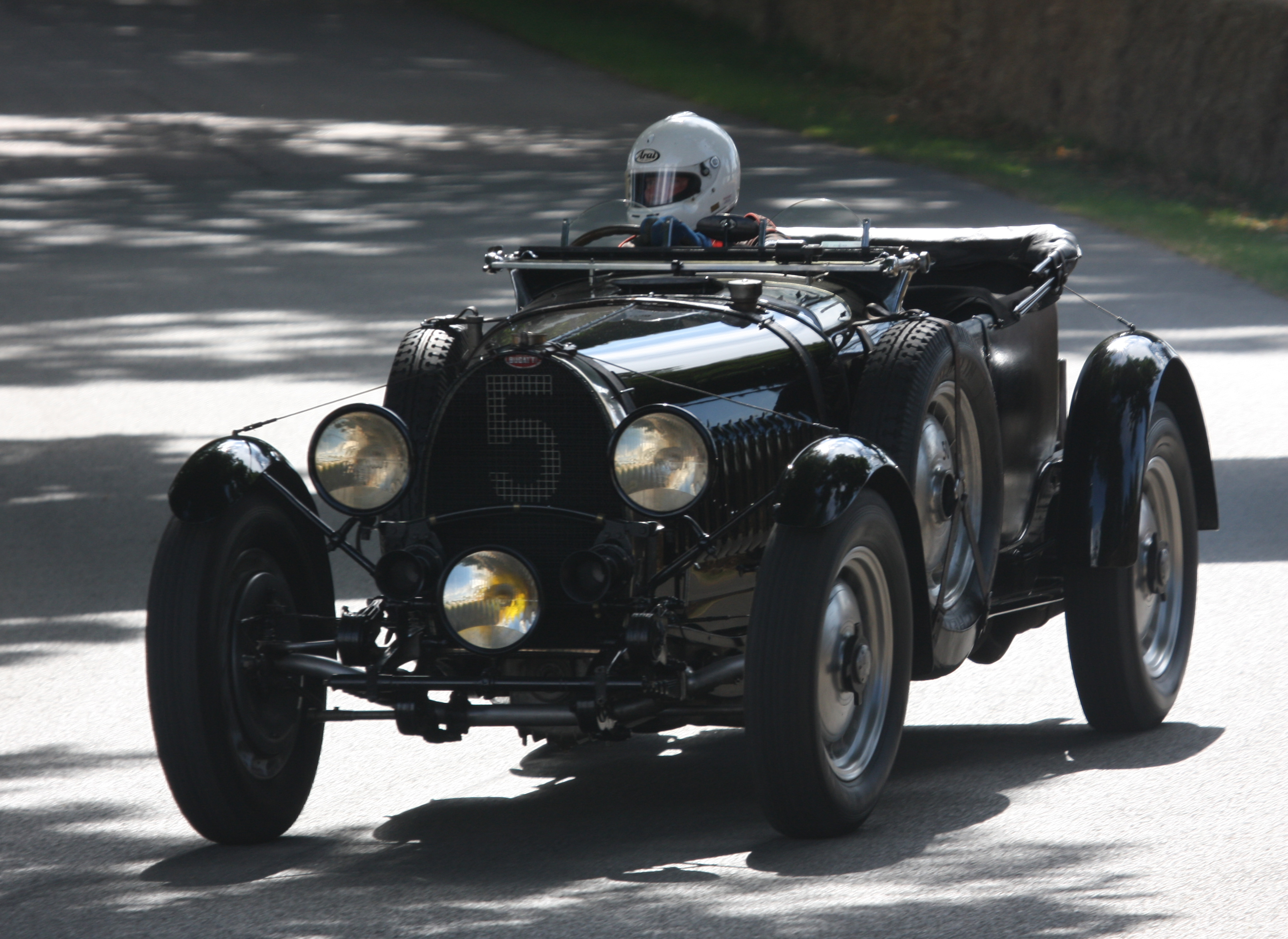
Bugatti Type 50 Sports

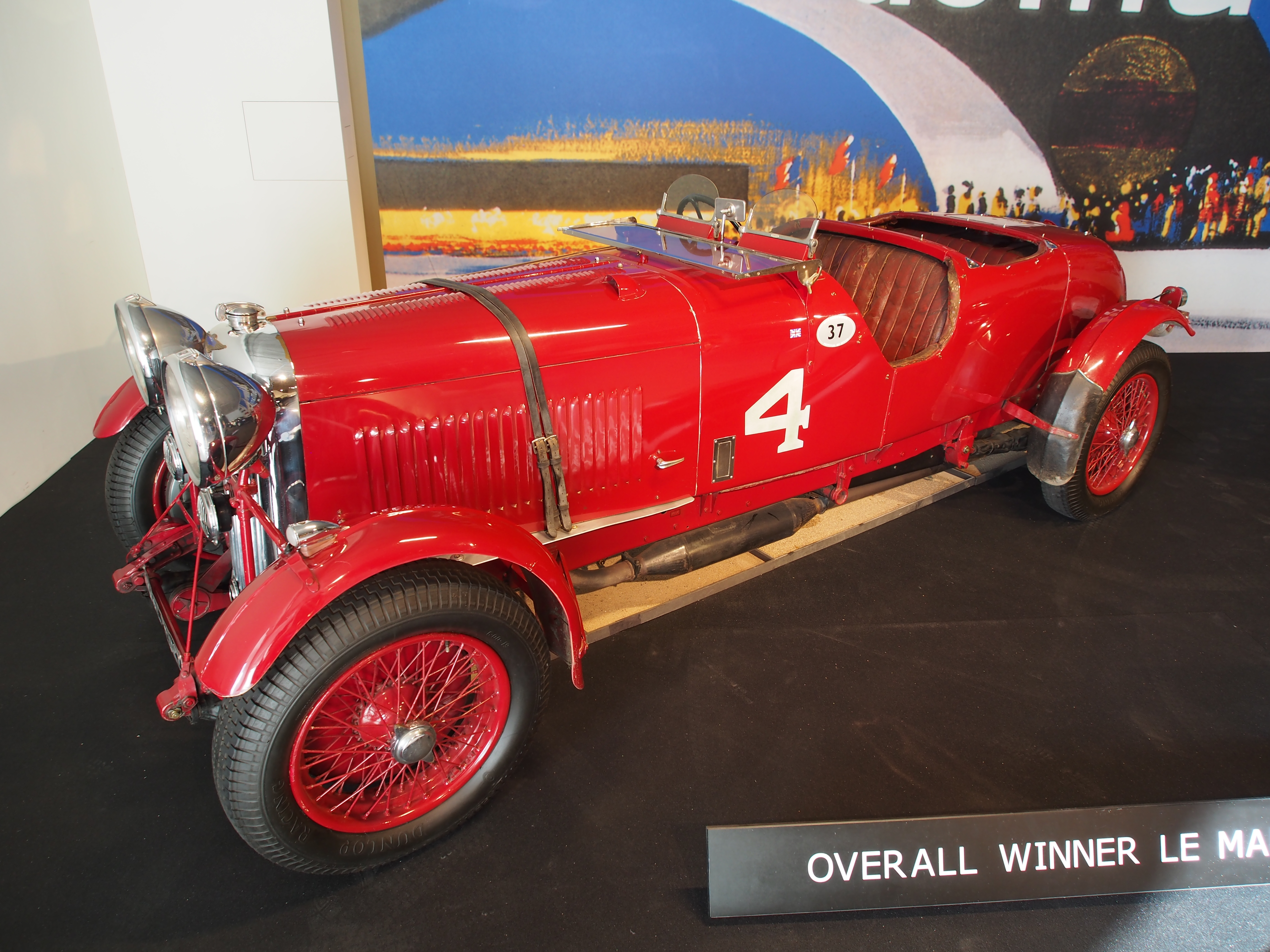
Lagonda M45 Rapide

The Alfa Romeo 8C had been the premier car in the 1930s races. This year, four cars were entered by privateers, but the driver quality still made them the cars to beat. Last year's winner Luigi Chinetti was paired with the Monégasque Jacques Gastaud. Raymond Sommer, another two-time winner, also had a gentleman-driver as his partner – Raymond d'Estrez Saugé. The British lord, Earl Howe (running with Brian Lewis, Baron Essendon) brought his three-year old Alfa that he ran the year before. Wealthy Parisian banker Pierre Louis-Dreyfus (racing under the name "Heldé", onomatopoeic of his initials ‘L-D’) enticed veteran Henri Stoffel as his co-driver. After four comfortable wins in succession, Alfa Romeo were confident for their fifth win. There was also an Alfa Romeo 6C-1750 SS entered by Guy Weisweiller. Part of a rich Parisian banking family, he raced under the pseudonym "Guy Don". Driving a 1933, late-model, version of the classic 6C, it was now tuned to put out 85 bhp from the supercharged 1774cc engine.

Bugatti's largest entry yet at Le Mans saw eight cars arrive. The two biggest were ex-works Type 50 Sports, with their mighty 5-litre supercharged engines. Racing journalist Roger Labric once again had works support, and their driver Pierre Veyron. The other was owned by the wealthy French aristocrat Charles Richer-Delavau. French film director Georges d'Arnoux had raced earlier in the decade but this was his first Le Mans. He shared a 2.3-litre Type 55 with fellow-nobleman Pierre Merlin. There were two touring models – a Type 44 and an elegant new Type 57. This had the supercharged straight-8 engine from the Type 59 Grand Prix car bored out to 3.3-litres giving 135 bhp. It was owned and entered by Franco-Brazilian Pedro Bernardo de Souza Dantas. Three French Bugatti drivers, Max Fourny, Albert Blondeau and Bernard Chaudé, had formed a new racing team. The Écurie Argo had two entries: a 2.3-litre Type 51 modified with aerodynamic bodywork over the rear suspension would be driven by Fourny and Chaudé. The other was a Type 35 chassis fitted with a supercharged 2-litre engine with similar bodywork applied. Blondeau had Paul Vallée as his co-driver. The final Bugatti was a Type 51A driven by champion boxer Louis Villeneuve. However, the 1.4 equivalence modifier put the supercharged 1.5-litre engine up against 3-litre cars.

The Fox & Nicholl racing team had raced a Lagonda in the 1929 race, and then scored a successive trio of third places with a British Talbot with works backing. Arthur Fox had renewed the deal with Lagonda even though the company had been placed in liquidation. With works support, he arrived with the new M45 Rapide. This version of the M45 tourer had a 4.5-litre Meadows straight-6 engine that put out 140 bhp. Two cars with a shorter wheelbase were entered, each fitted with a 120-litre fuel tank, improved brakes and suspension. Fox had one car for his team regular Squadron Leader Johnny Hindmarsh and new member Luis Fontés (English son of a wealthy Portuguese shipping executive), while the other had former "Bentley Boy" Dudley Benjafield alongside Sir Roland Gunter.

Delahaye had competed in some of the earliest races at the turn of the century, but had gone back to making standard saloons. But they chose to make a bold change into the high-end sports car market after the recession. Encouraged by wealthy heiress Lucy O'Reilly Schell to develop a car for hill-climb racing, the company set up a competition department. That, in turn, led to them entering Le Mans for the first time this year. The Type 138 Sports had a 3.2-litre engine race-tuned to give 100 bhp. Five cars were built, one for Lucy Schell and another sold to Parisian Henri Toulouse. Bringing it to Le Mans for its first race, he had pro-driver Marcel Mongin beside him. Prince Nicholas of Romania returned for a third attempt with the big 7-litre supercharged Duesenberg. Daniel Porthault also came back with his venerable 1926 Lorraine-Dietrich, on the tenth anniversary of its first victory. He had refitted the 3.5-litre car was re-fitted with a lighter, modern body. His co-driver would again be Just-Émile Vernet.

Talbot returned to Le Mans after a 2-year absence, albeit in far different circumstances. The Sunbeam-Talbot-Darracq company was being broken up and Venetian émigré Anthony Lago was targeting the Parisian concern. As director at Talbot he had commissioned a new model – the T120 Baby Sport. The 3-litre engine 90 bhp straight-six engine could get the 4-seat tourer up to 150 kp/h (95 mph). One was entered by its Parisian owner, and Le Mans regular, Auguste Bodoignet.

=== 1- to 2-litre entries ===
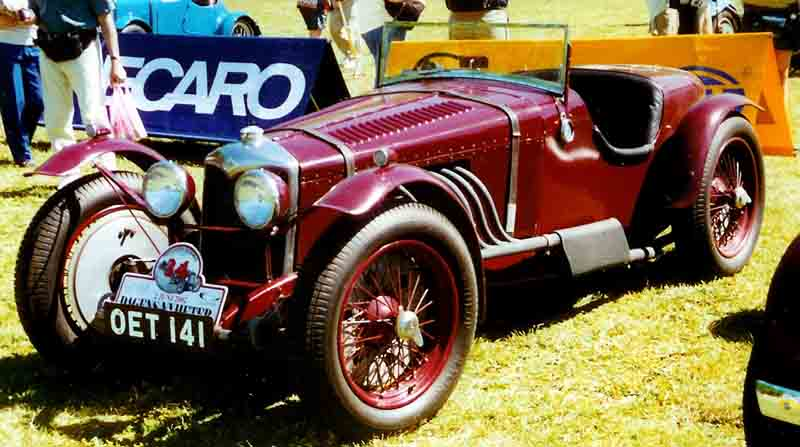
Riley MPH

After a fantastic race the year before, and strong results elsewhere in the season, the Riley team arrived with confidence. Six new cars had been built modelled on the new Riley Sprite mechanical set-up, two of them fitted with its "12/4" 4-cylinder 1496cc engine tuned to put out 70 bhp. The lead car would be driven by Bill van der Becke with Colin Richardson. The second, entered under the name of Dorothy Champney (Victor Riley's wife), had the all-female pair of Kay Petre and Elsie Wisdom. The other four were the older Riley MPH, with its 1458cc straight-six engine. They were crewed by Riley regulars Dixon/Paul, Newsome/Maclure and Frenchmen Sébilleau/Delaroche. The sixth went to privateer Jean Trévoux for his Biennial Cup entry.

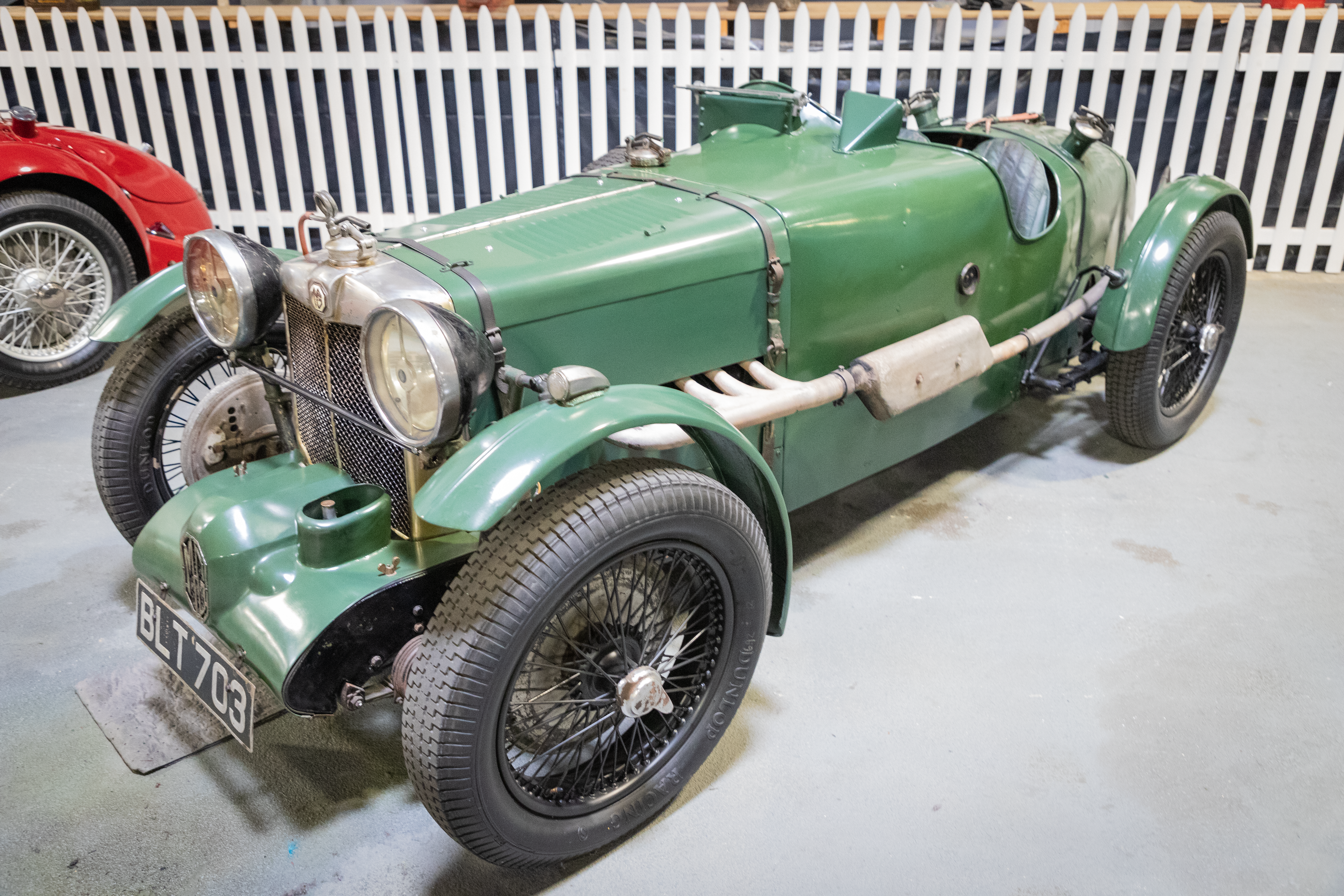
MG K3 Magnette

The supercharged MG Magnette had continued its success in Britain. The boosted 1087cc engine could put out 115 bhp. The works team was not present but three international privateers were entered: John Ludovic Ford and Maurice Baumer returned for a third time and were joined by the cars of Frenchman Philippe Maillard-Brune (who had recently won the Bol d'Or race three weeks earlier) and Dutchman Edmond Hertzberger. A fourth car, in George Eyston's team, did not eventuate.

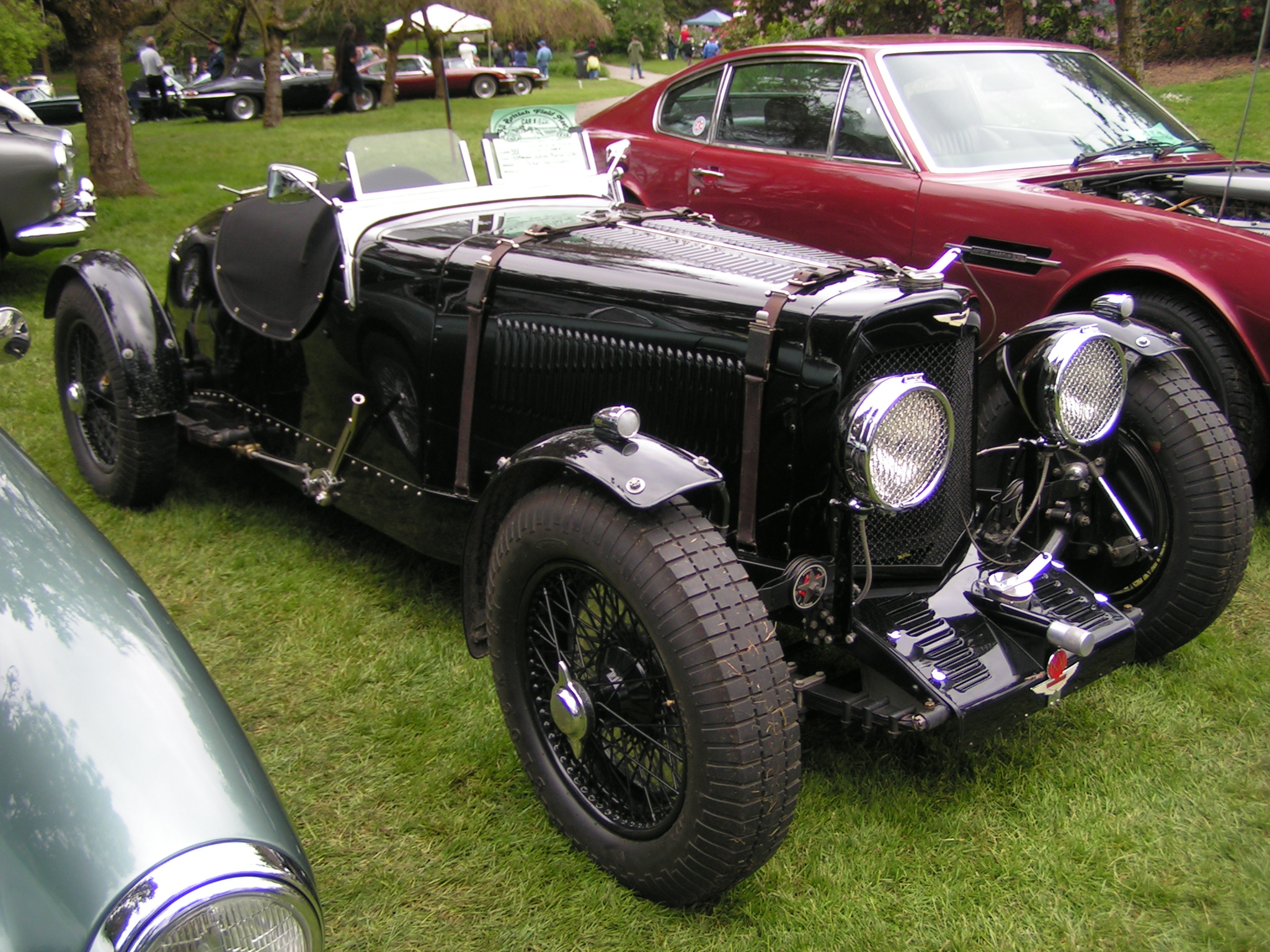
Aston Martin Ulster

Aston Martin mounted a serious assault for class and Coupe honours this year with seven entries. These were all the new Ulster model from Technical Director ”Bert” Bertelli to compete in the 1.5-litre class. As none of the works team had qualified for the Biennial Cup this year, the three works-cars were all entered privately under the drivers who had qualified: John Noël and Reggie Tongue had both run their own cars last year and their cars had regular Aston works drivers. Meanwhile, Roy Eccles had run an MG to fourth with Charles Martin. This year he stepped aside and Martin got Charles Brackenbury as his co-driver. Unusually for British cars, the works Astons were painted red this year, like the Lagondas. The works team was supported by four privateers. Maurice Falkner had acquired an ex-works Aston Martin and had won his class in the Mille Miglia this year with Tommy Clarke. The two paired up again for the French race.

Frazer Nash had started in 1922 but collapsed at the end of the decade in the financial crash. It was then taken over as AFN Limited by Harold "Aldy" Aldington, a sales manager for the company and keen amateur driver. They resumed production, building bespoke sports cars to order, named after motor-racing races. In 1934, AFN took over the defunct Anzani Engineering who made the Gough engine. Two models arrived at Le Mans from British gentleman drivers. The Shelsley was named after the well-established English hill climb event. It had a 1496cc Gough engine fitted with twin Centric superchargers that could make 95 bhp and get up to a speed of 160 kp/h (100 mph). The other entry was a TT Replica which had the same engine, though normally aspirated.

The class was rounded out with a Derby L8, driven by notable female racer, Gwenda Stewart, who had worked with the Parisian Automobiles Derby company to develop the car. Just a single Amilcar arrived this year. Clément-Auguste Martin's Équipe de l’Ours team again worked with Georges Boursin. Normally in a 1.1-litre class, the 1079cc side-valve engine instead made it the smallest in class.

=== up to 1-litre entries ===
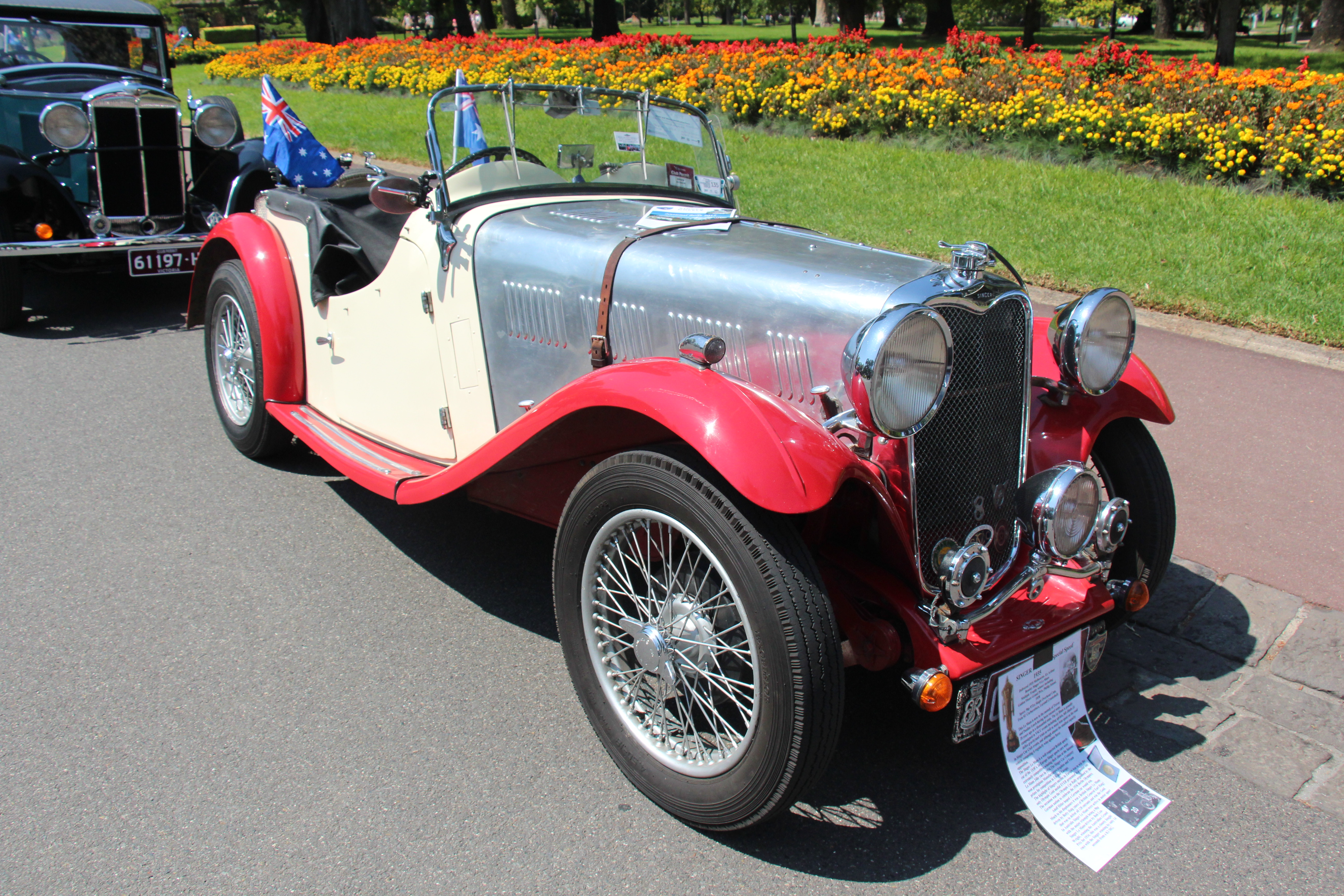
Singer Nine Le Mans

A veritable squadron of Singers turned up to defend the class win from 1934. Eight were entered, including three new works entries for the Coupe Bienniale. Mindful of the British production regulations, the new model was called the "Nine Le Mans Replica". The racing-spec engine now put out 50 bhp. Fitted with uprated suspension and a stiffened chassis, it was almost 200 kg lighter than the standard "Nine Le Mans” and could get up to 150 kp/h (95 mph). Le Mans winner and noted journalist Sammy Davis was brought in as team manager to allow Singer's racing manager, Stan Barnes, to drive. His co-driver was Alf Langley, while Stan's brother Donald again raced with journalist Tommy Wisdom, and Norman Black/Roddy Baker ran the other two cars. They were supported by three British and two French privateers running last year's Nine Le Mans model.

This year, the MG company worked with well-known speed-record champion George Eyston to prepare three all-female crews to run the Midget PA in the 1-litre class. This was no publicity stunt, as the women were all high-profile drivers with strong racing history: Scottish Margaret Allan had won races at Brooklands driving a Bentley, and was teamed up with Corinne Eaton who had entered the 1932 Le Mans for Fox & Nichol but crashed en route to the event. Her husband, Hugh, had finished third with the same team in the 1930 race.Australian Joan Richmond had won the 1932 inaugural Brooklands 1000 miles with Elsie Wisdom. For this event, she raced with Eva Gordon-Simpson, who had been in the Triumph rally team with Eaton and Allan. The third car was driven by Doreen Evans and Barbara Skinner. A fourth, privateer, MG was entered by Philippe Maillard-Brune's team.

At the end of 1934, the SIMCA (Société Industrielle de Mécanique et de Carrosserie Automobile) company had been set up by Fiat S.p.A. to license-manufacturer their cars in France. The predominant model was the 508 "Balilla" (known as the Simca-Fiat 6CV). Italian émigré Amadeo Gordini was one of the service agents. Inspired by the racing success of the 508 in Italy, Gordini worked with SIMCA test driver Henri Louveau to modify the 6CV for racing. They worked on the 995cc engine, boosting its power to 36 bhp, improved the transmission and chassis, while shedding weight. Gordini drove single-handed to win his class in the 24-hour Bol d'Or in May. He used the prizemoney to buy that car and entered it into this race with Carlo Nazzaro (nephew of the great Italian driver Felice Nazzaro) as his co-driver. Another standard Balilla was entered by French Bugatti woman Anne-Cécile Rose-Itier.

The end of the grid was filled by four Austins – the EK75 "Speedy" was the latest sports-version of the Austin 7 and three represented the works team for the first time, while an older EA Sports model was entered by John Carr.

== Practice and Pre-Race ==
During practice, a stone punctured the fuel tank of Labric's Bugatti. After repairs they fitted wooden slats on the floor to stop it re-occurring during the race. The most serious incident during the lead-up happened in the last practice on Friday night. De Valence, in one of the big Bugattis, had his lead mechanic with him when he lost control coming out of the first corner. Cutting the corner, the car then slammed into the outside fence ripping off the front axle, throwing the two onto the track. George Delaroche, in his Riley, had just been overtaken but managed to stop without hitting the unconscious mechanic. Taken to hospital, he was in a coma for 9 days before eventually recovering. The car was a write-off and would not take the start. The weather had been poor through the week. But this boded well for the heavier British cars, negating some of the power of the dominant Alfa Romeos.

== Race ==
=== Start ===
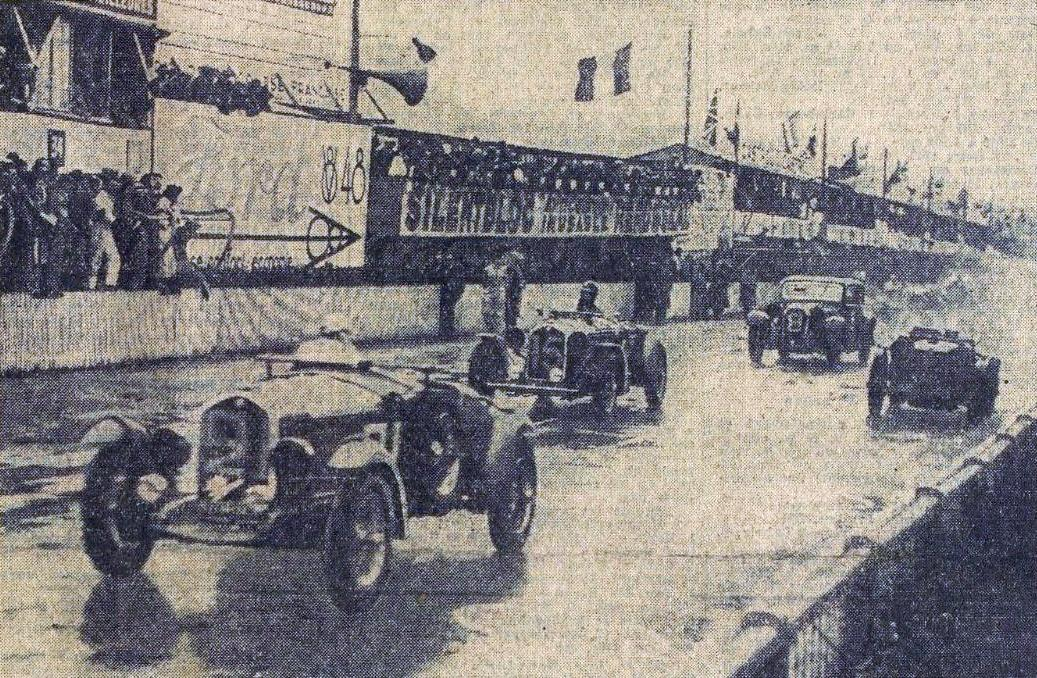
Race start with the Alfa Romeos of “Guy Don” and Sommer leading the Talbot tourer

This year raceday started grey and drizzly, however as the cars formed up on the grid en echelon, the rain eased. The big news was that Raymond Sommer's co-driver had been taken very ill and would be unable to do much driving. Sommer had found Christian d'Auvergne among the spectators – veteran of four Le Mans in the 1920s. However, the ACO officials ruled it was too late for driver substitution, so once again, Sommer was facing a long race on his own. At flagfall, Brian Lewis was the first car to get away, although it was still the big Duesenberg under the Champion bridge first. By the end of the first lap, the Alfa Romeos had got to the front, with Lewis leading Sommer, Chinetti, the Duesenberg and Louis-Dreyfus. After a slow start, Veyron had got the big Bugatti up to sixth, ahead of Hindmarsh's Lagonda. After close racing, Sommer took the lead on lap 3, only to pit to reconnect an errant sparkplug-cable. Then on the fifth lap, Lewis had to pit to get the distributor replaced that cost him over ten minutes and two laps. This left the order as Chinetti, Louis-Dreyfus, Veyron and Hindmarsh as the rain returned. Sommer excelled as it got wetter and had got to second place by 5pm. At the end of that first hour they had all completed 9 laps. A lap behind in 7th was the Bugatti of Viscomte Merlin, then the Aston Martins of Penn-Hughes and Martin with Van der Becke's Riley in 10th. Sommer took the lead soon afterward and then a heavy squall swept the track. Both Louis-Dreyfus and Chinetti pitted for tyres. The latter then had to pit again straight away because oil was leaking onto his rear brakes, costing two laps.

At 6.30pm, the leaders had done their mandatory 24 laps and started pitting. Sommer, facing a long drive, had a double-stint. Despite that, at 7pm, he had put a lap on the field, having done 29 laps. Second was the Fontés Lagonda, with Labric and Stoffel not far behind. The other Lagonda was fifth (27 laps) with Prince Nicolas, and the Brackenbury Aston (leading the 1500cc class) on the same lap. Aston Martin was running 8-9-10 ahead of the Rileys. But in a sharp rainburst, Jim Elwes aquaplaned off at the sweeping first corner, sliding backwards into the roadside fence. When he got back to the pits, the crew just hacked off the wrecked rear-end bodywork and sent him back out again. As dusk fell, in the half-light soon after 9pm Fothringham misjudged the White House corner. Slipping off the road, the Aston Martin rolled, throwing the driver out, and slid down the road. He was very lucky to be narrowly avoided by his team-mate Gardner, and Hindmarsh as the Lagonda came up to lap the two Astons. Then Sammy Newsome dumped his Riley into the sandbank at Arnage. Unfortunately, over-enthusiastic spectators helping him out got the team subsequently disqualified.

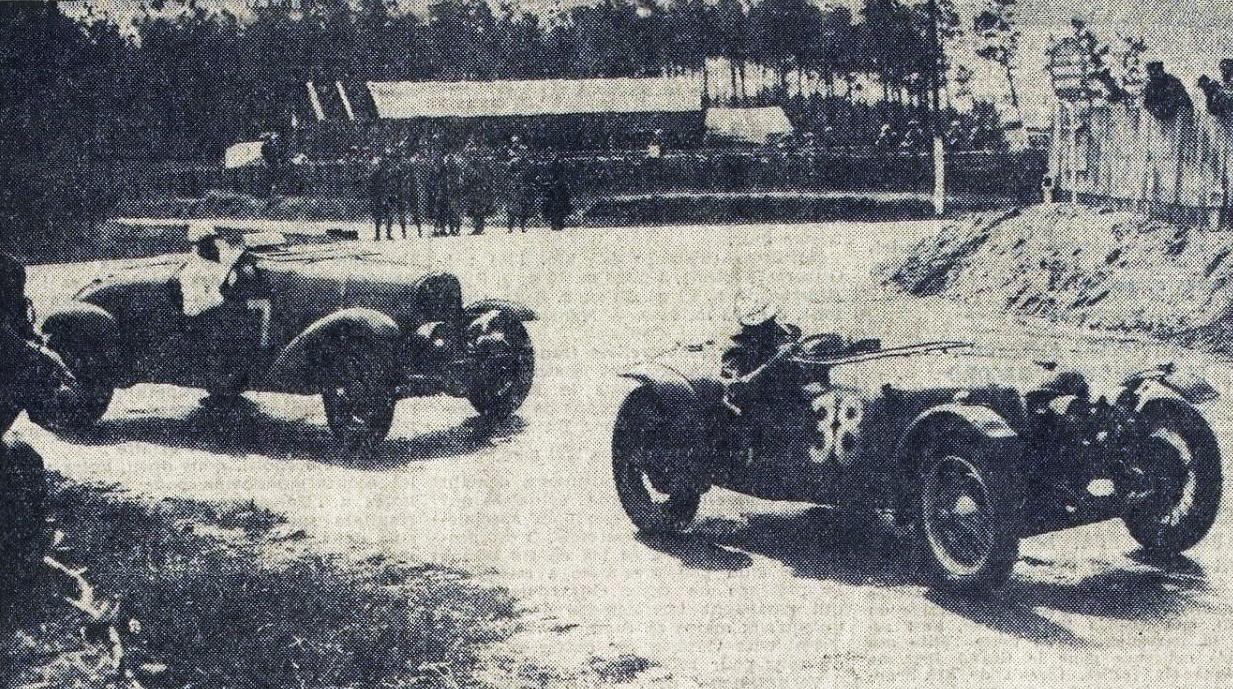
Trévoux's MG leads the Delahaye out of Mulsanne corner

=== Night ===
By the time the rain stopped around 10pm, the Duesenberg was out with ignition failure, after running in the top-10. Then sensationally, with a comfortable lead, Sommer stopped at Mulsanne corner with fuel-flow problems. It took an hour for him to crawl his way back to the pits just on the electric starter motor. During the Alfa's ordeal, Hindmarsh was able to move the Lagonda to the front followed by Stoffel, Labric's Bugatti, Howe and Gastaud all on the same lap. After clearing the fuel-pipe, Sommer rejoined the race seven laps down. Hindmarsh then had to pit to fix his headlamps, smashed by errant stones, losing a lap. Lewis meanwhile, now back in Howe's Alfa, was driving very fast, making up his lost laps. Early into Sunday, he was back into second and then into the lead not long after 1am. Likewise, Chinetti was improving quickly after his early dramas and was up to fifth. At 1.15am, Sommer came into the pits, still with recurring engine issues. Now twenty laps behind, after driving solely for 9 hours he was exhausted. Encouraged on by the partisan crowd he went back out for two more laps, but facing a hopeless situation alone with a sick car, he pulled in again and retired.

At the halfway point, in the drizzle, Howe was leading Veyron by two minutes (113 laps), a lap ahead of Louis-Dreyfus, Hindmarsh. Chinetti/Gastaud were fifth (108) and the other Lagonda of Benjafield/Gunter sixth (106). Martin/Brackenbury ran a strong 7th (105) narrowly leading the 1.5-litre class in their Aston Martin, ahead of the Sébilleau/Delaroche Riley, both comfortably out-running the MG of Maillard-Brune, leading the 2-litre class in 20th (97 laps). Then abruptly over the course of an hour, everything changed: Three laps later Veyron's Bugatti broke its rear axle, and the suspension on Chinetti's Alfa failed. Then at 5.30, Howe had to park his Alfa Romeo with his engine wrecked by a holed piston.

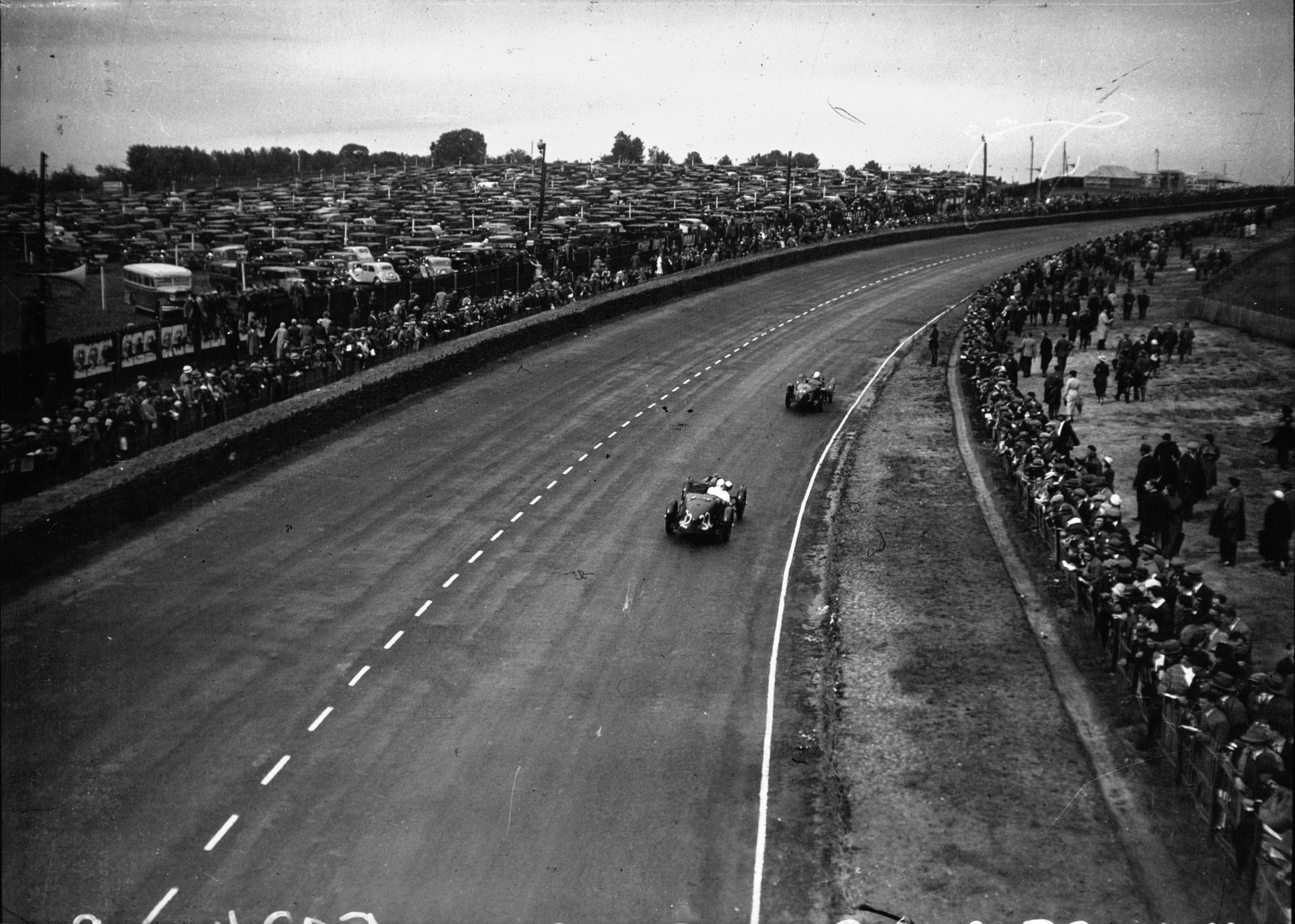
The Riley of Trévoux leading the Thomas Aston Martin through Champion Curve

In the smaller classes, the Aston Martins still held the edge over the pursuing Rileys. The Singer of Black/Baker was in a tight tussle with Maillard-Brune's other car, the supercharged MG in the 1-litre class. They had led through the latter half of the night but were stopped at 8am with a broken starter motor – a fault that had already claimed their stablemate.

=== Morning ===
All this chaos left “Heldé” with a 1-minute, half-lap, lead over Hindmarsh, having covered 131 laps by 6am, as the murky dawn appeared. This grew when the Lagonda had to pit for several repairs. The other Lagonda had eased up into third, while the Delahaye of Toulouse/Mongin was having a trouble-free run and was now fourth. Over the next four hours, Hindmarsh and Fontés drove hard until they were less than a minute behind again at 9am, and then took the lead around 10am. The weather had closed in again: just after 9 o'clock, Georges Delaroche spun his Riley at Arnage, while running sixth. It dug in and rolled, throwing the driver out. He then spent 45 minutes levering the car back onto it wheels, observed by spectators keeping their distance. However, the liquid had leaked out of the battery, and the car would not restart. When those spectators then gave him a push-start, he was destined for disqualification. Soon after that accident, his teammate Freddie Dixon came into the pits with suspension problems. Suddenly the car burst into the flames. No-one was injured but they were out of the race.

Not long after that, Stoffel pitted the Alfa to fix a misfire and a water leak, losing seven minutes fitting new spark plugs. The other Lagonda, of Benjafield/Gunter, was still running third until Benjafield stopped at Tertre Rouge with a mangled gearbox. He ran back to the pit, and then back again with a Lagonda mechanic, who shouted instructions as he did repairs to get it slammed into fourth. Back at the pits there was little options to repair, so they continued on driving with only top gear engaged.

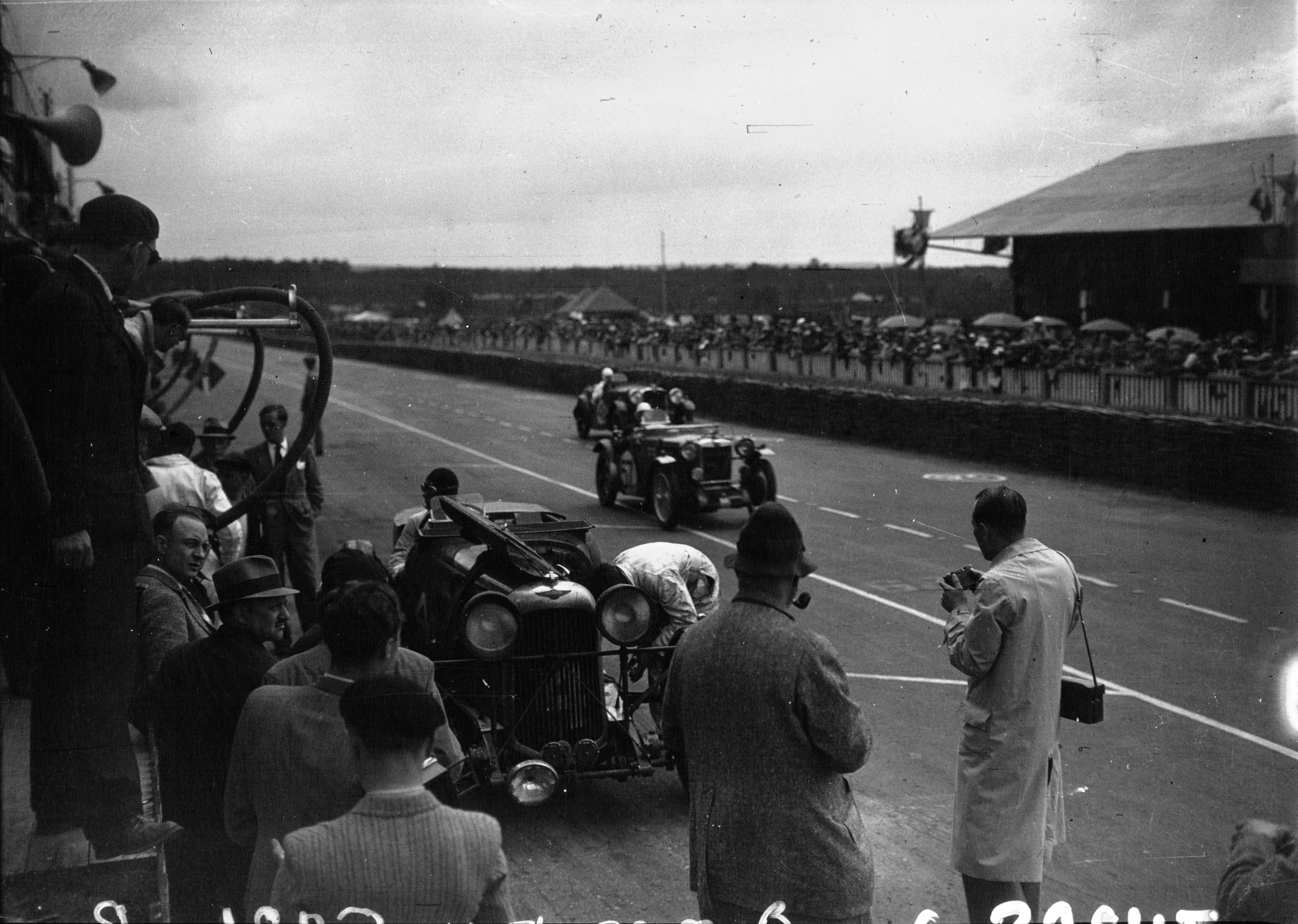
Pitstop for the leading Lagonda

The Talbot saloon had had a consistent race, though it was unable to keep up with the smaller British cars. Through attrition higher up, it was running 11th by mid-morning. However, the brakes were an issue and completely failed for Bodoignet as he cornered at Arnage, sending him up the escape road. As he reversed back onto the track, he almost collided with Stan Barnes in his class-leading Singer. Barnes swerved into the roadside ditch and thumped a concrete post, but was able to carry on. The Talbot struggled on, but at midday, it finally retired with a broken oil-pipe killing the engine.

=== Finish and post-race ===
The race was winding down to a predictable finish, when Fontés pitted at 3pm, off-schedule. At the previous pit-stop, the car had not had its oil topped up. The Lagonda had a two-lap lead but had dangerously low oil pressure. Rules stipulated it was not allowed to be replenished outside the standard pit-windows, so with less than an hour to go, he gingerly left for another lap. He came back with the car running worse, but the pit-crew exhorted him to carry on, albeit cautiously. Louis-Dreyfus was driving hard, and with 20 minutes to go, the public-address loudspeaker reported he was closing in quickly on the Lagonda for the lead. The next lap he overtook Fontés and his pit-team signalled him to ease off, believing him to now be leading. However, at 3.55, the announcer admitted the mistake that the Alfa was, in fact, still 3 minutes behind on the same lap. By then it was too late to catch the ailing Lagonda and it came home for the first British win since Bentley at the start of the decade.

A fine third place overall, and winner of the Index competition, Biennial Cup and 1.5-litre class, went to the Aston Martin of Martin/Brackenbury. They were only 7 laps behind the winners, and a further 7 laps clear of their rivals, the Riley of Van der Becke/Richardson. After initially challenging the Astons, their Riley had been delayed during the night but gradually had come back into contention. The Delahaye finished a lap further back after a solid debut performance, and only got overhauled by the Riley in the last hours. Next was the Alfa Romeo 6C-1750 of Weisweiller/Desvignes. They had run in the top-10 through the night and into sixth by mid-morning, where they continued on to finish, winning the 3-litre class. After its major gearbox problems, the Benjafield/Gunter Lagonda limped home in 13th.

From a bad run the previous year, Aston Martin were rewarded this year with six of their seven cars finishing. Philippe Maillard-Brune won the 2-litre class. His MG Magnette was the only one to finish. After running mid-field through the night, by late-morning had got into the top-10. They finished ninth after a late-race contest with Falkner and Clarke's privateer Aston Martin ended up with them less than half a lap behind. The Singer–MG battle in the 1-litre class went the way of the former, with racing manager Stan Barnes, and Alf Langley, winning by 11 laps from the SIMCA-Fiat of Anne Rose-Itier. After the duelling pair of Black/Baker and Viale/Debille had broken in the morning, they had a comfortable class-lead. Following Barnes' late-morning scare from the Talbot at Arnage, they were able to make it home without further problems and finishing 16th overall. The 5-year-old BNC struggled against the more modern British cars. In what turned out to be the last outing for the model, the team covered the furthest distance yet for a BNC (by 10 laps) and just missed taking 4th in class by 5 kilometres.

Of the 28 finishers, 22 were British cars, and they took the top ten places in the Index of Performance and the top five in the Biennial Cup. All three of George Eyston's all-female teams finished (in 24th, 25th and 26th with just a lap between them), having run to a set schedule. Their only issue had been a single broken tail-light. Two of the little Austins were the last finishers, covering less than two-thirds of the distance of the winner, with the privateer John Carr beating home the works car.

Upon the Lagonda's triumphal return to London, the receivers promptly sold the winning car. Within several months, the Lagonda company was rescued by Alan Good, who brought in W. O. Bentley as designer, whose own company had been bought by Rolls-Royce. They ceased production of the Rapide and Rapier. In October, Luis Fontés, was involved in a fatal road-accident that killed a motorcyclist. At 22-years-old he was the youngest race-winner to date yet already had five convictions for dangerous driving. Found guilty of drink-driving, he was sentenced to three years' imprisonment and banned from driving for 10 years after that. He was killed in an aircraft crash in 1940, while Hindmarsh died in an RAF testing accident in 1938. After twelve years and eight entries, it was the final appearance of La Lorraine. An auspicious run had netted two outright victories in the 1920s. It was also the final Le Mans for BNC (7 years), and Duesenberg and Derby (albeit from a limited time). In contrast, Anthony Lago completed the purchase of the Talbot company, and the success for Amédée Gordini convinced SIMCA to appoint him in the new year for their blooming racing program. A lot more would be heard from those two names in future races at Le Mans.

== Official results ==
=== Finishers ===
Results taken from Quentin Spurring's book, officially licensed by the ACO Class Winners are in Bold text.

| Pos | Class | No. | Team | Drivers | Chassis | Engine | Tyre | Target distance* | Laps |
|---|---|---|---|---|---|---|---|---|---|
| 1 | **5.0** | **4** | **(United Kingdom) Arthur W. Fox** | **(United Kingdom) Johnny Hindmarsh** **(United Kingdom) Luis Fontés** | Lagonda M45 Rapide | Meadows 4.5L S6 | **D** | 192 [B] | 222 |
| 2 | 5.0 ** | 12 | (France) P. Louis-Dreyfus (private entrant) | (France) "Heldé" (Pierre Louis-Dreyfus) (France) Henri Stoffel | Alfa Romeo 8C-2300 LM | Alfa Romeo 2.3L S8 supercharged | **D** | 188 | 222 |
| 3 | **1.5** | **29** | **(United Kingdom) R. Eccles** (private entrant) (United Kingdom) Aston Martin Ltd | **(United Kingdom) Charlie Martin** **(United Kingdom) Charles Brackenbury** | Aston Martin Ulster | Aston Martin 1494cc S4 | **D** | 165 [B] | 215 |
| 4 | 1.5 | 24 | (United Kingdom) Riley (Coventry) Ltd | (United Kingdom) Alex “Bill” van der Becke (United Kingdom) Colin Richardson | Riley Racing MPH 12/4 | Riley 1496cc S4 | **D** | 165 [B] | 208 |
| 5 | 5.0 | 7 | (France) "Michel Paris" (private entrant) | (France) "Michel Paris" (Henri Toulouse) (France) Marcel Mongin | Delahaye 138 Sport | Delahaye 3.2L S6 | ? | 188 | 207 |
| 6 | **3.0** ** | **21** | **(France) “Guy Don”** (private entrant) | **(France) “Guy Don” (Guy Weisweiller)** **(France) Jean Desvignes** | Alfa Romeo 6C-1750 SS | Alfa Romeo 1774cc S6 supercharged | **D** | 182 | 204 |
| 7 | 1.5 | 38 | (France) J. Trévoux (private entrant) | (France) Jean Trévoux (France) René Carrière | Riley Racing MPH | Riley 1458cc S6 | **D** | 165 [B] | 204 |
| 8 | 1.5 | 33 | (United Kingdom) M. Falkner (private entrant) | (United Kingdom) Maurice Falkner (United Kingdom) Tom Clarke | Aston Martin Ulster | Aston Martin 1494cc S4 | **D** | 165 | 202 |
| 9 | **2.0** ** | **42** | **(France) P. Maillard-Brune** (private entrant) | **(France) Philippe Maillard-Brune** **(France) Charles Druck** | MG K3 Magnette | MG 1082cc S4 supercharged | **D** | 157 | 202 |
| 10 | 1.5 | 32 | (United Kingdom) C.T. Thomas (private entrant) | (United Kingdom) C.T. “Tommy” Thomas (United Kingdom) Michael Kenyon | Aston Martin Ulster | Aston Martin 1494cc S4 | **D** | 165 | 199 |
| 11 | 1.5 | 31 | (United Kingdom) P.L. Donkin (private entrant) | (United Kingdom) Peter Donkin (United Kingdom) Lord Malcolm Douglas-Hamilton | Aston Martin Ulster | Aston Martin 1494cc S4 | **D** | 165 | 199 |
| 12 | 1.5 | 27 | (United Kingdom) J. Noël (private entrant) (United Kingdom) Aston Martin Ltd | (United Kingdom) Mortimer Morris-Goodall (United Kingdom) Jim Elwes | Aston Martin Ulster | Aston Martin 1494cc S4 | **D** | 165 [B] | 196 |
| 13 | 5.0 | 14 | (United Kingdom) Arthur W. Fox (United Kingdom) D. Benjafield (private entrant) | (United Kingdom) Dr Dudley Benjafield (United Kingdom) Sir Roland Gunter | Lagonda M45 Rapide | Meadows 4.5L S6 | **D** | 192 | 196 |
| 14 | 3.0 ** | 26 | (France) L. Villeneuve (private entrant) | (France) Louis Villeneuve (France) André Vagniez | Bugatti Type 51A | Bugatti 1453cc S8 supercharged | **D** | 177 | 195 |
| 15 | 1.5 | 30 | (United Kingdom) R.P. Gardner (private entrant) | (United Kingdom) Goldie Gardner (United Kingdom) Alfred Beloë | Aston Martin Ulster | Aston Martin 1494cc S4 | **D** | 165 [B] | 190 |
| 16 | **1.0** | **51** | **(United Kingdom) F.S. Barnes** **(United Kingdom) Singer Motors Ltd** | **(United Kingdom) F. Stanley Barnes** **(United Kingdom) Alf Langley** | Singer Nine Le Mans Replica | Singer 973cc S4 | **D** | 144 [B] | 183 |
| 17 | 1.5 | 34 | (France) A. Hénon (private entrant) | (France) André Hénon (France) Roger Rès | Singer Le Mans 1 1/2 Litre | Singer 1496cc S4 | **D** | 165 | 177 |
| 18 | 1.0 | 45 | (France) Mme A.-C. Rose-Itier (private entrant) | (France) Anne-Cécile Rose-Itier (France) Robert Jacob | SIMCA-Fiat 508 Balilla Sport | Fiat 999cc S4 | **D** | 145 [B] | 172 |
| 19 | 1.0 | 48 | (United Kingdom) G. Hendy (private entrant) | (United Kingdom) Gordon Hendy (United Kingdom) James Boulton | Singer Nine Sports | Singer 973cc S4 | **D** | 144 | 171 |
| 20 | 1.0 | 54 | (United Kingdom) A.R. Marsh (private entrant) | (United Kingdom) Arthur Marsh (United Kingdom) Trevor Guest | Singer Nine Le Mans | Singer 973cc S4 | **D** | 144 | 160 |
| 21 | 1.0 | 46 | (France) G. Duval (private entrant) | (France) Gaston Duval (France) Jean Treunet | BNC Type 527 Sport | Ruby 993cc S4 | **D** | 145 | 160 |
| 22 | 1.0 | 52 | (France) R. Gaillard (private entrant) | (France) Raymond Gaillard (France) Maurice Aimé | Singer Nine Le Mans | Singer 973cc S4 | **D** | 144 | 159 |
| 23 | 1.0 | 53 | (France) J. Savoye (private entrant) | (France) Jacques Savoye (France) Guy Lapchin | Singer Nine Le Mans | Singer 973cc S4 | **D** | 144 | 155 |
| 24 | 1.0 | 56 | (United Kingdom) Capt. G.E.T. Eyston (United Kingdom) MG Cars | (Australia) Joan Richmond (United Kingdom) Evelin Gordon-Simpson | MG Midget PA | MG 846cc S4 | **D** | 136 | 153 |
| 25 | 1.0 | 55 | (United Kingdom) Capt. G.E.T. Eyston (United Kingdom) MG Cars | (United Kingdom) Doreen Evans (United Kingdom) Barbara Skinner | MG Midget PA | MG 846cc S4 | **D** | 136 | 153 |
| 26 | 1.0 | 57 | (United Kingdom) Capt. G.E.T. Eyston (United Kingdom) MG Cars | (United Kingdom) Margaret Allan (United Kingdom) Corinne Eaton | MG Midget PA | MG 846cc S4 | **D** | 136 | 152 |
| 27 | **750** | **62** | **(United Kingdom) J. Carr** (private entrant) | **(United Kingdom) John Carr** **(United Kingdom) John Barbour** | Austin 7 Sports Speedy | Austin 749cc S4 | **D** | 130 | 141 |
| 28 | 750 | 60 | (United Kingdom) Austin Motor Co. | (United Kingdom) Charles Dodson (United Kingdom) R.J. Richardson | Austin 7 EK75 Speedy | Austin 749cc S4 | **D** | 130 | 138 |

=== Did not finish ===
| Pos | Class | No | Team | Drivers | Chassis | Engine | Tyre | Target distance* | Laps | Reason |
|---|---|---|---|---|---|---|---|---|---|---|
| DNF | 3.0 | 8 | (France) Anthony Lago (France) A. Bodoignet (private entrant) | (France) Auguste Bodoignet (France) Gabriel Constant | Talbot T150 Baby Sport | Talbot 3.0L S6 | ? | 186 | 181 | engine (20 hr) |
| DSQ | 1.5 | 36 | (United Kingdom) Riley (Coventry) Ltd | (France) Jean Sébilleau (France) Georges Delaroche | Riley Nine MPH | Riley 1458cc S6 | **D** | 164 [B] | 149 | outside assistance (18 hr) |
| DNF | 1.5 | 35 | (United Kingdom) Riley (Coventry) Ltd | (United Kingdom) Freddie Dixon (United Kingdom) Cyril Paul | Riley Nine MPH | Riley 1458cc S6 | **D** | 164 [B] | 130 | fire (18 hr) |
| DNF | 1.0 | 44 | (France) A. Gordini (private entrant) | (France) Amédée Gordini (Italy) Carlo Nazarro | SIMCA-Fiat 508 Balilla Sport; Coppa D'Oro | Fiat 996cc S4 | **D** | 145 | 129 | fuel system (morning) |
| DNF | 5.0 | 6 | (Brazil) / (France) B. de Souza Dantas (private entrant) | (Brazil) / (France) Bernard de Souza Dantas (France) Roger Teillac | Bugatti Type 57 | Bugatti 3.3L S8 | ? | 188 | 129 | gearbox (19 hr) |
| DNF | 5.0 ** | 10 | (United Kingdom) Earl Howe (private entrant) | (United Kingdom) Francis Curzon, Earl Howe (United Kingdom) Brian Lewis, Baron Essendon | Alfa Romeo 8C-2300 LM | Alfa Romeo 2.3L S8 supercharged | **D** | 188 | 129 | engine (14 hr) |
| DNF | 5.0 ** | 18 | (France) Viscomte P. Merlin (private entrant) | (France) Viscomte Pierre Merlin (France) Comte Georges d'Arnoux | Bugatti Type 55 | Bugatti 2.3L S8 supercharged | ? | 187 | 128 | electrics (morning) |
| DNF | 5.0 ** | 11 | (Italy) L. Chinetti (private entrant) | (Italy) Luigi Chinetti (Monaco) Jacques Gastaud | Alfa Romeo 8C-2300 LM | Alfa Romeo 2.3L S8 supercharged | ? | 188 [B] | 116 | suspension (13 hr) |
| DNF | 8.0 ** | 2 | (France) R. Labric (private entrant) | (France) Roger Labric (France) Pierre Veyron | Bugatti Type 50 Sports | Bugatti 5.0L S8 supercharged | **D** | 196 | 116 | suspension (13 hr) |
| DNF | 1.0 | 50 | (United Kingdom) Singer Motors Ltd | (United Kingdom) Norman Black (United Kingdom) Roddy Baker | Singer Nine Le Mans Replica | Singer 973cc S4 | **D** | 144 [B] | 107 | electrics (17 hr) |
| DSQ | 750 | 59 | (United Kingdom) Austin Motor Company | (United Kingdom) Pat Driscoll (United Kingdom) Don Parish | Austin 7 EK75 Speedy | Austin 749cc S4 | **D** | 130 | 106 | premature refilling (18 hr) |
| DNF | 2.0 ** | 39 | (United Kingdom) M. Baumer (private entrant) | (United Kingdom) Maurice Baumer (United Kingdom) John Ludovic Ford | MG K3 Magnette | MG 1087cc S4 supercharged | **D** | 158 | 99 | engine (13 hr) |
| DNF | 1.0 ** | 58 | (France) P. Maillard-Brune (private entrant) | (France) Jean Viale (France) Albert Debille | MG J4 Midget | MG 739cc S4 supercharged | **D** | 146 | 98 | engine (~morning) |
| DNF | 3.0 ** | 22 | (United Kingdom) "Tim Davies" (private entrant) | (United Kingdom) "Tim Davies" (Dudley Folland) (United Kingdom) Alfred Pane | Frazer Nash Shelsley | Gough 1496cc S4 supercharged | **D** | 177 | 96 | radiator (17 hr) |
| DNF | 2.0 ** | 41 | (Netherlands) E. Hertzberger (private entrant) | (Netherlands) Eddie Hertzberger (France) "Raph" (Comte George Raphaël; Béthenod de Montbressieux) | MG K3 Magnette | MG 1087cc S4 supercharged | **D** | 158 | 92 | engine (~10 hr) |
| DNF | 1.1 | 43 | (France) Équipe de l’Ours (France) G. Boursin (private entrant) | (France) Marcel Horvilleur (France) Gaston Serff | Amilcar CO/4; Spéciale Martin | Amilcar 1079cc S4 | **D** | 149 | 91 | engine (~dawn) |
| DNF | 750 | 61 | (United Kingdom) Austin Motor Company | (United Kingdom) Charles Goodacre (United Kingdom) R.F. Turner | Austin 7 EK75 Speedy | Austin 749cc S4 | **D** | 130 | 89 | gearbox (15 hr) |
| DNF | 2.0 | 19 | (United Kingdom) / (France) Automobiles Derby | (United Kingdom) Gwenda Stewart (United Kingdom) Charles Worth | Derby L8 | Derby 1991cc V8 | ? | 174 | 87 | engine (~10 hr) |
| DNF | 1.5 | 23 | (United Kingdom) M.T. Collier (private entrant) | (United Kingdom) Michael Collier (United Kingdom) Peter Mitchell-Thomson, Lord Selsdon | Frazer Nash TT Replica | Gough 1496cc S4 | **D** | 165 | 77 | engine (night) |
| DNF | 3.0 ** | 20 | (France) Écurie Argo | (France) Paul Vallée (France) Albert Blondeau | Bugatti Type 35 Spéciale | Bugatti 1989cc S8 supercharged | **D** | 185 | 74 | engine (~13 hr) |
| DNF | 5.0 ** | 15 | (France) R. Sommer (private entrant) | (France) Raymond Sommer (France) Raymond d’Estrez Saugé | Alfa Romeo 8C-2300 MM-LM | Alfa Romeo 2.3L S8 supercharged | **D** | 188 | 69 | co-driver sick (10 hr) |
| DNF | 3.0 | 9 | (France) "M. Rekip" (private entrant) | (France) "M. Rekip" (René Kippeurt) (France) Edmont Nebout | Bugatti Type 44 | Bugatti 3.0L S8 | **D** | 186 | 64 | engine (night) |
| DNF | 1.0 | 49 | (United Kingdom) Singer Motors Ltd | (United Kingdom) Tommy Wisdom (United Kingdom) Donald Barnes | Singer Nine Le Mans Replica | Singer 973cc S4 | **D** | 144 [B] | 57 | electrics (night) |
| DNF | 5.0 | 5 | (France) D. Porthault (private entrant) | (France) Daniel Porthault (France) Just-Émile Vernet | Lorraine-Dietrich B3-6 Le Mans | Lorraine-Dietrich 3.5L S6 | **D** | 189 | 52 | engine (night) |
| DSQ | 1.5 | 37 | (United Kingdom) Riley (Coventry) Ltd | (United Kingdom) Sammy Newsome (United Kingdom) Edgar Maclure | Riley Nine MPH Six Racing | Riley 1458cc S6 | **D** | 164 [B] | 47 | outside assistance (~6 hr) |
| DNF | 1.5 | 28 | (United Kingdom) R.E. Tongue (private entrant) (United Kingdom) Aston Martin Ltd | (United Kingdom) Clifton Penn-Hughes (United Kingdom) Thomas Fothringham-Parker | Aston Martin Ulster | Aston Martin 1496cc S4 | **D** | 165 [B] | 45 | accident (6 hr) |
| DNF | 1.5 | 25 | (United Kingdom) Riley (Coventry) Ltd (United Kingdom) D. Champney (private entrant) | (United Kingdom) Elsie Wisdom (Canada) Kay Petre | Riley Racing MPH 12/4 | Riley 1496cc S4 | **D** | 165 [B] | 38 | engine (~5 hr) |
| DNF | 8.0+ ** | 1 | (Romania) N. von Hohenzollern- Sigmaringen (private entrant) | Prince Nicholas of Romania (France) Émile Beghin | Duesenberg Model SJ | Duesenberg 7.0L S8 supercharged | **D** | 197 | 38 | electrics (evening) |
| DNF | 5.0 ** | 16 | (France) Écurie Argo | (France) Bernard Chaudé (France) Max Fourny | Bugatti Type 51 | Bugatti 2.3L S8 supercharged | ? | 188 | 26 | electrics (evening) |
| DNF | 1.0 | 47 | (United Kingdom) I. Connell (United Kingdom) R. Percival (private entrant) | (United Kingdom) Ian Connell (United Kingdom) Nevil Lloyd | Singer Nine Le Mans | Singer 989cc S4 | **D** | 144 | 17 | clutch (early) |
Sources:

- Note *: [B]= car also entered in the 1935-36 Biennial Cup.
- Note **: equivalent class for supercharging, with x1.4 modifier to engine capacity.

=== Did not start ===
| Pos | Class | No | Team | Drivers | Chassis | Engine | Reason |
|---|---|---|---|---|---|---|---|
| DNS | 8.0 ** | 3 | (France) Treizefonts (private entrant) | (France) Charles Richer-Delavau (France) Jacques de Valence de Minardière | Bugatti Type 50 Sports | Bugatti 5.0L S8 supercharged | Accident in practice |
| DNA | 2.0 ** | 40 | (United Kingdom) Capt. G.E.T. Eyston | | MG K3 Magnette | MG 1087cc S4 supercharged | Did not arrive |
| DNA | 8.0 | | (Spain) J.M. Pons (private entrant) | (Spain) José Maria Pons | Hispano-Suiza | Hispano-Suiza 7.9L S6 | Did not arrive |

=== 1935 Index of performance ===
| Pos | 1934–35 Biennial Cup | Class | No. | Team | Drivers | Chassis | Index Result |
|---|---|---|---|---|---|---|---|
| 1 | 1st | 1.5 | 29 | (United Kingdom) R. Eccles (United Kingdom) Aston Martin Ltd | (United Kingdom) Charlie Martin (United Kingdom) Charles Brackenbury | Aston Martin Ulster | 1.307 |
| 2 | - | 2.0 ** | 42 | (France) P. Maillard-Brune (private entrant) | (France) Philippe Maillard-Brune (France) Charles Druck | MG K3 Magnette | 1.294 |
| 3 | 2nd | 1.0 | 51 | (United Kingdom) F.S. Barnes (United Kingdom) Singer Motors Ltd | (United Kingdom) F. Stanley Barnes (United Kingdom) Alf Langley | Singer Nine Le Mans Replica | 1.284 |
| 4 | 3rd | 1.5 | 24 | (United Kingdom) Riley (Coventry) Ltd | (United Kingdom) Alex “Bill” van der Becke (United Kingdom) Colin Richardson | Riley Racing MPH 12/4 | 1.265 |
| 5 | 4th | 1.5 | 38 | (France) J. Trévoux (private entrant) | (France) Jean Trévoux (France) René Carrière | Riley Racing MPH | 1.247 |
| 6 | - | 1.5 | 33 | (United Kingdom) M. Falkner (private entrant) | (United Kingdom) Maurice Falkner (United Kingdom) Tom Clarke | Aston Martin Ulster | 1.232 |
| 7 | - | 1.5 | 32 | (United Kingdom) C.T. Thomas (private entrant) | (United Kingdom) C.T. “Tommy” Thomas (United Kingdom) Michael Kenyon | Aston Martin Ulster | 1.213 |
| 8 | - | 1.5 | 31 | (United Kingdom) P.L. Donkin (private entrant) | (United Kingdom) Peter Donkin (United Kingdom) Lord Malcolm Douglas-Hamilton | Aston Martin Ulster | 1.209 |
| 9 | - | 1.0 | 48 | (United Kingdom) G. Hendy (private entrant) | (United Kingdom) Gordon Hendy (United Kingdom) James Boulton | Singer Nine Sports | 1.198 |
| 10 | 5th | 1.5 | 27 | (United Kingdom) J. Noël (United Kingdom) Aston Martin Ltd | (United Kingdom) Mortimer Morris-Goodall (United Kingdom) Jim Elwes | Aston Martin Ulster | 1.195 |

- Note: A score of 1.00 means meeting the minimum distance for the car, and a higher score is exceeding the nominal target distance. Only the top-10 finishers are listed

=== Class winners ===
| Class | Winning car | Winning drivers |
|---|---|---|
| over 4-litre (new class) | #4 Lagonda M45 Rapide | Hindmarsh / Fontés |
| 3 to 4-litre (new class) | #12 Alfa Romeo 8C-2300 LM | Louis-Dreyfus / Stoffel * |
| 2 to 3-litre | #21 Alfa Romeo 6C-1750 SS | Desvignes / Weisweiller |
| 1500 to 2000cc | #42 MG K3 Magnette | Maillard-Brune / Druck * |
| 1000 to 1500cc | #29 Aston Martin Ulster | Brackenbury / Martin * |
| Up to 1000cc | #51 Singer Nine Le Mans Replica | Barnes / Langley * |
Note *: setting a new class distance record.

=== Statistics ===
- Fastest Lap – F. Howe, #10 Alfa Romeo 8C-2300 LM – 5:47.9secs; 139.61 km/h (86.75 mph)
- Winning Distance – 3,006.80 km (1,868.34 mi)
- Winner's Average Speed – 125.28 km/h (77.85 mph)
