= Eddie Hertzberger =

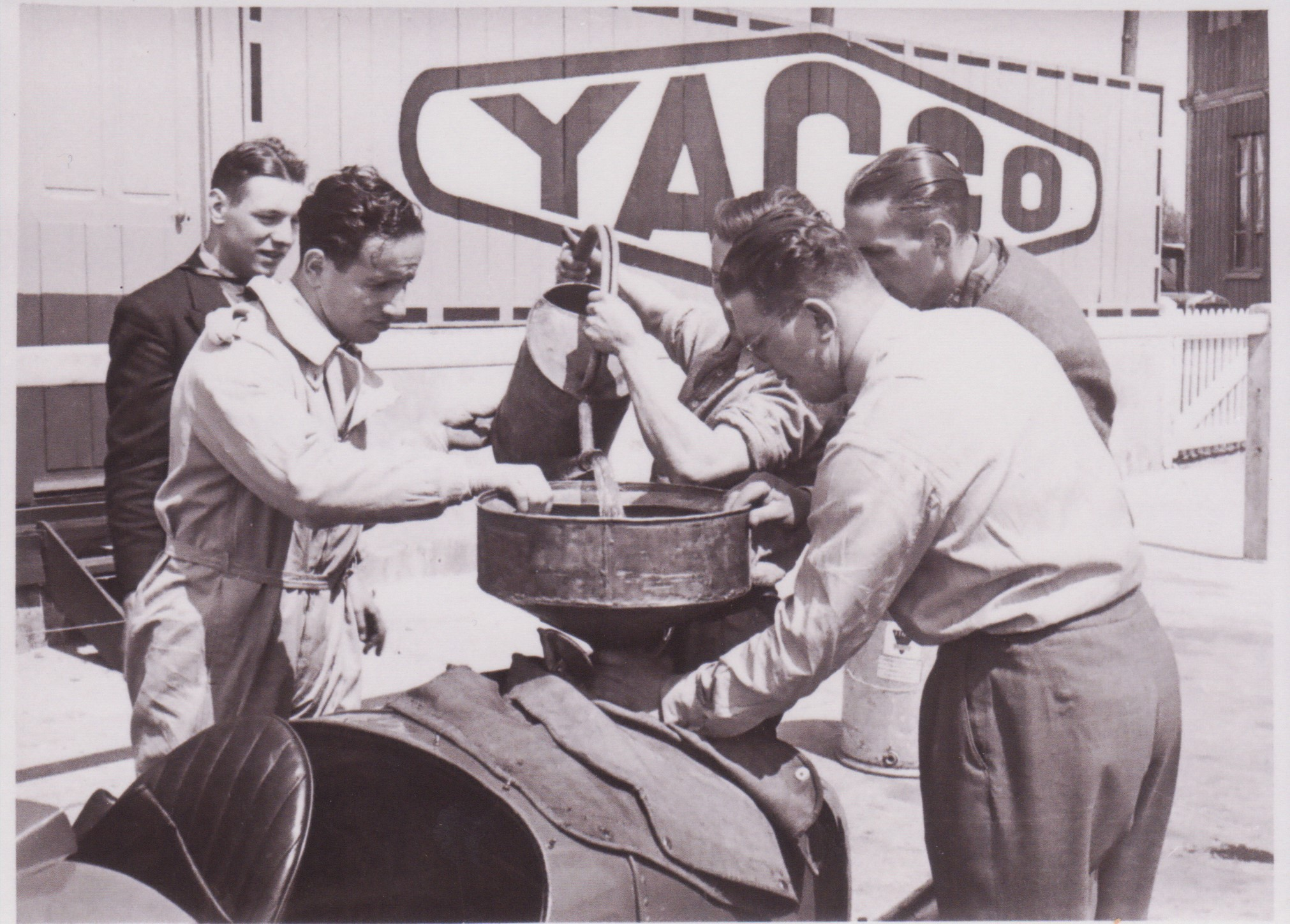
- Eddie in overalls at Montlhéry, refueling his MG K3
- Born: 17 October 1904; Rotterdam, Netherlands
- Died: 2 May 1993 (aged 88); Switzerland
- Occupation: Industrialist
- Spouse: Eleonore Hertzberger-Katz (1917–2016)

Eddie Hertzberger (17 October 1904 – 2 May 1993) was a wealthy Dutch industrialist and racecar driver.

He won the 1936 Grand Prix des Frontières for sports cars at Chimay, Belgium, and the 1937 Voiturette race at the same event. He also competed in the 1935 and 1937 24 Hours of Le Mans races.

In the twenties Hertzberger also did some boxing, while he did a lot of sailing and skiing throughout his life.

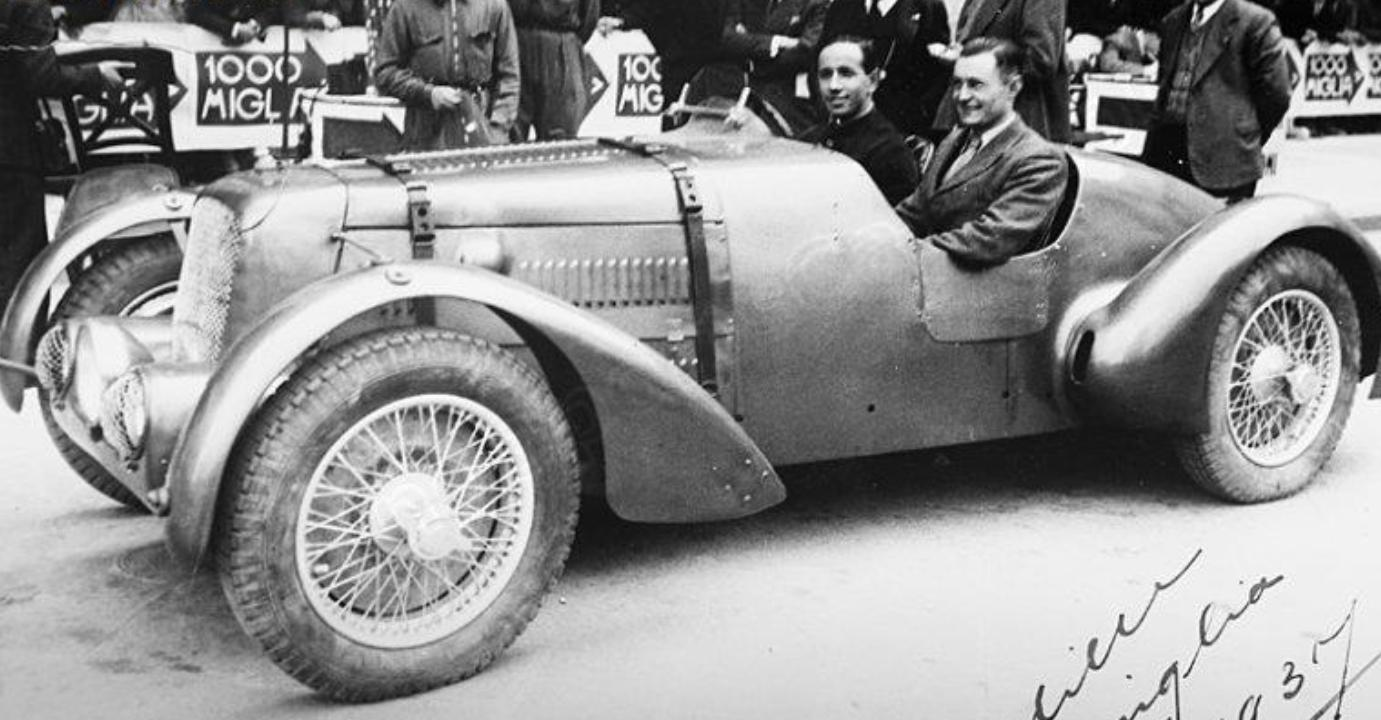
Hertzberger with his 1936 Aston Martin Speed Model Red Dragon s/n H6/711/U at Mille Miglia on 4 April 1937, where his co-driver was Jacques van der Pijl.

Hertzberger owned cars like a Bugatti Type 57 Stelvio 4-seater, with which he participated in the 12-hour night drive organised by the KNAC (Royal Dutch Automobile Club) in September 1926, the MG Magnette K3, a 4.5 litre Bentley and an Aston Martin. He restricted his racing to England, France, Italy and Belgium, with motor racing in the Netherlands virtually non-existent, and Jews not allowed to participate in motor racing in Nazi Germany.

At Montlhéry, Hertzberger managed to break some speed records in his MG K3. He also started in the Mille Miglia and at Le Mans.

He quit racing in 1938 after getting married, although he made a surprise appearance at Zandvoort in 1953 with an Aston Martin DB2.

Hertzberger was the first of only two Dutch racing drivers to win races titled 'Grand Prix', the other being Carel Godin de Beaufort, until Max Verstappen won the 2016 Spanish Grand Prix.

== Personal life ==
Hertzberger owned a successful clothing factory in Rotterdam. The factory, including his Bugatti Stelvio #57519 which was parked inside, was completely destroyed at the outbreak of World War II during the bombardment of Rotterdam that prompted the surrender of Holland to the Nazis. Hertzberger escaped the Netherlands through Belgium and France to Switzerland, where he stayed for more than a year. Later he travelled through Vichy France to reach Spain. In Madrid Hertzberger became a member of the intelligence service of the Dutch government, which was based in London during World War II.

After the war, Hertzberger rebuilt his factory and lived both in the Netherlands and New York City. Later he moved to Switzerland, where he died in 1993.

His wife, Eleonore Hertzberger-Katz, wrote a book about their hazardous journeys.

Eddie Hertzberger's granddaughter Gwendolyn Hertzberger competed in Formula Renault in the 2000s.
