= Barbara Skinner =

Barbara Katherine Bolster (née Skinner; 6 April 1911 – 3 January 1942) was a British racing driver of the 1930s. She began racing when her father presented her with a Morris Cowley Special development car and raced at the Shelsley Walsh Speed Hill Climb. Skinner took part in the 1935 24 Hours of Le Mans as part of a three-car, six-women team dubbed "George Eyston's Dancing Daughters". She was the holder of the ladies' record at the Shelsley Walsh Speed Hill Climb and secured a class victory at the Lewes Speed Trials. Skinner was killed in a traffic accident in Kent in 1942.

== Biography ==
Skinner was born in Barnet, Middlesex on 6 April 1911. She was the daughter of the boot and shoe manufacturer and motor car enthusiast Thomas Carlyle Skinner. Skinner had a younger brother. At the time of her birth, the British Auto Racing Club (BARC) barred women from competing against men until it lifted the restriction in 1932. Skinner received a Morris Cowley Special development car owned by her father for her 21st birthday in 1932. Later in the year, she made her motor racing debut competing in the Morris Cowley Special at the Shelsley Walsh Speed Hill Climb on 3 September, winning the MAC Ladies Cup prize awarded for the fastest ascent by a female driver in a sports car of the day – achieved with a time of 56.6 seconds.

The Morris Cowley Special was retired from motor racing at the end of 1932 due to it no longer being competitive but Skinner kept it in her possession to tow her new White Minor racer presented to her by William Morris, 1st Viscount Nuffield, founder of Morris Motors, to events. She also used it in two RAC Rallies, but after completing the 1,000 mi (1,600 km) road sections without penalty, she had trouble in the final tests. This her to focus on sprint events, and she persuaded her father to install her brother supercharged Morris Minor engine in another Morris Minor chassis. A faulty bearing metal caused an front-end engine failure before the first meeting at Shelsley Walsh in 1934 but it was stripped, rebaringed and reassembled at Glacier Metal Co. At the international open hill climb meeting, she set a time of 50.35 seconds, four seconds slower than the ladies' record. Skinner set another time of 50.8 seconds at another Shelsley Walsh meet that was the fastest time of all women of the day, for which she received a special cup award. She later set a new ladies' record at of 46.6 seconds, beating the previous record of a Miss Sedgwick by 1.4 seconds.

In May 1935, Skinner took part in an all-female motor race at Donington Park, failing to start because of engine trouble. She was entered into the 1935 24 Hours of Le Mans and was part of a three-car, six-women team dubbed the "George Eyston's Dancing Daughters". Skinner shared the factory-entered No. 55 MG PA Midget with Doreen Evans in the 1.1 category, completing 136 laps to finish 25th overall and tenth in class. The following year, she was one of two women to enter the Frazer Nash Car Club meet at Donington Park, and continued competing at Shelsley Walsh Hill Climb and winning titles there until 1938. Skinner also raced competitively at Brooklands, becoming part of the "Brooklands Belles". She also secured a class victory at the Lewes Speed Trials and set the fastst lap time at the Dancer's End Hill Climb in 1936.

== Personal life ==
Skinner married the motoring driver John V. Bolster at All Souls Church, Langham Place on 8 October 1936. She was killed in a traffic accident on public roads at Meopham, Kent on 3 January 1942.

== Legacy ==
A geltalin silver print featuring Skinner that was taken by an unknown photographer in June 1935 is held in the collection of the National Portrait Gallery, London.

== 24 Hours of Le Mans results ==
Year	Team	Co-Driver	Car	Class	Laps	Pos.	Class Pos.
1935	(United Kingdom) Capt. G.E.T. Eyston (United Kingdom) MG Cars	(United Kingdom) Doreen Evans	MG PA Midget	1.1	136	25th	10th
