= Luis Fontés =

English racing driver

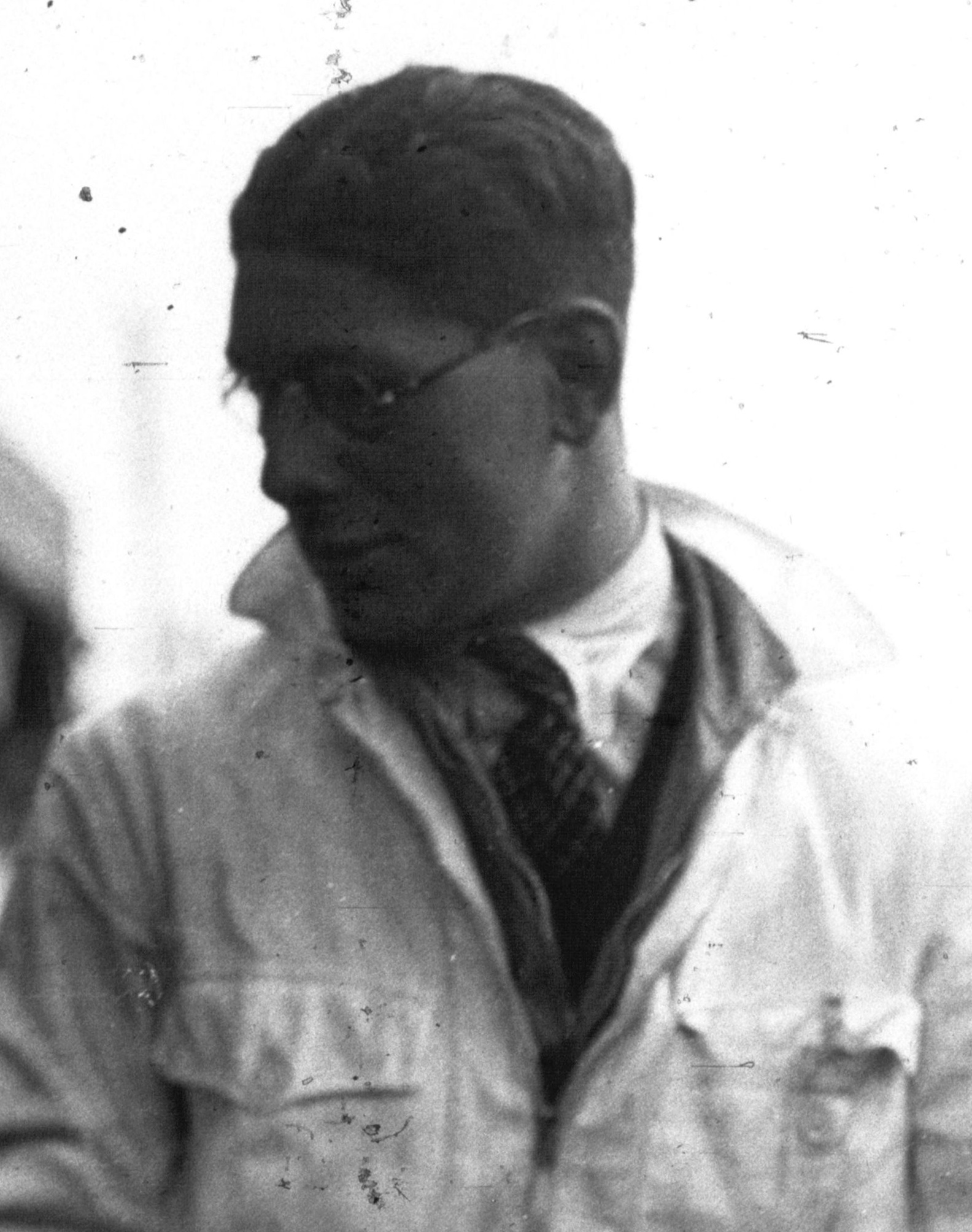
- Luis Fontés at the 1935 24 Hours of Le Mans
- Nationality: (United Kingdom) British
- Born: Luis Goncelvis Fontés; 26 December 1912; London, England
- Died: 12 October 1940 (aged 27); Llandow, Wales

24 Hours of Le Mans career
- Years: 1935
- Teams: Arthur W. Fox
- Best finish: 1st (1935)
- Class wins: 1 (1935)

Luis Goncelvis Fontés (26 December 1912 – 12 October 1940) was a British racing driver of Brazilian parentage who, along with John Stuart Hindmarsh, won the 1935 24 Hours of Le Mans for the Lagonda automobile company and won the inaugural Limerick Grand Prix in 1935 in an Alfa Romeo. He also held a pilot's licence after learning to fly at Reading Aerodrome, Berkshire, UK, and entered his own Miles Hawk Speed Six racing aeroplane (registered G-ADGP) in the prestigious King's Cup Air Race in 1935.

On 6 October 1935, Fontés was taking part in an illegal road race on public roads while drunk, when he was involved in a head-on collision with a motorcyclist, Reg Mordike. Mordike died the next day and as a result Fontés was charged with manslaughter, and after being convicted, was sentenced to three years in prison. He was released from prison in February 1938 and soon resumed air racing, taking part in the 1938 King's Cup, finishing 13th, while also taking up powerboat racing. Fontés later briefly served as an Air Transport Auxiliary ferry pilot during World War II but was killed on 12 October 1940 while delivering a Vickers Wellington Mk1C bomber to an RAF Aircraft Storage Unit at RAF Llandow in South Wales. The Le Mans Lagonda M45R ('BPK 202') survives in the Dutch National Automobile Museum (Louwman Museum) at The Hague and the aeroplane was owned and raced for many years postwar by the late Ron Paine but is now owned by The Shuttleworth Collection, UK.

== Racing record ==
=== Complete 24 Hours of Le Mans results ===
Year	Team	Co-Drivers	Car	Class	Laps	Pos.	Class Pos.
1935	(United Kingdom) Arthur W. Fox & Charles Nicholl	(United Kingdom) Johnny Hindmarsh	Lagonda M45R Rapide	5.0	222	1st	1st

Sporting positions
Preceded by Luigi Chinetti; Philippe Étancelin	Winner of the 24 Hours of Le Mans; 1935 with: Johnny Hindmarsh	Succeeded by Jean-Pierre Wimille; Robert Benoist
