= Johnny Hindmarsh =

English racecar driver and aviator (1907–1938)

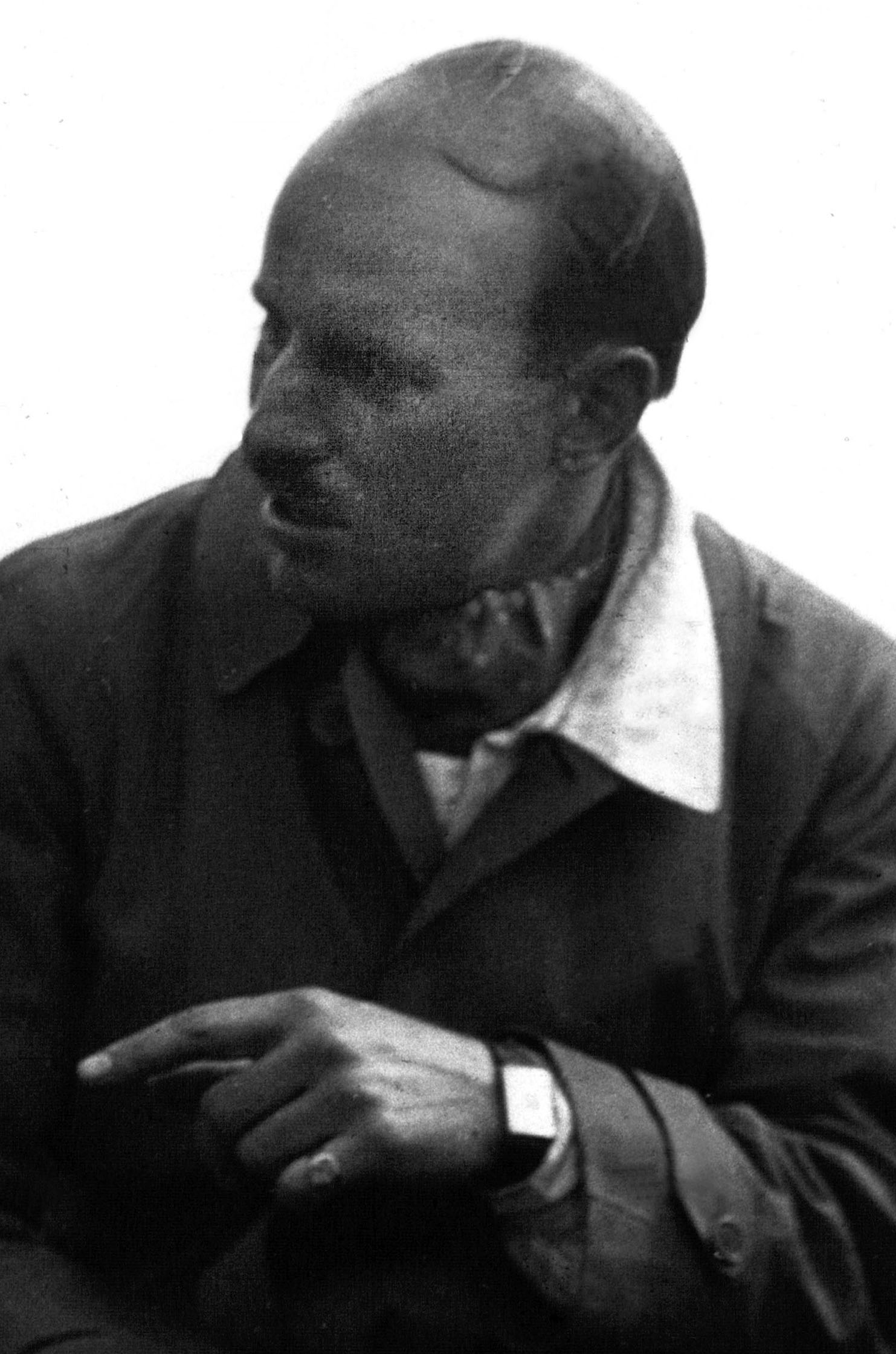
- Johnny Hindmarsh at the 1935 24 Hours of Le Mans.
- Nationality: (United Kingdom) British
- Born: John Stuart Hindmarsh; 25 November 1907
- Died: 6 September 1938 (aged 30) Near Brooklands, Surrey, England

24 Hours of Le Mans career
- Years: 1930 – 1931, 1934 – 1935, 1937
- Teams: Fox & Nicholl; A.A. Rigby
- Best finish: 1st (1935)
- Class wins: 1 (1935)

John Stuart Hindmarsh (25 November 1907 – 6 September 1938) was an English racing driver and aviator.

== Career ==
Hindmarsh was educated at Sherborne, Dorset and then attended the Royal Military College. He joined the Royal Army Tank Corps in 1928, then in 1930 learned to fly with the Royal Air Force.

Hindmarsh also raced Talbot and Lagonda cars; he won the Le Mans 24-Hour Race in 1935 in a 4½ litre Lagonda M45R Rapide with Luis Fontés (222 laps; 3006.797 km; average speed 125.283 km/h).

Hindmarsh was killed aged 30 while test flying Hawker Hurricane I L1652 at Brooklands on 6 September 1938; he is thought to have been overcome by carbon monoxide fumes in the cockpit, and the aeroplane then dived almost vertically into the ground and exploded at the foot of St George's Hill almost opposite the Vickers factory entrance.

== Family life ==
Hindmarsh married the multiple record breaking racing driver Violette Cordery on 15 September 1931 at Stoke D'Abernon parish church, and they had two daughters, one of whom married the racing driver Roy Salvadori. Widowed in 1938, Cordery retired from public life until her death on 30 December 1983 in Oxshott, Surrey.

== Racing record ==
=== Complete 24 Hours of Le Mans results ===
Year	Team	Co-Drivers	Car	Class	Laps	Pos.	Class Pos.
1930	(United Kingdom) Fox & Nicholl	(United Kingdom) Tim Rose-Richards	Talbot 90	3.0	160	4th	2nd
1931	(United Kingdom) Fox & Nicholl	(United Kingdom) Brian Lewis, Baron Essendon	Talbot AV105	3.0	132	DNF (Chassis)	
1934	(United Kingdom) A.A. Rigby	(United Kingdom) Brian Lewis, Baron Essendon	Singer Le Mans 1½ Litre	1.5	195	7th	3rd
1935	(United Kingdom) Arthur W. Fox & Charles Nicholl	(United Kingdom) Luis Fontés	Lagonda M45R Rapide	5.0	222	1st	1st
1937	(United Kingdom) Arthur W. Fox	(United Kingdom) Charles Brackenbury	Lagonda LG45	5.0	30	DNF	

Sporting positions
Preceded by Luigi Chinetti; Philippe Étancelin	Winner of the 24 Hours of Le Mans; 1935 with: Luis Fontés	Succeeded by Jean-Pierre Wimille; Robert Benoist
