= Joan Richmond =

Australian motor racing driver

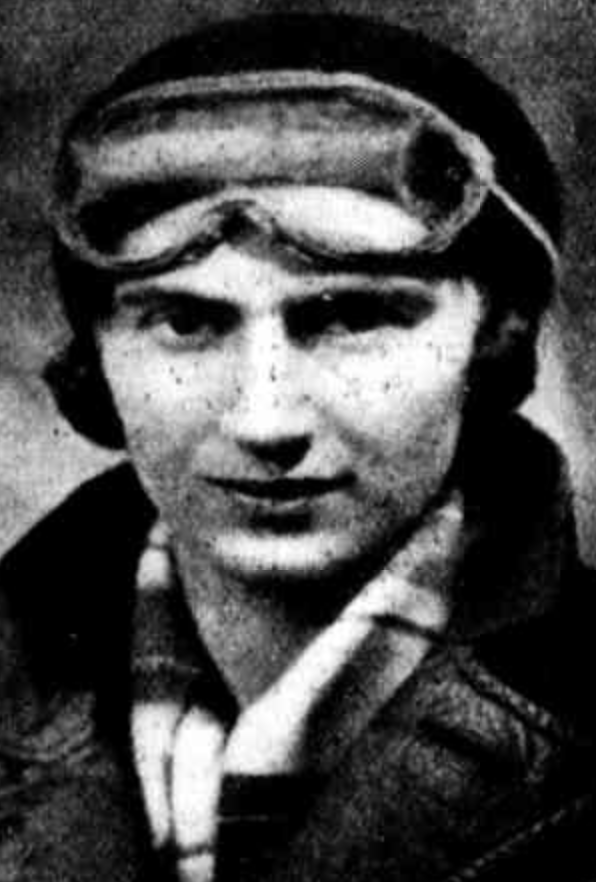
Richmond, c. 1930

Joan Richmond (1905–1999) was an Australian pioneer in motorsport who competed internationally in seven Monte Carlo rallies and two Le Mans 24 Hours races.

== Early life and education ==
Joan Richmond was born in Cooma in 1905 and grew up in Victoria. She was educated at St Catherine’s, Toorak, leaving at the end of 1923.

== Racing career ==
As a young woman she trained and rode her own racehorses. In 1932, however, Victoria banned women from being horse trainers, which caused her to take up motor racing instead. She had competed in car trials from 1926 onwards. In the 1931 Australian Grand Prix, held at Phillip Island, she finished fifth in a Riley Brooklands in the male-dominated field. After this success, she and two friends (Jean Beatson and Kathleen Gardiner) set out to drive three Riley Nine motorcars overland from Melbourne to Italy in order to compete in the Monte Carlo Rally. The trip took five months and is considered to be the very first international overland tour to have begun in Australia.

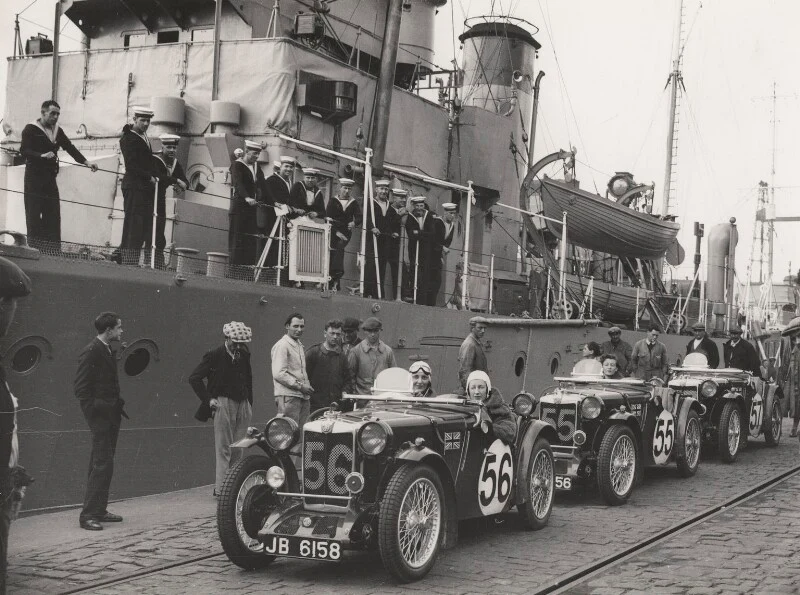
Richmond with co-driver Eva Gordon-Simpson in the first of three MGs bound for Le Mans in June 1935

Travelling to England she accepted the opportunity to compete with Elsie Wisdom in the two-day 1,000 mile race at Brooklands. They won in a Riley Nine, at 84.41 mph, taking 12 hours 23 minutes and 53 seconds to complete the distance.

In 1933 she bought a 1921 Ballot that had previously been raced by Malcolm Campbell, but its age and poor reliability gave her little success.

In the 1930s she was co-driver with Bill Bilney, to whom she became engaged in 1937. He was killed during a motor race at Donington Park in July 1937. She gave up motor racing following the outbreak of World War II and remained in England, where she worked in a de Havilland aircraft factory.

== Later life ==
Richmond returned to Australia in 1946 and became an advocate for animal welfare.

In 1989 she wrote the introduction to David G. Styles' The Sporting Rileys: The Forgotten Champions. The book included details of her overland journey in the 1930s.

She died in 1999.

== Legacy ==
Richmond gave her collection of trophies, cups, photographs, letters and diaries to David Price, a friend who hoped to produce a biography. Included were number-plates from the Monte Carlo rally. When Price was unable to attract a publisher, he sold the collection at auction in Melbourne in 2007. His book, Joan Richmond: The Remarkable, Previously Untold Story from Melbourne to Monte Carlo and Beyond, compiled from his research and taped interviews with his subject, was finally published in 2011.

The National Museum of Australia held an exhibition on Richmond in 2014 and holds the 1932 Brooklands 1000 Miles Race trophy awarded to Joan Richmond and Elsie Wisdom in its collections as well as a one-piece racing suit, a pair of driving goggles, her Monte Carlo Rally car number plates, personal journal, letters, photographs and newspaper clippings.
