= Eva Gordon-Simpson =

British racing driver

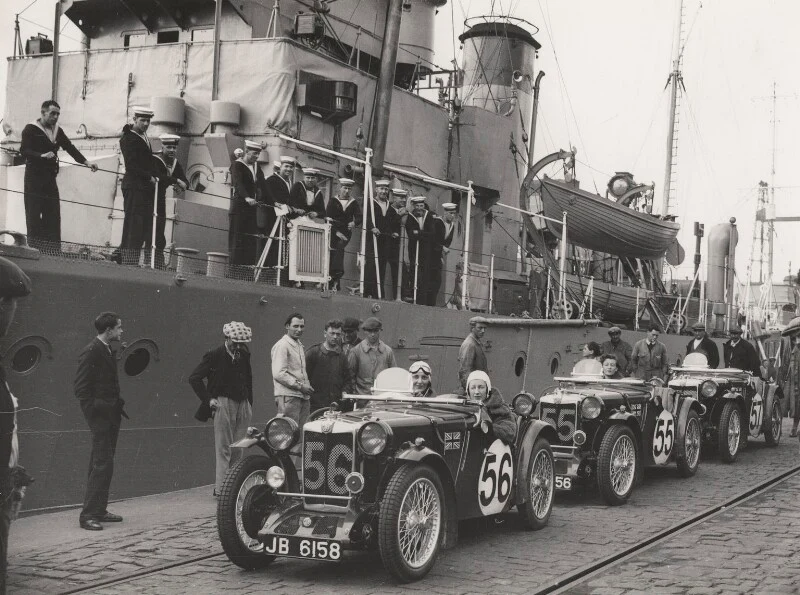
Eva Gordon-Simpson and Joan Richmond in the first of three MGs in June 1935

Evelin Gordon-Simpson (née Brewer; 1901–1980) was a British racing driver. She was born on 30th July, 1901 in Garstang, Lancashire, and died on 23rd June, 1980 in Paddington, London.

In 1932, Gordon-Simpson drove in the Monte Carlo Rally in a Singer, finishing 24th overall and 2nd to Alexandra Lindh among the women entrants.

She competed in the 1935 24 Hours of Le Mans endurance race as part of a team of women known as "Eyston's Dancing Daughters". The six women drove three MG P-types. Striving for reliability rather than position, all three cars successfully completed the race and were the focus of much attention. Gordon-Simpson and her co-driver of car #56, Australian Joan Richmond, finished 24th overall and first among the three MGs.

In 1937, Gordon-Simpson married engineer and Bugatti enthusiast Hugh Graham (H.G.) Conway, who would go on to help design the Concorde.
