= Margaret Allan (racing driver) =

Scottish motor racing driver (1909–1998)

Margaret Jennings
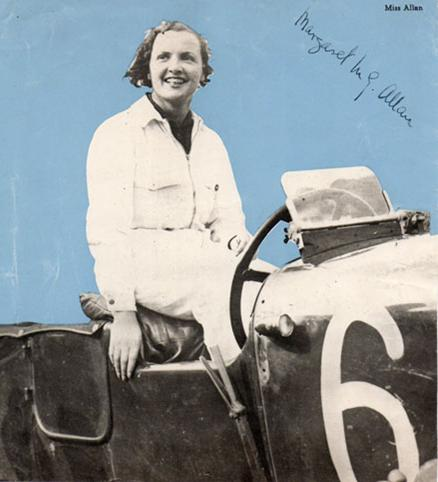
- Born: Margaret Mabel Gladys Allan; 26 July 1909; Troon, Ayrshire, Scotland
- Died: 21 September 1998 (aged 89); Carmarthenshire, Wales
- Education: Bedales School
- Occupations: Racing driver and journalist
- Spouse: Christopher Jennings
- Children: 1
- Relatives: Alexander Allan (great grandfather); Janie Allan (aunt)

Margaret Mabel Gladys Jennings (née Allan; 26 July 1909 – 21 September 1998) was a Scottish motor racing driver. As Margaret Allan (sometimes erroneously "Allen") she was one of the leading British female racing and rally drivers in the inter-war years, and one of only four women ever to earn a 120 mph badge at the Brooklands circuit. During the war, Jennings worked as an ambulance driver and then at Bletchley Park's intelligence de-coding centre. After the war, she became a journalist and was Vogue magazine's motoring correspondent from 1948 to 1957.

== Early life ==
Margaret Allan was born in Troon, Ayrshire, in July 1909. She was the daughter of James Allan, a member of the wealthy Scottish-Canadian family who owned the Allan Line steamship company. The Allan family were progressive and politically active. James' sister was well known suffragette Janie Allan, and Margaret was educated at the liberal and unorthodox Bedales School. A keen horsewoman from an early age, Allan's mother nurtured her independent streak and encouraged her to learn to drive as soon as she was old enough.

== Career ==
=== Racing driver ===
Allan's earliest entries into competitive motor sport were with her family's Lagonda, driving in trials events organized by the Women's Automobile and Sports Association (WASA). In December 1930, she successfully completed the London-Gloucester Trial in the Lagonda, earning the Ladies' Prize, her driving described as "neat and fast" by Motor Sport magazine. She continued to enter trials and rally events over the following few years, often taking class and ladies' wins. Allan's first international-level rally was the 1932 Monte Carlo Rally, that she entered in a works Riley Nine with co-driver Eve Staniland. The pair finished in 10th position overall, and second in the Coupe des Dames. Later that year, Allan, with her brother Hamish acting as co-driver, entered the Alpine Trial; the week-long event was then considered the most demanding in Europe. In their Wolseley Hornet, the siblings were awarded a Glacier Cup prize for completing the trial without penalty, and Allan's drive earned her joint victory in the Coupe des Dames, alongside her Wolseley team mate, Mrs. Martin.

Also in 1932, Allan had her first taste of circuit racing. Following a visit to the Brooklands circuit, she persuaded her father to buy a faster, supercharged, 2-litre Lagonda. It was with this car that she made her circuit debut at Brooklands, driving as part of the WASA entry in the popular Inter-Club Meeting. Their three-woman team only narrowly missed the overall Stanley Cup title, by one point, being beaten by the Junior Car Club. She returned to Brooklands for the 1933 Inter-Club Meeting, but had upgraded her mount to a 4½-litre Bentley. Although the WASA team only finished in third position, Allan herself took her first outright circuit race victory, as she finished first in the Junior Long Handicap event. Allan's fastest lap was timed at 97.65 mph. Her second Brooklands outright win also came at the wheel of the 4½-litre Bentley in the Junior Long Handicap, at the Easter Meeting the following year.

Allan's performances attracted the attention of the works MG Cars team, and she was asked to join their squad for the Light Car Club's 1934 200 mile Relay Race at Brooklands. Their all-female team, driving an MG Magnette, took third position overall in a race that ended amidst a torrential thunderstorm. She maintained close links to MG, and was a lead driver of George Eyston's "Dancing Daughters", a three car, all-female entry in the 1935 24 Hours of Le Mans race, driving works-prepared MG PAs.

1935 was also the year that saw Margaret Allan first drive one of the cars with which she was to become most strongly associated: Richard Marker's Bentley 4½ Litre, "Old Mother Gun". This car had won the 1928 24 Hours of Le Mans race as a factory Bentley entry, but since passing into Marker's ownership had been fitted with a streamlined, single-seater body that had formerly been fitted to a 3-litre car owned by Woolf Barnato, in place of the car's original tourer coachwork. Although her best result in 1935 with Old Mother Gun was only a second place, she was more successful with Dudley Folland's single-seat Frazer Nash Shelsley. With this car she won the handicap race at the August Bank Holiday Meeting, with a race lap best of 119.15 mph. In practice she had lapped at 127.05 mph, faster than Earl Howe's contemporary race record of 127 mph.

As it transpired, 1936 was to be Allan's last full season of competitive motorsport. Marker had refitted Old Mother Gun with a much larger, 6½-litre engine, greatly increasing its performance. With it, Allan took second place at the opening Brooklands meeting that year, but won the Second Whitsun Long Handicap race a few weeks later. In this race her average speed was over 115 mph, but her best racing lap had been timed at 122.37 mph. This achievement earned Allan an official 120 mph badge, one of only four (or five, sources disagree) women to do so over the existence of the Brooklands track as an active motorsport venue. Later in 1936 she drove the Frazer Nash at the Shelsley Walsh hillclimb, where she won the Ladies' Prize.

In 1943, looking back, a contributor to Motor Sport magazine assessed her racing record as "every bit as good ... as any man with comparable motor-cars."

Following her marriage Margaret Jennings did make one brief return to competition, in the Circuit of Ireland rally in 1950. Despite having been absent from competitive motorsport for well over a decade, Jennings won the Ladies' Prize for the event.

=== WWII ===
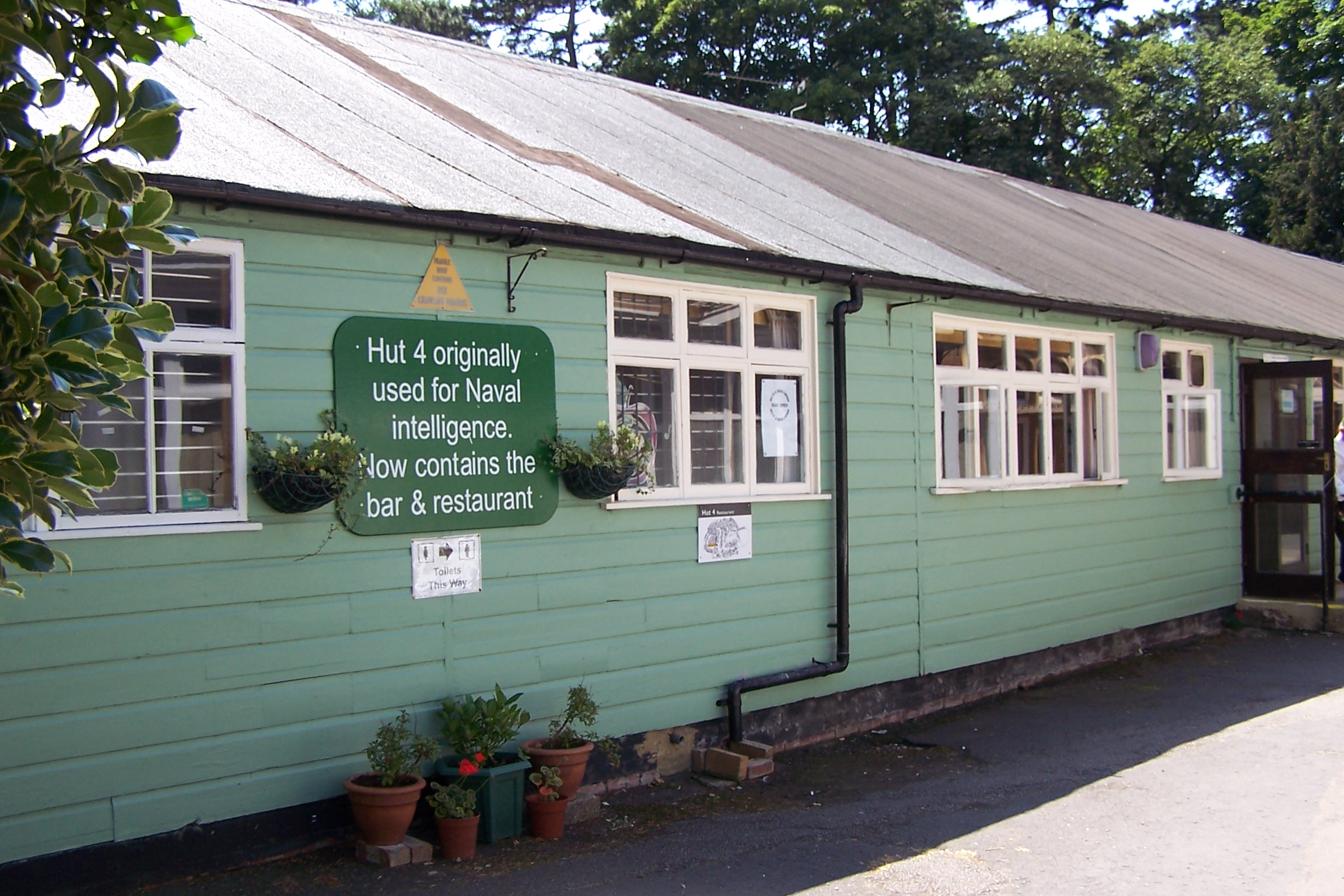
Hut 4, next to the mansion, used during the war for naval intelligence, now refurbished as a bar and restaurant for the museum

During the Second World War she served as an ambulance driver, and was later posted to Bletchley Park. There, she worked in the "intelligence de-coding centre," based in Hut 4.

=== Journalism ===
After the war Jennings became a journalist and was Vogue magazine's motoring correspondent for many years in the 1940s and 1950s, as well as providing road test articles for The Motor, Autocar, and other motoring magazines.

== Personal life ==
In 1937 she married Christopher Jennings, later editor of The Motor, and retired from racing. They had one son. They moved to Gellideg, Llandyfaelog, Carmarthenshire, where Christopher became High sheriff in 1957. Gellideg was the first house in the village to be connected to the Llanelli electricity supply. In addition to her motoring activities she also became a proficient gardener, and won multiple Royal Horticultural Society prizes over the following decades as well as exhibiting at the Chelsea Flower Show.

Margaret Jennings died in Carmarthenshire, aged 89, in September 1998.
