= 1930 Monaco Grand Prix =

Coordinates: 43°44′4.74″N 7°25′16.8″E

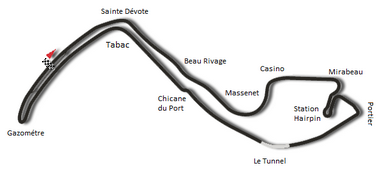

Race details
- Date: 6 April 1930
- Official name: II Grand Prix de Monaco
- Location: Circuit de Monaco; Monte Carlo
- Course: Street circuit
- Course length: 3.180 km (1.976 miles)
- Distance: 100 laps, 318.0 km (197.6 miles)
- Weather: Sunny

Pole position
Driver	(United Kingdom) William Grover-Williams	Bugatti

Fastest lap
Driver	(France) René Dreyfus	Bugatti
- Time: 2:07

Podium
First	(France) René Dreyfus	Bugatti
Second	(Monaco) Louis Chiron	Bugatti
Third	(France) Guy Bouriat	Bugatti

The 1930 Monaco Grand Prix was a Grand Prix motor race held at the Circuit de Monaco on 6 April 1930. Frenchman René Dreyfus won the race in a privateer Bugatti, ahead of the works Bugattis of Louis Chiron and Guy Bouriat. The race was somewhat marred by allegations of race-fixing.

== Entries ==
No	Driver	Entrant	Constructor	Chassis	Engine
2	(Germany) Max Arco-Zinneberg	Private entry	Mercedes-Benz	Mercedes-Benz SSK	7.1 L6
4	(Germany) Rudolf Caracciola	Private entry	Mercedes-Benz	Mercedes-Benz SSK	7.1 L6
6	(Germany) Ernst Günther Burgaller	German Bugatti Team	Bugatti	Bugatti T37A	1.5 L4
8	(Germany) Hans Stuck	Private entry	Austro-Daimler	Austro-Daimler ADM-R	3.6 L6
10	(Austria) Emil Frankl	Private entry	Steyr	?	4.5 L6
12	(France) Georges Bouriano	Private entry	Bugatti	Bugatti T35B	2.3 L8
14	(Chile) Juan Zanelli	Private entry	Bugatti	Bugatti T35B	2.3 L8
16	(France) Guy Bouriat	Automobiles Ettore Bugatti	Bugatti	Bugatti T35C	2.0 L8
18	(Monaco) Louis Chiron	Automobiles Ettore Bugatti	Bugatti	Bugatti T35C	2.0 L8
20	(France) Michel Doré	Private entry	Bugatti	Bugatti T37A	1.5 L4
22	(France) René Dreyfus	Ecurie Friederich	Bugatti	Bugatti T35B	2.3 L8
24	(France) Philippe Étancelin	Private entry	Bugatti	Bugatti T35C	2.0 L8
26	(France) Marcel Lehoux	Private entry	Bugatti	Bugatti T35B	2.3 L8
28	(United Kingdom) William Grover-Williams	Automobiles Ettore Bugatti	Bugatti	Bugatti T35C	2.0 L8
30	(United Kingdom) Bobby Bowes	Private entry	Frazer Nash	?	1.5 L4
32	(Italy) Luigi Arcangeli	Officine Alfieri Maserati	Maserati	Maserati 26B	2.1 L8
34	(Italy) Baconin Borzacchini	Officine Alfieri Maserati	Maserati	Maserati 26B	2.0 L8
36	(Italy) Clemente Biondetti	Scuderia Materassi	Talbot	Talbot 700	1.5 L8
38	(France) Edmond Bourlier	Scuderia Materassi	Talbot	Talbot 700	1.5 L8
40	(Italy) Enzo Ferrari	Scuderia Ferrari	Alfa Romeo	Alfa Romeo P2	2.0 L8
42	(Italy) Goffredo Zehender	Private entry	Bugatti	Bugatti T35B	2.3 L8
44	(Kingdom of Yugoslavia) Veličkovič	Private entry	Bugatti	Bugatti T37A	1.5 L4
46	(Switzerland) Hans Stuber	Private entry	Bugatti	Bugatti T35C	2.0 L8
?	(Italy) Giuseppe Campari	Scuderia Ferrari	Alfa Romeo	Alfa Romeo P2	2.0 L8

== Starting grid ==
Starting grid — 1930 Monaco Grand Prix
(United Kingdom) Grover-Williams; Bugatti		
(United Kingdom) Grover-Williams; Bugatti	(Italy) Borzacchini; Maserati	
	(Italy) Borzacchini; Maserati	(Switzerland) Stuber; Bugatti
(France) Bouriat; Bugatti		
(France) Bouriat; Bugatti	(Monaco) Chiron; Bugatti	
	(Monaco) Chiron; Bugatti	(Chile) Zanelli; Bugatti
(France) Lehoux; Bugatti		
(France) Lehoux; Bugatti	(Italy) Zehender; Bugatti	
	(Italy) Zehender; Bugatti	(France) Doré; Bugatti
(France) Dreyfus; Bugatti		
(France) Dreyfus; Bugatti	(Italy) Arcangeli; Maserati	
	(Italy) Arcangeli; Maserati	(France) Étancelin; Bugatti
(Italy) Biondetti; Talbot		
(Italy) Biondetti; Talbot	(Germany) Stuck; Austro-Daimler	
	(Germany) Stuck; Austro-Daimler	(Germany) Arco-Zinneberg; Mercedes-Benz
(France) Bouriano; Bugatti		
(France) Bouriano; Bugatti	(Germany) Burgaller; Bugatti	

Note: grid slots were determined by drawing lots (Bowes, Ferrari and Frankl had provisionally been due to start on the first, third and fourth row, respectively).

== Classification ==
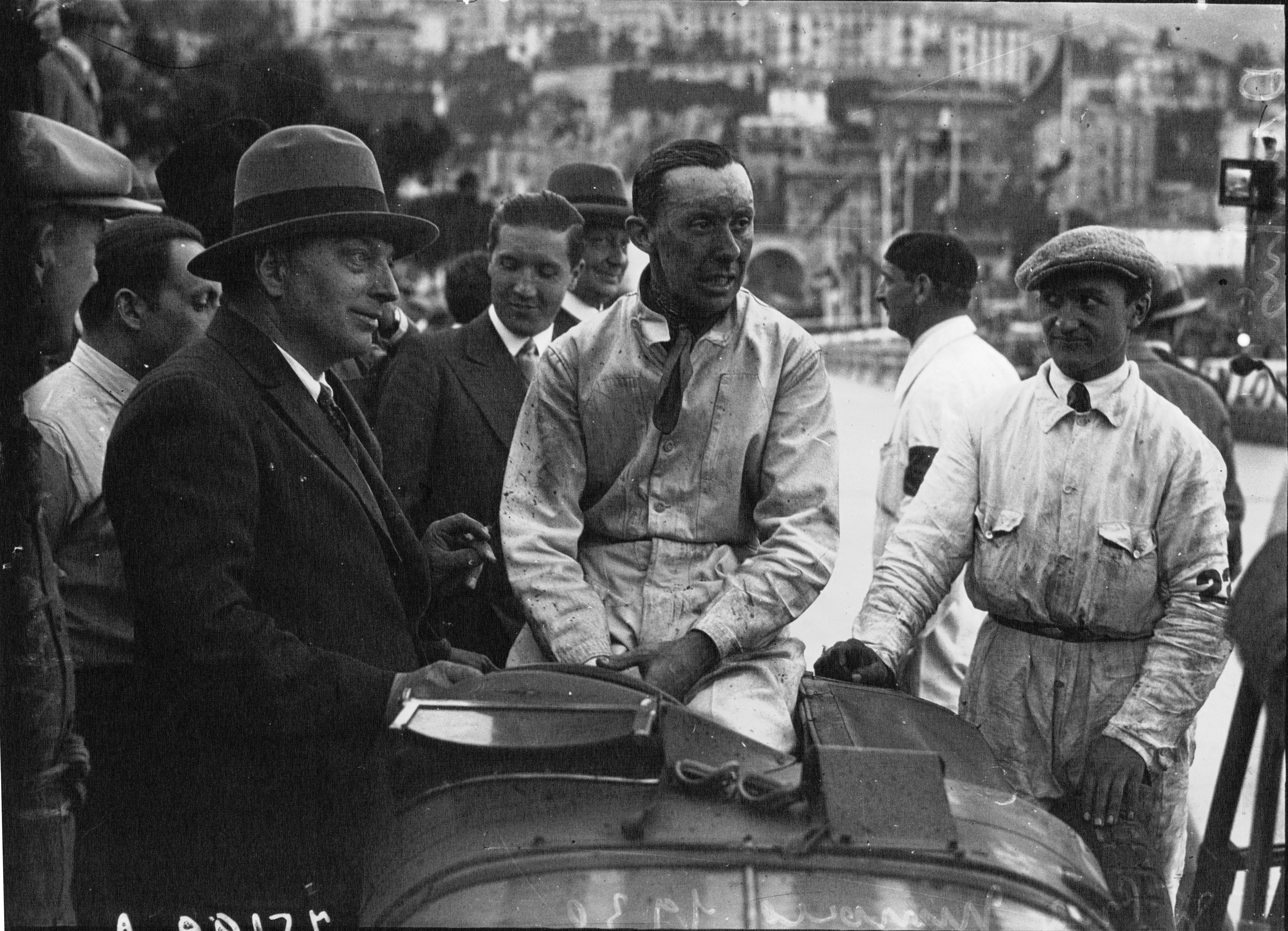
René Dreyfus after winning the race

=== Race ===
Pos	No	Driver	Car	Laps	Time/Retired	Grid
1	22	(France) René Dreyfus	Bugatti T35B	100	3:41:02.6	10
2	18	(Monaco) Louis Chiron	Bugatti T35C	100	+23.8	5
3	16	(France) Guy Bouriat	Bugatti T35C	100	+8:17.8	4
4	42	(Italy) Goffredo Zehender	Bugatti T35B	100	+10:37.0	8
5	20	(France) Michel Doré	Bugatti T37A	100	+31:04.0	9
6	46	(Switzerland) Hans Stuber	Bugatti T35C	94	Flagged off	3
Ret	14	(Chile) Juan Zanelli	Bugatti T35B	92	Mechanical	6
Ret	6	(Germany) Ernst Günther Burgaller	Bugatti T37A	62	Engine	17
Ret	24	(France) Philippe Étancelin	Bugatti T35C	60	Fuel pipe	12
Ret	26	(France) Marcel Lehoux	Bugatti T35B	47	Rear axle	7
Ret	8	(Germany) Hans Stuck	Austro-Daimler ADM-R	31	Clutch, brakes	14
Ret	28	(United Kingdom) William Grover-Williams	Bugatti T35C	29	Mechanical	1
Ret	32	(Italy) Luigi Arcangeli	Maserati 26B	29	Differential	11
Ret	36	(Italy) Clemente Biondetti	Talbot 700	14	Mechanical	13
Ret	12	(France) Georges Bouriano	Bugatti T35B	14	Steering damage	16
Ret	34	(Italy) Baconin Borzacchini	Maserati 26B	13	Brakes, crash	2
Ret	2	(Germany) Max Arco-Zinneberg	Mercedes-Benz SSK	1	Crash	15
DNS	4	(Germany) Rudolf Caracciola	Mercedes-Benz SSK		Excluded	
DNS	30	(United Kingdom) Bobby Bowes	Frazer Nash		Excluded	
DNA	10	(Austria) Emil Frankl	Steyr		Did not appear	
DNA	38	Emil Bourlier	Talbot 700		Withdrawn	
DNA	40	(Italy) Enzo Ferrari	Alfa Romeo P2		Did not appear	
DNA	44	(Kingdom of Yugoslavia) Veličkovič	Bugatti T37A		Did not appear	
DNA	?	(Italy) Giuseppe Campari	Alfa Romeo P2		Did not appear	

Grand Prix Race
1930 Grand Prix season
Previous race: 1929 Monaco Grand Prix	Monaco Grand Prix	Next race: 1931 Monaco Grand Prix
