= Automobile Club de Monaco =

Monégasque motoring club

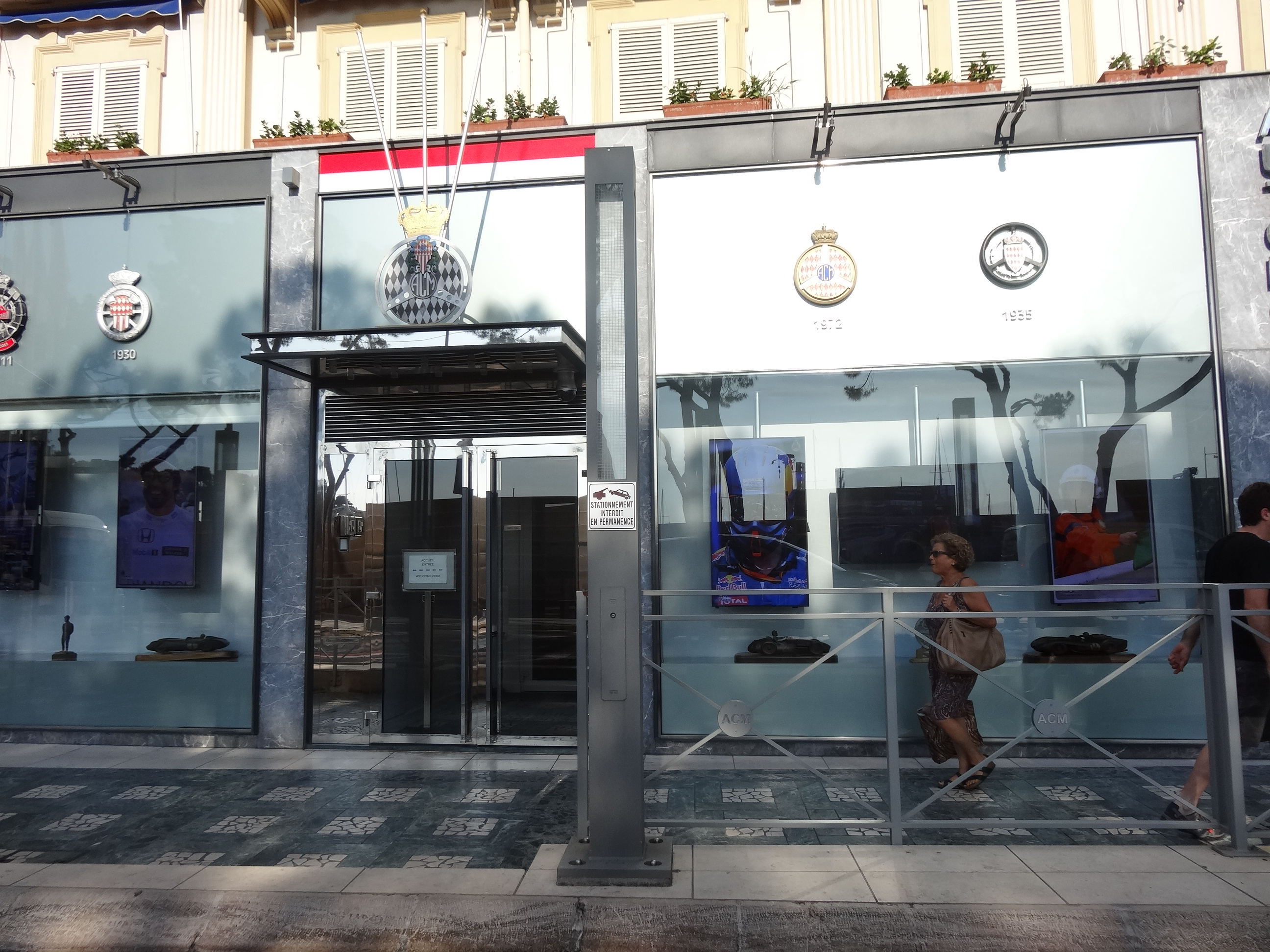
- Headquarters of the ACM
- Sport: Motorsport
- Jurisdiction: Monaco
- Abbreviation: ACM
- Founded: 1890 (as the SVM); 1925 (as the ACM)
- Headquarters: 23 Boulevard Albert 1er, Monaco
- President: Michel Boeri

Official website
- acm.mc/en

The Automobile Club de Monaco (ACM) is a motoring club based in Monaco. The club serves as the governing body for motorsport within Monaco, and it organises the prestigious Monaco Grand Prix and Monte Carlo Rally. The ACM is a member of the Fédération Internationale de l'Automobile (FIA), representing Monaco as a mobility and sporting club.

== History ==
Founded in 1890 as an association of cyclists called the Sport Vélocipédique Monégasque (SVM), the club began to incorporate motorists in 1907 and was renamed the Sport Automobile et Vélocipédique de Monaco (SAVM). Alexandre Noghès, the SAVM's president, started planning the principality's first international motorsport event, the Monte Carlo Rally, at the behest of Albert I, Prince of Monaco. The rally would start at points across Europe, then converge on Monaco to finish. The club ceased to organise cycling events following the First World War and was renamed the Automobile Club de Monaco (ACM) in 1925.

The ACM applied to the AIACR (the forerunner to the FIA) to be upgraded from a regional French club to a full national member, but had their application refused because no motorsport event was held entirely within Monaco's borders. Antony Noghès, the son of the club's President, organised the inaugural Monaco Grand Prix in 1929 on a circuit around the streets of Monaco, and the ACM was promptly admitted to the AIACR. The Monaco Grand Prix was part of the European Championship in the 1930s, and was included in the inaugural Formula One World Championship in 1950. The Grand Prix has been held continuously since 1955, and despite minor modifications over the years, it is still largely run over the same circuit as the inaugural race in 1929.

The ACM also organises the Historic Grand Prix of Monaco, a series of races for historic Grand Prix cars held over the Circuit de Monaco, and the Rallye Monte-Carlo Historique classic rally. Other motorsport events held by the club include the Monaco ePrix and the Junior Monaco Kart Cup.

== See also ==
- Monaco Grand Prix
- Monaco
