= Monaco Grand Prix =

Formula One motor race

- Circuit de Monaco

Race information
- Number of times held: 83
- First held: 1929
- Most wins (drivers): (Brazil) Ayrton Senna (6)
- Most wins (constructors): (United Kingdom) McLaren (16)
- Circuit length: 3.337 km (2.074 miles)
- Race length: 260.286 km (161.734 miles)
- Laps: 78

Last race (2026)

Pole position
- (Italy) Kimi Antonelli; Mercedes; 1:12.051

Podium
- 1. (Italy) K. Antonelli; Mercedes; 2:23:31.243; 2. (United Kingdom) L. Hamilton; Ferrari; +6.271; 3. (France) I. Hadjar; Red Bull Racing-Red Bull Ford; +23.394

Fastest lap
- (Italy) Kimi Antonelli; Mercedes; 1:13.481

The Monaco Grand Prix (French: Grand Prix de Monaco) is a Formula One motor racing event held annually on the Circuit de Monaco, in late May or early June. Run since 1929, it is widely considered to be one of the most important and prestigious automobile races in the world, and is one of the races—along with the Indianapolis 500 and the 24 Hours of Le Mans—that form the Triple Crown of Motorsport. It is the only Grand Prix that does not adhere to the FIA's mandated 305-kilometre (190-mile) minimum race distance for Formula One races.

The race is held on a narrow course laid out in the streets of Monaco, with many elevation changes and tight corners as well as the tunnel, making it one of the most demanding circuits in Formula One. In spite of the relatively low average speeds, the Monaco circuit is a dangerous place to race due to how narrow the track is, and the race often involves the intervention of the safety car.

The first Monaco Grand Prix took place on 14 April 1929, and the race eventually became part of the pre-Second World War European Championship and was included in the first World Championship of Drivers in 1950. It was twice designated the European Grand Prix, in 1955 and 1963, when this title was an honorary designation given each year to one Grand Prix race in Europe. Graham Hill was known as "Mr. Monaco" due to his five Monaco wins in the 1960s. Ayrton Senna won the race more times than any other driver, with six victories, winning five races consecutively between 1989 and 1993. In the 83 editions of the Monaco Grand Prix, only two Monégasque drivers have won the race, Louis Chiron in 1931 and Charles Leclerc in 2024.

The circuit has been called "an exceptional location of glamour and prestige".

In the 1950s, the Indianapolis 500 was part of the drivers World Championships, with separate dates, while since the 1960, when F1 Champions like Jim Clark and Graham Hill won the Indy 500, the events often overlapped. Prior to 2026, the Formula One event in May, often on Ascension Thursday weekend, collided with major US events held on Memorial Day weekend at the end of May, like the Indianapolis 500 (IndyCar Series) and the Coca-Cola 600 (NASCAR Cup Series).

William Grover-Williams driving a Bugatti Type 35B at the 1929 Monaco Grand Prix

== History ==
=== Origins ===
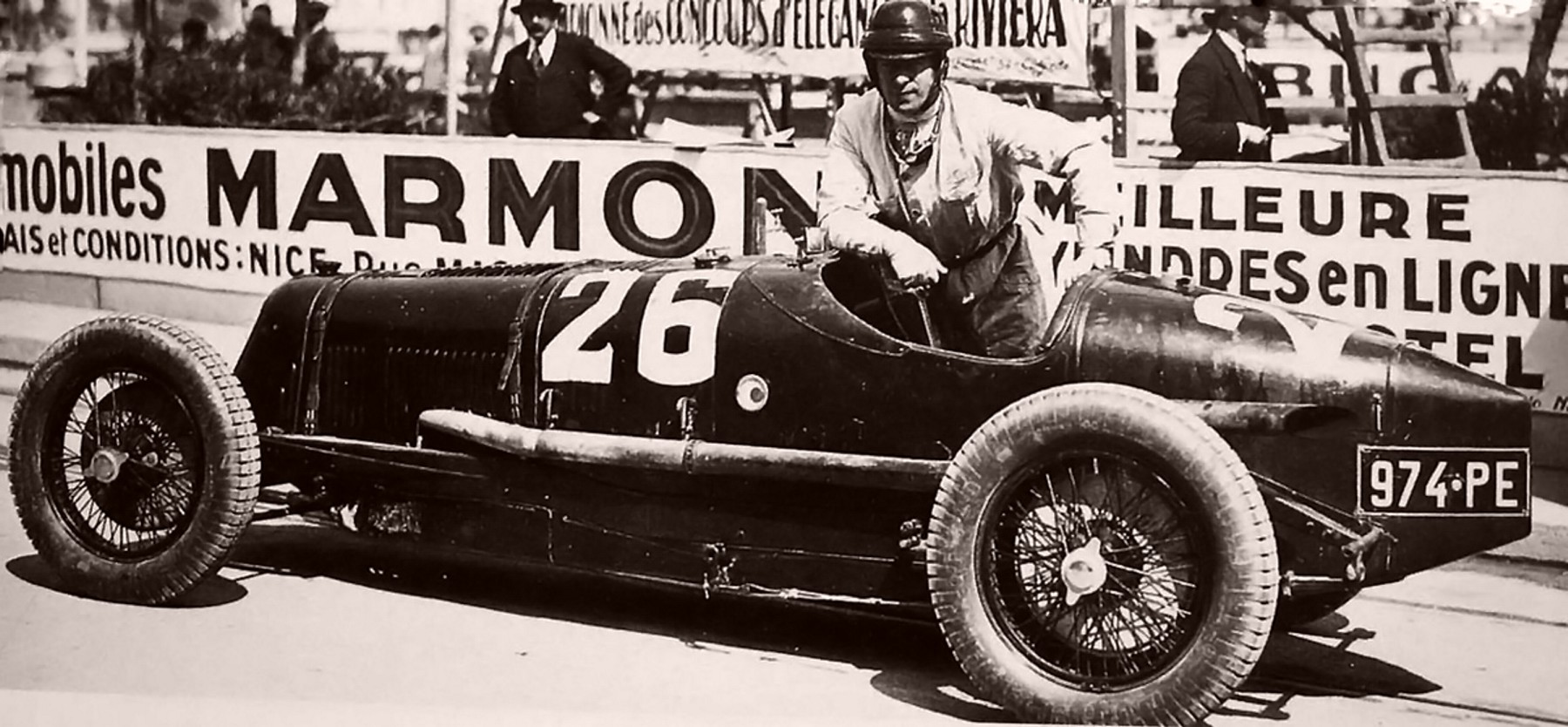
Maserati Tipo 26B at the 1929 Grand Prix

Like many European races, the Monaco Grand Prix predates the current World Championship. The principality's first Grand Prix was organised in 1929 by Antony Noghès, under the auspices of Prince Louis II, through the Automobile Club de Monaco (ACM), of which he was president. The ACM organised the Rallye Automobile Monte Carlo, and in 1928 applied to the Association Internationale des Automobiles Clubs Reconnus (AIACR), the international governing body of motorsport, to be upgraded from a regional French club to full national status. Their application was refused due to the lack of a major motorsport event held wholly within Monaco's boundaries. The rally could not be considered, as it mostly used the roads of other European countries.

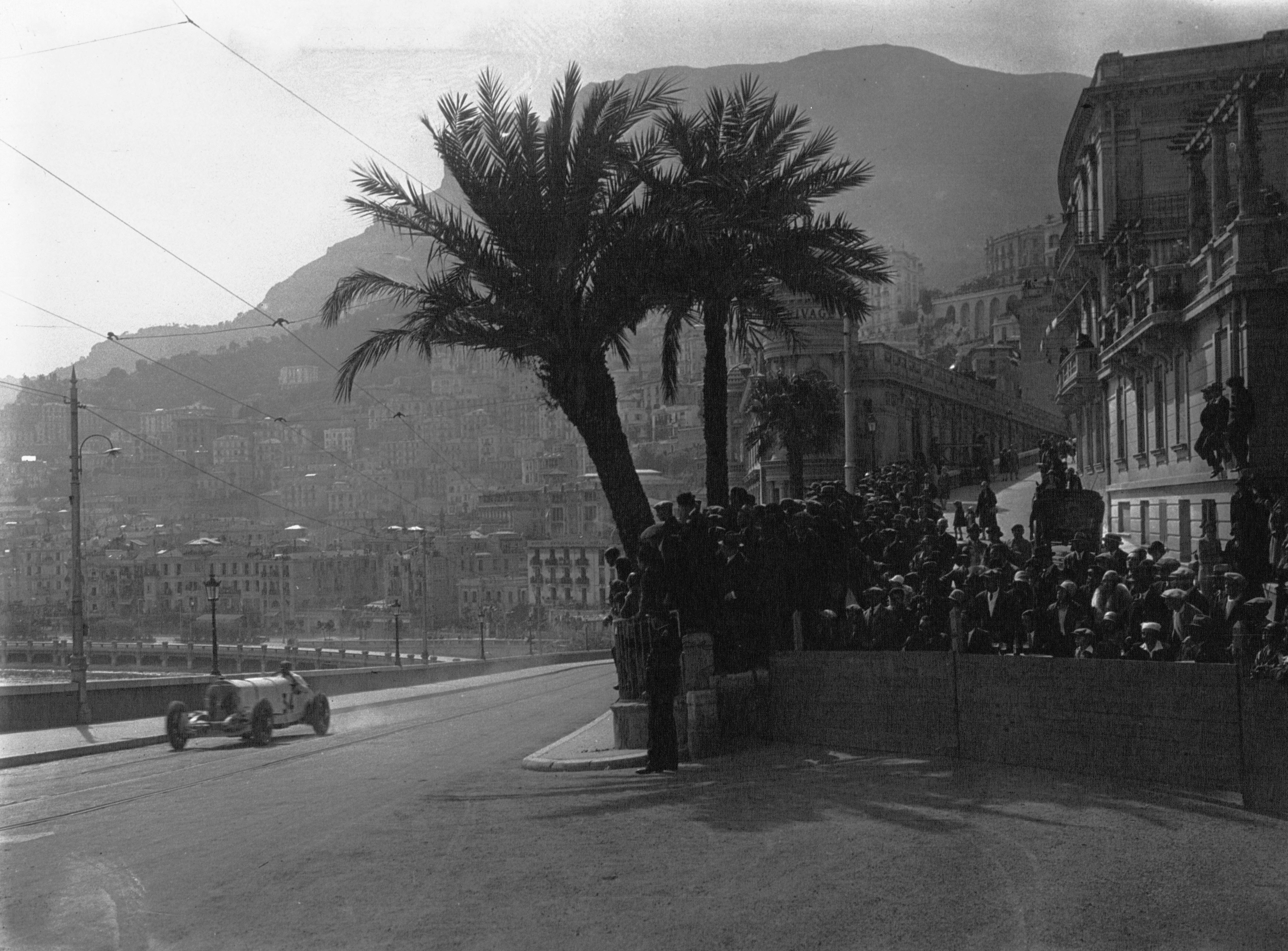
Caracciola at the 1929 Monaco GP

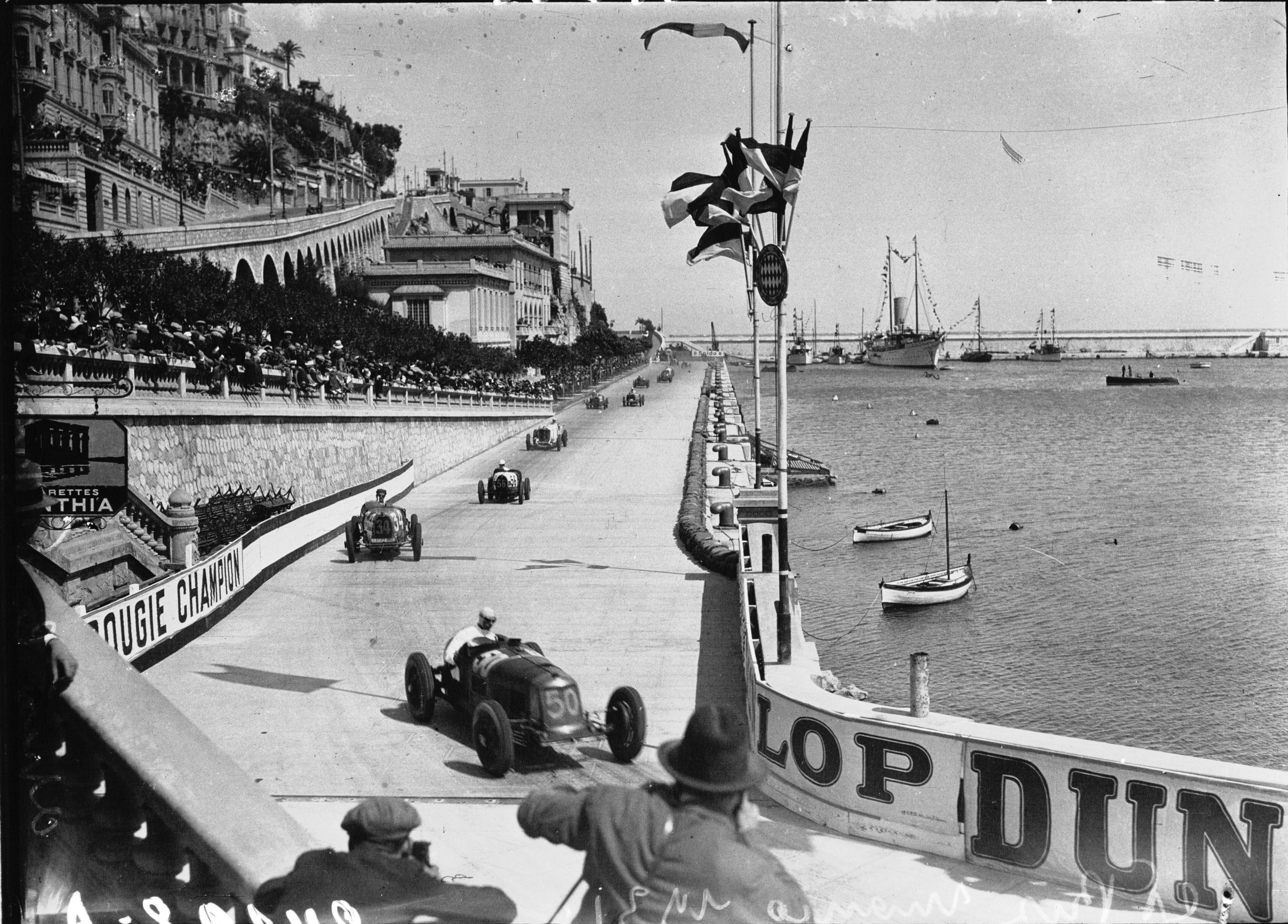
Start of the 1931 Grand Prix

To attain full national status, Noghès proposed the creation of an automobile Grand Prix in the streets of Monte Carlo. He obtained the official sanction of Prince Louis II and the support of Monégasque Grand Prix driver Louis Chiron. Chiron thought Monaco's topography was well-suited to setting up a race track.

The first race, held on 14 April 1929, was won by William Grover-Williams (using the pseudonym "Williams"), driving a works Bugatti Type 35B. It was an invitation-only event, but not all of those who were invited decided to attend the race which matched very different types of cars, as in Formula Libre. The leading Maserati and Alfa Romeo drivers decided not to compete, but Bugatti was well represented. Mercedes at the time had no 2-litre Grand Prix car, but the big heavy 7-litre SSK sportscar, and sent their leading driver, Rudolf Caracciola, to deal with it. Starting fifteenth, Caracciola drove a fighting race, taking his SSK into the lead before wasting 4 1/2 minutes on refuelling and a tyre change to finish second. Another driver who competed using a pseudonym was "Georges Philippe", the Baron Philippe de Rothschild. Chiron was unable to compete, having a prior commitment to compete in the Indianapolis 500.

Caracciola's SSK was refused permission to race the following year, but Chiron did compete (in the works Bugatti Type 35C), when he was beaten by privateer René Dreyfus and his Bugatti Type 35B, and finished second. Chiron took victory in the 1931 race driving a Bugatti. He remained the only native of Monaco to have won the event until 2024.

=== Pre-war ===
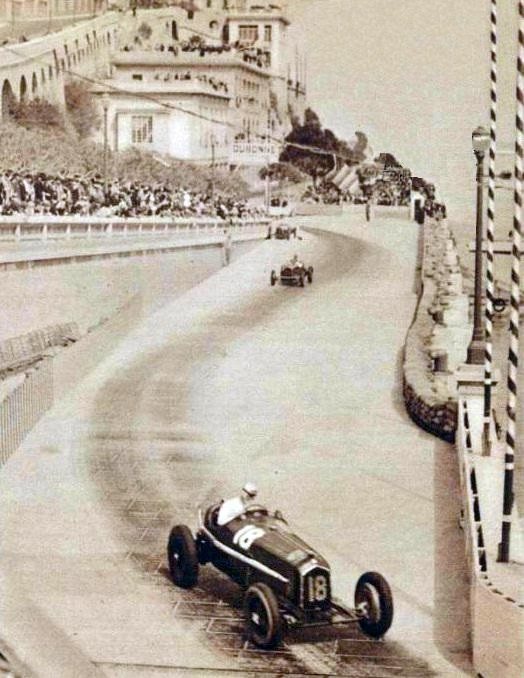
1935 Grand Prix

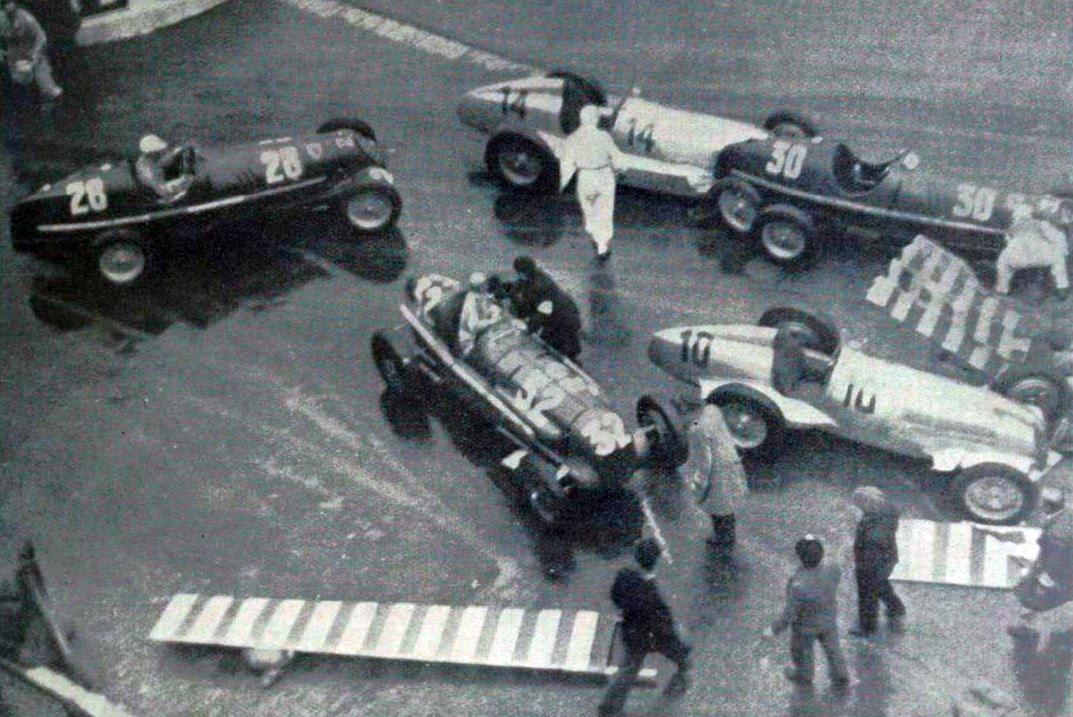
The 1936 Monaco Grand Prix

The race quickly grew in importance after its inception. Because of the high number of races which were being termed 'Grands Prix', the AIACR formally recognised the most important race of each of its affiliated national automobile clubs as International Grands Prix, or Grandes Épreuves, and in 1933 Monaco was ranked as such alongside the French, Belgian, Italian, and Spanish Grands Prix. That year's race was the first Grand Prix in which grid positions were decided, as they are now, by practice time rather than the established method of balloting. The race saw Achille Varzi and Tazio Nuvolari exchange the lead many times before the race settled in Varzi's favour on the final lap when Nuvolari's car caught fire.

The race became a round of the new European Championship in 1936, when stormy weather and a broken oil line led to a series of crashes, eliminating the Mercedes-Benzes of Chiron, Fagioli, and von Brauchitsch, as well as Bernd Rosemeyer's Typ C for newcomer Auto Union; Rudolf Caracciola, proving the truth of his nickname, Regenmeister (Rainmaster), went on to win. In 1937, von Brauchitsch duelled Caracciola before coming out on top. It was the last prewar Grand Prix at Monaco, for in 1938, the lack of profits for organisers, and demand for nearly £500 (approximately £29000 adjusted to 2025 inflation) in appearance money per top entrant led AIACR to cancel the event, while looming war overtook it in 1939, and the Second World War ended organised racing in Europe until 1945.

=== Post-war Grand Prix ===
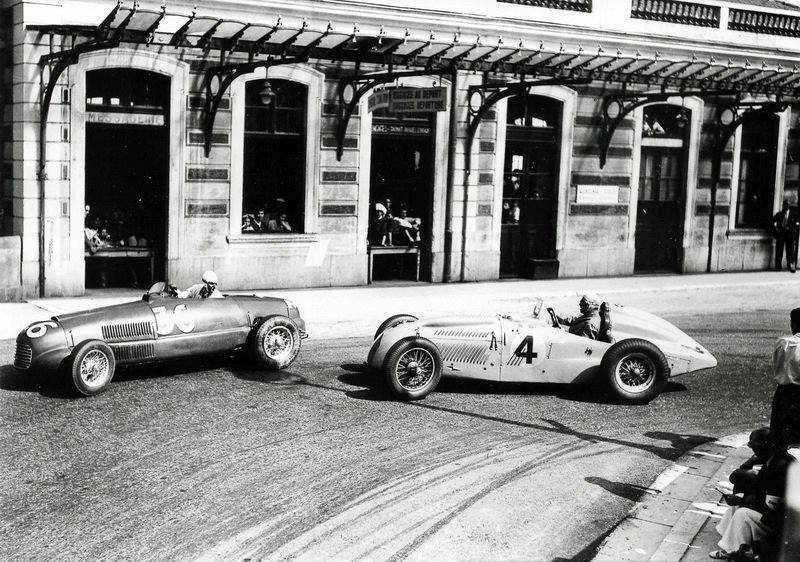
1948 Grand Prix

Racing in Europe started again on 9 September 1945 at the Bois de Boulogne Park in the city of Paris, four months and one day after the end of the war in Europe. However, the Monaco Grand Prix was not run between 1945 and 1947 due to financial reasons. In 1946, a new premier racing category, Grand Prix, was defined by the Fédération Internationale de l'Automobile (FIA), the successor of the AIACR, based on the pre-war voiturette class. A Monaco Grand Prix was run to this formula in 1948, won by the future world champion Nino Farina in a Maserati 4CLT.

The 1948 race also included a motorbike race.

=== Formula One ===
==== Early championship days ====
The 1949 event was cancelled due to the death of Prince Louis II; it was included in the new Formula One World Drivers' Championship the following year. The race provided future five-time world champion Juan Manuel Fangio with his first win in a World Championship race, as well as third place for the 51-year-old Louis Chiron, his best result in the World Championship era. However, there was no race in 1951 due to budgetary concerns and a lack of regulations in the sport.

1952 was the first of the two years in which the World Drivers' Championship was run to less powerful Formula Two regulations. The race was run to sports car rules instead, and it did not form part of the World Championship.

No races were held in 1953 or 1954 due to the fact that the car regulations were not finalized.

The Monaco Grand Prix returned in 1955, again as part of the Formula One World Championship, and this would begin a streak of 64 consecutive years in which the race was held. In the 1955 race, Maurice Trintignant won in Monte Carlo for the first time and Chiron again scored points and at 56 became the oldest driver to compete in a Formula One Grand Prix. It was not until 1957, when Fangio won again, that the Grand Prix saw a double winner. Between 1954 and 1961 Fangio's former Mercedes colleague, Stirling Moss, went one better, as did Trintignant, who won the race again in 1958 driving a Cooper. The 1961 race saw Moss fend off three works Ferrari 156s in a year-old privateer Rob Walker Racing Team Lotus 18 to take his third Monaco victory.

==== Graham Hill's era ====
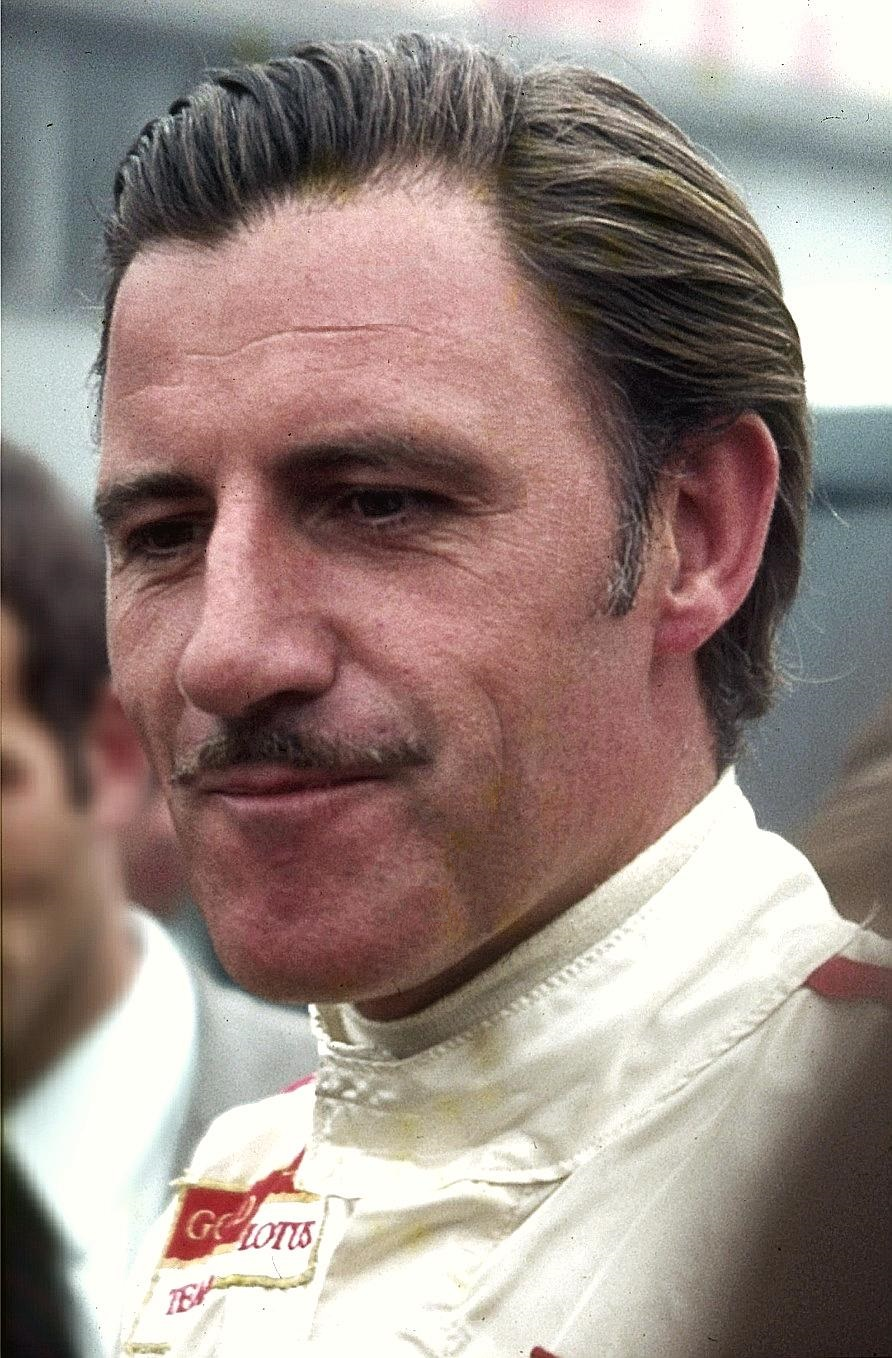
Graham Hill won five of his 14 Grands Prix at Monaco.

Britain's Graham Hill won the race five times in the 1960s and became known as "King of Monaco" and "Mr. Monaco". He first won in 1963, and then won the next two years. In the 1965 race, he took pole position and led from the start, but went up an escape road on lap 25 to avoid hitting a slow backmarker. Re-joining in fifth place, Hill set several new lap records on the way to winning. The race was also notable for Jim Clark's absence (he was participating in the Indianapolis 500), and for Paul Hawkins's Lotus ending up in the harbour. Hill's teammate, Briton Jackie Stewart, won in 1966 and New Zealander Denny Hulme won in 1967, but Hill won the next two years, the 1969 event being his final Formula One championship victory, by which time he was a double Formula One world champion.

==== Track alterations, safety, and increasing business interests ====
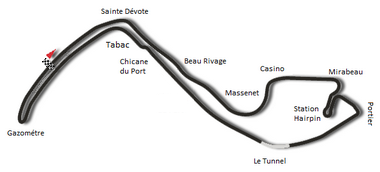
Monaco circuit from 1955 to 1972

By the start of the 1970s, efforts by Jackie Stewart saw several Formula One events cancelled because of safety concerns. For the 1969 event, Armco barriers were placed at specific points for the first time in the circuit's history. Before that, the circuit's conditions were (aside from the removal of people's production cars parked on the side of the road) virtually identical to everyday road use. If a driver went off, he had a chance to crash into whatever was next to the track (buildings, trees, lamp posts, glass windows, and even a train station), and in Alberto Ascari's and Paul Hawkins's cases, the harbour water, because the concrete road the course used had no Armco to protect the drivers from going off the track and into the Mediterranean. The circuit gained more Armco in specific points for the next two races, and by 1972, the circuit was almost completely Armco-lined. For the first time in its history, the Monaco circuit was altered in 1972, as the pits were moved next to the waterfront straight between the chicane and Tabac, and the chicane was moved further forward right before Tabac, becoming the junction point between the pits and the course. The course was changed again for the 1973 race. The Rainier III Nautical Stadium was constructed where the straight that went behind the pits was, and the circuit introduced a double chicane that went around the new swimming pool (this chicane complex is known today as "Swimming Pool"). This created space for a whole new pit facility, and in 1976 the course was altered yet again; the Sainte Devote corner was made slower and a chicane was placed right before the pit straight.

By the early 1970s, as Brabham team owner Bernie Ecclestone started to marshal the collective bargaining power of the Formula One Constructors Association (FOCA), Monaco was prestigious enough to become an early bone of contention. Historically, the number of cars permitted in a race was decided by the race organiser, in this case the ACM, which had always set a low number of around 16. In 1972, Ecclestone started to negotiate deals which relied on FOCA guaranteeing at least 18 entrants for every race. A stand-off over this issue left the 1972 race in jeopardy until the ACM gave in and agreed that 26 cars could participate – the same number permitted at most other circuits. Two years later, in 1974, the ACM got the numbers back down to 18.

Because of its tight confines, slow average speeds, and punishing nature, Monaco has often thrown up unexpected results. In the 1982 race, René Arnoux led the first 15 laps before retiring. Alain Prost then led until four laps from the end, when he spun off on the wet track, hit the barriers and lost a wheel, giving Riccardo Patrese the lead. Patrese himself spun with only a lap and a half to go, letting Didier Pironi through to the front, followed by Andrea de Cesaris. On the last lap, Pironi ran out of fuel in the tunnel, but De Cesaris also ran out of fuel before he could overtake. In the meantime, Patrese had bump-started his car and went through to score his first Grand Prix win.

In 1983, the ACM became entangled in the disagreements between Fédération Internationale du Sport Automobile (FISA) and FOCA. The ACM, with the agreement of Bernie Ecclestone, negotiated an individual television rights deal with ABC in the United States. This broke an agreement enforced by FISA for a single central negotiation of television rights. Jean-Marie Balestre, president of FISA, announced that the Monaco Grand Prix would not form part of the Formula One world championship in 1985. The ACM fought their case in the French courts. They won the case and the race was eventually reinstated.

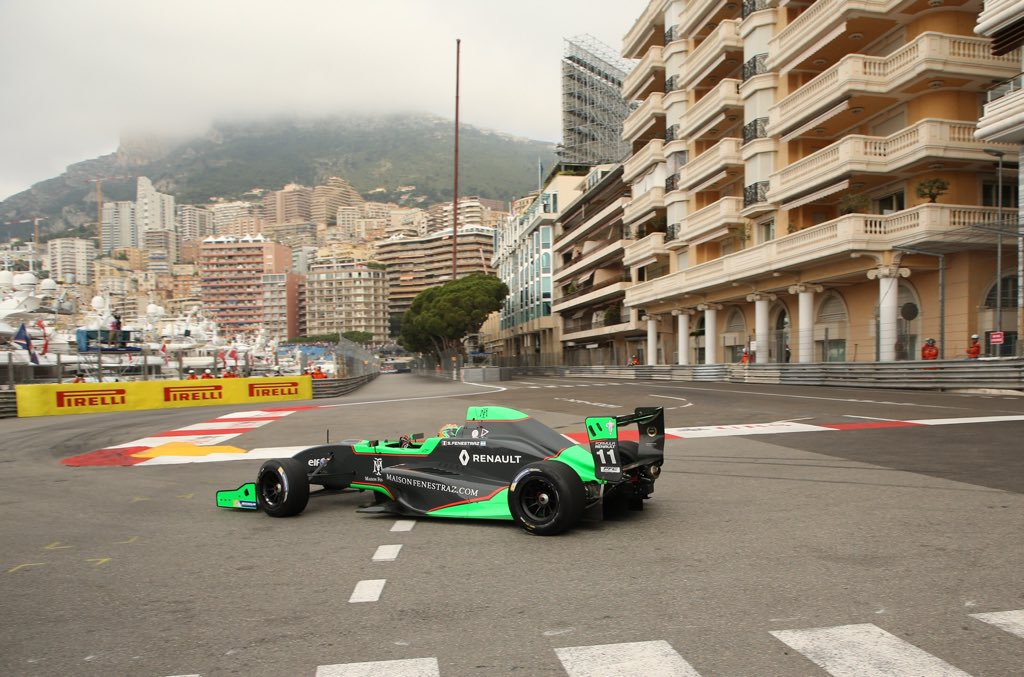
Nouvelle Chicane in the 2017 race

In 1986, the Nouvelle Chicane was added by expanding into the nearby water to make the track wider.

==== Era of Prost & Senna dominance ====
Year	Driver	Constructor	Report
1984	(France) Alain Prost	McLaren-TAG	Report
1985	(France) Alain Prost	McLaren-TAG	Report
1986	(France) Alain Prost	McLaren-TAG	Report
1987	(Brazil) Ayrton Senna	Lotus-Honda	Report
1988	(France) Alain Prost	McLaren-Honda	Report
1989	(Brazil) Ayrton Senna	McLaren-Honda	Report
1990	(Brazil) Ayrton Senna	McLaren-Honda	Report
1991	(Brazil) Ayrton Senna	McLaren-Honda	Report
1992	(Brazil) Ayrton Senna	McLaren-Honda	Report
1993	(Brazil) Ayrton Senna	McLaren-Ford	Report

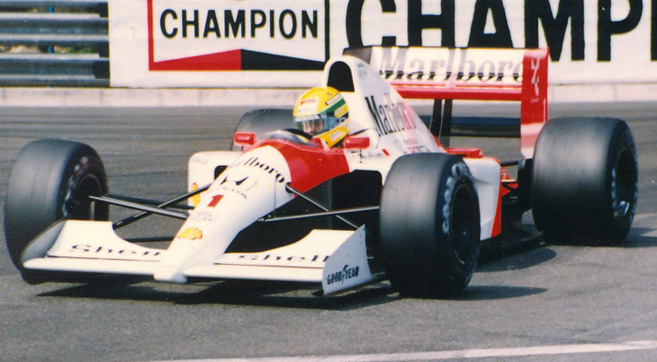
Senna in 1991 at Monaco

For the decade from 1984 to 1993, the race was won by only two drivers, arguably the two best drivers in Formula One at the time – Frenchman Alain Prost and Brazilian Ayrton Senna. Prost, already a winner of the support race for Formula Three cars in 1979, took his first Monaco win at the 1984 race. The race started 45 minutes late after heavy rain. Prost led briefly before Nigel Mansell overtook him on lap 11. Mansell crashed out five laps later, letting Prost back into the lead. On lap 27, Prost led from Ayrton Senna's Toleman and Stefan Bellof's Tyrrell. Senna was catching Prost, and Bellof was catching both of them in the only naturally aspirated car in the race. However, on lap 31, the race was controversially stopped due to conditions deemed to be undriveable. Later, FISA fined the clerk of the course, Jacky Ickx, $6,000 and suspended his licence for not consulting the stewards before stopping the race. The drivers received only half of the points that would usually be awarded, as the race had been stopped before two-thirds of the intended race distance had been completed.

Prost won 1985 after polesitter Senna retired with a blown Renault engine in his Lotus after over-revving it at the start, and Michele Alboreto in the Ferrari retook the lead twice, but he went off the track at Sainte-Devote, where Brazilian Nelson Piquet and Italian Riccardo Patrese had a huge accident only a few laps previously and oil and debris littered the track. Prost passed Alboreto, who retook the Frenchman, and then he punctured a tyre after running over bodywork debris from the Piquet/Patrese accident, which dropped him to 4th. He was able to pass his Roman countrymen Andrea De Cesaris and Elio de Angelis, but finished 2nd behind Prost. The French Prost dominated 1986 after starting from pole position, a race where the Nouvelle Chicane had been changed on the grounds of safety.

Senna holds the record for the most victories in Monaco, with six, including five consecutive wins between 1989 and 1993, as well as eight podium finishes in ten starts. His 1987 win was the first time a car with an active suspension had won a Grand Prix. He won this race after Briton Nigel Mansell in a Williams-Honda went out with a broken exhaust. His win was very popular with the people of Monaco, and when he was arrested on the Monday following the race for riding a motorcycle without wearing a helmet, he was released by the officers after they realised who he was. Senna dominated 1988 and was able to get ahead of his teammate Prost while the Frenchman was held up for most of the race by Austrian Gerhard Berger in a Ferrari. By the time Prost got past Berger, he pushed as hard as he could and set a lap some 6 seconds faster than Senna's; Senna then set 2 fastest laps, and while pushing as hard as possible, he touched the barrier at the Portier corner and crashed into the Armco separating the road from the Mediterranean. Senna was so upset that he went back to his Monaco flat and was not heard from until the evening. Prost went on to win for the fourth time.

Senna dominated 1989 while Prost was stuck behind backmarker René Arnoux and others; the Brazilian also dominated 1990 and 1991. At the 1992 event Nigel Mansell, who had won all five races held to that point in the season, took pole and dominated the race in his Williams FW14B-Renault. However, with seven laps remaining, Mansell suffered a loose wheel nut and was forced into the pits, emerging behind Senna's McLaren-Honda, who was on worn tyres. Mansell, on fresh tyres, set a lap record almost two seconds quicker than Senna's and closed from 5.2 to 1.9 seconds in only two laps. The pair duelled around Monaco for the final four laps but Mansell could find no way past, finishing just two-tenths of a second behind the Brazilian. It was Senna's fifth win at Monaco, equalling Graham Hill's record. Senna had a poor start to the 1993 event, crashing in practice and qualifying 3rd behind pole-sitter Prost and the rising German star Michael Schumacher. Both of them beat Senna to the first corner, but Prost had to serve a time penalty for jumping the start and Schumacher retired after suspension problems, so Senna took his sixth win to break Graham Hill's record for most wins at the Monaco Grand Prix. Runner-up Damon Hill commented, "If my father was around now, he would be the first to congratulate Ayrton."

==== 1990s: Tragedies and triumphs ====
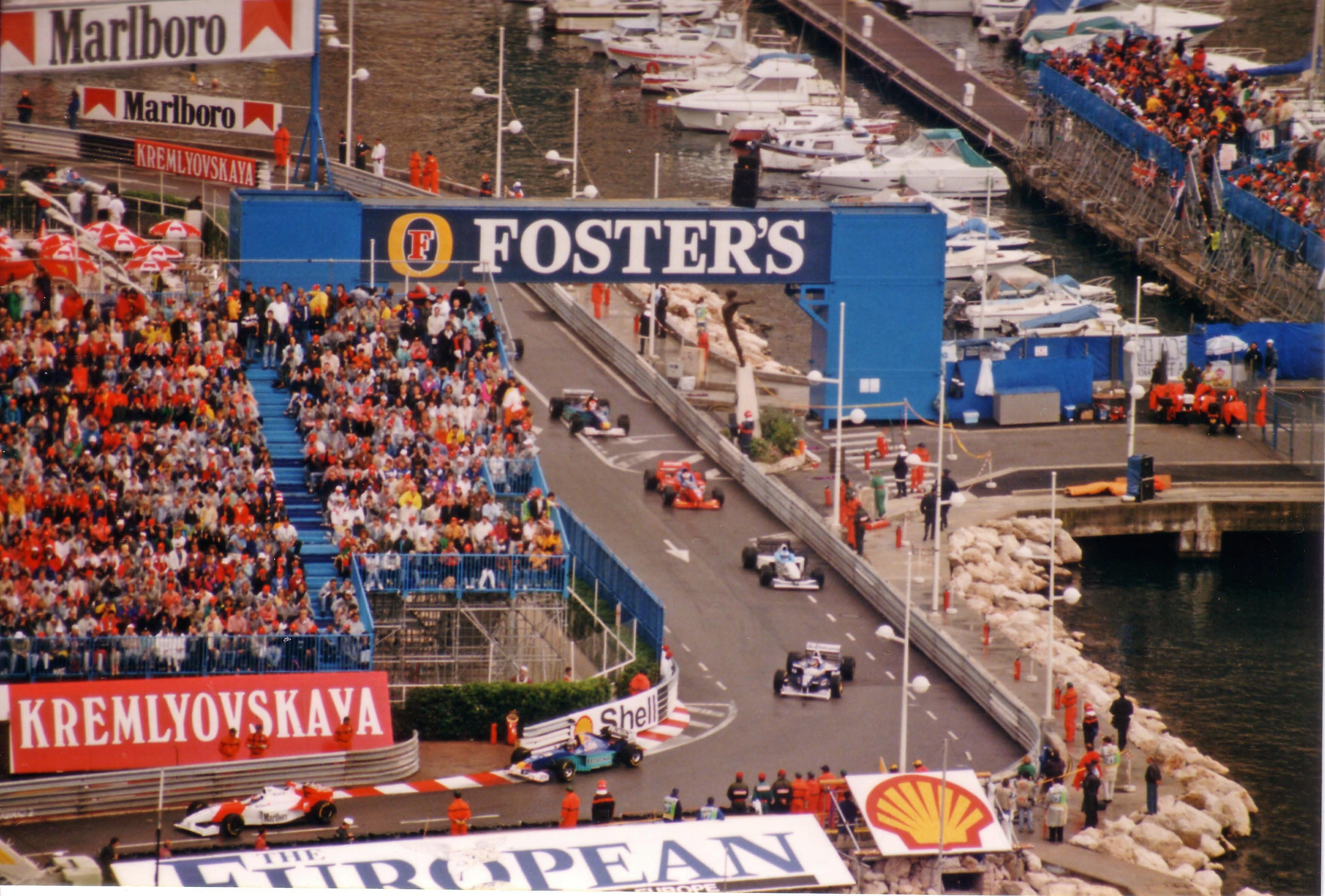
Formation lap for the 1996 Monaco Grand Prix

The 1994 race was an emotional and tragic affair. It came two weeks after the San Marino Grand Prix at Imola in which Austrian Roland Ratzenberger and Ayrton Senna both died in crashes on successive days. During the Monaco event, Austrian Karl Wendlinger had an accident in his Sauber in the tunnel; he went into a coma and was to miss the rest of the season. The German Michael Schumacher won the 1994 Monaco event. Schumacher also won the 1995 event. The 1996 race saw Schumacher take pole position before crashing out on the first lap after being overtaken by Damon Hill. Hill led the first 40 laps before his engine expired in the tunnel. Jean Alesi took the lead but suffered suspension failure 20 laps later. Olivier Panis, who started in 14th place, moved into the lead and stayed there until the end of the race, being pushed all the way by David Coulthard. It was Panis's only win, and the last for his Ligier team. Only three cars crossed the finish line, but seven were classified.

==== 21st century ====
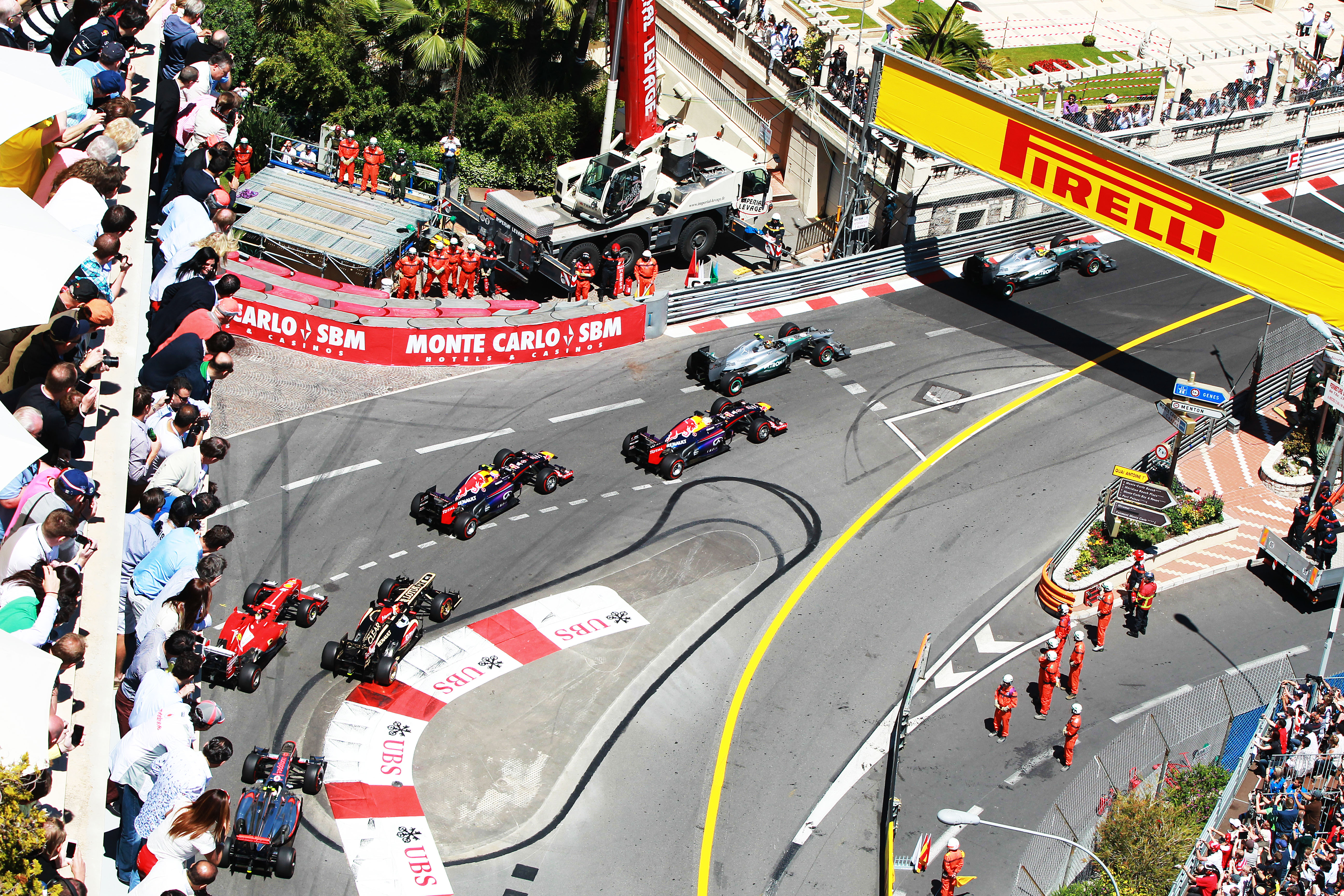
Start of the 2013 Grand Prix

In 2004, land reclamation work was completed, allowing expansion of the pit area with larger temporary garages. A temporary 6,000 seat grandstand would also be constructed in the Swimming Pool area.

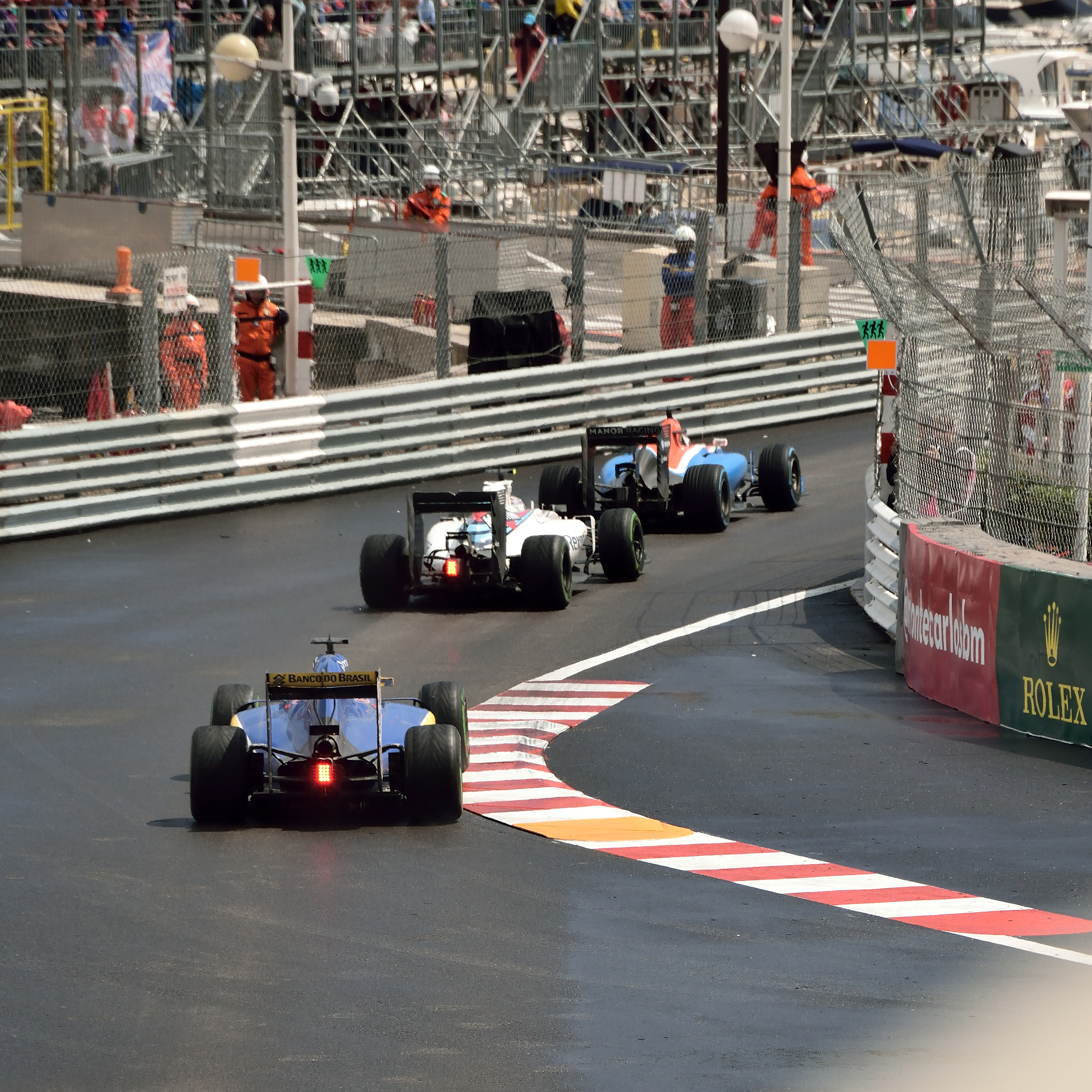
2016 Monaco Grand Prix race

Seven-time world champion Schumacher would eventually win the race five times, matching Graham Hill's record. In his appearance at the 2006 event, he attracted criticism when, while provisionally holding pole position and with the qualifying session drawing to a close, he stopped his car at the Rascasse hairpin, blocking the track and obliging competitors to slow down. Although Schumacher claimed it was the unintentional result of a genuine car failure, the FIA disagreed and he was sent to the back of the grid.

In July 2010, Bernie Ecclestone announced that a 10-year deal had been reached with the race organisers, keeping the race on the calendar until at least 2020.

==== 2020s ====
Due to the COVID-19 pandemic, the FIA announced the 2020 Monaco Grand Prix's postponement, along with the two other races scheduled for May 2020, to help prevent the spread of the virus. However, later the same day the Automobile Club de Monaco confirmed that the Grand Prix was instead cancelled, making 2020 the first time the Grand Prix was not run since 1954. The race returned in 2021.

2022 F1 course at Monaco

The 2022 event saw the Monégasque driver, Charles Leclerc of Scuderia Ferrari, achieve his first Monaco Grand Prix pole position at the Circuit de Monaco (he had taken pole the previous year but could not start due to driveshaft failure). However, a critical strategical error meant Leclerc would drop to fourth, with Sergio Pérez winning the race.

In 2024, Charles Leclerc became the second Monégasque to win the race following Louis Chiron's win in 1931. The race was the first time the top 10 cars finished in their starting order, and there were no successful overtakes.

In November 2024, the ACM signed a new race contract to remain on the F1 calendar until the 2031 season, extending their previous agreement which was set to expire in 2025. As part of this deal, the ACM relinquished advertising rights and television coverage to Formula One Management, with previous races having their television coverage produced by Tele Monte Carlo. From 2026, the race will be held on the first weekend of June, and will therefore no longer clash with the Indianapolis 500 and the Coca-Cola 600. Another extension to 2035 was confirmed in September 2025.

The fastest yet qualifying lap was set by Lando Norris in qualifying (Q3) for the 2025 Monaco Grand Prix, at a time of 1:09.954. The 2025 Monaco Grand Prix carried different tyre usage rules than the norm for the 2025. Drivers were required to make two stops to use three sets of tyres during the race, and they had to use at least two different compounds. In wet weather conditions, two stops would have been mandatory, but the two compound minimum would have been removed. These changes did not improve the racing quality and overtake opportunities, and Lando Norris managed to win the race after starting on pole position. For 2026, the requirement to make a minimum two-stop strategy was dropped.

== Circuit ==
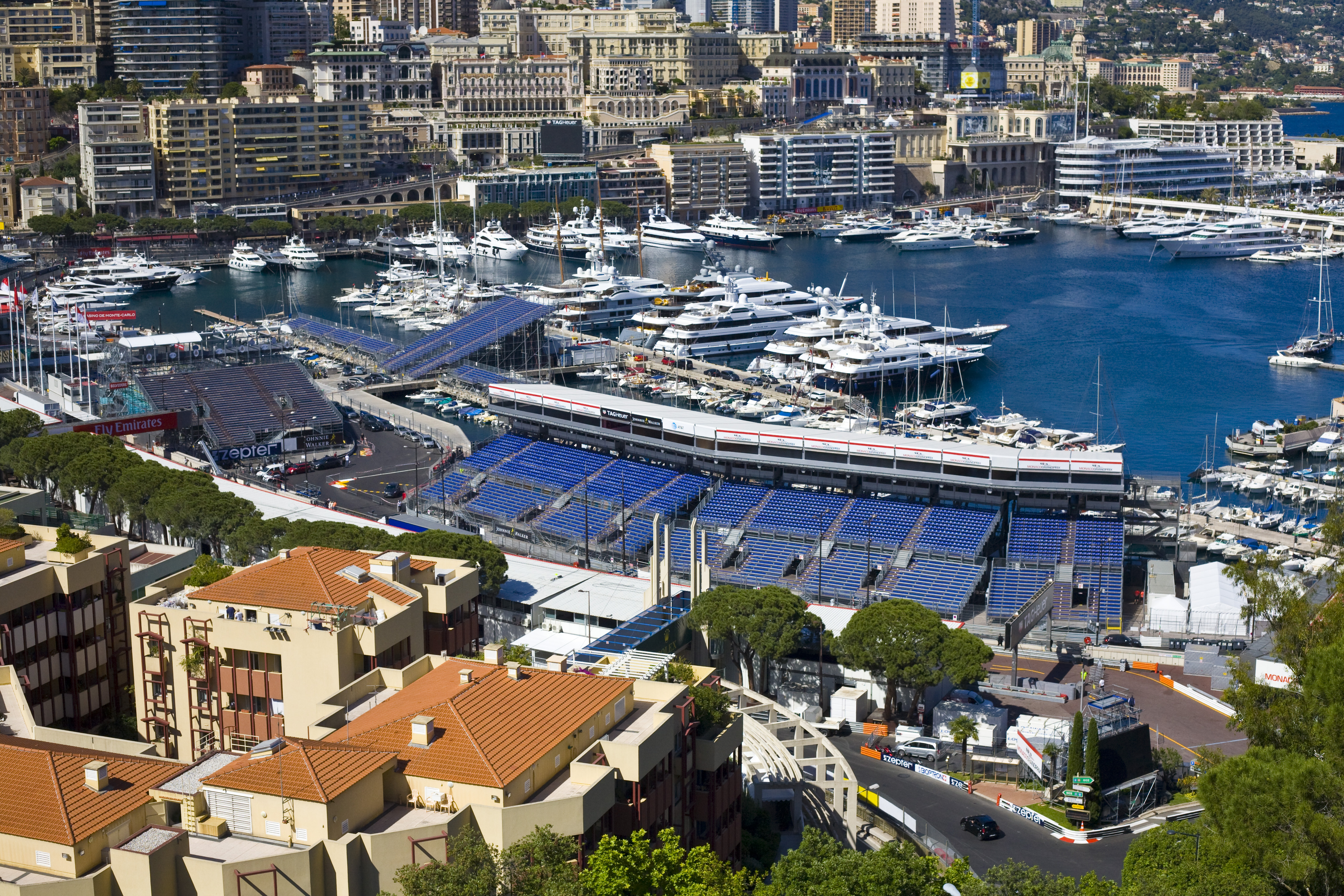
The Monte Carlo harbour during the days of the 2016 Formula One race

The Grand Prix takes place on the Circuit de Monaco which traverses the narrow city streets of Monte Carlo and La Condamine alongside Monaco's harbour, Port Hercules. It has hosted the Grand Prix every time it has been run since 1929 – only the Italian Grand Prix, which has been held at Autodromo Nazionale Monza during every Formula One regulated year except 1980, has a similarly lengthy and close relationship with a single circuit.

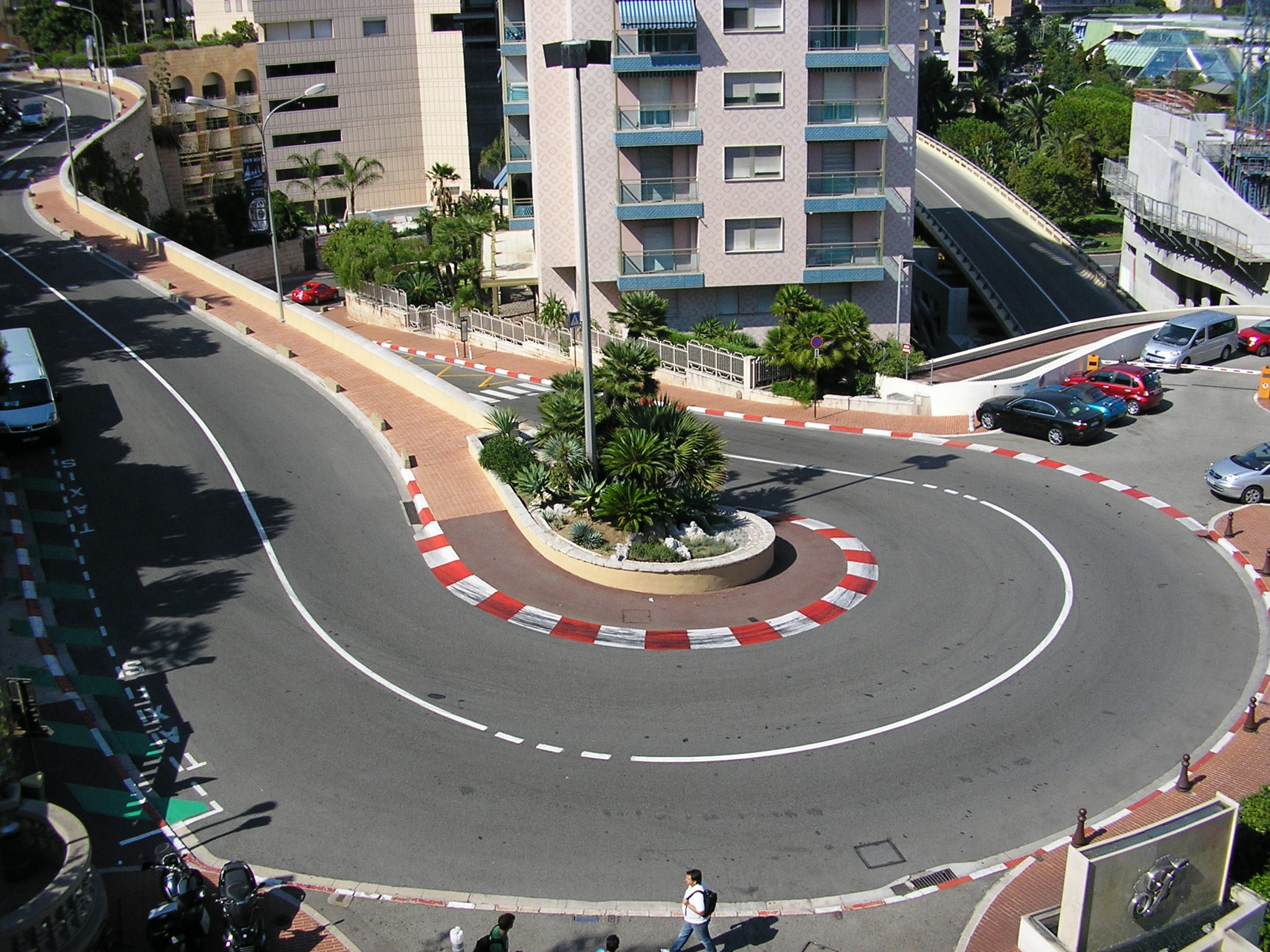
Monaco's famous Fairmont Hairpin turn, both a city street and part of its Grand Prix circuit

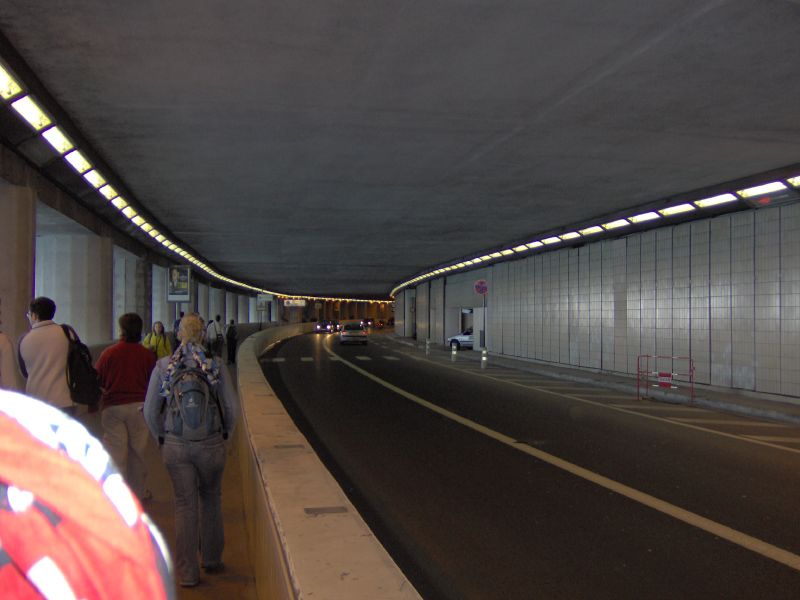
Tunnel section

The race circuit has many elevation changes, tight corners, and a narrow course that requires millimetre accuracy and makes it one of the most demanding tracks in Formula One racing. Drivers will often touch the track walls to achieve a fast lap time. In 1929, La Vie Automobile magazine offered the opinion that "Any respectable traffic system would have covered the track with <<Danger>> sign posts left, right and centre". As of 2025, two drivers have crashed and ended up in the harbour, the most famous being Alberto Ascari in 1955. Despite undergoing minor changes throughout its history, the circuit is largely unchanged since 1929 and remains widely regarded as the ultimate test of driving skills and mental strength. If Monaco were not already an existing Grand Prix, it is unlikely that its street circuit would be permitted to host Formula One due to its short track length and concerns with safety and overtaking. However, as the 'Crown Jewel' of Formula One with a near century-old heritage in motorsport, Monaco is granted some exceptions to accommodate its limited possibilities for expansion.

Triple Formula One champion Nelson Piquet famously described racing at Monaco as "like riding a bicycle around your living room," illustrating the unique challenges posed by the circuit's narrow streets. He further emphasized the significance of victory at Monaco by stating that "a win here was worth two anywhere else".

Notably, the circuit includes a tunnel. The contrast of daylight and gloom when entering/exiting the tunnel presents "challenges not faced elsewhere", as the drivers have to "adjust their vision as they emerge from the tunnel at the fastest point of the track and brake for the chicane in the daylight.".

The fastest-ever qualifying lap was set by Lando Norris in qualifying (Q3) for the 2025 Monaco Grand Prix, at a time of 1:09.954.

=== Viewing areas ===
During the Grand Prix weekend, spectators crowd around the Monaco Circuit. There are a number of temporary grandstands built around the circuit, mostly around the harbour area. The rich and famous spectators often arrive on their boats and the yachts through the harbour. Balconies around Monaco become viewing areas for the race as well. Many hotels and residents cash in on the bird's eye views of the race.

=== Criticism ===
Although Formula One cars have grown in size, the Circuit de Monaco has rarely expanded (with the notable exception of the addition of the Nouvelle Chicane in 1986), limiting overtaking opportunities and on-track entertainment. The circuit has only one DRS zone. Various ideas have been suggested to make the circuit longer, safer, and more conducive to overtakes. One suggestion was to extend the race track along the east side of Hercules harbor and add a second DRS zone. Lewis Hamilton accepted that the Principality was unlikely to widen the roads for the race, but suggested adding "more variability" by introducing more pit stops or special tyre compounds.

The 2024 Monaco Grand Prix was considered particularly dull. Although Formula One mandates a pit stop and using two different tyre compounds at every race, a lap-one red flag allowed drivers to change tyres and tyre compounds, essentially converting their races into a zero-stop race. The impracticality of passing allowed drivers at the front to preserve their tyres by driving very slowly; second-placed Oscar Piastri said that at one point the pace was "slower than Formula 2." The top ten drivers in qualifying finished in the exact same order, and Max Verstappen joked about needing a pillow. The following season, the FIA passed a new rule requiring all drivers to make at least two pit stops at Monaco, with the explicit goal of making the race more entertaining.

== Organization ==
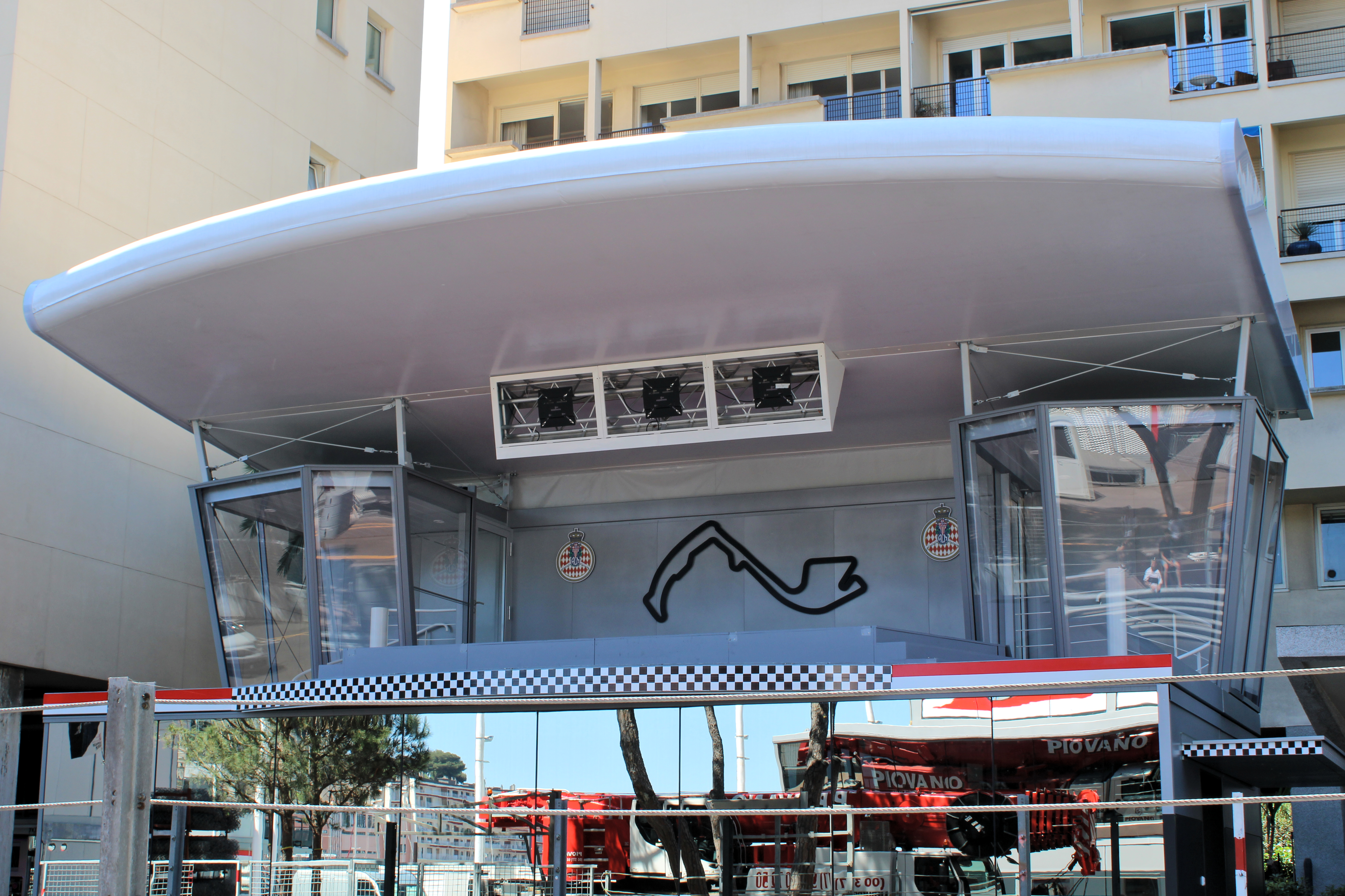
The podium was installed in 2017

The Monaco Grand Prix is organised each year by the Automobile Club de Monaco which also runs the Monte Carlo Rally and previously ran the Junior Monaco Kart Cup.

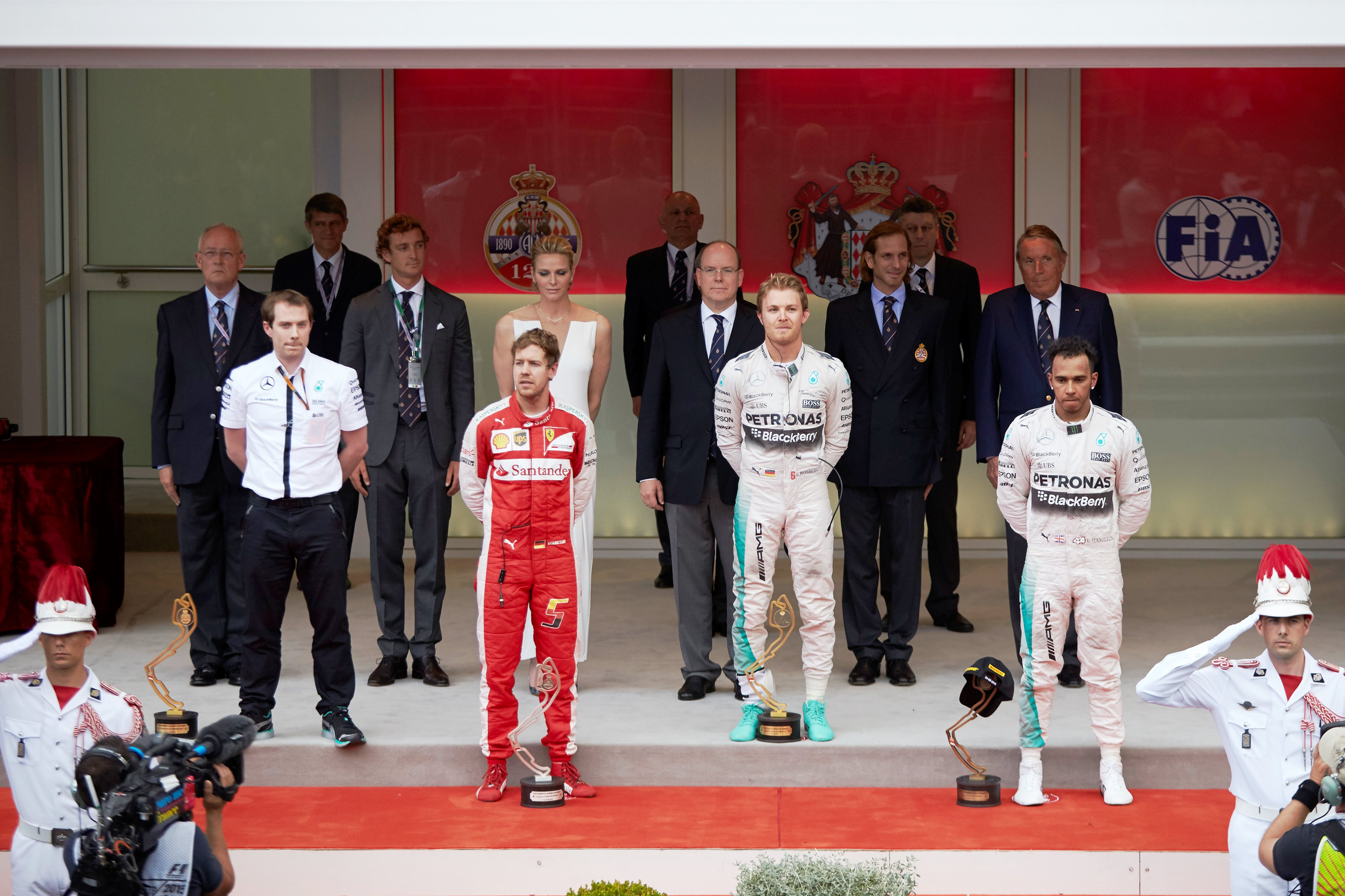
Previously, the ceremony was held in the Royal Box. 2015 Ceremony pictured

The Monaco Grand Prix differs in several ways from other Grands Prix. The practice session for the race was traditionally held on the Thursday preceding the race instead of Friday. This allows the streets to be opened to the public again on Friday. From the 2022 event onwards the first two Formula One practice sessions were held on Friday, bringing the running schedule for Formula One in line with other Grands Prix. Support races are run on Thursday. Until the late 1990s the race started at 3:30 p.m. local time – an hour and a half later than other European Formula One races. Since then the race has fallen in line with the other Formula One races for the convenience of television viewers. Historically, the event was traditionally held on the week of Ascension Day, since 2003 the race has been held in May. From 2026, the race will be held in the first weekend of June.

For many years, the numbers of cars admitted to Grands Prix was at the discretion of the race organisers – Monaco had the smallest grids, ostensibly because of its narrow and twisting track. Only 18 cars were permitted to start the 1975 Monaco Grand Prix, compared to 23 to 26 cars at all other rounds that year.

The erecting of the circuit takes six weeks, and the removal after the race takes three weeks. Until 2017, there was no proper podium at the race. Instead, a section of the track was closed after the race to act as parc fermé, a place where the cars are held for official inspection. The first three drivers in the race left their cars there and walked directly to the royal box where the 'podium' ceremony was held, which was considered a custom for the race. The trophies were handed out before the national anthems for the winning driver and team are played, as opposed to other Grands Prix where the anthems are played first.

== Fame ==
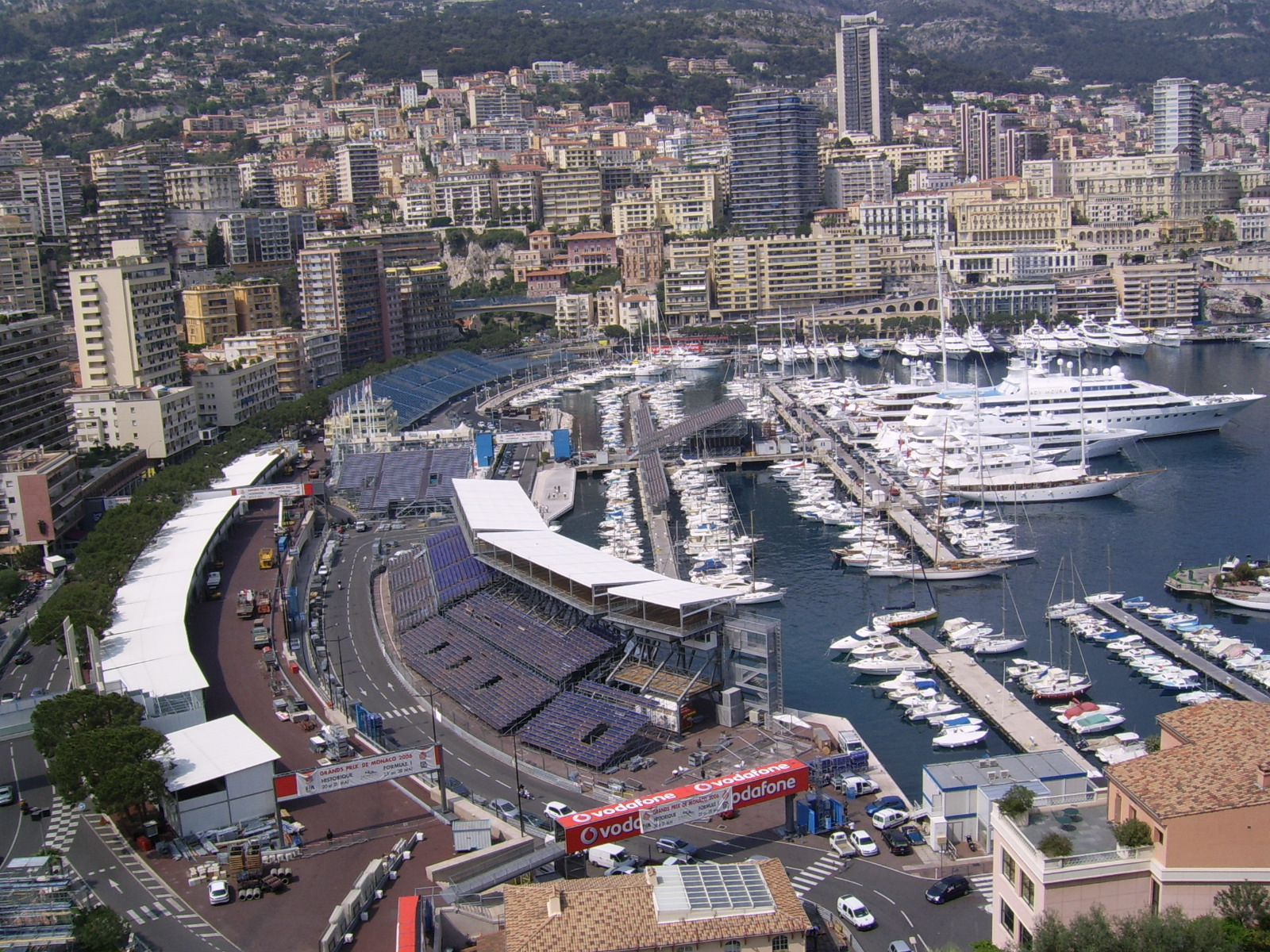
Monaco for the 2006 Grand Prix

The Monaco Grand Prix is widely considered to be one of the most important and prestigious automobile races in the world alongside the Indianapolis 500 and the 24 Hours of Le Mans. These three races are considered to form a Triple Crown of the three most famous motor races in the world. As of 2025, Graham Hill is the only driver to have won the Triple Crown, by winning all three races. The practice session for Monaco overlaps with that for the Indianapolis 500, and the races themselves sometimes clash. As the two races take place on opposite sides of the Atlantic Ocean and form part of different championships, it is difficult for one driver to compete effectively in both during their career. Juan Pablo Montoya and Fernando Alonso are the only active drivers to have won two of the three events.

In awarding its first gold medal for motorsport to Prince Rainier III, the Fédération Internationale de l'Automobile (FIA) characterised the Monaco Grand Prix as contributing "an exceptional location of glamour and prestige" to motorsport. The Grand Prix has been run under the patronage of three generations of Monaco's royal family: Louis II, Rainier III and Albert II, all of whom have taken a close interest in the race. A large part of the principality's income comes from tourists attracted by the warm climate and the famous casino, but it is also a tax haven and is home to many millionaires, including several Formula One drivers.

Monaco has produced four native Formula One drivers—Louis Chiron, André Testut, Olivier Beretta, and Charles Leclerc—but its tax status has made it home to many drivers over the years, including Gilles Villeneuve and Ayrton Senna. Of the 2006 Formula One contenders, several have property in the principality, including Jenson Button and David Coulthard, who was part owner of a hotel there. Because of the small size of the principality and the location of the circuit, drivers whose races end early can usually get back to their apartments in minutes. Ayrton Senna famously retired to his apartment after crashing out of the lead of the 1988 race. In the 2006 race, after retiring due to a mechanical failure while in second place, Kimi Räikkönen retired to his yacht, which was parked in the harbour.

The Grand Prix attracts many celebrities each year who come to experience the prestige of the event. Many large parties are held in the nightclubs, yachts and homes on the Grand Prix weekend, and the Port Hercule fills up with party-goers joining in the celebrations post race.

=== Criticism ===
In the 21st century, several commentators and F1 drivers have called the Grand Prix the most boring race of all circuits, both to drive and to watch as a spectator. Criticism has been directed towards how few overtake attempts are performed, as well as how frequently the driver who sets the pole position wins. Fernando Alonso has said that the race is "the most boring race ever," and Lewis Hamilton stated that the 2022 Grand Prix "wasn't really racing."

== Winners ==
=== By year ===
A pink background indicates an event which was not part of the Formula One World Championship.
A yellow background indicates an event which was part of the pre-war European Championship.

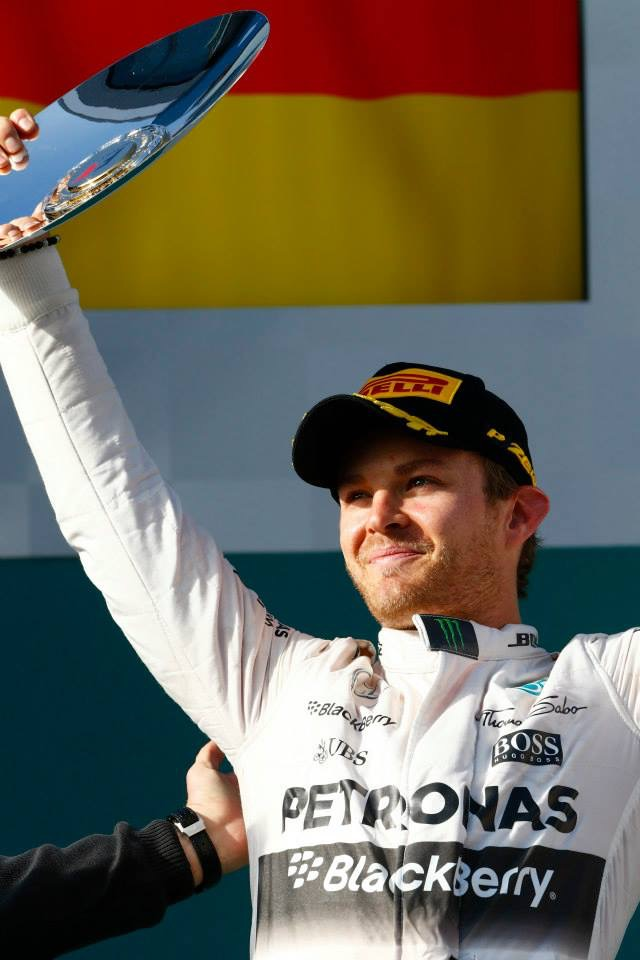
Nico Rosberg won the Monaco Grand Prix three times in a row from 2013 to 2015, racing for Mercedes.

Year	Driver	Constructor	Report
1929	(United Kingdom) William Grover-Williams	Bugatti	Report
1930	(France) René Dreyfus	Bugatti	Report
1931	(Monaco) Louis Chiron	Bugatti	Report
1932	(Italy) Tazio Nuvolari	Alfa Romeo	Report
1933	(Italy) Achille Varzi	Bugatti	Report
1934	(France) Guy Moll	Alfa Romeo	Report
1935	(Italy) Luigi Fagioli	Mercedes	Report
1936	(Germany) Rudolf Caracciola	Mercedes	Report
1937	(Germany) Manfred von Brauchitsch	Mercedes	Report
1938 – 1947	Not held from 1939 to 1944 due to World War II, and in 1938, and 1945 to 1947 due to financial reasons		
1948	(Italy) Giuseppe Farina	Maserati	Report
1949	Not held due to the death of Prince Louis II		
1950	(Argentina) Juan Manuel Fangio	Alfa Romeo	Report
1951	Not held due to budgetary concerns and a lack of regulations in Formula One		
1952	(Italy) Vittorio Marzotto	Ferrari	Report
1953 – 1954	Not held due to the fact that car regulations were not finalized in Formula One		
1955	(France) Maurice Trintignant	Ferrari	Report
1956	(United Kingdom) Stirling Moss	Maserati	Report
1957	(Argentina) Juan Manuel Fangio	Maserati	Report
1958	(France) Maurice Trintignant	Cooper-Climax	Report
1959	(Australia) Jack Brabham	Cooper-Climax	Report
1960	(United Kingdom) Stirling Moss	Lotus-Climax	Report
1961	(United Kingdom) Stirling Moss	Lotus-Climax	Report
1962	(New Zealand) Bruce McLaren	Cooper-Climax	Report
1963	(United Kingdom) Graham Hill	BRM	Report
1964	(United Kingdom) Graham Hill	BRM	Report
1965	(United Kingdom) Graham Hill	BRM	Report
1966	(United Kingdom) Jackie Stewart	BRM	Report
1967	(New Zealand) Denny Hulme	Brabham-Repco	Report
1968	(United Kingdom) Graham Hill	Lotus-Ford	Report
1969	(United Kingdom) Graham Hill	Lotus-Ford	Report
1970	(Austria) Jochen Rindt	Lotus-Ford	Report
1971	(United Kingdom) Jackie Stewart	Tyrrell-Ford	Report
1972	(France) Jean-Pierre Beltoise	BRM	Report
1973	(United Kingdom) Jackie Stewart	Tyrrell-Ford	Report
1974	(Sweden) Ronnie Peterson	Lotus-Ford	Report
1975	(Austria) Niki Lauda	Ferrari	Report
1976	(Austria) Niki Lauda	Ferrari	Report
1977	(South Africa) Jody Scheckter	Wolf-Ford	Report
1978	**(France)** Patrick Depailler	Tyrrell-Ford	Report
1979	(South Africa) Jody Scheckter	Ferrari	Report
1980	(Argentina) Carlos Reutemann	Williams-Ford	Report
1981	(Canada) Gilles Villeneuve	Ferrari	Report
1982	(Italy) Riccardo Patrese	Brabham-Ford	Report
1983	(Finland) Keke Rosberg	Williams-Ford	Report
1984	**(France)** Alain Prost	McLaren-TAG	Report
1985	**(France)** Alain Prost	McLaren-TAG	Report
1986	**(France)** Alain Prost	McLaren-TAG	Report
1987	(Brazil) Ayrton Senna	Lotus-Honda	Report
1988	**(France)** Alain Prost	McLaren-Honda	Report
1989	(Brazil) Ayrton Senna	McLaren-Honda	Report
1990	(Brazil) Ayrton Senna	McLaren-Honda	Report
1991	(Brazil) Ayrton Senna	McLaren-Honda	Report
1992	(Brazil) Ayrton Senna	McLaren-Honda	Report
1993	(Brazil) Ayrton Senna	McLaren-Ford	Report
1994	(Germany) Michael Schumacher	Benetton-Ford	Report
1995	(Germany) Michael Schumacher	Benetton-Renault	Report
1996	**(France)** Olivier Panis	Ligier-Mugen-Honda	Report
1997	(Germany) Michael Schumacher	Ferrari	Report
1998	(Finland) Mika Häkkinen	McLaren-Mercedes	Report
1999	(Germany) Michael Schumacher	Ferrari	Report
2000	(United Kingdom) David Coulthard	McLaren-Mercedes	Report
2001	(Germany) Michael Schumacher	Ferrari	Report
2002	(United Kingdom) David Coulthard	McLaren-Mercedes	Report
2003	(Colombia) Juan Pablo Montoya	Williams-BMW	Report
2004	(Italy) Jarno Trulli	Renault	Report
2005	(Finland) Kimi Räikkönen	McLaren-Mercedes	Report
2006	(Spain) Fernando Alonso	Renault	Report
2007	(Spain) Fernando Alonso	McLaren-Mercedes	Report
2008	(United Kingdom) Lewis Hamilton	McLaren-Mercedes	Report
2009	(United Kingdom) Jenson Button	Brawn-Mercedes	Report
2010	(Australia) Mark Webber	Red Bull-Renault	Report
2011	(Germany) Sebastian Vettel	Red Bull-Renault	Report
2012	(Australia) Mark Webber	Red Bull-Renault	Report
2013	(Germany) Nico Rosberg	Mercedes	Report
2014	(Germany) Nico Rosberg	Mercedes	Report
2015	(Germany) Nico Rosberg	Mercedes	Report
2016	(United Kingdom) Lewis Hamilton	Mercedes	Report
2017	(Germany) Sebastian Vettel	Ferrari	Report
2018	(Australia) Daniel Ricciardo	Red Bull Racing-TAG Heuer	Report
2019	(United Kingdom) Lewis Hamilton	Mercedes	Report
2020	Not held due to the COVID-19 pandemic		
2021	(Netherlands) Max Verstappen	Red Bull Racing-Honda	Report
2022	(Mexico) Sergio Pérez	Red Bull Racing-RBPT	Report
2023	(Netherlands) Max Verstappen	Red Bull Racing-Honda RBPT	Report
2024	(Monaco) Charles Leclerc	Ferrari	Report
2025	(United Kingdom) Lando Norris	McLaren-Mercedes	Report
2026	(Italy) Kimi Antonelli	Mercedes	Report

=== Repeat winners (drivers) ===
Drivers in bold are competing in the Formula One championship in 2026.

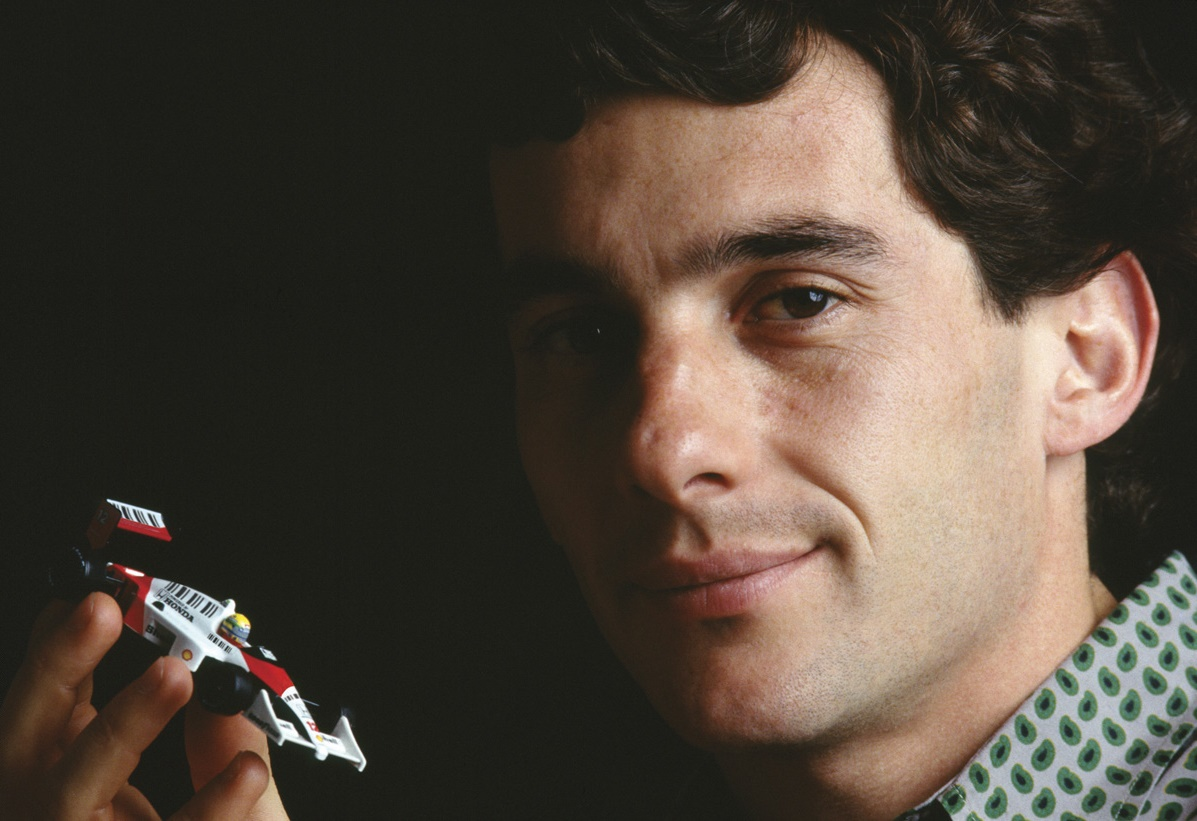
Ayrton Senna won the race a record six times.

Wins	Driver	Years won
6	(Brazil) Ayrton Senna	1987, 1989, 1990, 1991, 1992, 1993
5	(United Kingdom) Graham Hill	1963, 1964, 1965, 1968, 1969
5	(Germany) Michael Schumacher	1994, 1995, 1997, 1999, 2001
4	**(France)** Alain Prost	1984, 1985, 1986, 1988
3	(United Kingdom) Stirling Moss	1956, 1960, 1961
3	(United Kingdom) Jackie Stewart	1966, 1971, 1973
3	(Germany) Nico Rosberg	2013, 2014, 2015
3	(United Kingdom) **Lewis Hamilton**	2008, 2016, 2019
2	(Argentina) Juan Manuel Fangio	1950, 1957
2	(France) Maurice Trintignant	1955, 1958
2	(Austria) Niki Lauda	1975, 1976
2	(South Africa) Jody Scheckter	1977, 1979
2	(United Kingdom) David Coulthard	2000, 2002
2	(Spain) **Fernando Alonso**	2006, 2007
2	(Australia) Mark Webber	2010, 2012
2	(Germany) Sebastian Vettel	2011, 2017
2	(Netherlands) **Max Verstappen**	2021, 2023

=== Repeat winners (constructors) ===
Teams in bold are competing in the Formula One championship in 2026.
A pink background indicates an event which was not part of the Formula One World Championship.
A yellow background indicates an event which was part of the pre-war European Championship.

Wins	Constructor	Years won
16	(United Kingdom) **McLaren**	1984, 1985, 1986, 1988, 1989, 1990, 1991, 1992, 1993, 1998, 2000, 2002, 2005, 2007, 2008, 2025
11	(Italy) **Ferrari**	1952, 1955, 1975, 1976, 1979, 1981, 1997, 1999, 2001, 2017, 2024
9	(Germany) **Mercedes**	1935, 1936, 1937, 2013, 2014, 2015, 2016, 2019, 2026
7	(United Kingdom) Lotus	1960, 1961, 1968, 1969, 1970, 1974, 1987
7	(Austria) **Red Bull**	2010, 2011, 2012, 2018, 2021, 2022, 2023
5	(United Kingdom) BRM	1963, 1964, 1965, 1966, 1972
4	(France) Bugatti	1929, 1930, 1931, 1933
3	(Italy) Alfa Romeo	1932, 1934, 1950
3	(Italy) Maserati	1948, 1956, 1957
3	(United Kingdom) Cooper	1958, 1959, 1962
3	(United Kingdom) Tyrrell	1971, 1973, 1978
3	(United Kingdom) **Williams**	1980, 1983, 2003
2	(United Kingdom) Brabham	1967, 1982
2	(United Kingdom) Benetton	1994, 1995
2	**(France)** Renault	2004, 2006

=== Repeat winners (engine manufacturers) ===
Manufacturers in bold are competing in the Formula One championship in 2026.
A pink background indicates an event which was not part of the Formula One World Championship.
A yellow background indicates an event which was part of the pre-war European Championship.

Wins	Manufacturer	Years won
17	(Germany) **Mercedes** *	1935, 1936, 1937, 1998, 2000, 2002, 2005, 2007, 2008, 2009, 2013, 2014, 2015, 2016, 2019, 2025, 2026
13	(United States) Ford **	1968, 1969, 1970, 1971, 1973, 1974, 1977, 1978, 1980, 1982, 1983, 1993, 1994
11	(Italy) **Ferrari**	1952, 1955, 1975, 1976, 1979, 1981, 1997, 1999, 2001, 2017, 2024
7	(Japan) **Honda**	1987, 1988, 1989, 1990, 1991, 1992, 2021
6	**(France)** Renault	1995, 2004, 2006, 2010, 2011, 2012
5	(United Kingdom) Climax	1958, 1959, 1960, 1961, 1962
5	(United Kingdom) BRM	1963, 1964, 1965, 1966, 1972
4	(France) Bugatti	1929, 1930, 1931, 1933
3	(Italy) Alfa Romeo	1932, 1934, 1950
3	(Italy) Maserati	1948, 1956, 1957
3	(Luxembourg) TAG ***	1984, 1985, 1986

* Between 1998 and 2005 built by Ilmor, funded by Mercedes

** Built by Cosworth, funded by Ford

*** Built by Porsche

== Previous circuit configurations ==
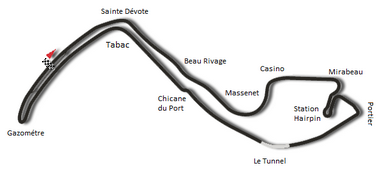
1929–1954

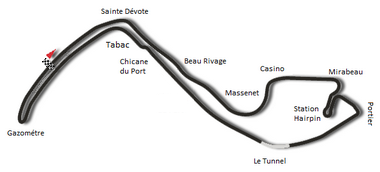
1955–1972

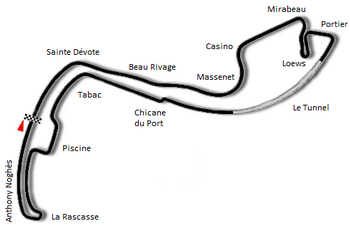
1973–1975

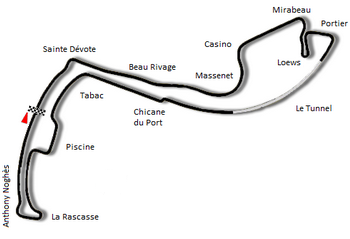
1976–1985

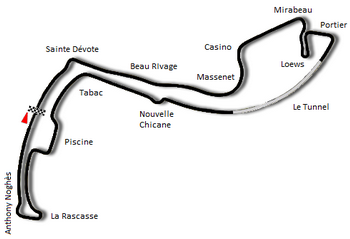
1986–1996

1997–2002

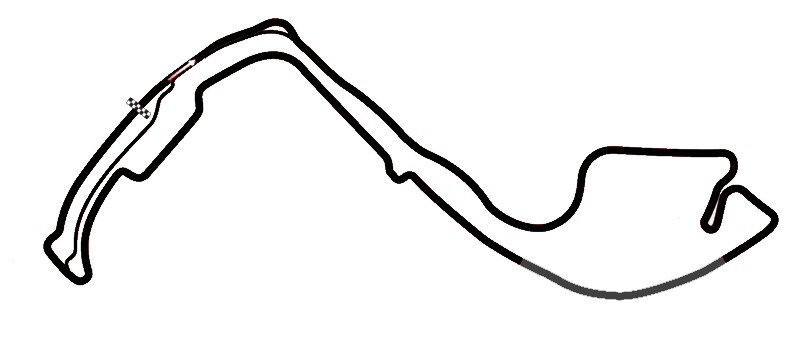
2003–2014

== See also ==
- Triple Crown
- Monaco Grand Prix support races

== Bibliography ==
- Codling, Stuart (2019). The Life Monaco Grand Prix. Beverly, MA: Motorbooks. ISBN 9780760363744.
- Folley, Malcolm (2017). Monaco: Inside F1's Greatest Race. London: Century. ISBN 9781780896168.
- Kettlewell, Mike. "Monaco: Road Racing on the Riviera", in Northey, Tom, editor. World of Automobiles, Volume 12, pp. 1381–4. London: Orbis, 1974.
