= 1929 Monaco Grand Prix =

Coordinates: 43°44′4.74″N 7°25′16.8″E

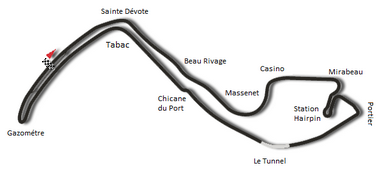

Race details
- Date: 14 April 1929
- Official name: Grand Prix Automobile de Monaco
- Location: Circuit de Monaco; Monte Carlo
- Course: Street circuit
- Course length: 3.180 km (1.976 miles)
- Distance: 100 laps, 318.0 km (197.6 miles)
- Weather: Dry

Pole position
Driver	(France) Philippe Étancelin	Bugatti
- Grid positions set by ballot

Fastest lap
Driver	(United Kingdom) William Grover-Williams	Bugatti
- Time: 2:15.0

Podium
First	(United Kingdom) William Grover-Williams	Bugatti
Second	(Romania) Georges Bouriano	Bugatti
Third	(Germany) Rudolf Caracciola	Mercedes-Benz

The 1929 Monaco Grand Prix event poster

The 1929 Monaco Grand Prix was the first Grand Prix to be run in the principality. It was set up by wealthy cigarette manufacturer Antony Noghès, who had set up the Automobile Club de Monaco with some of his friends. This offer of a Grand Prix was supported by Prince Louis II and the Monégasque driver of that time, Louis Chiron. On 14 April 1929, their plan became reality when 16 invited participants turned out to race for a prize of 100,000 French francs.

The event was won by William Grover-Williams (listed on timing sheets as W. Williams), who drove a Bugatti T35B.

== Race report ==
Twenty drivers were invited to participate in the contest, although only sixteen started the race due to incidents both on the way to the event and in practice. Local driver Louis Chiron also did not participate, choosing to compete in the 1929 Indianapolis 500 instead. Therefore, Rudolf Caracciola, a Mercedes-Benz factory driver, was the favourite to win the event.

The starting grid was determined by ballot, with Philippe Étancelin starting on pole position and Caracciola starting fifteenth. William Grover-Williams took the lead at the start of the 100-lap race, with Caracciola close behind him. Caracciola took the lead on lap 36, but Grover-Williams was able to take back his position six laps later. Both drivers made a pitstop midway through the race, but Caracciola's stop was much slower, allowing Grover-Williams to build a one lap lead. Georges Bouriano and Philippe de Rothschild (listed as Georges Philippe) also emerged between the pair, although Caracciola soon overtook the latter to finish third.

== Classification ==
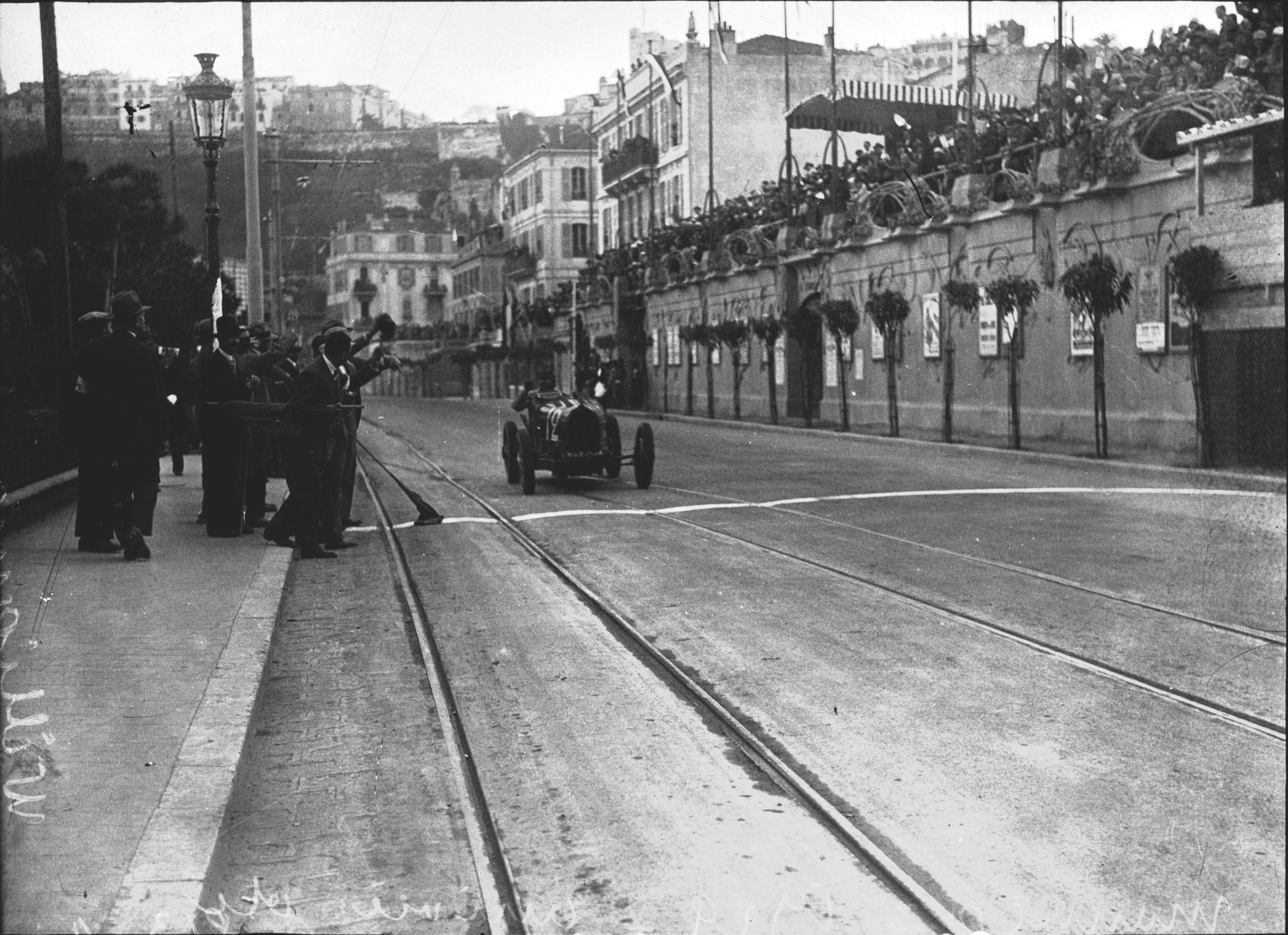
Winner William Grover-Williams crossing the finish line

=== Starting grid ===
Grid positions were determined by a ballot. Philippe Étancelin drew pole position.

	Inside	Middle	Outside
Row 1	(France); Étancelin; Bugatti	(France); Dauvergne; Bugatti	(France); Lehoux; Bugatti
Row 2	(Italy); Sandri; Maserati	(United Kingdom) "Williams"; Bugatti	(France); Philippe; Bugatti
Row 3	(Italy); Zehender; Alfa Romeo	(Romania); Bouriano; Bugatti	(France) de Rovin; Delage
Row 4	(France); Rigal; Alfa Romeo	(Italy) de Sterlich; Maserati	(France); Dreyfus; Bugatti
Row 5	(Switzerland); Lepori; Bugatti	(France); Doré; Corre La Licorne	(Germany); Caracciola; Mercedes-Benz
Row 6	(France); Perrot; Alfa Romeo	×	×

=== Race ===
Pos	No	Driver	Team	Laps	Time/Retired	Grid
1	12	(United Kingdom) "W Williams"	Bugatti T35B	100	3:56:11.0	5
2	18	(Romania) Georges Bouriano	Bugatti T35C	100	+1:17.8	8
3	34	(Germany) Rudolf Caracciola	Mercedes-Benz SSK	100	+2:22.6	15
4	14	(France) "Georges Philippe"	Bugatti T35C	99	+1 lap	6
5	28	(France) René Dreyfus	Bugatti T37A	97	+3 laps	12
6	4	(France) Philippe Étancelin	Bugatti T35C	96	+4 laps	1
7	30	(Switzerland) Mario Lepori	Bugatti T35C	94	+6 laps	13
8	32	(France) Michel Doré	Corre La Licorne	89	+11 laps	14
9	24	(France) Louis Rigal	Alfa Romeo 6C	87	+13 laps	10
Ret	22	(France) Raoul de Rovin	Delage 15S8	80	Accident	9
Ret	16	(Italy) Goffredo Zehender	Alfa Romeo 6C	55	Mechanical	7
Ret	6	(France) Christian Dauvergne	Bugatti T35C	46	Mechanical	2
Ret	10	(Italy) Guglielmo Sandri	Maserati T26	41	Mechanical	4
Ret	36	(France) Albert Perrot	Alfa Romeo 6C	18	Wheel detached	16
Ret	26	(Italy) Diego de Sterlich	Maserati T26B	16	Mechanical	11
Ret	8	(France) Marcel Lehoux	Bugatti T35C	7	Transmission	3

Grand Prix Race
1929 Grand Prix season
Previous race: None	Monaco Grand Prix	Next race: 1930 Monaco Grand Prix
