= Georges Bouriano =

Romanian racing driver (1901–1996)

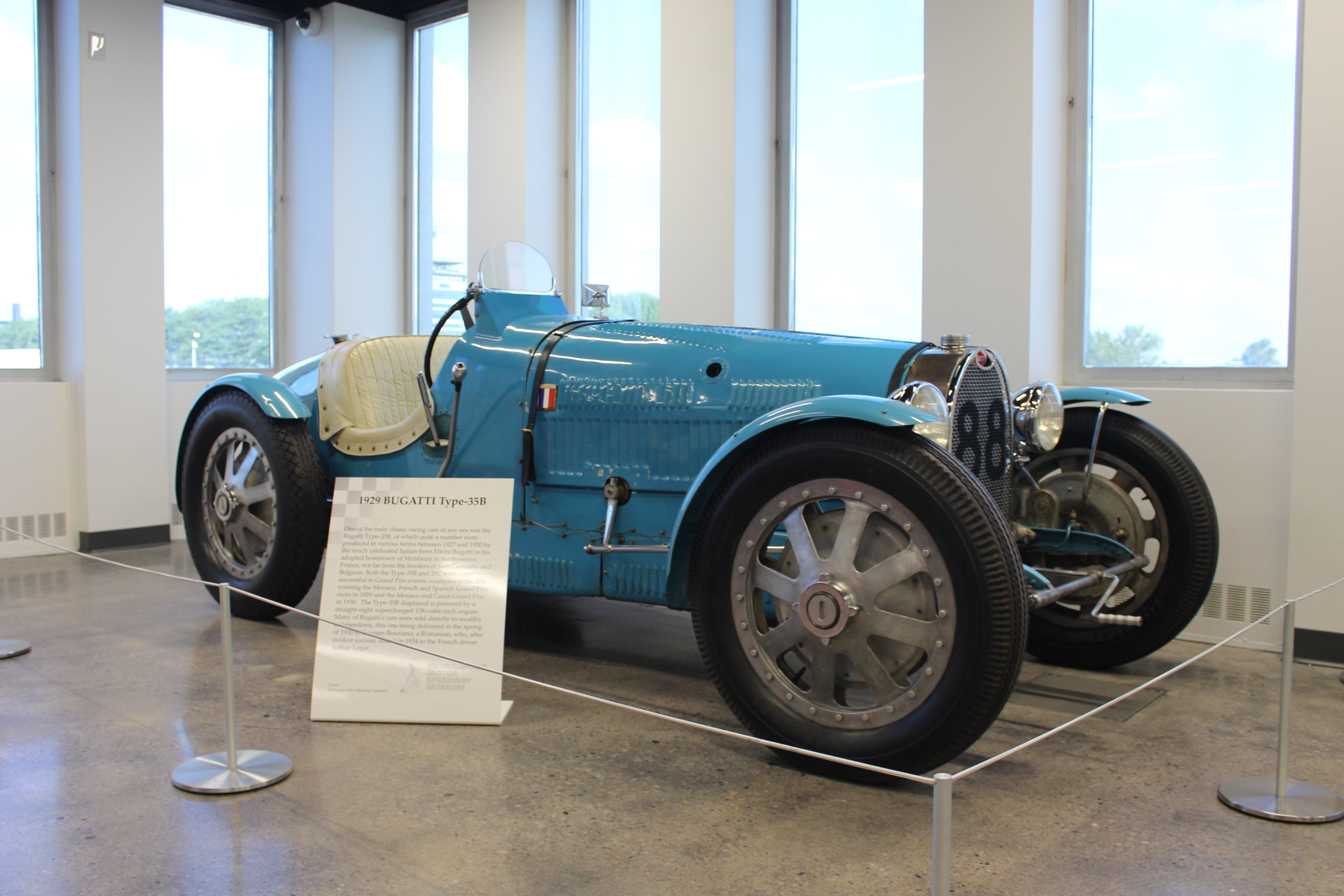
Bugatti T35C in Indianapolis Motor Speedway Museum

Georges Bouriano/George Burianu was a Romanian racing car driver (20 August 1901, Brăila – 1996, Waterloo) who raced in the Bugatti T35C. He came second in the 1929 Monaco Grand Prix. He was the last living participant in the race.
