= William Grover-Williams =

British racing driver (1903–1945)

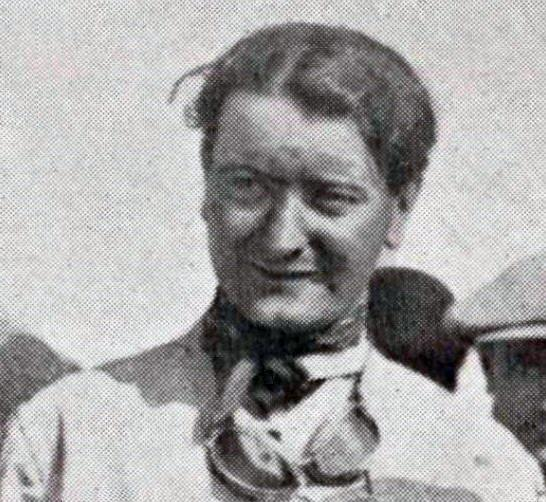
- Grover-Williams in 1928
- Born: 16 January 1903; Montrouge, Hauts-de-Seine, France
- Died: 18 March 1945 (or shortly thereafter) (aged 42); Sachsenhausen concentration camp, Nazi Germany
- Occupations: Racing driver SOE agent
- Spouse: Yvonne Aupicq (m. 1929–1945)
- Parent(s): Frederick Grover (Engl); Hermance Dagan (Fr)

William Charles Frederick Grover-Williams (born William Charles Frederick Grover, 16 January 1903 – 18 March 1945 (or shortly thereafter)), also known as "W Williams", was a British Grand Prix motor racing driver. He is best known for winning the first Monaco Grand Prix.

During World War II, Grover-Williams, code named Sebastian, worked as an agent in France for the clandestine British Special Operations Executive (SOE) organization. SOE's objectives were to conduct espionage, sabotage, and reconnaissance in countries occupied by the Axis powers, especially those occupied by Nazi Germany. SOE agents allied themselves with French resistance groups and supplied them with weapons and equipment. Grover-Williams created, coordinated, and led the SOE's Chestnut network which worked near Paris. The Chestnut network organised parachute drops of weapons and equipment from SOE and stockpiled them for the use of the resistance. The German Sicherheitsdienst (SD) captured Grover-Williams in August 1943. He was imprisoned and executed in March 1945.

== Personal and early life ==
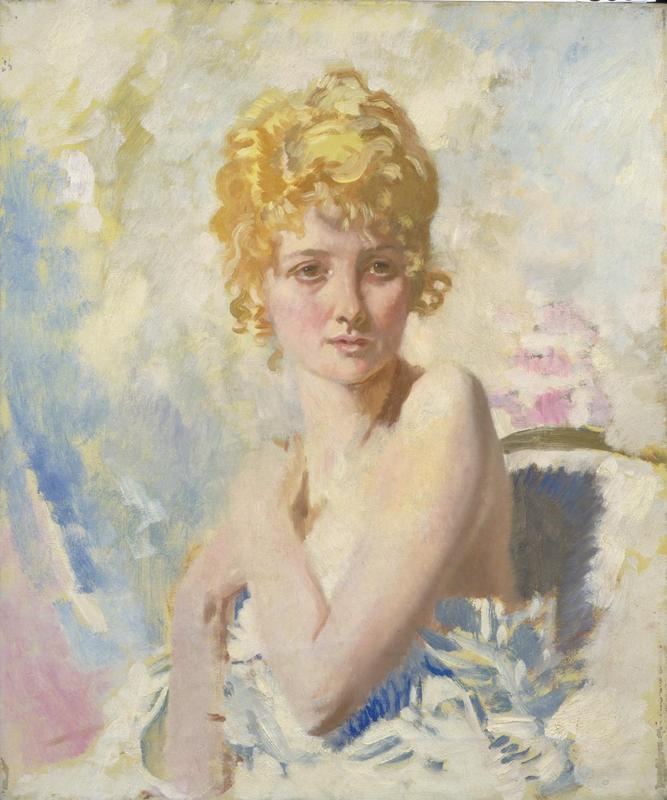
Grover-Williams's wife Yvonne Aupicq in 1917, a model for William Orpen.

Grover-Williams was born in Montrouge, Hauts-de-Seine, France on 16 January 1903 to Frederick and Hermance Grover. Frederick Grover was an English horse breeder who had settled in Montrouge. Frederick met a French woman, Hermance Dagan, and they were soon married. Their first child was Elizabeth, born in 1897. William had two other siblings – Alice and Frédéric. Born to an English father and a French mother, Grover-Williams grew up fluent in both French and English.

When William was eleven, during World War I, his parents sent him to live with relatives in Hertfordshire, in the United Kingdom. After the war, Frederick Grover moved the family to Monte Carlo. It was there that William developed a fascination for automobiles, having been taught to drive a Rolls-Royce by his sister's boyfriend. Grover-Williams passed his driving test while in Monaco and was granted a licence. Mechanically inclined and fascinated by motorised vehicles, at the age of 15 Grover-Williams acquired an Indian motorcycle and it became his pride and joy. He would later compete in motorcycle races in the early 1920s, although he kept it secret from his family by adopting the pseudonym, "W Williams".

In 1919, the Irish portrait painter, William Orpen became the official artist of the Paris Peace Conference. Orpen bought a Rolls-Royce car and hired Grover-Williams, who had returned to Paris, as his chauffeur. At the time, Orpen had a mistress and model named Yvonne Aupicq. Aupicq and Grover-Williams became good friends and, after the collapse of Aupicq's relationship with Orpen, the pair married in November 1929. She was six years older than him.

== Racing career ==
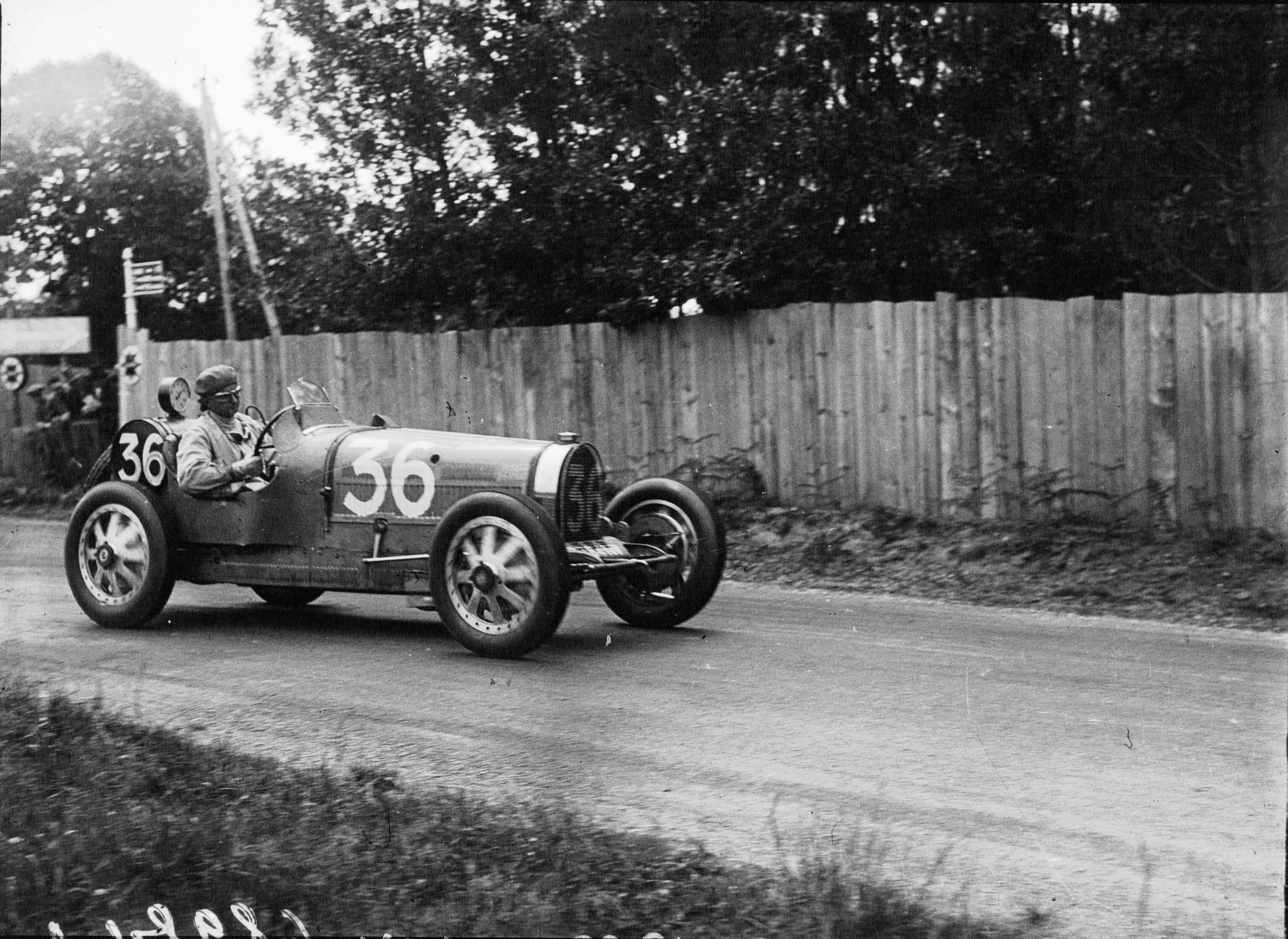
William Grover-Williams in 1929 Le Mans, Grand Prix A.C.F. driving Bugatti Type 35

By 1926, Grover-Williams had begun racing a Bugatti in races throughout France, using the alias, "W Williams", entering the Grand Prix de Provence at Miramas and the Monte Carlo Rally. In 1928, he won the French Grand Prix, repeating in 1929. That same year, driving a Bugatti 35B, painted in what would become known as "British racing green", he won the inaugural Monaco Grand Prix beating the heavily favoured Mercedes of the German driver, Rudolf Caracciola.

Successful financially, Grover-Williams and his wife maintained a home in a fashionable district of Paris while owning a large house in the resort town of La Baule, Pays de la Loire, on the Bay of Biscay, which was home to one of the annual Grand Prix races. In 1931, he won the Belgian Grand Prix at Spa-Francorchamps. He also won the Grand Prix de la Baule in three consecutive years (1931 to 1933). He retired from racing in 1933.

== Second World War ==
On 28 February 1940, Grover-Williams enlisted in the British Royal Army Service Corps and worked as a driver in France. In June 1940, he was evacuated from Dunkirk to England after the victory by Nazi Germany in the Battle of France. Due to his fluency in both French and English, he was recruited into the Special Operations Executive (SOE) in autumn 1940. SOE trained him to be an agent and promoted him from private to second lieutenant. On 29 May 1942, Grover-Williams and another SOE agent, Christopher Burney, parachuted "blind" (with no reception committee on the ground) into France near Le Mans. Grover-Williams proceeded to Paris where he reunited with his wife, Yvonne, but, for security reasons, he found himself a different place to live and work. Grover-Williams's work name with SOE was "Sebastian". His task for SOE was to create a "sleeper" cell called Chestnut which would prepare to take action against the German occupiers when ordered to do so by SOE.

SOE's network in Paris was Autogyro, headed by Pierre de Vomécourt, but in April 1942 the Germans were destroying Autogyro and killing or imprisoning its members. SOE envisioned Chestnut as a replacement for Autogyro, but with the creation of the Prosper network later in 1942, the much smaller Chestnut network became a secondary network in Paris, devoting itself to storing arms for the eventual use of the French resistance against the German occupiers. Grover-Williams recruited two fellow race-car drivers, Robert Benoist and Jean-Pierre Wimille, into his network and the trio used their wives and other women as couriers. The base of their operations was the Benoist family estate near Auffargis about 25 miles (40 km) southwest of Paris.

Grover-Williams's main problem was that SOE did not supply him with a radio operator for communications with SOE headquarters in London. This problem was partially solved in January 1943 when Grover-Williams established contact with Jack Agazarian, the newly arrived radio operator for the Prosper Network. SOE policy dictated that each network should have its own radio operator and that contact between and among networks was forbidden. Contrary to that policy, Agazarian transmitted Chestnut's messages to London. Starting in mid-February, Grover-Williams organized with SOE six parachute drops of weapons and other supplies for the French resistance. In March 1943, SOE finally sent Grover-Williams a radio operator of his own, Roland Dowlen. The arms and other supplies the Chestnut network had received were stored for future use. Grover-Williams was also able to organize an effective sabotage effort at the Citroën factory in Paris.

Grover-Williams's downfall began 31 July 1943 when a German direction-finding van pinpointed the location of Dowlen and his radio and arrested him. On 1 August, Maurice Benoist, brother of Robert, was arrested. The next day Maurice Benoist led the German Sicherheitsdienst (SD) to the Benoist chateau at Auffargis. Grover-Williams was found hiding in a stable and arrested. The Germans recovered many containers of arms and equipment at the chateau. The Germans captured Robert Benoist on 4 August but he escaped, although he was later recaptured and executed. Jean-Pierre Wimille, the third of the race-car drivers who were SOE agents, survived the war. When Grover-Williams's wife, Yvonne, learned of his arrest, she fled Paris and took refuge with friends in the village of Thorenc.

== Imprisonment and death ==
After his capture, the Germans took Grover-Williams to SD headquarters at 84 Avenue Foch in Paris for interrogation. In January 1944, he was sent to Berlin and imprisoned at the Reich Security Office, notorious for the tortures committed on prisoners. In March 1944 he was transferred to the Sachsenhausen concentration camp. In March 1945, the Nazi government decreed "special treatment" for a list of political prisoners, including Grover-Williams.

Grover-Williams was executed at Sachsenhausen in the spring of 1945, along with fellow SOE network leader Francis Suttill. The date of death shown on the official War Office casualty lists, originally "On or shortly after 1.2.1945" has been amended to read "On or shortly after 18.3.1945", while the Commonwealth War Graves Commission records the date simply as 18 March 1945.

After the war, Grover-Williams's widow, Yvonne, eventually settled in the village of Amfreville-la-Campagne in Normandy where she managed a dog kennel breeding terriers. She died in 1973, age 77. Robert Benoist's granddaughter, among others, claimed that William Grover-Williams survived the war and lived with Yvonne from 1948 until her death under the assumed identity of "Georges Tambal." Tambal was killed by a German driver while riding a bicycle in 1983.

== Legacy and recognition ==
Grover-Williams is recorded on the Brookwood Memorial in Surrey, England, and as one of the SOE agents who died for the liberation of France, he is listed on the Valençay SOE Memorial's Roll of Honour in the French town of Valençay.

Awarded the French Croix de Guerre, Grover-Williams was also recommended for an Order of the British Empire by the head of the SOE, Major-General Colin Gubbins, in September 1945, but when it became clear that he had died the honour was not awarded.

The Saboteur, a 2009 video game, features an Irish protagonist named Sean Devlin who is inspired by Grover-Williams.

A statue of Grover-Williams in his 1929 Monaco Grand Prix-winning Bugatti Type 35 is located at the first corner of the Circuit de Monaco (Sainte-Dévote Chapel).

== Results and records ==
=== Grand Prix wins ===
Year	Grand Prix	Location	Car	Report
1928	(France) French Grand Prix	Saint-Gaudens	Bugatti Type 35	Report
1929	Monaco Grand Prix	Monte Carlo	Bugatti Type 35	Report
1929	(France) French Grand Prix	Le Mans	Bugatti Type 35	Report
1931	(Belgium) Belgian Grand Prix †	Spa-Francorchamps	Bugatti Type 51	Report
1931	(France) Grand Prix de la Baule	La Baule	Bugatti Type 51	Report
1932	(France) Grand Prix de la Baule	La Baule	Bugatti Type 51	Report
1933	(France) Grand Prix de la Baule	La Baule	Bugatti Type 54	Report
† Grover-Williams shared a car with Caberto Conelli.

=== Complete European Championship results ===
(key) (Races in bold indicate pole position)

Year	Entrant	Make	1	2	3	4	Pos.	Points
1931	Usines Bugatti	Bugatti	ITA	FRA; Ret †	BEL; 1 †		9=	14
1932	Private entry	Bugatti	ITA	FRA; 6	GER		9=	20
1936	Bugatti	Bugatti	MON; 9	GER	SUI	ITA	18=	28
† Grover-Williams shared a car with Caberto Conelli.
