= Stelzer =

Stelzer is a surname. Notable people with the surname include:

- Adolf Stelzer (1908–1977), Swiss footballer
- Andrea Stelzer (born c. 1965), South African beauty queen
- Hannes Stelzer (1910–1944), Austrian film actor
- Howard Stelzer (born 1974), American classical composer
- Irwin Stelzer (born 1932), American economist
- Michael Stelzer (born 1964), American judge
- Simone Stelzer (born 1969), Austrian pop singer
- Thomas Stelzer (diplomat), Austrian diplomat
- Thomas Stelzer (politician), Austrian politician

See also

- Stelzer engine, is a two-stroke opposing-piston free-piston engine design proposed by Frank Stelzer
