= ABC Auto Sales and Investment Company Building =

Historic car dealership in Missouri, US

- U.S. National Register of Historic Places
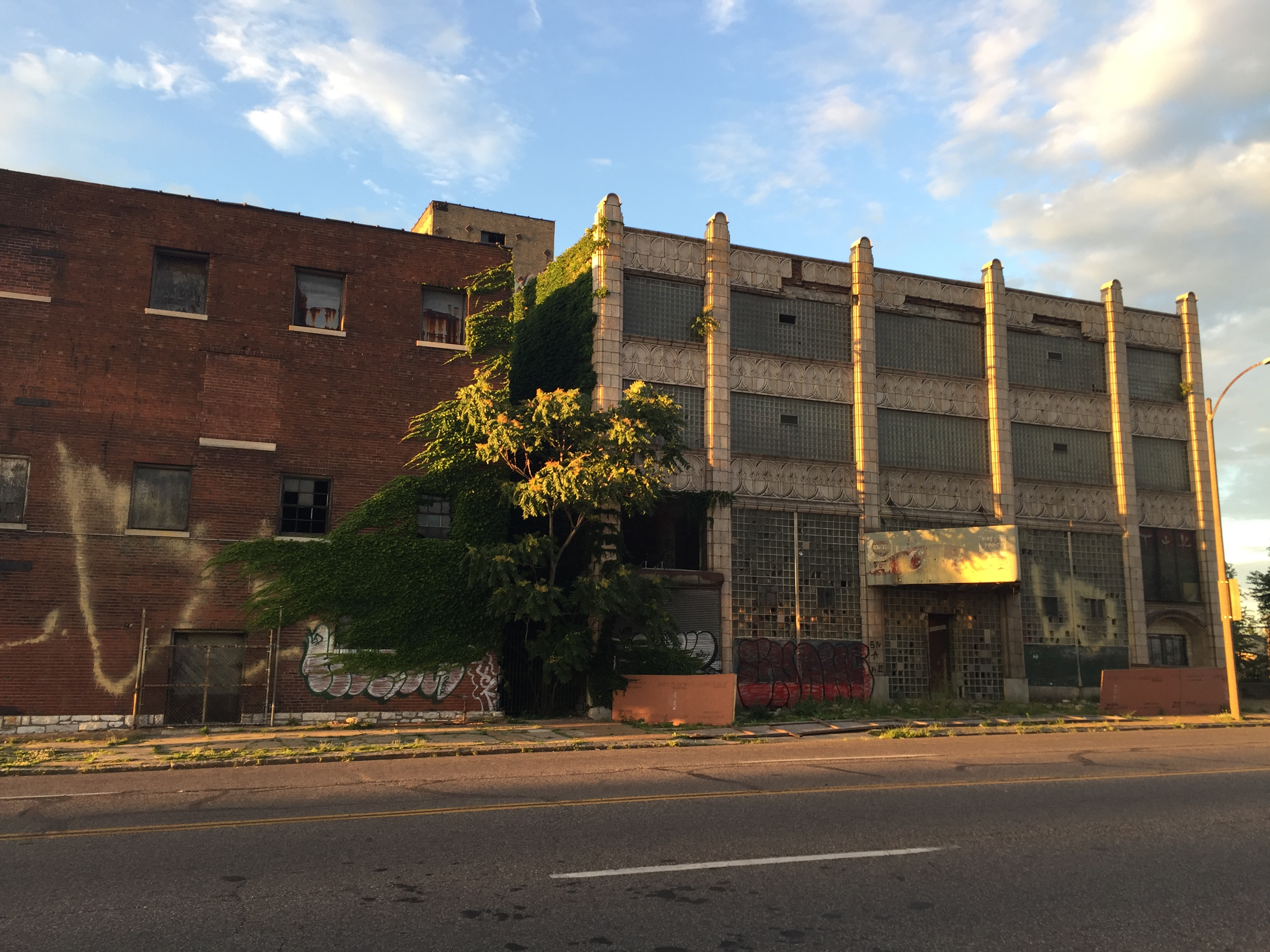
- The building's exterior in 2017

- Location within Missouri Location within the United States
- Location: 3509-27 Page Blvd., St. Louis, Missouri
- Coordinates: 38°38′45″N 90°13′35″W
- Area: 0.4 acres (0.16 ha)
- Built: 1927
- Architect: David R. Harrison; Harrison & Kopman Construction Co.
- Architectural style: Art Deco
- MPS: Auto-Related Resources of St. Louis, Missouri MPS
- NRHP reference No.: 12000925
- Added to NRHP: November 12, 2012

The ABC Auto Sales and Investment Company Building, at 3509–27 Page Blvd, is a historic car dealership in Grand Center Arts District, St. Louis, Missouri. Built in 1927, it was listed on the National Register of Historic Places in 2012.

== History ==
Standing in a 1,500-acre (6.1 km^{2}) property, the building is four stories tall, and is walled with red brick and white terracotta cladding. It was designed by architect David R. Harrison and built by the Harrison & Kopman Construction Company. Its construction was planned to cost $30,000, though costed $150,000 by the time of its completion.

The building was used as a car dealership until 1935, for the Hudson Motor Car Company's Essex auto line, featuring a garage bay, an open floor plan, and a freight elevator. The building was later used by a moving and storage company into the 1960s. It laid vacant from at least 1989, through the 2010s. it was acquired by developer Paul McKee in 2009. In 2013, of renovation was planned for the building, as part of a $390 million south St. Louis revitilization project. It would have been handled by Civitas, a renovation company. Though, the $6 million permit to renovate the building expired in 2012.

In 2022, the people of the Grand Center Arts District sued McKee for having the building in poor conditions. Judge Michael Stelzer ruled against McKee on December 28, 2023, and ordered him to fund its renovation. Despite the order, by July 2024, McKee had not filed for a permit to renovate it. The property was given to the community on May 28, 2025, and the court order was dropped on May 29.
