= DiesOtto =

The DiesOtto motor is an experimental automobile engine that "is said to incorporate the benefits of a diesel engine, but runs on gasoline instead."

Its name is a portmanteau of Diesel and Otto, referring to the Diesel engine, first introduced by German engineer Rudolf Diesel, and the Otto cycle, as a reference to Nicolaus Otto (even though the invention of the gasoline engine is variously attributed to both Nicolaus Otto and Alphonse Beau de Rochas).

As of 2017, the only company which announced to launch a car with a DiesOtto motor is Mazda, with SKYACTIV-X.

== Engine characteristics and principles of operation ==
The concept engine has an in-line, four-cylinder configuration and displaces 1.8 litres. Its peak power is no less than 175 kW (235 hp), making its specific output 97 kW/L (130 hp/L), and its peak torque is 400 N·m, making its specific torque 220 N·m/L. Mercedes-Benz do not specify the RPM at which these specified maxima are reached.

The DiesOtto features the following:

- homogeneous charge compression ignition (HCCI);
- variable valve timing;
- twin variable geometry turbocharging;
- variable compression ratio;
- direct fuel injection.

It also uses a starter-alternator to reduce fuel consumption. The starter-alternator replaces the engine's flywheel, and allows the engine to be started instantaneously so that it can simply stop when not needed, such as at traffic lights, and smoothly restart when needed.

In low-demand conditions (low to medium engine speeds), the engine uses HCCI. In high-demand conditions, it operates like a regular gasoline engine (using spark ignition of the fuel/air mixture) and uses the full benefits of direct fuel injection, turbocharging and variable valve timing to maximize efficiency. These two modes of operation require different compression ratios, achieved via a concept similar to that of the Lanchester shaft, which is why the engine also features a variable compression ratio.

It is reported to consume less than 6 L/100 km (47 mpg_{‑imp}; 39 mpg_{‑US}) when fitted to the S-Class demonstration vehicle. However, it is unknown in what conditions this mileage is achieved.

=== Testing and demonstration ===
The testing and demonstration vehicles include a long-wheel based Mercedes-Benz S-Class fitted with a 19 bhp (14 kW) electric motor to hide the transition from spark to compression power, and the engine has been installed in the Mercedes-Benz F700 concept car shown at the 2007 Frankfurt Motor Show.
