= Rolf Reitz =

American mechanical engineer

Rolf D. Reitz
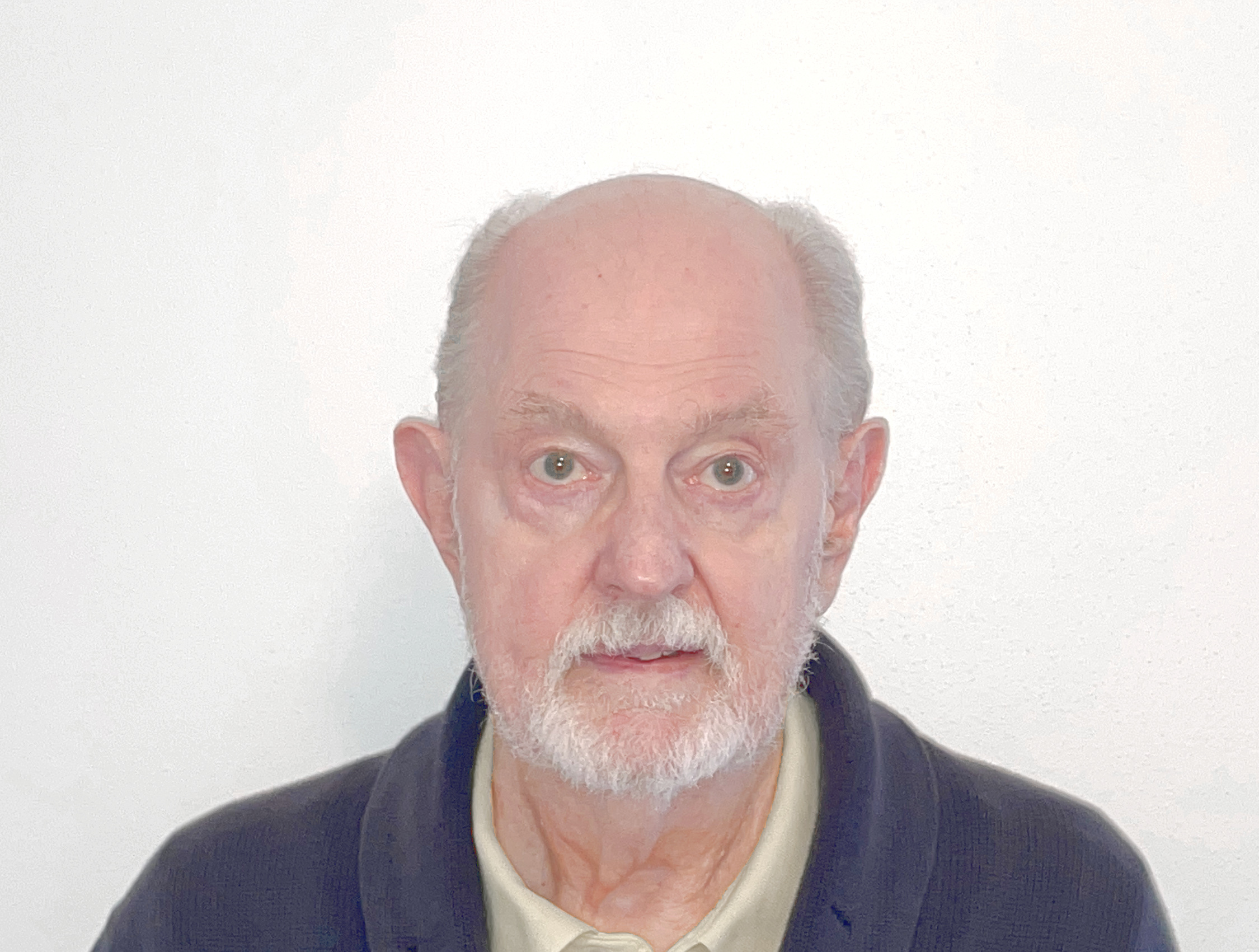
- Occupations: Mechanical engineer, academic, and author

Academic background
- Education: B.Sc., Mechanical Engineering; M.Sc., Mechanical Engineering; M.S., Mechanics; M.A., Mechanical and Aerospace Engineering; Ph.D., Mechanical and Aerospace Engineering
- Alma mater: University of Cape Town; State University of New York at Stony Brook; Princeton University
- Thesis: Atomization and Other Breakup Regimes of a Liquid Jet (1978)

Academic work
- Institutions: University of Wisconsin–Madison (UW)

Rolf D. Reitz is an American mechanical engineer, academic, and author whose research focuses on internal combustion engines, chemical kinetics, and sprays. He is an Emeritus Professor at the University of Wisconsin–Madison (UW).

Reitz's group works on developing and using advanced computer models to design fuel-injected engines, including both diesel and spark-ignition engines. His team has also led the development of a dual-fuel engine technology, reactivity controlled compression ignition (RCCI).

Reitz is a co-founder and Partner at Wisconsin Engine Research Consultants (WERC) and a member of the CO_{2} Coalition. He is a Member of the Combustion Institute and a Fellow of the Society of Automotive Engineers (SAE) and the American Society of Mechanical Engineers (ASME). Additionally, he co-founded the International Journal of Engine Research and served as Co-Editor for two decades.

Reitz's contributions to the field have earned him several awards, including the 2004 Soichiro Honda Medal, the 2011 ASME Internal Combustion Engine Award, the 2012 DOE Vehicle Technologies R&D Award "in recognition of innovative combustion strategies leading to significant improvements in engine efficiency," the 2016 SAE John H. Johnson Award for "outstanding leadership in research in diesel engines," and the 2016 Aurel Stodola Medal, with the citation: "His research foundations have led to cleaner, more efficient engines."

== Education and early career ==
Reitz received a B.Sc. in mechanical engineering in 1970 and an M.Sc. in mechanical engineering in 1972 from the University of Cape Town. He then completed an M.S. in mechanics at the State University of New York at Stony Brook in 1973, followed by serving as a research assistant at Princeton University from 1974 to 1978, where he earned an M.A. in 1975 and a Ph.D. in Mechanical and aerospace engineering in 1978. He joined New York University as an Associate Research Scientist at the Courant Institute of Mathematical Sciences from 1978 to 1980, before being appointed as a Research Staff Member at Princeton University, where he worked from 1980 to 1983. He then served as a Senior Research Engineer at General Motors Research Laboratories from 1983 to 1985, followed by a role as Staff Research Engineer from 1985 to 1989.

== Career ==
Reitz is the past Chairman of the Institute for Liquid Atomization and Spray Systems (ILASS-Americas), being a member of the board of directors for Reaction Design from 2006 to 2015, and co-founding Engine Simulation Partners, where he was active from 2008 to 2015.

Reitz held several positions at the University of Wisconsin-Madison, starting as an associate professor of mechanical engineering from 1989 to 1993, then as a Professor from 1993 to 1999. He served as Wisconsin Distinguished Professor from 1999 to 2015, Founding Director of the Direct Injection Engine Research Consortium (DERC) from 2004 to 2015, and Director of the Engine Research Center during two terms, from 2001 to 2004 and 2012 to 2015. Since 2015, he has been emeritus professor of mechanical engineering.

== Research ==
Among Reitz's authored works are articles published in academic journals such as Combustion science and technology, and SAE Transactions, as well as books including Modelling Diesel Combustion. His Google Scholar h-index is 123, with a D-index of 111, and national ranking of 16th and a global ranking of 26th among mechanical and aerospace engineering scientists.

Reitz's use of genetic algorithms for engine design optimization has been highlighted in the media, with features in Business Week, The London Times, CNN, and The New York Times. He has applied computational fluid dynamics (CFD) to study engine emissions and fuel efficiency, focusing on fuel atomization. In his early research, he emphasized the significance of breakup mechanisms and drop size distribution in fuel vaporization and mixing efficiency, while also developing a model to predict core length, drop size, and spray behavior—key factors critical for engine performance. Additionally, he advanced atomization models for diesel and gasoline sprays with the KH-RT hybrid model, enhancing predictions of spray characteristics and the temperature dependence of fuel penetration.

Reitz applied turbulence modeling, including the RNG κ-ε model, to analyze combustion parameters and soot emissions in variable-density engine flows. His work on high-efficiency, clean combustion highlighted reactivity-controlled compression ignition (RCCI) as a means to improve fuel efficiency in diesel and CI engines. Furthermore, by refining the spray model, he improved combustion and emission predictions in diesel engines, accurately modeling fuel spray characteristics like droplet size and vaporization. His study on multiple injections showed that high-pressure injections reduced soot and NOx emissions, with split injection minimizing soot without increasing NOx. He also found that oxygenated fuels significantly reduce soot emissions at high loads in a Caterpillar SCOTE DI diesel engine, with split injections enhancing this effect, while their impact is minimal at low loads. In related research, he developed a temperature wall function for variable-density turbulent flows, demonstrating the impact of gas compressibility on heat transfer predictions, with strong agreement between predicted and measured heat fluxes.

=== Patents ===
Reitz holds 6 patents through WARF (Wisconsin Alumni Research Foundation) for methods aimed at reducing emissions and improving engine performance. These include techniques for reducing diesel engine emissions through multiple fuel injections at varying pressures, as well as methods for reducing NOx and soot emissions by adjusting fuel injection timing, pressure, and volume. He also patented methods for engine combustion control using fuel reactivity stratification to enhance power output while minimizing noise, and for improving ignition control in diesel engines through valve manipulation during compression or power strokes.

== Awards and honors ==
- 2004 – Soichiro Honda Medal, ASME
- 2009 – Marshall Award, Institute for Liquid Atomization and Spray Systems
- 1997, 2010, 2012, 2013 – Harry L. Horning Memorial Award, SAE International
- 2011 – Internal Combustion Engine Award, ASME
- 2012 – Vehicle Technologies R&D Program Award, United States Department of Energy
- 2014, 2015, 2016 – John H. Johnson Award, SAE International
- 2014, 2015 – Myers Award for Outstanding Student Paper, SAE International
- 2016 – Aurel Stodola Medal Laureate, Eidgenössische Technische Hochschule Zürich
- 2018 – Lefebvre Award, Institute for Liquid Atomization and Spray Systems

== Bibliography ==
=== Books ===
- Modelling Diesel Combustion (2010) ISBN 9789048138852
- Computational Optimization of Internal Combustion Engines (2011) ISBN 9780857296191
- The Application of an Explicit Numerical Method to a Reaction-Diffusion System in Combustion (2018) ISBN 9780656022076

=== Selected articles ===
- Reitz, R. D., & Bracco, F. V. (1982). Mechanism of atomization of a liquid jet. The Physics of Fluids, 25(10), 1730–1742.
- Reitz, R. (1987). Modeling atomization processes in high-pressure vaporizing sprays. Atomisation and Spray Technology, 3(4), 309–337.
- Han, Z., & Reitz, R. D. (1995). Turbulence modeling of internal combustion engines using RNG κ-ε models. Combustion science and technology, 106(4–6), 267–295.
- Beale, J. C., & Reitz, R. D. (1999). Modeling spray atomization with the Kelvin-Helmholtz/Rayleigh-Taylor hybrid model. Atomization and sprays, 9(6).
- Kokjohn, S. L., Hanson, R. M., Splitter, D. A., & Reitz, R. D. (2011). Fuel reactivity controlled compression ignition (RCCI): a pathway to controlled high-efficiency clean combustion. International Journal of Engine Research, 12(3), 209–226.
- Reitz, R. D., & Duraisamy, G. (2015). Review of high efficiency and clean reactivity controlled compression ignition (RCCI) combustion in internal combustion engines. Progress in Energy and Combustion Science, 46, 12–71.
