= Raúl Pateras Pescara =

Argentinian engineer, lawyer and inventor

Marquis Raúl Pateras Pescara de Castelluccio
- Born: 1890; Buenos Aires, Argentina
- Died: 1966 (aged 75–76); Paris, France
- Engineering career
- Discipline: Engineering
- Projects: Pescara helicopters, Nacional Pescara automobile, Pescara auto-compressors, free-piston engines
- Significant design: Coaxial helicopters, free-piston engines
- Significant advance: Early use of cyclic pitch and autorotation in helicopters

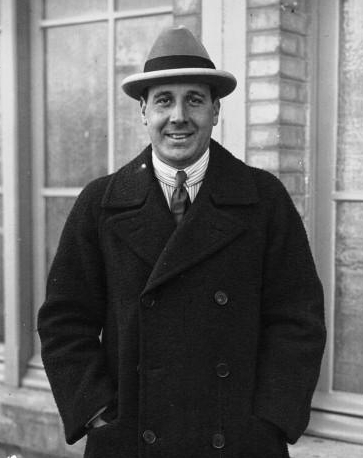
Raúl Pateras Pescara, 1922

Raúl Pateras Pescara de Castelluccio (1890 – 1966), marquis of Pateras-Pescara, was an engineer, lawyer and inventor from Argentina who specialized in automobiles, helicopters and free-piston engines.

Pescara is credited for being one of the first people to successfully utilize cyclic pitch, as well as pioneering the use of autorotation for the safe landing of a damaged helicopter. Pescara also set a world record (at the time) in 1924 for achieving a speed of 13 km/h (8 mph) in a helicopter.

== Biography ==
Silent film of a test flight of Pescara's helicopter on the aerodrome of Issy-les-Moulineaux near Paris, 1922. EYE Film Institute Netherlands.

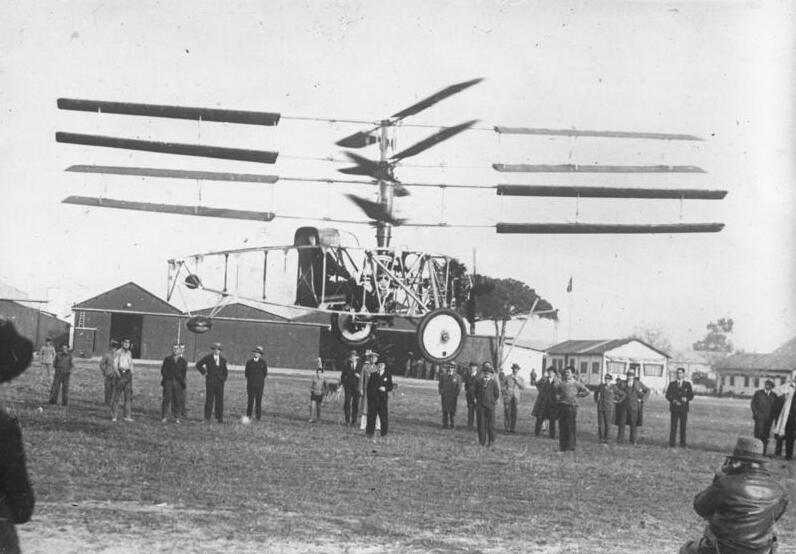
Pescara helicopter 4S (1931)

Pescara was born in Buenos Aires and at the beginning of the 20th century, his family left Argentina to return to Europe.

=== Aircraft ===
In 1911, using a workshop that Pescara was involved with, Gustave Eiffel tested a scale model (1:20) of a seaplane (monoplane design) named the Pateras Pescara, designed by Pescara and Italian engineer Alessandro Guidoni, in a wind tunnel. In 1912, the Italian Ministry of the Navy commissioned Guidoni to build a torpedo bomber based on the Pescara model; but following tests in 1914, Guidoni was unable to create a successful design.

From 1919, Pescara built several coaxial helicopters and submitted numerous patents across several countries. He first tested his machine indoors in 1921, before moving to Paris, France, where government funding was available. His "No. 3" design had two contra-rotating "screws", with each screw having four blades, and each blade a biplane wing with wing warping for control.

On January 16, 1924, at Issy-les-Moulineaux near Paris, Pescara broke his own world record for helicopter flight with his model 2F, The Marquis Pateras, by remaining in the air 8 minutes and 13 4/5 seconds, whilst flying 1,160 metres (3,810 ft; 0.72 mi) in a vertical line." On January 29, 1924, whilst attempting to win the French Aero Club prize for a 1-kilometre (0.62 mi) closed circuit, Pescara completed the course in 10 minutes, 33 seconds, but was not permitted to qualify due to his machine's brief contact with the ground. Equipped with coaxial double rotor apparatus, the engineer then set the first helicopter record recognized by the Fédération Aéronautique Internationale (FAI); On April 18, 1924, he flew a distance of 736 metres (2,415 ft), with a duration of 4 minutes, 11 seconds (approximately 13 km/h (8.1 mph)) and a height of 1.8 m (5 ft 11 in).

=== Automobiles ===
In 1929, together with his brother Henri, the Italian engineer Edmond Moglia and the Spanish government, Pescara founded La Fábrica Nacional de Automóviles ("National Automobile Factory") with an investment of 70 million pesetas. Pescara utilized the new factory to focus upon automobiles, and in 1931 he exhibited his creation, the Nacional Pescara, at the 1931 Paris Motor Show. The vehicle appeared at the Grand Palais next to Voisin's and in 1931, the eight-cylinder car won the European Grand Prix for hillclimbing.

=== Air compressors ===
The Spanish Civil War forced Pescara to return to France, and on February 28, 1933, the "Pescara Auto-compressor Company" was unveiled in Luxembourg. The auto-compressor company remained in business for 30 years, supported by six French patents with one of its shareholders, and the Pescara & Raymond Corporation, based in Dover, Delaware, USA. Pescara auto-compressors fulfill two basic designs: symmetrical and asymmetrical.

=== Free-piston engines and generators ===
During the Second World War, Pescara worked on electrical power in Portugal. Free-piston engines received new attention when they were mass-produced by the Société Industrielle Générale de Mécanique Appliquée (SIGMA), a French company that developed the GS-34, a 1138-horsepower generator. In 1963, Pescara rejoined his sons in Paris where he served as an expert for S.N. Marep during the testing of its 2000-horsepower EPLH-40. Pescara subsequently proposed the production of more powerful machines - new tandem generators based on the existing EPLH-40 and GS-34 - but died in Paris, France, before the company that was to develop the engineer's proposal was established.

== See also ==
- Castaibert aircraft
- Helicopter
- Helicopter rotor
- History of aviation
- Density altitude
- Invention
- Robert Huber (engineer)
