= Helical camshaft =

A helical camshaft is a type of mechanical variable valve actuation (VVA) system. More specifically, it is a camshaft that allows the valve opening duration to be varied over a wide, continuous, step-less range, with all of the added duration being at full valve lift.

In this article variable duration camshaft refers to a camshaft with a design that is intended to replace a conventional camshaft in a cylinder head and operates the valves through conventional followers. Further qualifications are:

- The duration range is step-less and continuous.
- All the added range is at full valve lift.
- The range is wide enough to allow full torque and power at even extremely high rotational speed.
- The range is wide enough to allow engine load control by late inlet valve closing (LIVC).
- The rates of valve opening and closing, acceleration, jerk etc. are within acceptable limits at all duration settings.

These qualifications must be made as there have been many claims over the years of purely mechanical variable duration camshafts but none have been able to meet all these requirements.

Despite enormous effort and expense being expended by both large organisations and private individuals, camshaft arrangements like U.S. patent 1,527,456 have never been significantly improved upon and have remained unused by the mainstream automotive community. The opinion of many engineers (and others) on the possibility of a workable variable duration camshaft being developed after so much effort and so many years of unsuccessful attempts was that it was highly unlikely that it ever could be done and would remain an unobtainable “holy grail.”

== Details ==
The helical camshaft very distantly belongs to the very numerous general coaxial-shaft-combined-profile class of cams as most recently typified by the work from Clemson University (whose cams are essentially identical in principle to many other cams, such as U.S. patent 1,527,456).

The helical camshaft importantly differs from other members of this general class by having a unique helical movement – a combined circumferential and axial movement of the two profiles.

The duration can be increased until the closing flank of the cam lobe reaches the opening flank – a duration of 720 degrees. In a typical application the helical camshaft would have a continuous duration range from about average for a road-going general purpose engine (about 250 degrees measured at normal valve clearance) to about 100 or 150 degrees above this.

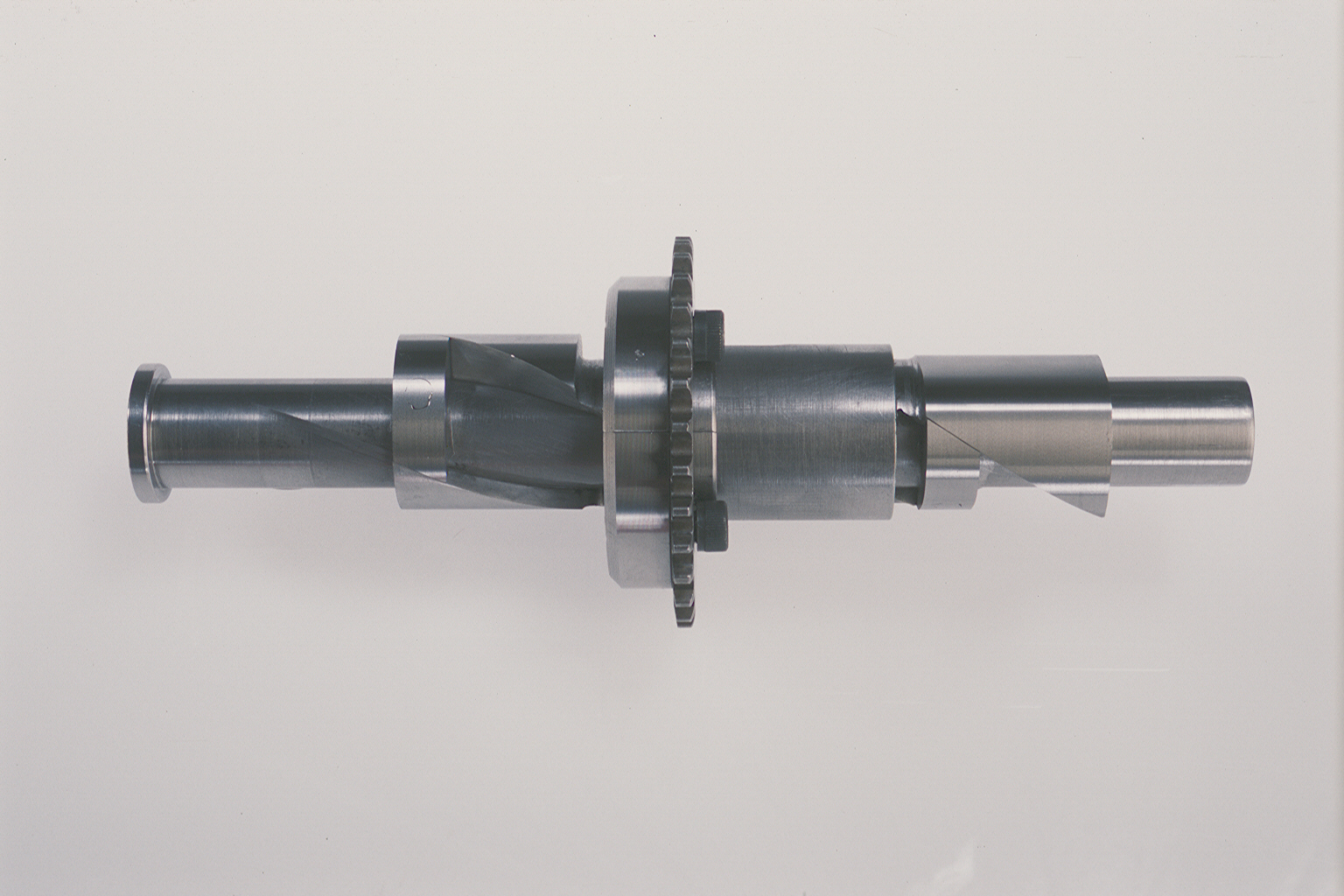
Figure 1: A prototype helical camshaft. The camshaft is in the minimum duration position.

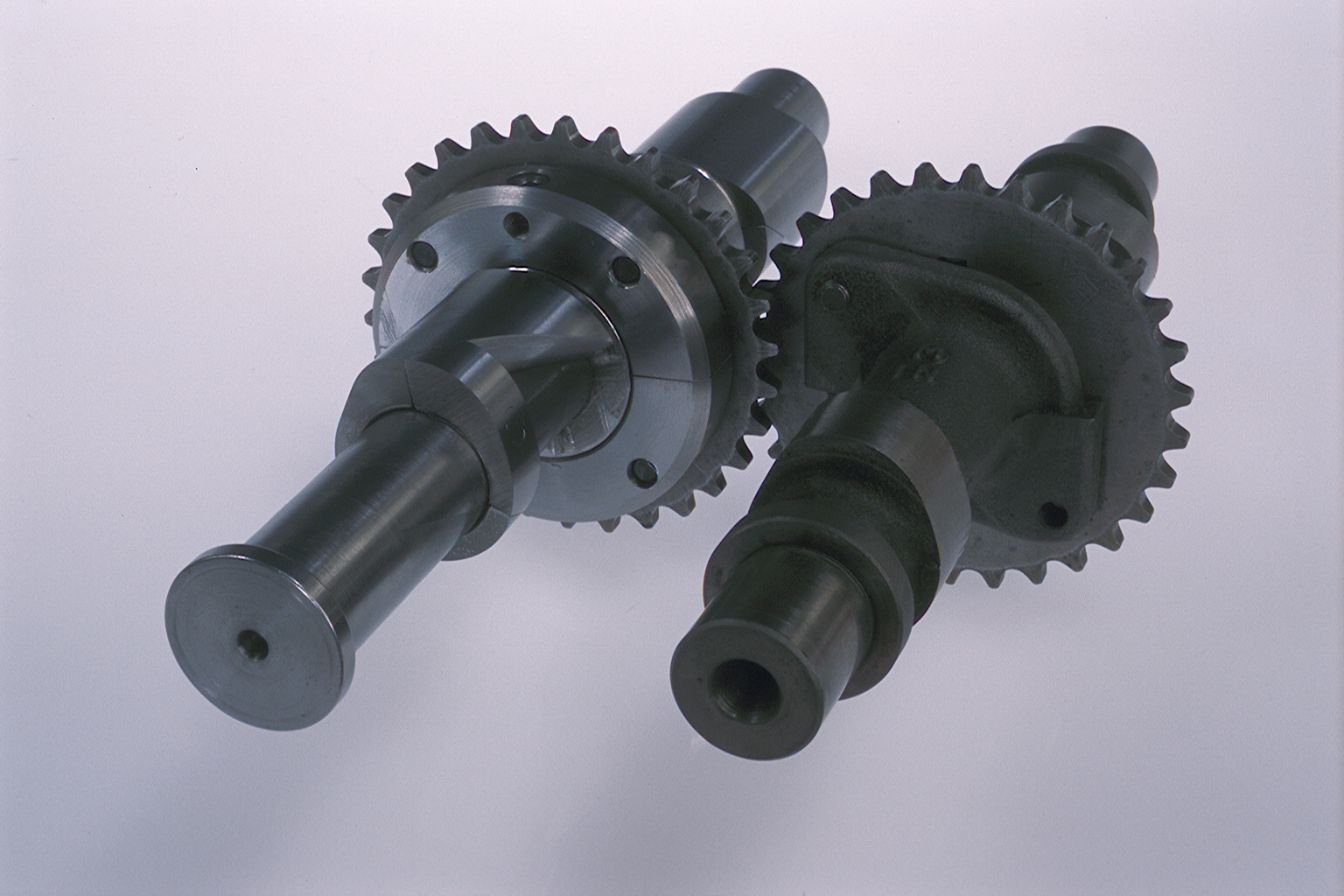
Figure 2: A helical camshaft for the intake on a Suzuki GSX 250 motorcycle engine, with a standard GSX camshaft for comparison

The valve is opened at normal rates of acceleration, jerk, etc. And then held open at its maximum lift for whatever duration is required before being closed at a normal rate.

== The mechanism ==
A helical camshaft effects its duration change basically by rotating the opening and closing flanks away from each other starting at a split line on the nose of the lobe. As the flanks move apart the nose region is “filled-in” with an area of constant radius about the centre of rotation of the camshaft. An equal angular amount is removed from the constant radius base circle as the nose constant radius increases.

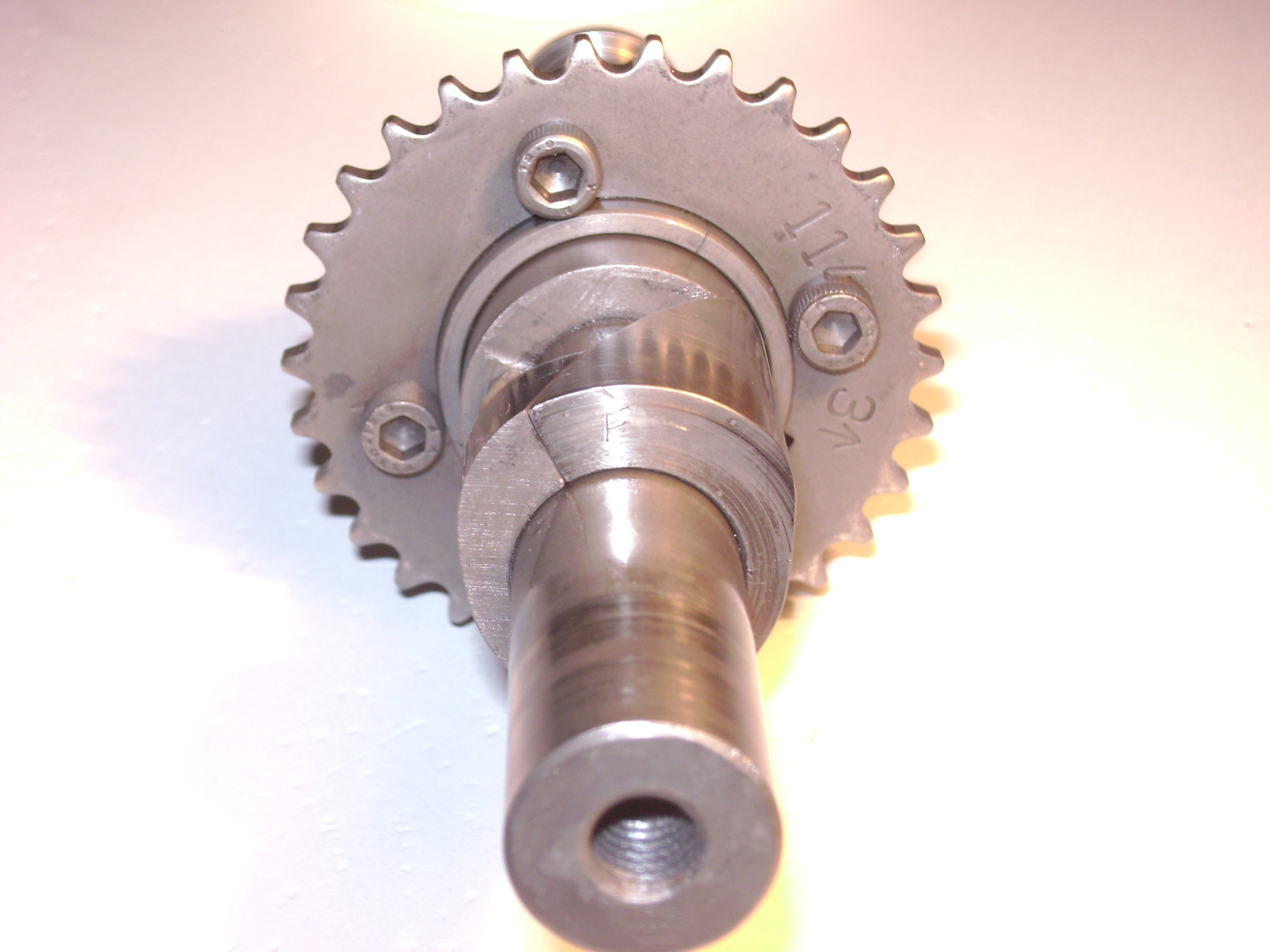
Maximum duration position

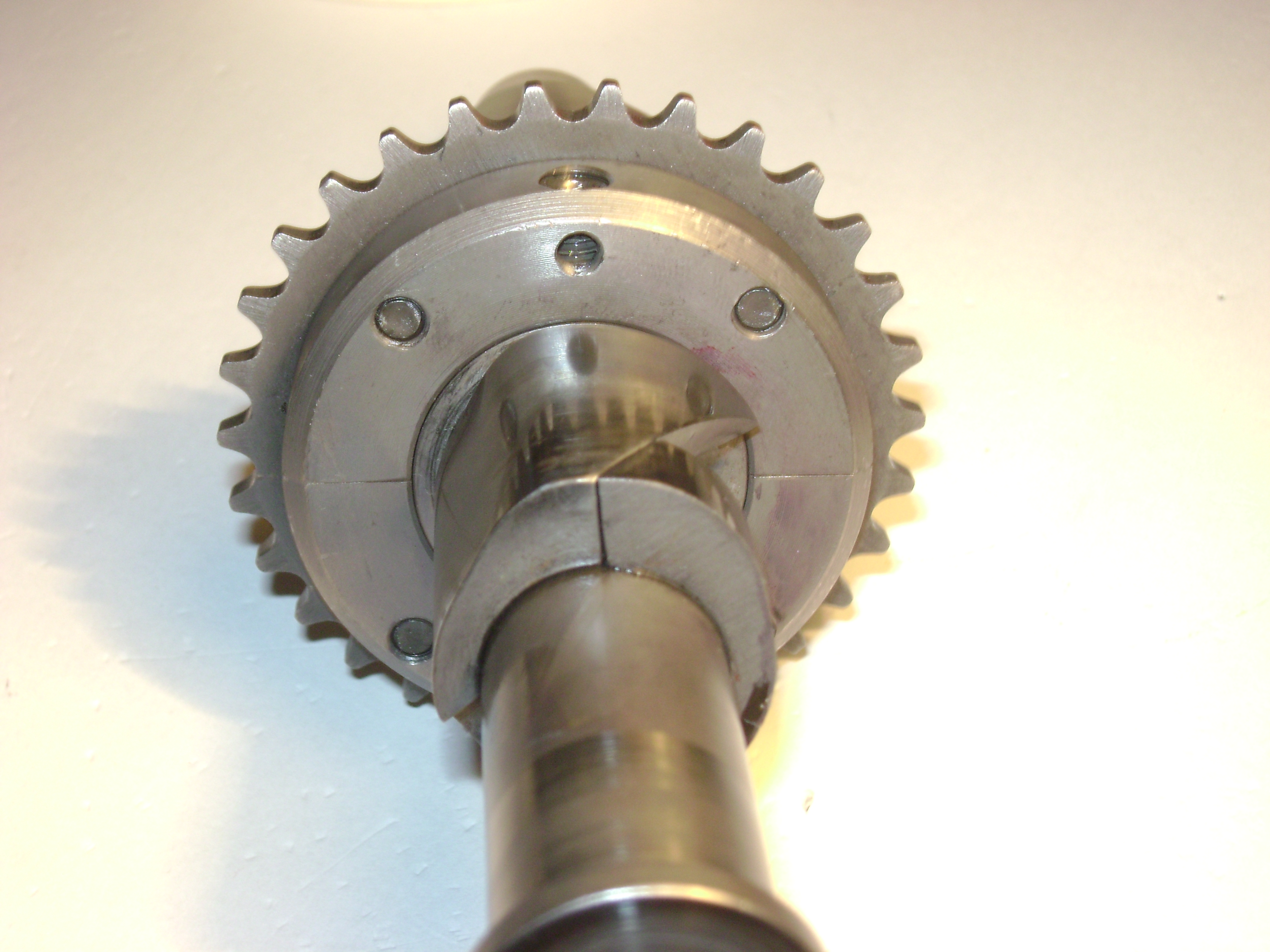
Minimum duration position. There is a stepless range of duration settings between these two extremes.

For the camshaft shown, the minimum duration is the same as the original camshaft's, about 260°, and the maximum duration is 345°.

The mechanism is a coaxial shaft arrangement where the outer shaft carries the main body of the cam lobe. The main body of the cam lobe is in its maximum duration form.

Typically the main lobe body would have a duration of about 450°. The lobe is very long axially, about 45 mm (1.8 in), and its profile consists of conventional opening and closing flanks separated by about 170° of constant radius over the nose of the lobe. The lobe has a helical slot machined into it that has a helix angle of about 35° relative to the rotational axis of the camshaft.

The width of the slot is equal to the angular extent of the closing flank of the lobe. One edge of the slot extends diagonally the full length of the lobe across the 170 degree constant nose radius. The other edge is ground so that it is all at base circle level. The slot in fact replaces the closing flank on the main body of the cam lobe. Bridging the slot is a segment of lobe (about 10 mm in thickness) which is ground to the profile of the closing flank. The segment is attached to the inner shaft. One edge of the slot has a constant cylindrical radius, the same radius as the lobe's nose radius. The other edge has the radius of the lobe's base circle. A small region along each edge of the closing flank segment has the same constant radius as the edge of the slot that it is adjacent to.

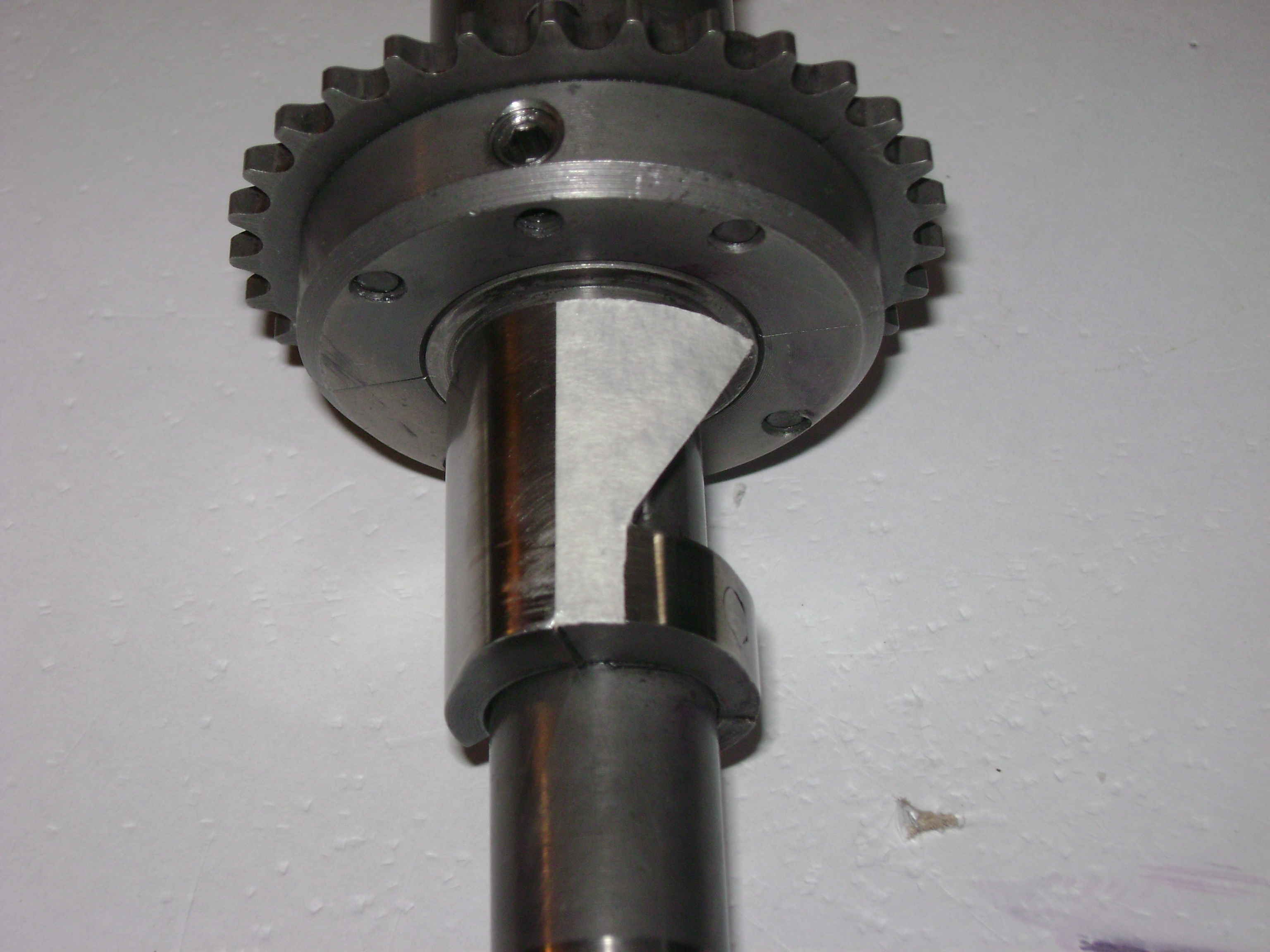
The area of constant nose radius is marked by white masking tape on a black background.

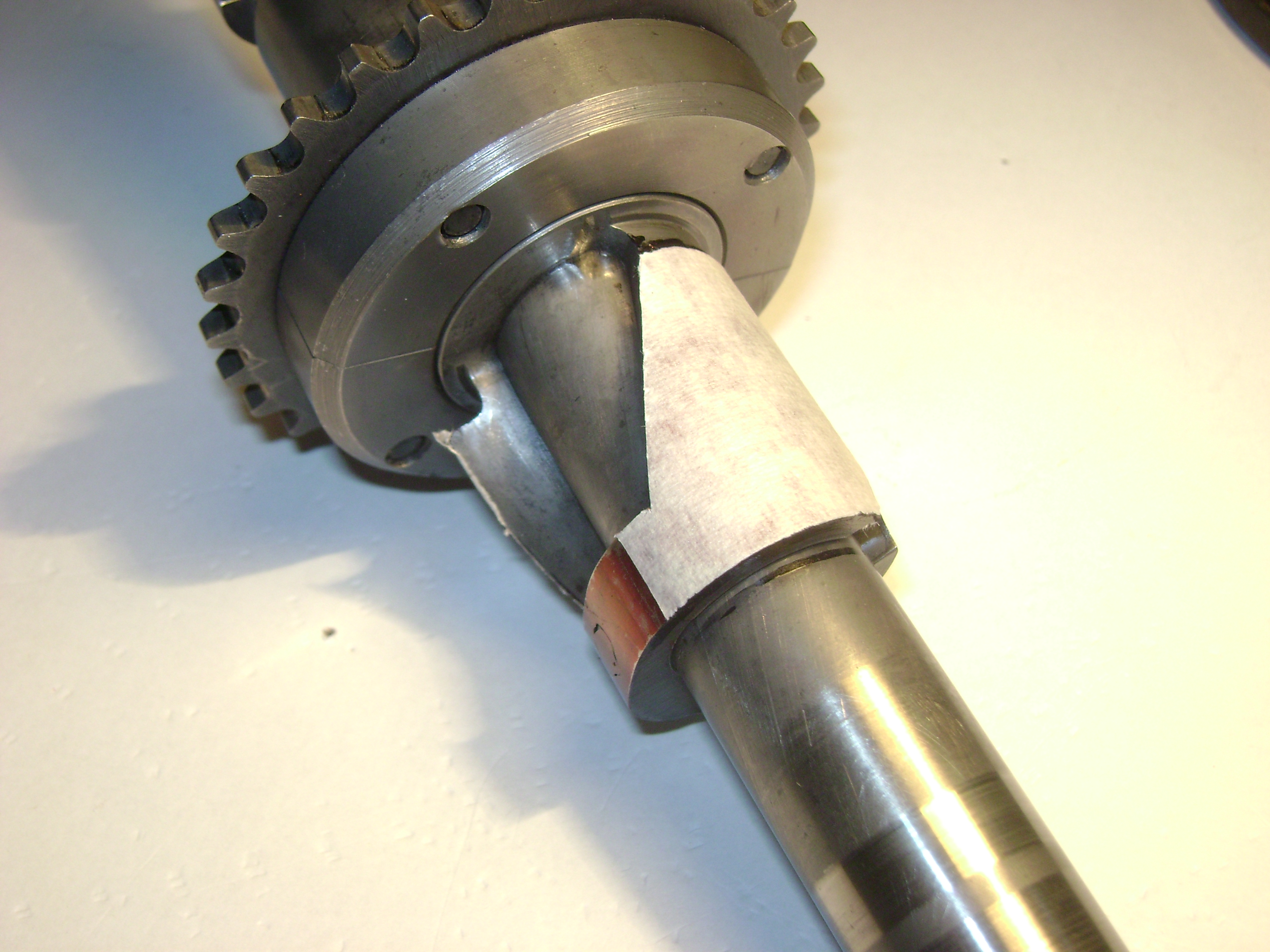
The constant radius base circle is in masking tape on a red background.

This means the segment can be positioned anywhere along the helical slot and there will always be a smooth transition for the follower to and from the segment. The lobe segment is fixed to the inner shaft so any relative axial movement has the effect of changing the valve opening duration. The follower is arranged so that it always remains aligned with the segment which remains stationary axially.

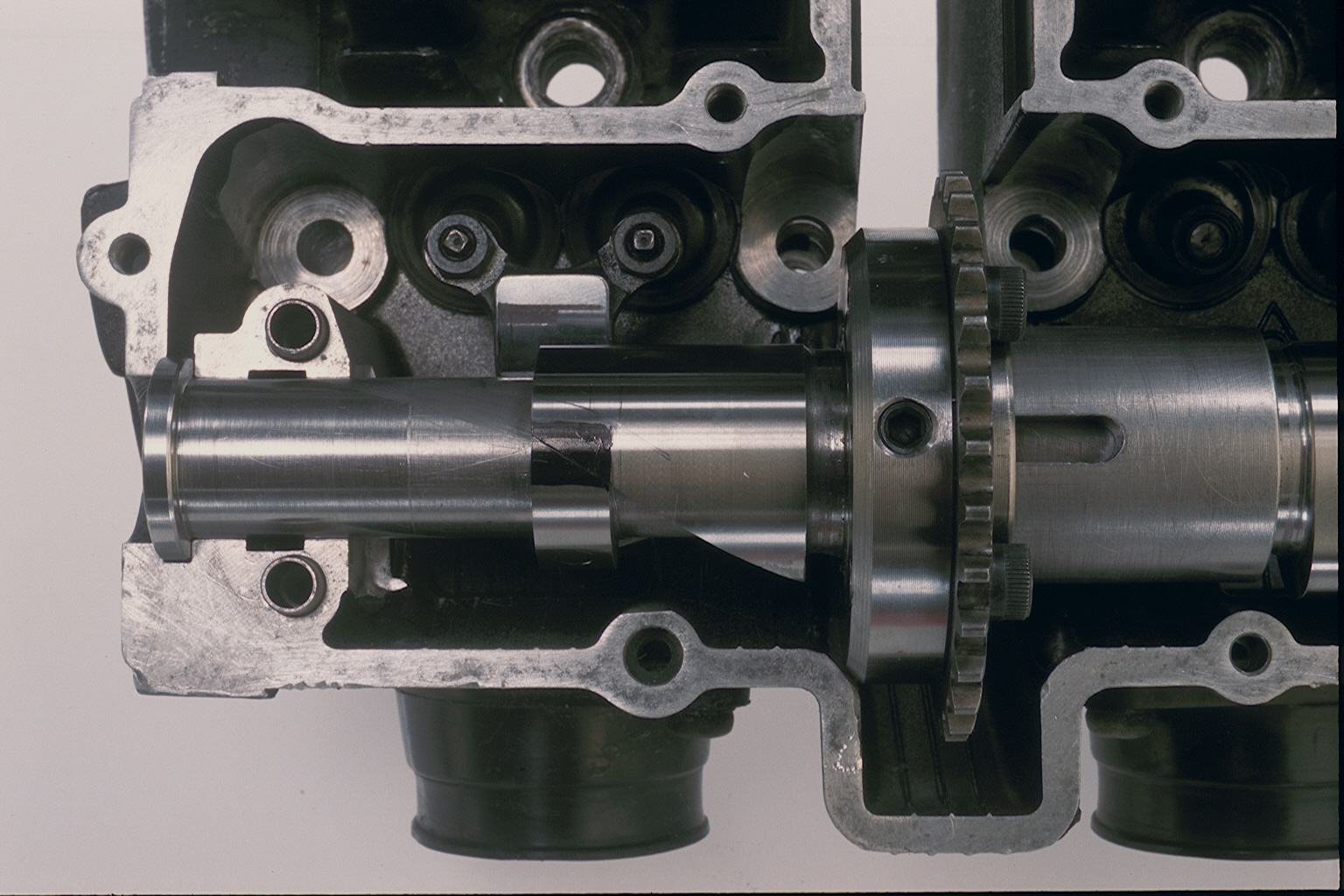
The camshaft in its minimum duration position fitted in a head. Note that the lobe segment is aligned with the follower. The black felt tip pen marking is roughly the constant radius area.

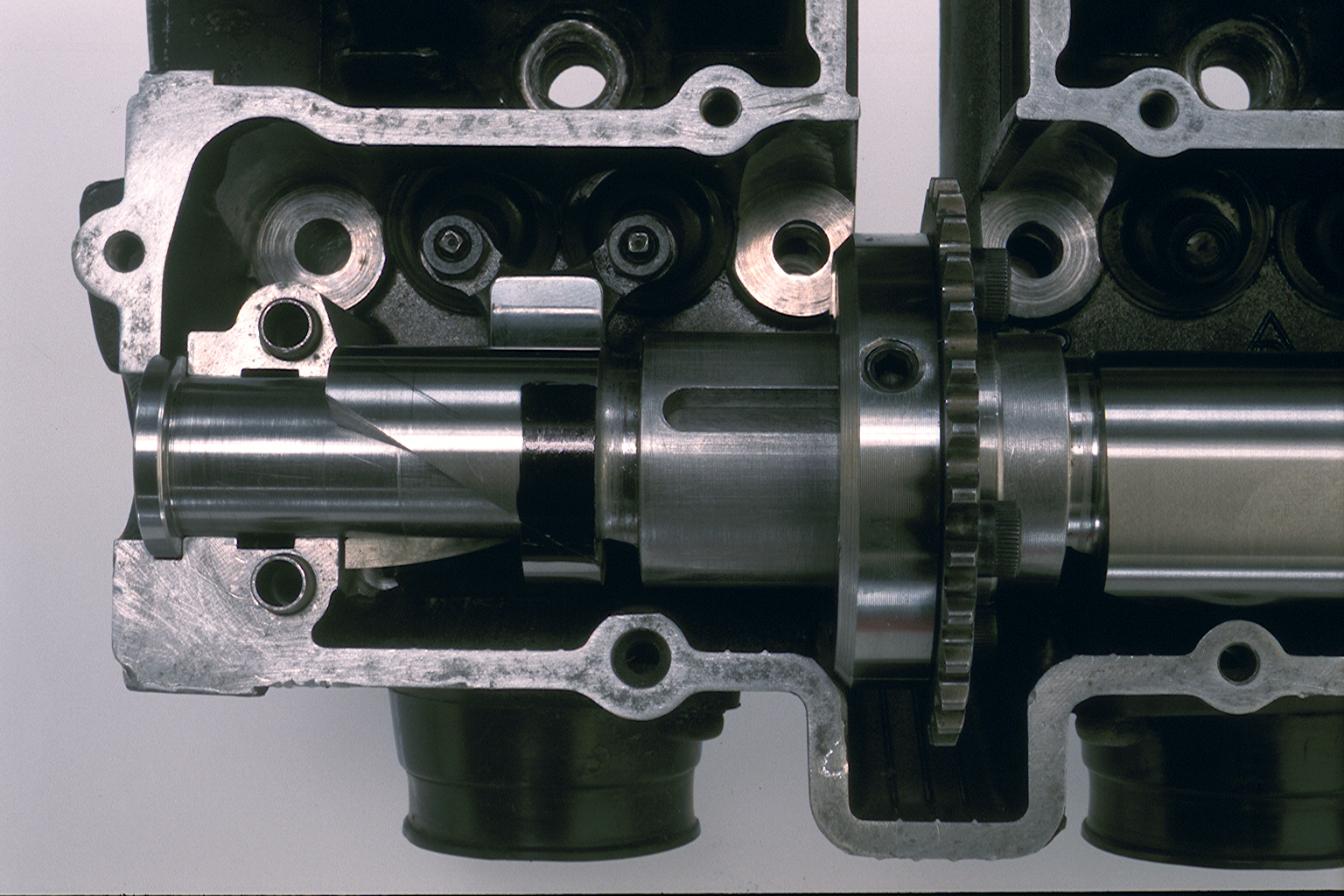
The camshaft is in its maximum duration position. Note that the segment remains aligned with the follower.

As the slot has a helix angle of about 35°, any axial movement of the outer shaft causes the segment to rotate, exposing more or less of the nose constant radius and thus changing the duration.

== Profile ==
The base or shortest duration profile of the helical camshaft system is almost identical to a standard production engine profile. The helical camshaft base profile belongs to the general group of lobe shapes which are used with pivoting cam followers, especially those with a fairly high rocker ratio, around 2:1.

This family of lobe profiles is characterised primarily by having a short lobe lift. Because of this the lobe has a very rounded-off (or “snub-nosed”) appearance. The radius of curvature of the nose region (about the axis of rotation of the camshaft) is often very close to being a constant radius over an angular extent of about 20 degrees or so. A helical camshaft requires this region to be a true constant radius. In some cases this requires as little as 0.25 mm (or less) to be removed from the nose. When measured, the rates of acceleration and jerk in the nose region are slightly higher than standard.

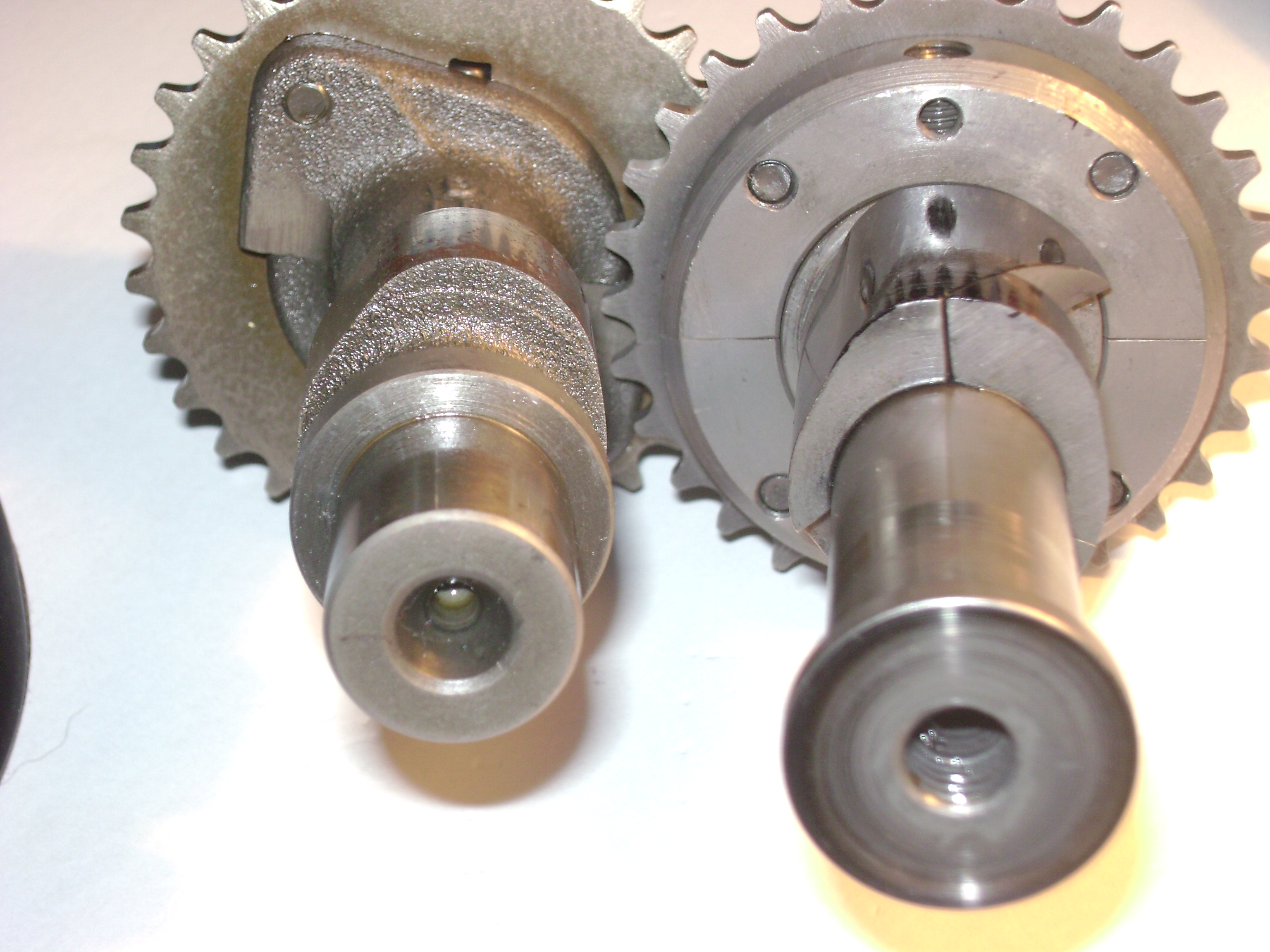
A comparison of the standard Suzuki camshaft lobe profile with the base duration profile of the helical camshaft shows that they are virtually identical.

The lobe nose typically can have about 150° added to it, for extra duration. The lift surface geometry remains unchanged. Because of this extended duration the lift rate and total lift do not have to be as extreme as a racing cam to achieve maximum high end power.

== Applications ==
The conventional application of VVA (especially variable duration) is to match the engine RPM to the valve opening duration (this is very roughly what the VTEC does). The general idea being to improve the high RPM performance without the associated problems of a long-duration racing cam which are lack of lower RPM power, rough idle, etc. Engines typically need a roughly linear increase in duration as the RPM rises. The aim is to maximise the torque at every point in the allowable RPM range. This means that with the helical camshaft the old concept of a maximum power point in an RPM range no longer applies. With the helical camshaft the power continues to build until the “breathing” limit of the induction system is reached – or more likely, the mechanical strength limit of the engine's components is exceeded. The helical camshaft's typical 250 degree to 350 + degree duration range basically means that a suitably robust engine could “pull” strongly from about 1500 RPM to maybe 20,000 + RPM and still idle smoothly at 500 or 600 RPM.

There has never been a mechanical VVA system that had either the duration range at full lift or the high RPM capability to do anything like this. “Camless” electromagnetic/hydraulic systems do have similar duration/lift ranges to the helical camshaft but at present their high RPM ability is strictly limited.

On a possibly somewhat more practical level, dynamometer testing of road engines has shown that even with the helical camshaft limited to only about 30 degrees increase in duration, a typical road engine can increase its power by 25% to 30% at the same RPM power peak as the standard cam – and the idle and low RPM behaviour are totally normal.

The application of the helical camshaft as a fuel saving tool is possibly an even more important application than just to maximise the power output of an engine. Testing of a helical camshaft prototype in a Suzuki GSX 250 cc engine has a shown a remarkable improvement in fuel economy at idle speeds. This particular helical camshaft is arranged so that all the duration increase is on the closing side of the intake cam lobe, the opening point of the intake valve remaining as standard on a Suzuki GSX 250 engine. The object of this was to test the effectiveness of LIVC on the idle fuel consumption.

The basic aim of LIVC is to reduce the intake pumping losses. These pumping losses are greatest at idle, progressively reducing as the manifold pressure (and the power output) increases. The test Suzuki engine consistently recorded a 40% improvement in economy at idle, when compared to the same engine with the standard camshaft fitted. This may seem a little unlikely, but it should be remembered that it has been estimated that at idle about 80% of the fuel used is just to overcome the intake pumping losses. Any reduction in pumping losses thus has a major and direct effect on the idle fuel use. As the power output rises, the 40% would quickly drop away but for an engine in typical road/traffic use an overall figure would be probably between 10% and 20% improvement. The surprising improvement in fuel economy at idle possibly only applies to carburetor engines like the Suzuki. Just how a modern multi-cylinder fuel injected car engine would behave with the helical camshaft is as yet untested. It seems likely that there would be a marked improvement in idle economy but maybe not 40% – at least not without other modifications. The Suzuki idled at about 55 or 60 extra degrees of late closing. That is; about 120 degrees after bottom dead centre. This means that the total duration required was around 320 degrees. Engine load control by LIVC needs very long durations. Usually a much longer duration is needed for load control by LIVC than would be needed for high RPM power, especially for a general-purpose road-going application. Importantly all this very long valve opening duration, when used for LIVC, must be at full valve lift. The valve lift must be at a maximum so as not to impede the flow into and out of the cylinder. Any restriction to the flow causes pumping losses which defeats the whole purpose of LIVC.

Having discussed the use of the helical camshaft to aid high RPM power and also for load control by LIVC it should be made clear that there is no reason why both functions could not be used in the same engine. Realistically the helical camshaft principle can only be applied to twin cam engines. For maximising power output both the intake and exhaust cam would need to be of the helical camshaft type. The increase in duration needed for high RPM performance needs to be roughly equal on both the intake and exhaust cams, and roughly a symmetrical increase about the base duration lobe profile centre line. For LIVC operation alone, only the intake camshaft needs to be a helical camshaft. With a twin helical camshaft arrangement and suitable controls, an engine could have both extreme power output and also be very fuel efficient.

There is also the possibility of even greater fuel efficiency at the expense of outright power. The helical camshaft and the general principle of LIVC also allow the possible use of a very high compression ratio (CR). The idea here being to use a very high geometrical CR but limit the compression pressure by LIVC so as to avoid detonation. The expansion ratio after combustion still remains high. It is the expansion ratio that fundamentally converts the heat energy of the burning fuel/air mixture into usable mechanical energy. The more the expanding hot gases move the piston the more the heat energy is converted into useful work and the higher the thermal efficiency is. This general principle is usually called the “Atkinson cycle”. (Strictly speaking the Atkinson cycle refers to an engine with mechanically different length compression and expansion strokes. In modern practice, the compression pressure is limited by a fixed amount of intake valve late closing – this has exactly the same effect as the different stroke lengths). With the Atkinson cycle the added efficiency is at the expense of reduced overall power. For example, if an engine had a geometrical CR of 18:1 it would have to be restricted to about half its full charge of air/fuel mixture to avoid detonation. The resulting effect would be that at full load the engine would use half the fuel but the power would be not half but roughly two-thirds or three quarters that of the equivalent “normal” engine – the net result being an increase in thermal efficiency. Such an engine would be economical but it would still suffer from intake pumping losses.

The helical camshaft would allow both the Atkinson cycle and LIVC to be applied simultaneously. The high CR would allow even greater amount of LIVC to be used at idle thus further reducing pumping losses and improving efficiency. The resulting engine would have a fuel economy very similar to (or better than) a diesel – and it could run on the cheaper LPG fuel. It would also be lighter in weight and cheaper to make than a diesel. A car fitted with such an engine would appear to be a much simpler and cheaper alternative to a “hybrid” car. (But a hybrid fitted with a helical camshaft/Atkinson/LIVC engine would be more economical still).

One of the more recent “fashionable” areas of engine research at present is the homogeneous charge compression ignition (HCCI) engine. It amounts to running a spark ignition engine at light or part load in a similar fashion to a diesel engine. HCCI requires the compression pressure to be very quickly and accurately altered so that the more-or-less controlled compression ignition doesn't suddenly blossom into full-blown detonation. One of the main strengths of the helical camshaft is that it can do exactly that. However, it would seem that the easily controlled LIVC (with or without Atkinson high CR effects) is a much simpler way to control an engine than the decidedly risky HCCI process – and it is doubtful that HCCI is more fuel-efficient than LIVC, etc.

== Operation ==
The duration of the helical camshaft is changed by moving the outer shaft of the coaxial arrangement in a lengthwise (or axial) direction. The helix angle of the helical camshaft is probably always going to be around 30 to 35 degrees. The helix angle has its origin in the width of the segment used (normally about 10 mm or 0.39 in) and the 20-degree region of constant radius on the nose of the lobe (this usually measures about 7 mm in circumference). The diagonal split line across this area thus must generally be at about 35 degrees to the axis of the camshaft. This translates to a figure of around 3.5 (crankshaft) degrees per millimetre of axial movement. 30 mm (1.2 in) of movement would give 105 degrees of duration change. Although the helical camshaft is capable of far more than this, it has been found in testing that this amount is sufficient for most purposes.

Little force is needed to move the shaft axially so there is a possibility that when using the helical camshaft for LIVC load control alone the axial movement could be connected directly and mechanically to the accelerator pedal. Similarly, if the helical camshaft is used to improve high RPM power only a simple self-contained centrifugal controller/actuator could be used.

Some prototypes have run very well using centrifugal controller/actuators. If it was desired to operate the helical camshaft to use both the LIVC and the high RPM aspects of the cam it would probably require hydraulic actuators on each cam to enable the LIVC to be used. Each helical camshaft would also need a phase-changing mechanism for the high RPM use. At low RPM and part-load the helical camshaft would be all LIVC. At high RPM and full load it would still require long duration from the helical camshaft but the phase changing mechanism would need to alter the all-on-the-closing-flank duration increase to something of a more symmetrical duration increase. All this possibly could be done mechanically but the sensible arrangement probably would be an externally powered arrangement with a computer/microprocessor to sort out the required amounts LIVC and phasing. For HCCI operation the picture is less clear but the very short (and thus very fast) axial movement that would be needed to change the compression pressure would seem to make the helical camshaft very suitable for this process.

== Practical considerations ==
The disadvantage of this system is its cost. Even though it is a fairly simple device it requires very accurate helical machining and very careful assembly. The helical camshaft prototypes typically cost about $1500 in machining and materials. This figure would reduce greatly in production. The cost of the helical camshaft is really only high when considered in comparison to a conventional camshaft which reportedly cost the manufacturers only a few dollars per unit to make. This fact does tend to make the helical camshaft look more expensive than it really is. Having said this, the cost of the helical camshaft (and associated controls etc.) is probably very similar to (or even cheaper) than other production VVA systems.

The various prototypes have never shown any wear or ultimate strength (breakage) problems in the many hours of testing (some at very high RPM) they have undergone. But as a production car camshaft must ideally last for the life of the vehicle, there must remain some doubt until really long-term testing is carried out. However, indications are that there would probably be no insoluble long-term problems.

A helical camshaft must operate through a lift-multiplying pivoting follower. The helical camshaft could not really be used with an inverted bucket type of follower. Even though the inverted bucket is still used, it is being increasingly replaced both in road and racing engines by the pivoting “finger” follower. As well as needing a pivoting follower, if the engine has four valves per cylinder then the follower must be forked so that the one helical camshaft lobe operates two valves. This is more a characteristic than a problem. If a really wide duration range is required, because axial space is somewhat limited along the camshaft, usually only room for one helical camshaft lobe (and its operating space) can be found.

A helical camshaft cannot do very short durations or variable lift. Many companies and manufacturers have made it appear that it is something of a virtue that their particular VVA system produces very short durations and the linked low valve lift as they really have had no choice.

There is no physical reason why a helical camshaft could not be the “driving” cam in a Valvetronic-type oscillating cam setup. (But it would be quite complex and the Valvetronic part of the arrangement would limit the helical camshaft's high RPM capabilities). The result would be an almost unbelievable array of possible duration/lift combinations. This could be very useful in research. However, in the real world probably 95% of the combinations have no really useful relevance to the four-stroke cycle. This, of course also applies to the helical camshaft to some extent. It is hard to imagine a use for more than about 400 degrees – and the helical camshaft potentially has another 300 or so degrees in hand.

== Graphs of lift, velocity, acceleration and jerk. ==
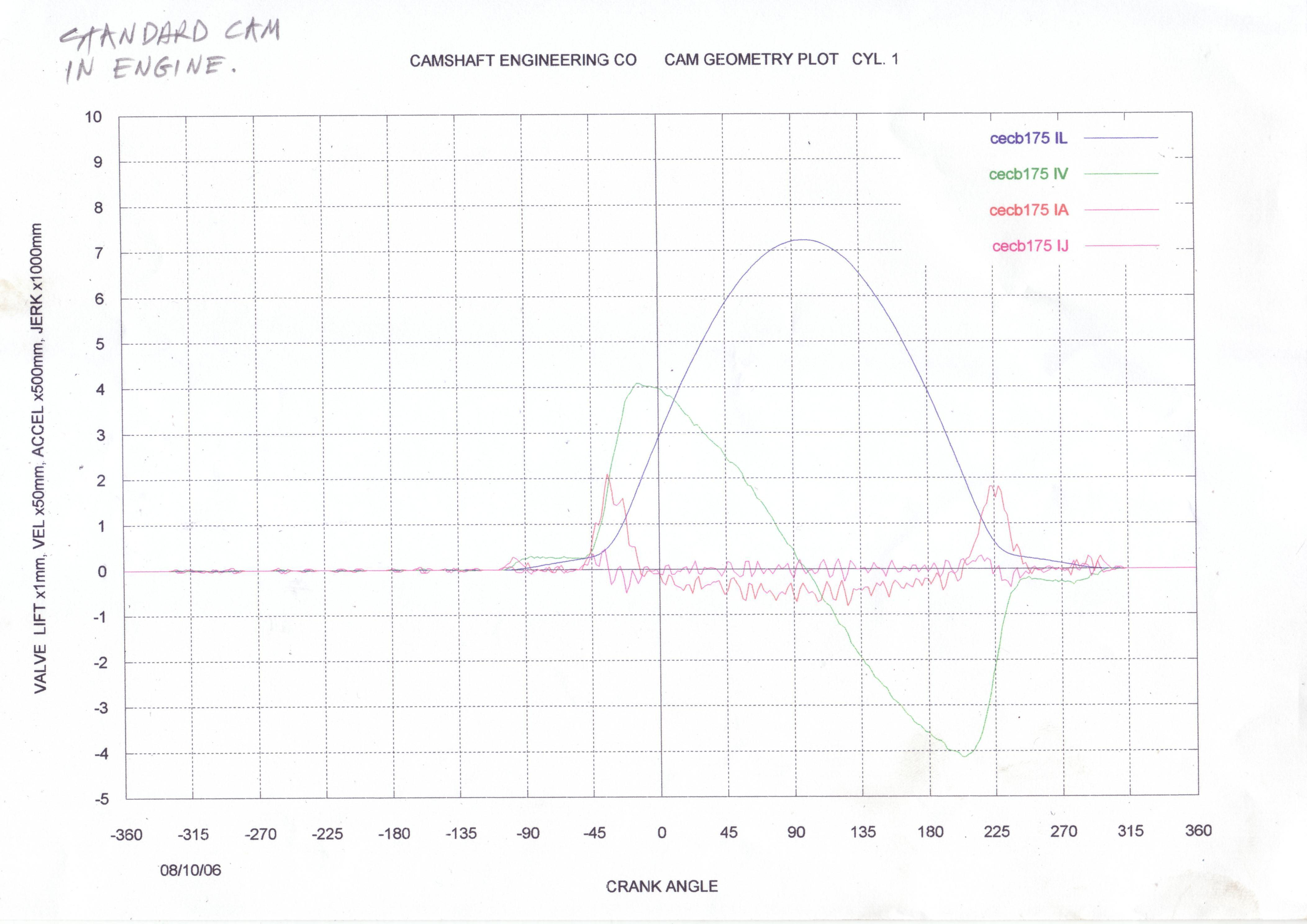
Suzuki GSX 250 standard cam

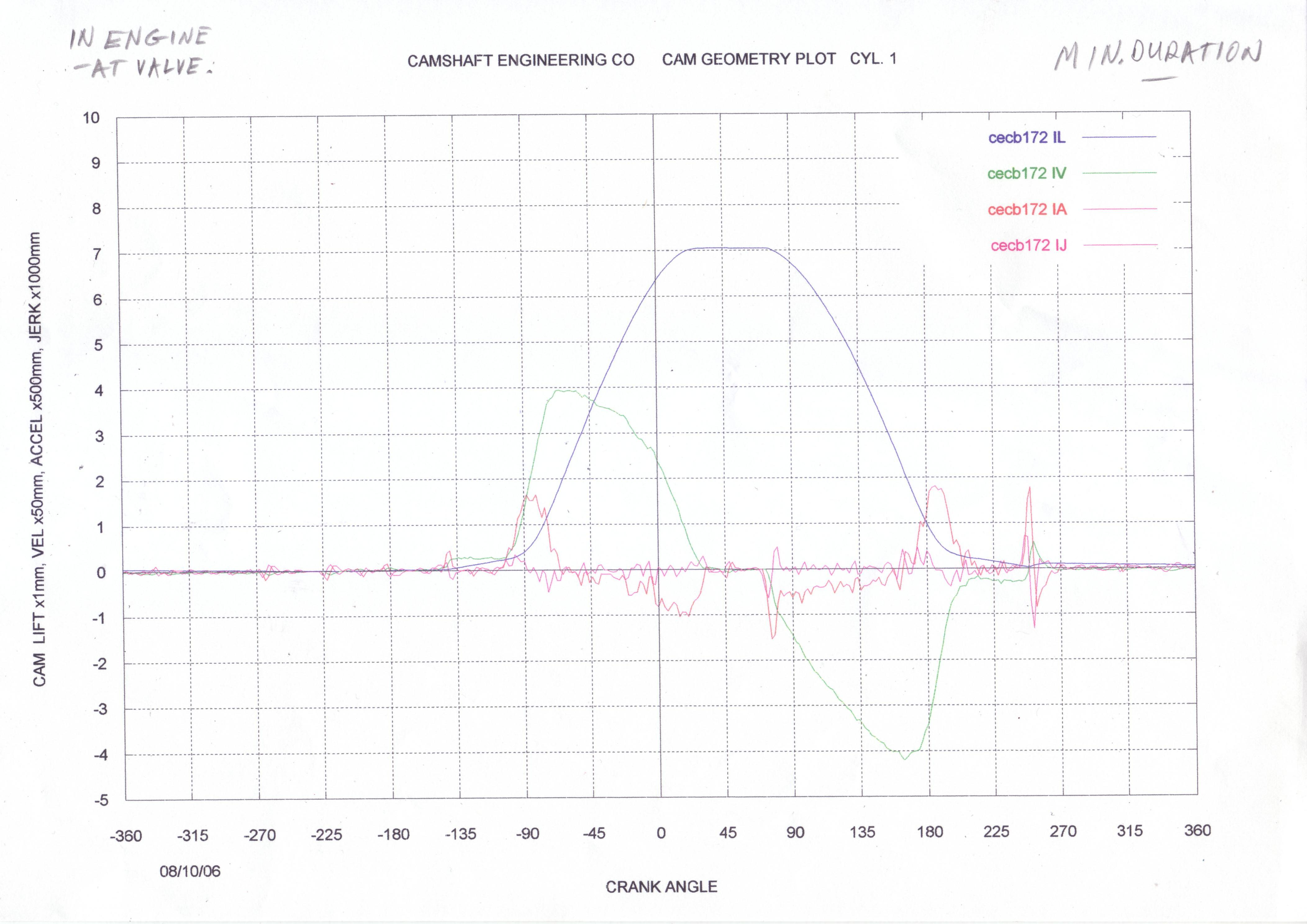
Suzuki helical cam – minimum duration

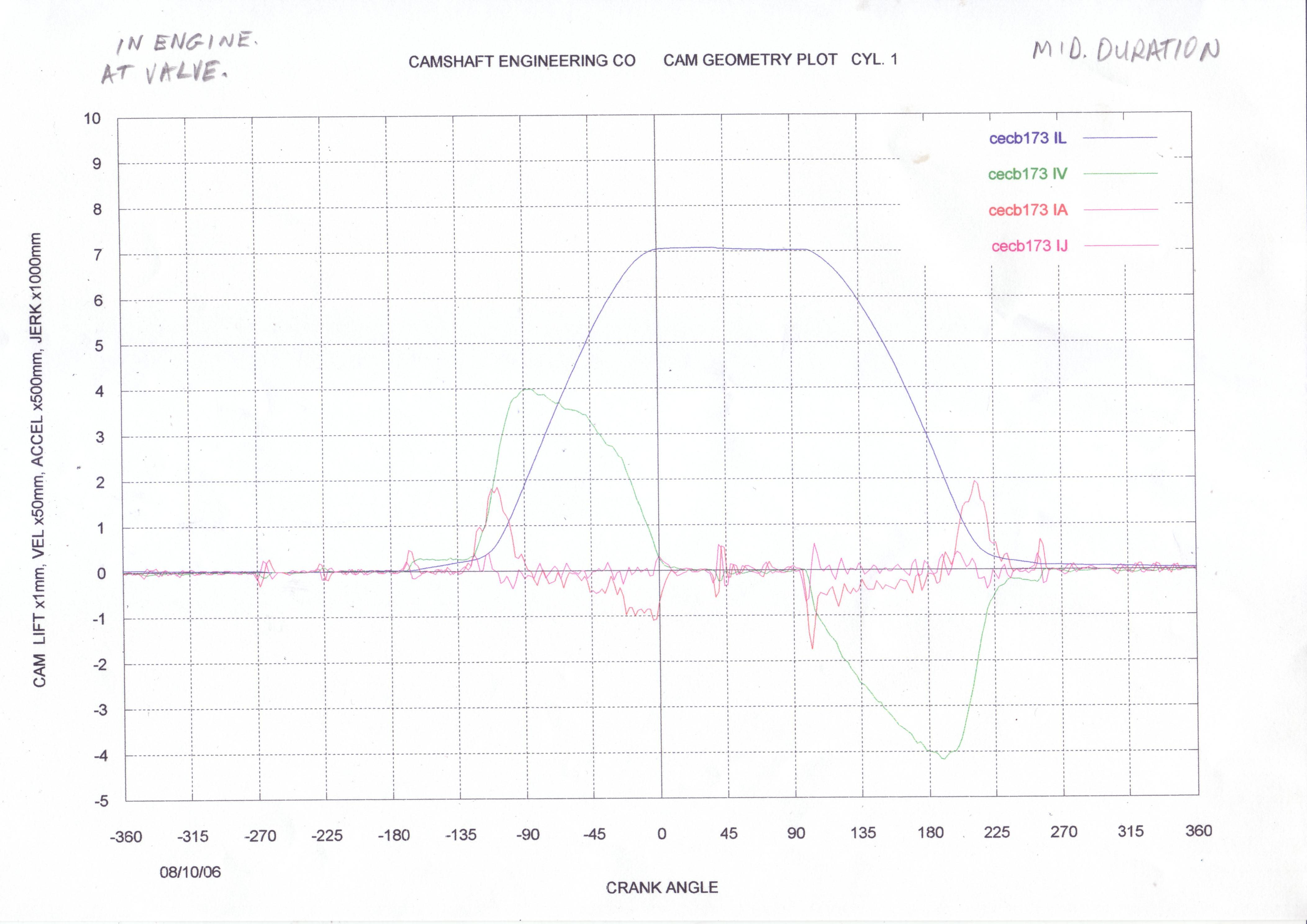
Suzuki helical cam – mid range duration

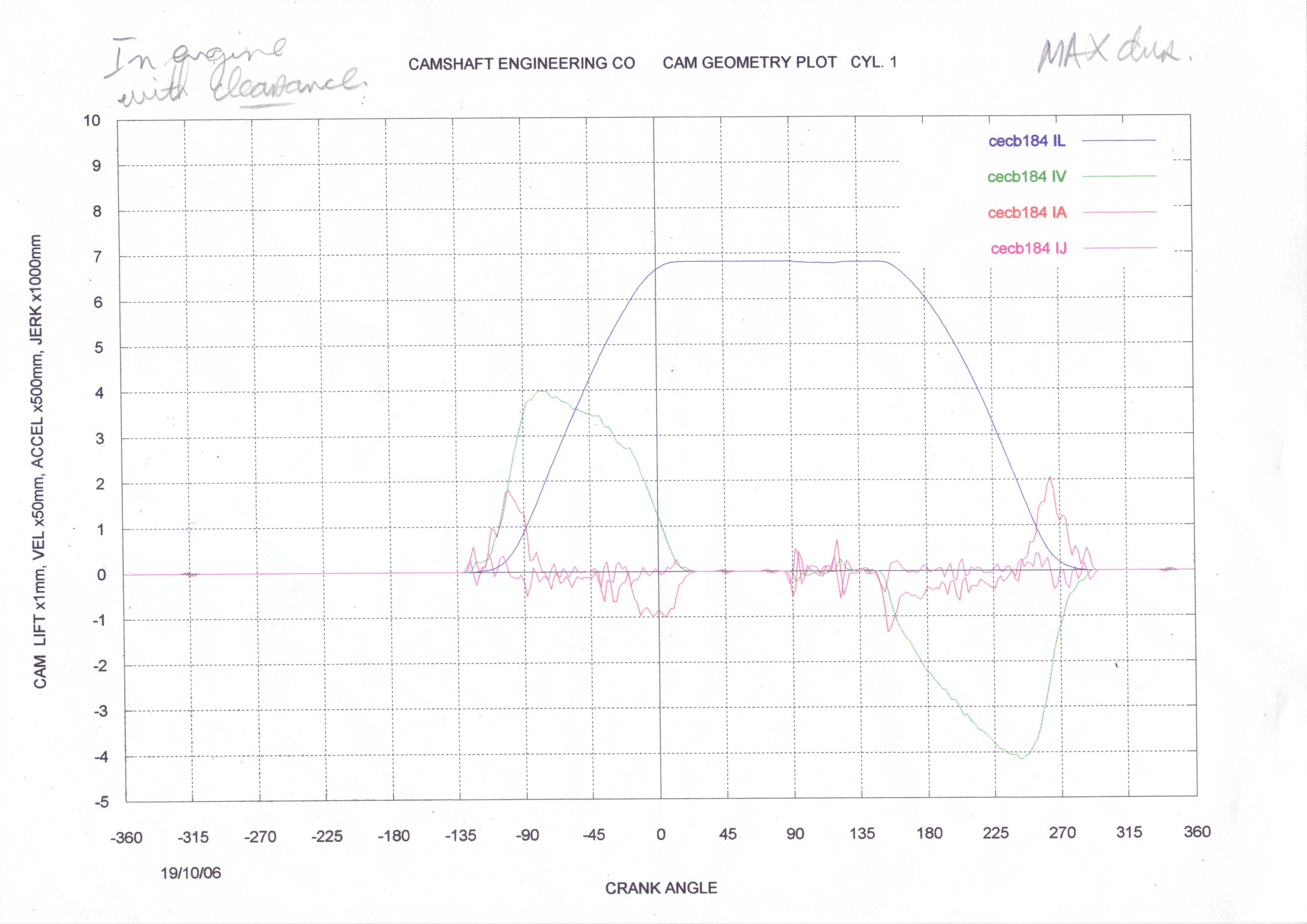
Suzuki helical cam – maximum duration setting
