= Robert Huber (engineer) =

Swiss engineer (1901–1995)

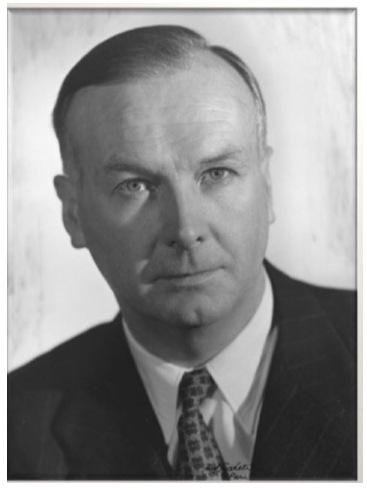
Robert Huber

Robert Huber (7 July 1901 – 7 April 1995) was a Swiss mechanical engineer.

== Life ==
Robert Huber was born on 7 July 1901 in Freienstein, Switzerland. He attended a primary school in Freienstein from 1908 to 1914 and a secondary school in Freienstein from 1914 to 1916. From 1916 to 1920, he attended a high school in Zürich. From 1920 to 1924, he studied at the Swiss Federal Institute of Technology (now ETH Zurich) under Professor Aurel Stodola.

On 12 August 1942, Huber married Ursula Meyer. Huber wrote a biography in the 1980s. He died on 7 April 1995.

== Career ==
In 1924, Huber became Technical Director of the Bureau Technique Pescara, where he supervised the design of nearly 30 different sizes and types of free-piston engine and acquired the nickname "Mr Free Piston". The first was the AC-2, running on petrol (gasoline). The second was the AC-3, which was similar but ran on diesel fuel. Eighteen types of free-piston engines were built and tested.

In 1932, Huber read a book by Professor Lomonosov about diesel locomotives. He also heard of a proposal by Petro Shelest for turbines driven by compressed air. This information gave him the idea of developing the free-piston gas turbine. Several of these were designed but not built. Finally, in 1938–39, the world's first free-piston generator was built. It used two G-30 machines and drove an 800 kW alternator.

Huber stayed at Bureau Technique Pescara (which became Société d'études mécaniques et énergétiques (SEME) in 1939) until 1962. During his time there, thousands of free-piston engines had been sold. Huber continued to work on free-piston engines until at least 1967.

Huber was a pioneer in the development of common rail fuel injection in the 1960s.

== Patents ==
Robert Huber has about 40 patents related to free-piston engines. A few examples are listed below:

- US2452194 (A), published 1948-10-26, Free piston machine
- US2645213 (A), published 1953-07-14, Free piston engine having hollow pistons
- US2943438 (A), published 1960-07-05, Improvements in free piston engine and gas turbine power plant
- US2990680 (A), published 1961-07-04, Devices for starting and stopping free piston machines and in particular free piston auto-generators
