= Stelzer engine =

Stelzer engine

The Stelzer engine is a two-stroke opposing-piston free-piston engine design proposed by Frank Stelzer. It uses conjoined pistons in a push-pull arrangement which allows for fewer moving parts and simplified manufacturing. An engine of the same design appeared on the cover of the February 1969 issue of Mechanix Illustrated magazine.

== Operation ==
There are two combustion chambers and a central precompression chamber. Control of the air flow between the precompression chamber and the combustion chambers is made by stepped piston rods.

== Applications ==
Applications envisaged for the engine include driving:

- An air compressor
- A hydraulic pump
- A linear generator

== Prototypes ==
A prototype engine was demonstrated in Frankfurt in 1983 and Opel was reported to be interested in it. In 1982, the Government of Ireland agreed to pay half the cost of a factory at Shannon Airport to manufacture the engines. A prototype car with a Stelzer engine and electric transmission was shown at a German motor show in 1983.

== See also ==
- Linear alternator
