= Linear alternator =

Type of electrical generator

A linear alternator is an electromechanical type of alternator that is essentially a linear motor used as an electrical generator.

An alternator generates alternating current (AC) electricity. It converts mechanical energy into electrical energy, unlike a motor, which converts electrical energy into mechanical energy. Although similar to other electric generators, an alternator typically uses rotary motion, while a linear alternator uses motion in a straight line, operating via electromagnetic induction. Moving-magnet linear alternators power thermoacoustic converters.

== History ==
In 2016 NASA introduced a double-fed induction linear alternator, which operates at 950°C for extreme environments such as aircraft systems and downhole drilling, achieving 25% greater efficiency than conventional models. The California Energy Commission funded a high-efficiency, ultra-low-emissions linear generator demonstration project in 2024 to support renewables with fuel-flexible dispatchable power. In 2025, researchers developed and validated a tubular permanent magnet linear alternator (PMLA) for free-piston engine applications. As of 2025, Hyliion's KARNO system integrates a sealed, 3D-printed linear heat engine with an alternator for modular prime power in data centers, defense, and microgrids.

== Theory ==
A linear alternator converts back-and-forth motion directly into electricity, eliminating the need for a crank or linkage to transform reciprocating motion into rotary motion for a generator.

== Applications ==
A shake flashlight uses a simple linear alternator. Shaking the device moves a permanent magnet through a coil, inducing an electric current via electromagnetic induction. This current charges a capacitor, storing energy to power a light-emitting diode until discharged. Further shaking recharges the capacitor. Other devices employing linear alternators include the free-piston linear generator, an internal combustion engine, and the free-piston Stirling engine, an external combustion engine. NASA’s Glenn Research Center developed a lightweight, double-fed induction linear alternator.

A linear heat engine integrated with an alternator can provide modular prime power in data centers, defense, and microgrids.

Other devices that use linear alternators to generate electricity include the free-piston linear generator, an internal combustion engine, and the free-piston Stirling engine, an external combustion engine.
