= Partially premixed combustion =

Partially premixed combustion (PPC), also known as PPCI (partially-premixed compression ignition) or GDCI (gasoline direct-injection compression-ignition) is a modern combustion process intended to be used in internal combustion engines of automobiles and other motorized vehicles in the future. Its high specific power, high fuel efficiency and low exhaust pollution have made it a promising technology. As a compression-ignition engine, the fuel mixture ignites due to the increase in temperature that occurs with compression rather than a spark from a spark plug. A PPC engine injects and premixes a charge during the compression stroke. This premixed charge is too lean to ignite during the compression stroke – the charge will ignite after the last fuel injection ends near TDC. The fuel efficiency and working principle of a PPC engine resemble those of Diesel engine, but the PPC engine can be run with a variety of fuels. Also, the partially premixed charge burns clean. Challenges with using gasoline in a PPC engine arise due to the low lubricity of gasoline and the low cetane value of gasoline. Use of fuel additives or gasoline-diesel or gasoline-biodiesel blends can mitigate the various problems with gasoline.

== See also ==
- Reactivity controlled compression ignition
- Diesel engine
