= Reactivity controlled compression ignition =

Form of internal combustion

Reactivity controlled compression ignition (RCCI) is a form of internal combustion developed at the Engine Research Center, University of Wisconsin–Madison, United States, by the research group of Wisconsin Distinguished Professor Rolf Reitz.

During RCCI combustion, well-mixed low-reactivity fuel and oxidizer (typically air) are compressed but not reaching auto-ignition. Later, still during compression cycle, high-reactivity fuel is injected to form a local mixture of low- and high-reactivity fuel. Finally the whole fuel charge is ignited near top dead center of the piston by injection of high-reactivity fuel. The RCCI combustion process requires two different fuels. Low-reactivity fuel gets injected into the intake ports with low pressure during the intake stroke. High-reactivity fuel gets injected into the cylinder with high pressure at the end of compression stroke. A throttle characteristic to Otto engines is not needed. Because of compression ignition and lack of throttle control, RCCI resembles much the diesel process. The dual-fuel RCCI can produce ultra-low NOx and soot emissions and higher thermal efficiency compared to conventional diesel combustion.

RCCI patents are controlled by University of Wisconsin–Madison’s Wisconsin Alumni Research Foundation (WARF). Several derivative ideas have also been experimented with by Caterpillar.

== See also ==
- Partially premixed combustion
- Diesel engine
