= Mercedes-Benz F700 =

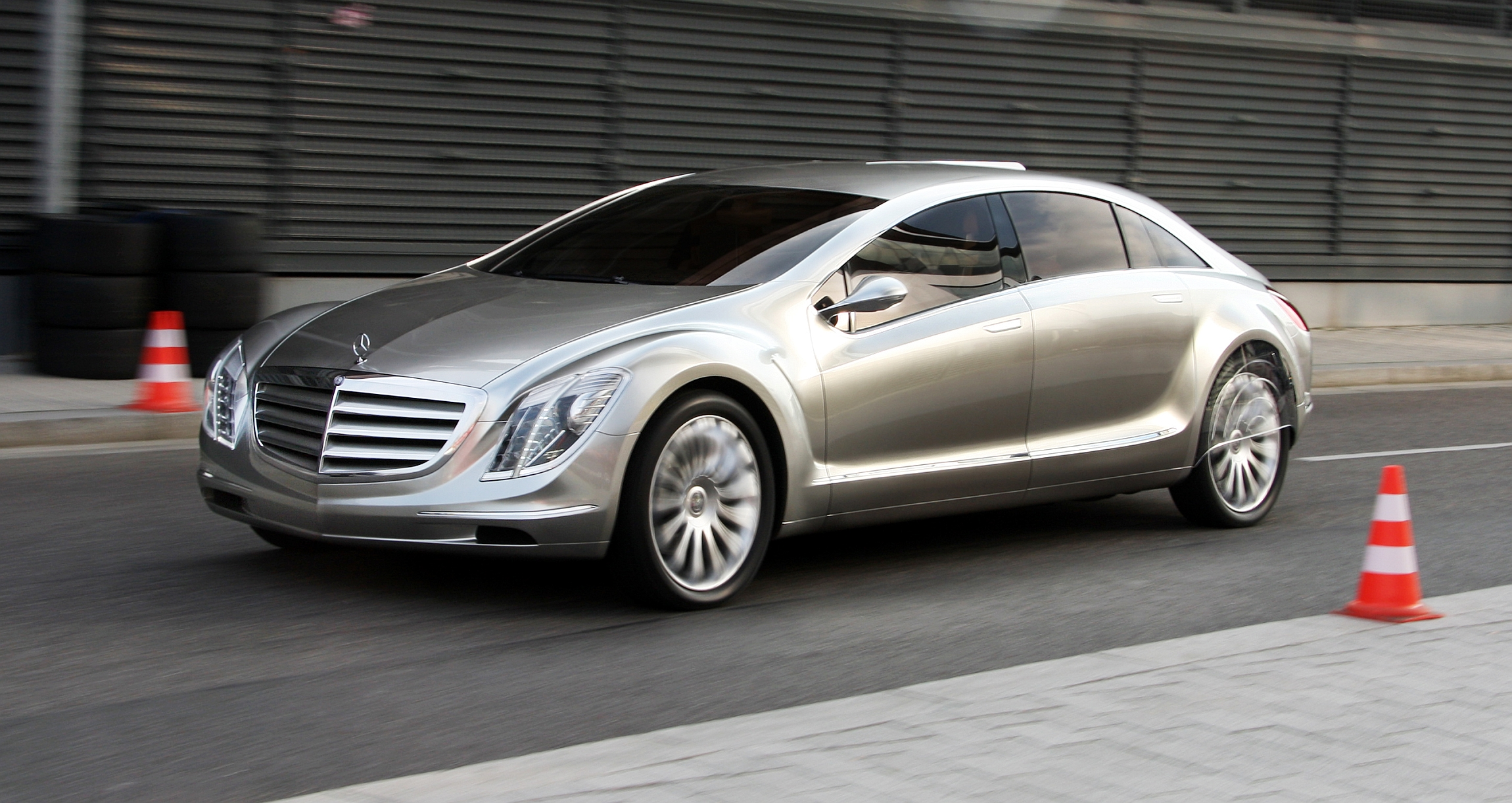

Overview
- Manufacturer: Daimler AG
- Production: 2007 (Concept car)

Body and chassis
- Class: Concept compact executive car (D)
- Body style: 4-door saloon
- Layout: FR layout

Powertrain
- Engine: 1.8L M271 DE18LA Turbo I4
- Electric motor: 20 kW (27 hp) electric motor

The Mercedes-Benz F700 is a concept car produced by Mercedes-Benz in 2007. It was first revealed to the public at the 2007 Frankfurt Motor Show.

== DiesOtto engine ==
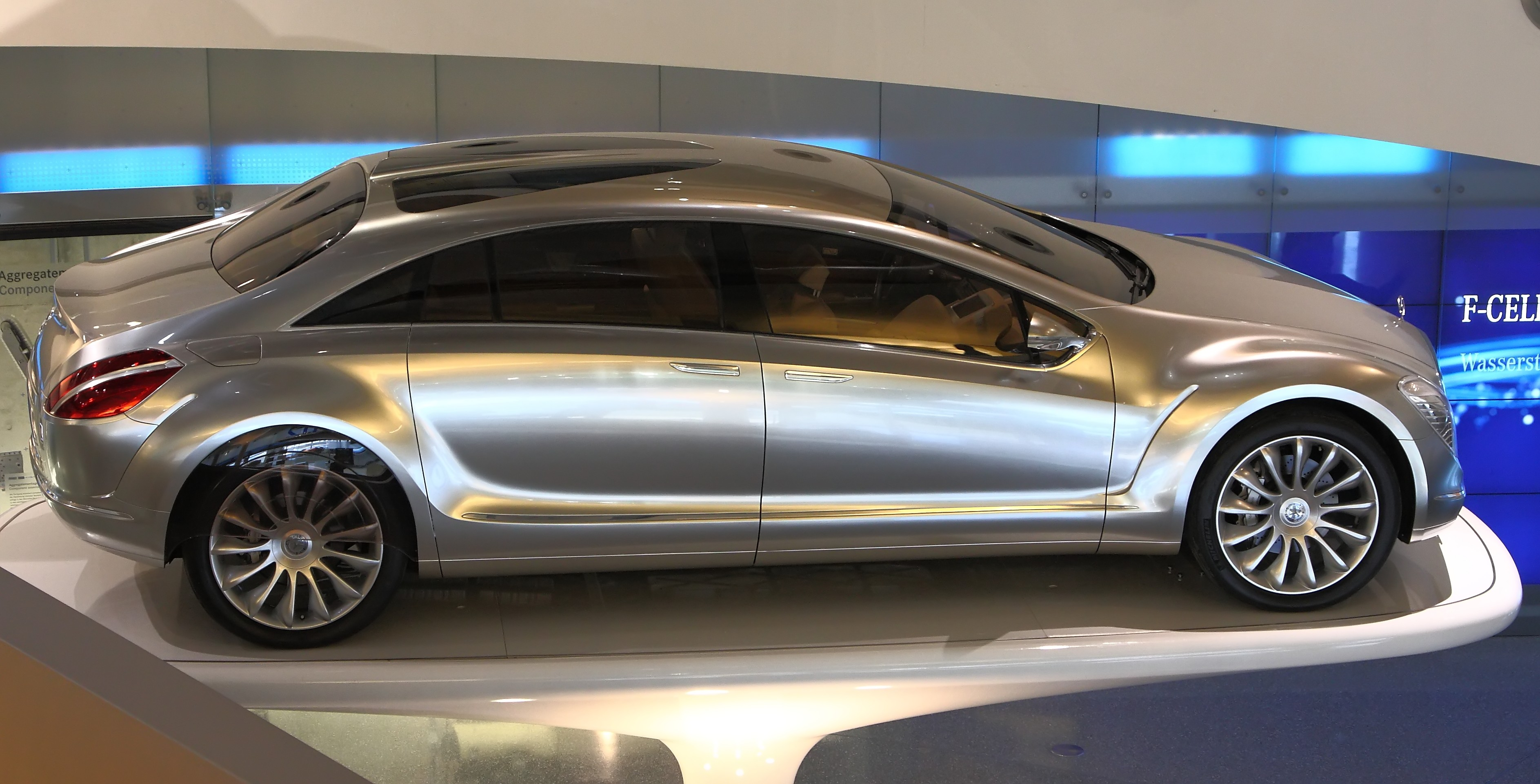
F700 side view

The F 700 used the newly developed DiesOtto engine. It is a twin turbocharged four-cylinder engine with a displacement of 1.8 liters, direct injection, variable compression, and an output of 175 kW (235 hp) and 400 N⋅m (295 lb⋅ft). The F 700 can accelerate from 0 to 100 km/h (62 mph) in 7.6 seconds. The top speed was limited to 200 km/h (124 mph).

The most important element of the new DiesOtto technology is the spatial ignition combustion at partial load. This is a very efficient combustion process, similar to that of a diesel engine, and is particularly advantageous at low and medium speeds. The air-fuel mixture ignites on its own. The F 700 starts like a conventional gasoline engine using a spark plug, which is also used under high loads. Exhaust gas purification is carried out by a standard three-way catalytic converter. The electric motor in the F 700 offers advantages, especially in urban driving, and provides an additional 15 kW for acceleration.

== Chassis ==
Video of the F700 at the 2007 IAA

Another new feature called Pre-Scan was used for the first time in the F 700. Two lidar laser scanners integrated into the headlights scan the road ahead of the vehicle and detect irregularities. The active suspension system, ABC (Active Body Control), processes the information from the road irregularities to enhance driving comfort. It was introduced in production under the name Magic Body Control in 2013 in the Mercedes-Benz Type 222.

== PRE-SCAN suspension ==
PRE-SCAN suspension was an upgrade of Active Body Control. Using PRE-SCAN suspension, the car not only reacts highly sensitively to uneven patches of road surface, but also acts in an anticipatory manner. PRE-SCAN uses two laser sensors in the headlamps as “eyes” that produce a precise picture of the road's condition. From this data, the control unit computes the parameters for the active suspension settings in order to provide the highest level of comfort.

PRE-SCAN was an early prototype of Magic Body Control (with Road Surface Scan), that was introduced in 2013 on the Mercedes-Benz S-Class (W222). The series version uses visual light twin optical stereo cameras instead of laser.
