= Michael Stelzer =

American judge (born 1964)

Michael F. Stelzer (born February 11, 1964, in St. Louis) is a circuit judge from Missouri. He attended Augustana College and Saint Louis University School of Law. Stelzer was appointed to the associate circuit bench in January 2004 by Missouri Governor Bob Holden.

Judge Stelzer made national news in 2019 in keeping Missouri's last abortion clinic open. This prevented Missouri from being the first state to not have an abortion clinic since Roe v. Wade was decided in 1973.
