= 1932 Monaco Grand Prix =

Coordinates: 43°44′4.74″N 7°25′16.8″E

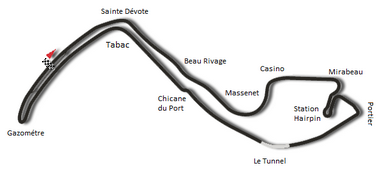

Race details
- Date: 17 April 1932
- Official name: IV Grand Prix de Monaco
- Location: Circuit de Monaco; Monte Carlo
- Course: Street circuit
- Course length: 3.180 km (1.976 miles)
- Distance: 100 laps, 318.0 km (197.6 miles)
- Weather: Overcast, dry

Pole position
Driver	(United Kingdom) William Grover-Williams	Bugatti
- Grid positions set by ballot

Fastest lap
Driver	(Italy) Achille Varzi	Bugatti
- Time: 2:02.0 on lap 19

Podium
First	(Italy) Tazio Nuvolari	Alfa Romeo
Second	(Germany) Rudolf Caracciola	Alfa Romeo
Third	(Italy) Luigi Fagioli	Maserati

The 1932 Monaco Grand Prix was a Grand Prix motor race held at the Circuit de Monaco on 17 April 1932. It was the fourth edition of the Monaco Grand Prix.

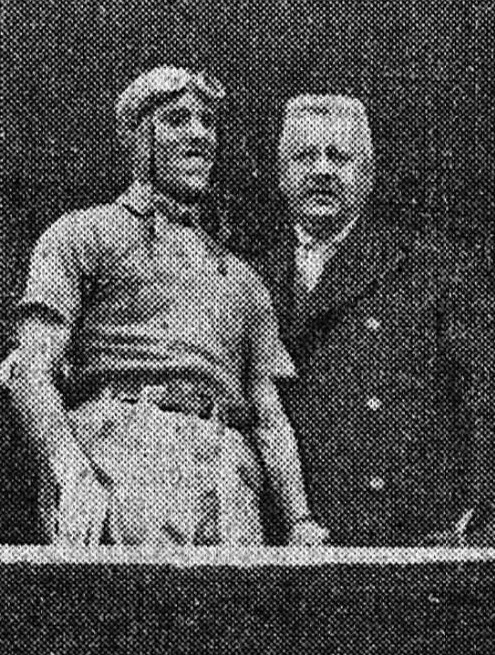
Winner Tazio Nuvolari with Louis II, Prince of Monaco.

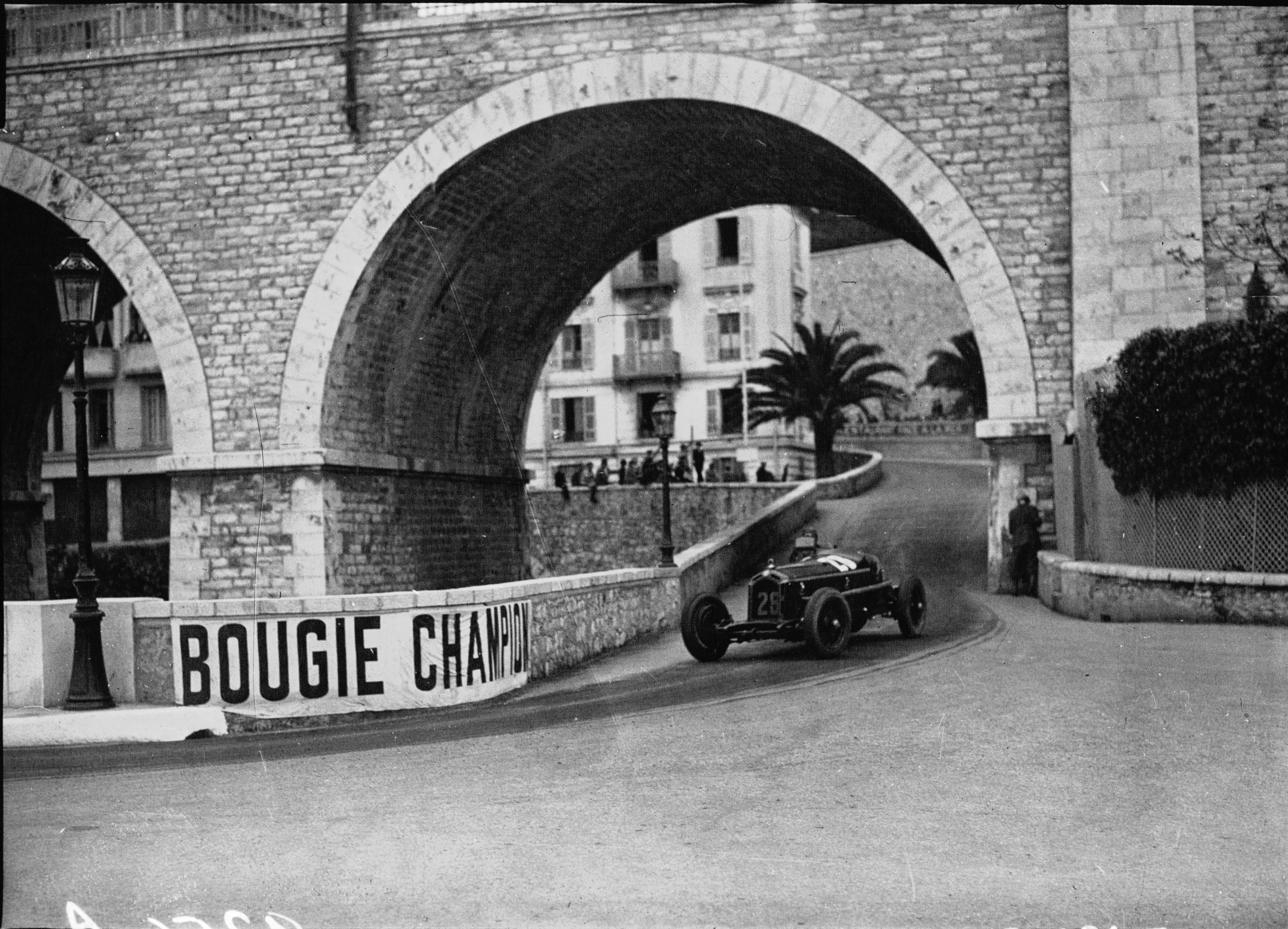
#28 is winner Nuvolario in his Alfa Romeo.

The race was won by Tazio Nuvolari of Italy, driving for the works Alfa Romeo team. He won by just 2.8 seconds from the privateer Alfa Romeo of Rudolf Caracciola, who, despite having a contract for 1932, was not yet part of the official works team. Caracciola might have had an opportunity to pass Nuvolari for the lead, after the Italian's car developed fuel pick-up issues, but he decided instead to remain behind the Alfa Romeo team leader. The 1931 Monaco Grand Prix runner-up Luigi Fagioli completed the podium in third for the Maserati team.

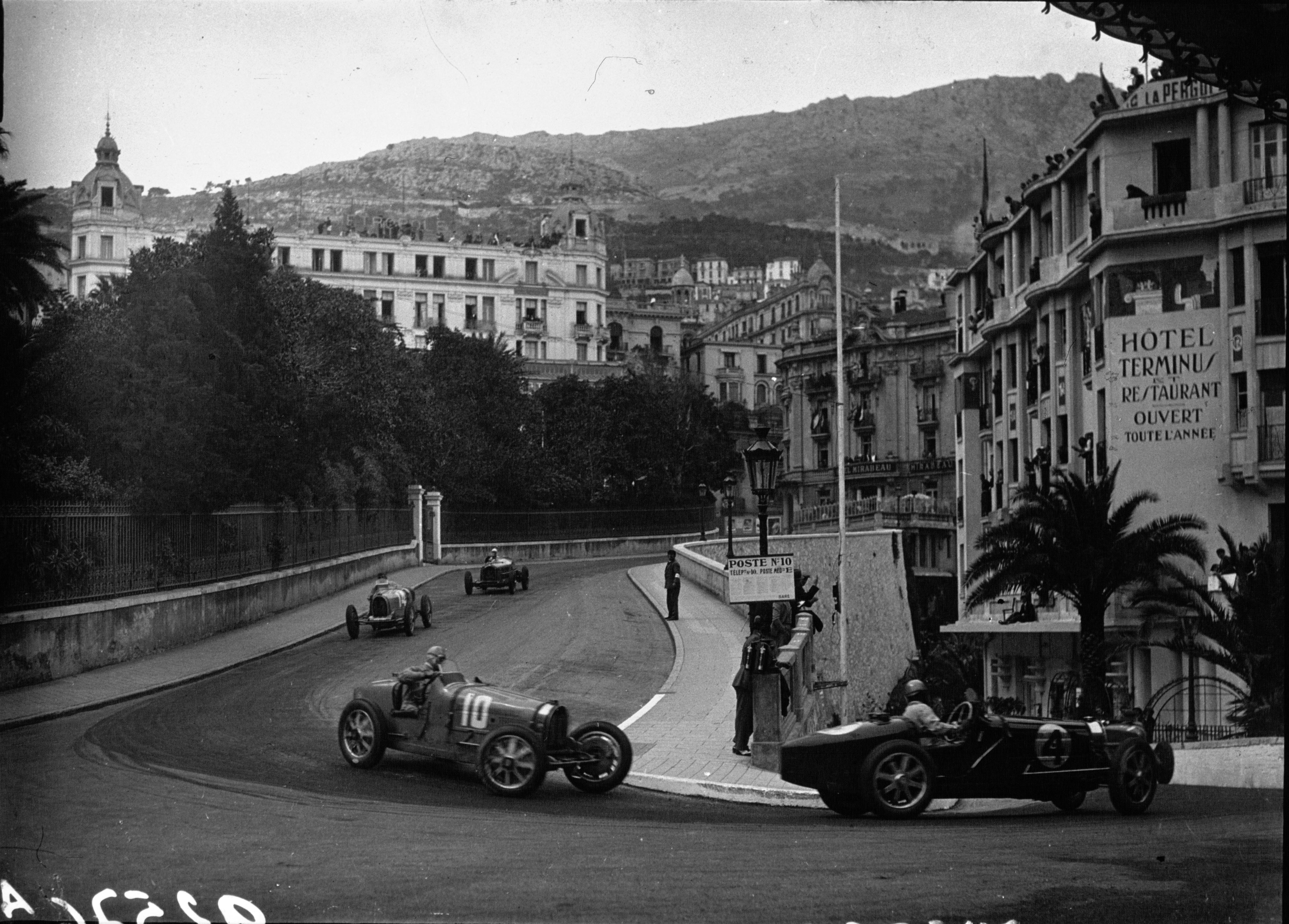
Entry #4 was Earl Howe, leading before #10 Guy Bouriat. Both in Bugattis.

== Entries ==
No	Driver	Entrant	Constructor	Chassis	Engine
2	(Germany) Rudolf Caracciola	Private entry	Alfa Romeo	Alfa Romeo Monza	2.3 L8
4	(United Kingdom) Earl Howe	Private entry	Bugatti	Bugatti T51	2.3 L8
6	(United Kingdom) Clifton Penn-Hughes	Private entry	Bugatti	Bugatti T35B	2.3 L8
8	(Chile) Juan Zanelli	Private entry	Nacional Pescara	Nacional Pescara	3.0 L6
10	(France) Guy Bouriat	Automobiles E. Bugatti	Bugatti	Bugatti T51	2.3 L8
12	(Monaco) Louis Chiron	Automobiles E. Bugatti	Bugatti	Bugatti T51	2.3 L8
14	(France) Albert Divo	Automobiles E. Bugatti	Bugatti	Bugatti T53^{‡} Bugatti T51	5.0 V16; 2.3 L8
16	(Italy) Achille Varzi	Automobiles E. Bugatti	Bugatti	Bugatti T51	2.3 L8
18	(Poland) Stanisłas Czaykowski	Private entry	Bugatti	Bugatti T51	2.3 L8
20	(France) Marcel Lehoux	Private entry	Bugatti	Bugatti T51	2.3 L8
22	(United Kingdom) William Grover-Williams	Private entry	Bugatti	Bugatti T51	2.3 L8
24	(Italy) Baconin Borzacchini	SA Alfa Romeo	Alfa Romeo	Alfa Romeo Monza	2.3 L8
26	(Italy) Giuseppe Campari	SA Alfa Romeo	Alfa Romeo	Alfa Romeo Monza	2.3 L8
28	(Italy) Tazio Nuvolari	SA Alfa Romeo	Alfa Romeo	Alfa Romeo Monza	2.3 L8
30	(France) Philippe Étancelin	Private entry	Alfa Romeo	Alfa Romeo Monza	2.3 L8
32	(Italy) Goffredo Zehender	Private entry	Alfa Romeo	Alfa Romeo Monza	2.3 L8
34	(France) René Dreyfus	Officine A. Maserati	Maserati	Maserati 8C 2800	2.8 L8
36	(Italy) Luigi Fagioli	Officine A. Maserati	Maserati	Maserati 8C 2800	2.8 L8
38	(Italy) Amedeo Ruggeri	Officine A. Maserati	Maserati	Maserati 26M	2.5 L8

^‡ — Divo drove the T53 during the practice sessions on Thursday and Friday, but switched to the T51 for Saturday practice and the race.

== Practice ==
Official timing for practice sessions was introduced for this year.

=== Thursday ===
Driver	Car	Time	Laps
(Italy) Giuseppe Campari	Alfa Romeo Monza	2:08	16
(Italy) Tazio Nuvolari	Alfa Romeo Monza	2:08	13
(France) René Dreyfus	Maserati 8C 2800	2:08	18
(France) Guy Bouriat	Bugatti T51	2:09	7
(Monaco) Louis Chiron	Bugatti T51	2:09	7
(Italy) Goffredo Zehender	Alfa Romeo Monza	2:10	11
(United Kingdom) Earl Howe	Bugatti T51	2:11	6
(Italy) Baconin Borzacchini	Alfa Romeo Monza	2:11	10
(France) Philippe Étancelin	Alfa Romeo Monza	2:12	15
(Germany) Rudolf Caracciola	Alfa Romeo Monza	2:14	14
(France) Albert Divo	Bugatti T53	2:18	7
(Poland) Stanisłas Czaykowski	Bugatti T51	2:19	6
(France) Marcel Lehoux	Bugatti T51	—	4
(United Kingdom) Clifton Penn-Hughes	Bugatti T35B	—	?

=== Friday ===
Driver	Car	Time	Laps
(Italy) Baconin Borzacchini	Alfa Romeo Monza	2:05	22
(Italy) Achille Varzi	Bugatti T51	2:06	14
(France) Philippe Étancelin	Alfa Romeo Monza	2:06	22
(France) René Dreyfus	Maserati 8C 2800	2:06	14
(Italy) Luigi Fagioli	Maserati 8C 2800	2:06	9
(Germany) Rudolf Caracciola	Alfa Romeo Monza	2:07	13
(Monaco) Louis Chiron	Bugatti T51	2:07	18
(France) Marcel Lehoux	Bugatti T51	2:07	9
(United Kingdom) William Grover-Williams	Bugatti T51	2:07	19
(Italy) Tazio Nuvolari	Alfa Romeo Monza	2:07	18
(Italy) Giuseppe Campari	Alfa Romeo Monza	2:09	11
(United Kingdom) Earl Howe	Bugatti T51	2:10	7
(France) Guy Bouriat	Bugatti T51	2:10	13
(Poland) Stanisłas Czaykowski	Bugatti T51	2:11	17
(Italy) Goffredo Zehender	Alfa Romeo Monza	2:15	9
(France) Albert Divo	Bugatti T53	2:19	6
(Chile) Juan Zanelli	Nacional Pescara	2:29	8

=== Saturday ===
Driver	Car	Time	Laps
(Monaco) Louis Chiron	Bugatti T51	2:04	22
(Italy) Giuseppe Campari	Alfa Romeo Monza	2:05	12
(Italy) Achille Varzi	Bugatti T51	2:06	9
(Italy) Tazio Nuvolari	Alfa Romeo Monza	2:07	9
(Germany) Rudolf Caracciola	Alfa Romeo Monza	2:07	13
(France) Marcel Lehoux	Bugatti T51	2:07	5
(United Kingdom) William Grover-Williams	Bugatti T51	2:07	13
(Italy) Baconin Borzacchini	Alfa Romeo Monza	2:07	11
(Italy) Goffredo Zehender	Alfa Romeo Monza	2:07	15
(Italy) Luigi Fagioli	Maserati 8C 2800	2:08	16
(Italy) Amedeo Ruggeri	Maserati 26M	2:08	16
(France) Guy Bouriat	Bugatti T51	2:10	23
(France) Albert Divo	Bugatti T51	2:11	13
(Poland) Stanisłas Czaykowski	Bugatti T51	2:11	11
(Chile) Juan Zanelli	Nacional Pescara	2:17	13

== Starting grid ==
Although practice laps had been officially timed, the grid was still determined by ballot.

Starting grid — 1932 Monaco Grand Prix
		(United Kingdom) Grover-Williams; Bugatti
	(France) Étancelin; Alfa Romeo	(United Kingdom) Grover-Williams; Bugatti
(Italy) Ruggeri; Maserati	(France) Étancelin; Alfa Romeo	
		(Monaco) Chiron; Bugatti
	(Italy) Campari; Alfa Romeo	(Monaco) Chiron; Bugatti
(Poland) Czaykowski; Bugatti	(Italy) Campari; Alfa Romeo	
		(France) Lehoux; Bugatti
	(Italy) Borzacchini; Alfa Romeo	(France) Lehoux; Bugatti
(France) Dreyfus; Maserati	(Italy) Borzacchini; Alfa Romeo	
		(France) Bouriat; Bugatti
	(Italy) Nuvolari; Alfa Romeo	(France) Bouriat; Bugatti
		(Italy) Varzi; Bugatti
	(Germany) Caracciola; Alfa Romeo	(Italy) Varzi; Bugatti
(United Kingdom) Howe; Bugatti	(Germany) Caracciola; Alfa Romeo	
		(France) Divo; Bugatti
	(Italy) Zehender; Alfa Romeo	(France) Divo; Bugatti
(Italy) Fagioli; Maserati	(Italy) Zehender; Alfa Romeo	

== Classification ==
=== Race ===
Pos	No	Driver	Car	Laps	Time/Retired	Grid
1	28	(Italy) Tazio Nuvolari	Alfa Romeo Monza	100	3:32:25.2	11
2	2	(Germany) Rudolf Caracciola	Alfa Romeo Monza	100	+2.8	13
3	36	(Italy) Luigi Fagioli	Maserati 8C 2800	100	+2:17.8	17
4	4	(United Kingdom) Earl Howe	Bugatti T51	98	+2 laps	14
5	32	(Italy) Goffredo Zehender	Alfa Romeo Monza	96	+4 laps	16
6	20	(France) Marcel Lehoux	Bugatti T51	95	+5 laps	7
7	22	(United Kingdom) William Grover-Williams	Bugatti T51	95	+5 laps	1
8	10	(France) Guy Bouriat	Bugatti T51	93	+7 laps	10
9	14	(France) Albert Divo	Bugatti T51	91	+9 laps	15
10	26	(Italy) Giuseppe Campari	Alfa Romeo Monza	86	+14 laps	5
Ret	24	(Italy) Baconin Borzacchini	Alfa Romeo Monza	85	Brakes	8
Ret	34	(France) René Dreyfus	Maserati 8C 2800	57	Broken driveshaft, lost wheel	9
Ret	16	(Italy) Achille Varzi	Bugatti T51	56	Rear axle	12
Ret	30	(France) Philippe Étancelin	Alfa Romeo Monza	49	Gearbox	2
Ret	18	(Poland) Stanisłas Czaykowski	Bugatti T51	49	Gearbox	6
Ret	12	(Monaco) Louis Chiron	Bugatti T51	29	Crash	4
Ret	38	(Italy) Amedeo Ruggeri	Maserati 26M	12	Supercharger	3
DNS	6	(United Kingdom) Clifton Penn-Hughes	Bugatti T35B		Practice crash, injury	
DNS	8	(Chile) Juan Zanelli	Nacional Pescara		Broken spring	

Grand Prix Race
1932 Grand Prix season
Previous race: 1931 Monaco Grand Prix	Monaco Grand Prix	Next race: 1933 Monaco Grand Prix
