= 1933 Penya Rhin Grand Prix =

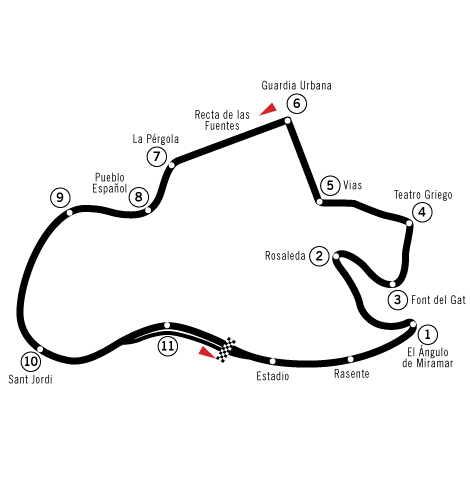

Race details
- Date: 25 June 1933
- Official name: IV Gran Premio de Penya Rhin
- Location: Barcelona, Catalonia, Spain
- Course: Montjuïc Circuit
- Course length: 3.790 km (2.355 miles)
- Distance: 40 laps, 151.6 km (94.2 miles)

Pole position
Driver	(Spain) Esteban Tort	Nacional Pescara
- Grid positions set by car number

Fastest lap
Driver	(Italy) Tazio Nuvolari	Bugatti
- Time: 2:13.1

Podium
First	(Chile) Juan Zanelli	Alfa Romeo
Second	(Portugal) Vasco Sameiro	Alfa Romeo
Third	(France) Marcel Lehoux	Bugatti

The 1933 Penya Rhin Grand Prix was a Grand Prix motor race held at the Montjuïc Circuit close to Barcelona in Catalonia, Spain, on 25 June 1933.

== Classification ==
Pos	No	Driver	Car	Laps	Time/retired
1	16	(Chile) Juan Zanelli	Alfa Romeo 8C-2300	40	1:35:38.3
2	18	(Portugal) Vasco Sameiro	Alfa Romeo 8C-2300	40	1:37:24.0
3	4	(France) Marcel Lehoux	Bugatti T51	40	1:38:34.2
4	10	(Spain) Joaquin Palacio	Bugatti T35	40	1:39:34.2
5	8	(Italy) Tazio Nuvolari	Alfa Romeo 8C-2300	38	
6	24	(Czechoslovakia) Edgard de Morawitz	Bugatti T51	36	
7	12	(Spain) José Texidor	Bugatti T35B	36	
8	32	(France) Emil Dourel	Amilcar C6	36	
Ret	6	(France) Jean-Pierre Wimille	Alfa Romeo 8C-2300	32	Ignition
Ret	20	(Spain) "Vega"	Bugatti T35	22	Carburettor
Ret	28	(Switzerland) Oscar Stahel	Bugatti T35	18	
Ret	30	(Spain) Luis Angli	Bugatti T35B	10	
Ret	2	(Spain) Esteban Tort	Nacional Pescara	7	Engine
DNS	14	(Poland) Henryk Lehrsfield	Bugatti T35C		
DNS	22	(France) Guy Moll	Alfa Romeo 8C-2300		
DNS	26	(Poland) Stanislas Czaykowski	Bugatti T54		

- Fastest Lap: Tazio Nuvolari, 2m13.1 102.51 km/h (63.70 mph)

Grand Prix Race
1933 Grand Prix season
Previous race: 1923 Penya Rhin Grand Prix	Penya Rhin Grand Prix	Next race: 1934 Penya Rhin Grand Prix
