= 1931 Monaco Grand Prix =

Coordinates: 43°44′4.74″N 7°25′16.8″E

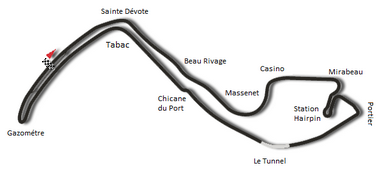

Race details
- Date: 19 April 1931
- Official name: III Grand Prix de Monaco
- Location: Circuit de Monaco; Monte Carlo
- Course: Street circuit
- Course length: 3.180 km (1.976 miles)
- Distance: 100 laps, 318.0 km (197.6 miles)
- Weather: Sunny

Pole position
Driver	(France) René Dreyfus	Maserati

Fastest lap
Drivers	(Monaco) Louis Chiron	Bugatti
	(Italy) Luigi Fagioli	Maserati
	(Italy) Achille Varzi	Bugatti
- Time: 2:07

Podium
First	(Monaco) Louis Chiron	Bugatti
Second	(Italy) Luigi Fagioli	Maserati
Third	(Italy) Achille Varzi	Bugatti

The 1931 Monaco Grand Prix was a Grand Prix motor race held at the Circuit de Monaco on 19 April 1931.

With 16 Bugattis in a field of 23 cars, the event was close to being a single-make race. Among the 16 were four factory-team Type 51s driven by the Monegasque Louis Chiron, the Italian Achille Varzi and the French Albert Divo and Guy Bouriat. The real challenge came from the Maserati 8C 2500's driven by René Dreyfus, the Italian Luigi Fagioli and Clemente Bondietti. Rudolf Caracciola with his huge Mercedes SSKL (Super Sport Short Light-Weight) was uncompetitive as his larger car performed poorly around the tight Monaco track.

The race was between the blue cars from Molsheim and the red ones from Modena. When the start flag dropped it was Rene Dreyfus in his red Maserati who led into St. Devote, only to be passed by 'Williams' on the hill to the Casino, but his lead was short-lived as the Brit was sidelined by a broken valve spring, and his race was over. Achille Varzi and Caracciola started closing on Dreyfus and Varzi managed to overtake the Frenchman on the 7th lap. Caracciola struggled with a slipping clutch that gave in on lap 53.

Starting slowly, Louis Chiron eventually displayed his talents; gaining back ground with a new lap record time. He caught up with all his opponents and left them behind. Chiron, a native of Monaco, finished the race some 5 minutes ahead of Luigi Fagioli.

Jean Bugatti could not control his joy and jumped over the parapet of the bleachers and fell into Louis Chiron's arms. For the Monegasque, this Monaco Grand Prix victory confirmed his reputation.

Louis Chiron's victory at Monaco would be the last for a Monegasque for 93 years until Charles Leclerc won the 81st edition of the event.

== Entries ==
No	Driver	Entrant	Constructor	Chassis	Engine
2	(Germany) Ernst-Günther Burggaller	German Bugatti Team	Bugatti	Bugatti T35B	2.3 L8
4	(Germany) Hermann zu Leiningen	German Bugatti Team	Bugatti	Bugatti T35C	2.0 L8
6	(Germany) Heinrich-Joachim von Morgen	German Bugatti Team	Bugatti	Bugatti T35B	2.3 L8
8	(Germany) Rudolf Caracciola	Private entry	Mercedes-Benz	Mercedes-Benz SSKL	7.1 L6
10	(United Kingdom) Earl Howe	Private entry	Bugatti	Bugatti T51	2.3 L8
12	(United Kingdom) Clifton Penn-Hughes	Private entry	Bugatti	Bugatti T35	2.0 L8
14	(United Kingdom) Henry Birkin	Private entry	Maserati	Maserati 26M	2.5 L8
16	(Austria) Bernhard Ackerl	Private entry	Bugatti	Bugatti T37	1.5 L4
18	(Chile) Juan Zanelli	Private entry	Bugatti	Bugatti T35B	2.3 L8
20	(France) Guy Bouriat	Automobiles Ettore Bugatti	Bugatti	Bugatti T51	2.3 L8
22	(Monaco) Louis Chiron	Automobiles Ettore Bugatti	Bugatti	Bugatti T51	2.3 L8
24	(France) Albert Divo	Automobiles Ettore Bugatti	Bugatti	Bugatti T51	2.3 L8
26	(Italy) Achille Varzi	Automobiles Ettore Bugatti	Bugatti	Bugatti T51	2.3 L8
28	(France) Philippe Étancelin	Private entry	Bugatti	Bugatti T35C	2.0 L8
30	(Poland) Stanisław Czaykowski	Private entry	Bugatti	Bugatti T35B	2.3 L8
32	(France) Marcel Lehoux	Private entry	Bugatti	Bugatti T35B	2.3 L8
34	(United Kingdom) William Grover-Williams	Private entry	Bugatti	Bugatti T35C	2.0 L8
36	(Russia) Boris Ivanowski	Private entry	Mercedes-Benz	Mercedes-Benz SSK	7.1 L6
38	(France) André Boillot	Private entry	Peugeot	Peugeot 174S	4.0 L4
40	(Italy) Luigi Arcangeli	SA Alfa Romeo	Alfa Romeo	Alfa Romeo 6C-1750	1.8 L6
42	(Italy) Baconin Borzacchini	SA Alfa Romeo	Alfa Romeo	Alfa Romeo 6C-1750	1.8 L6
44	(Italy) Tazio Nuvolari	SA Alfa Romeo	Alfa Romeo	Alfa Romeo 8C-2300	2.3 L8
46	(Italy) Goffredo Zehender	Scuderia Ferrari	Alfa Romeo	Alfa Romeo 6C-1750 GS	1.8 L6
48	(Italy) Clemente Biondetti	Officine A. Maserati	Maserati	Maserati 26M	2.5 L8
50	(France) René Dreyfus	Officine A. Maserati	Maserati	Maserati 26M	2.5 L8
52	(Italy) Luigi Fagioli	Officine A. Maserati	Maserati	Maserati 26M	2.5 L8
54	(Switzerland) Carlo Pedrazzini	Private entry	Maserati	Maserati 26B	2.0 L8
56	(Switzerland) Hans Stuber	Private entry	Bugatti	Bugatti T35C	2.0 L8

== Starting grid ==
Starting grid — 1931 Monaco Grand Prix
		(France) Dreyfus; Maserati
	(Switzerland) Stuber; Bugatti	(France) Dreyfus; Maserati
(Germany) Ackerl; Bugatti	(Switzerland) Stuber; Bugatti	
		(United Kingdom) Grover-Williams; Bugatti
	(Germany) Caracciola; Mercedes-Benz	(United Kingdom) Grover-Williams; Bugatti
(France) Divo; Bugatti	(Germany) Caracciola; Mercedes-Benz	
		(France) Lehoux; Bugatti
	(France) Boillot; Peugeot	(France) Lehoux; Bugatti
(Italy) Biondetti; Maserati	(France) Boillot; Peugeot	
		(Italy) Varzi; Bugatti
	(Monaco) Chiron; Bugatti	(Italy) Varzi; Bugatti
(Germany) von Morgen; Bugatti	(Monaco) Chiron; Bugatti	
		(Italy) Zehender; Alfa Romeo
	(Italy) Fagioli; Maserati	(Italy) Zehender; Alfa Romeo
(United Kingdom) Penn-Hughes; Bugatti	(Italy) Fagioli; Maserati	
		(France) Étancelin; Bugatti
	(United Kingdom) Howe; Bugatti	(France) Étancelin; Bugatti
(Germany) Burggaller; Bugatti	(United Kingdom) Howe; Bugatti	
		(Chile) Zanelli; Bugatti
	(France) Bouriat; Bugatti	(Chile) Zanelli; Bugatti
(Poland) Czaykowski; Bugatti	(France) Bouriat; Bugatti	
		(Germany) zu Leiningen; Bugatti
	(Switzerland) Pedrazzini; Maserati	(Germany) zu Leiningen; Bugatti

Note: grid slots were determined by drawing lots (Birkin and Ivanowski had provisionally been due to start on the first and seventh row, respectively).

== Classification ==
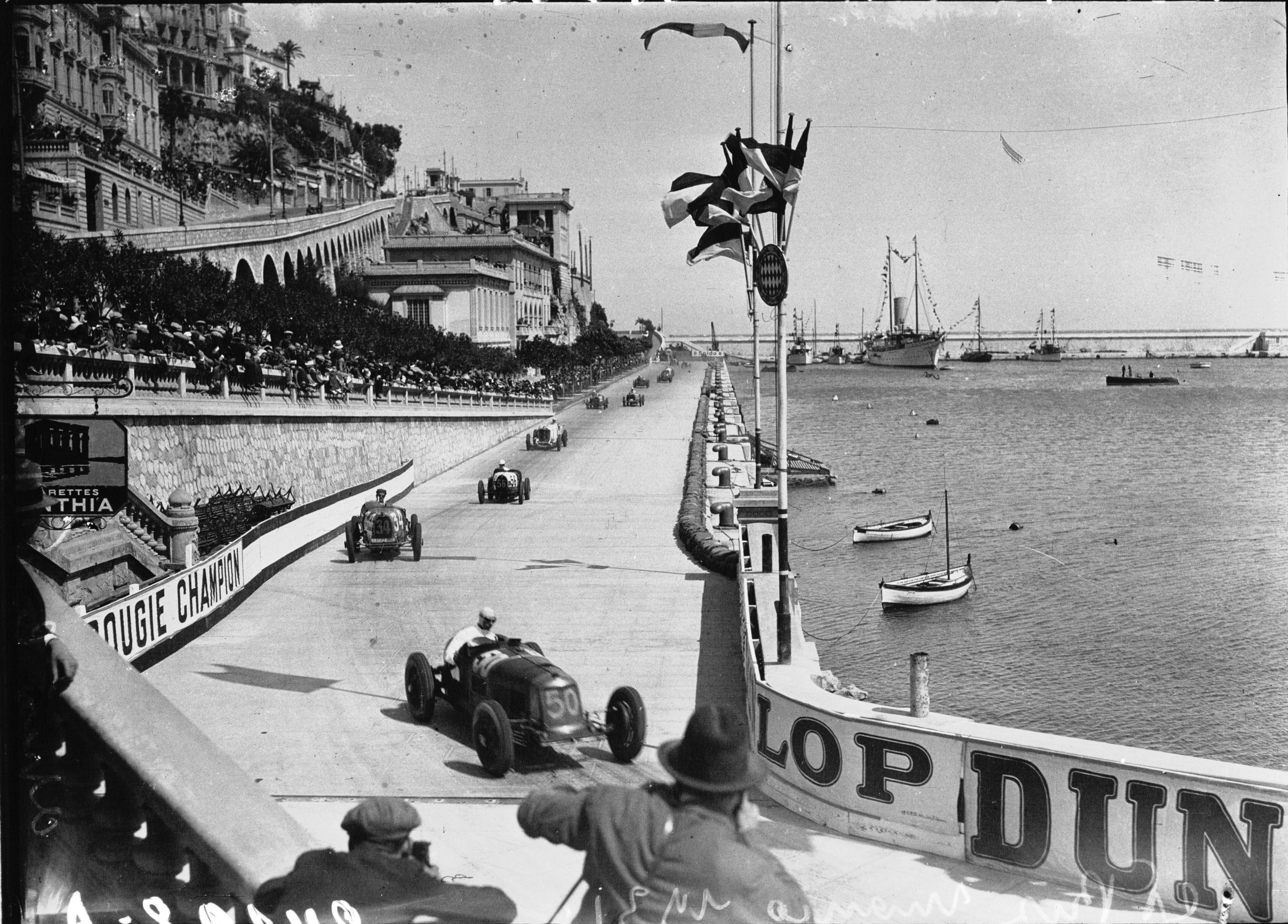
Soon after the start

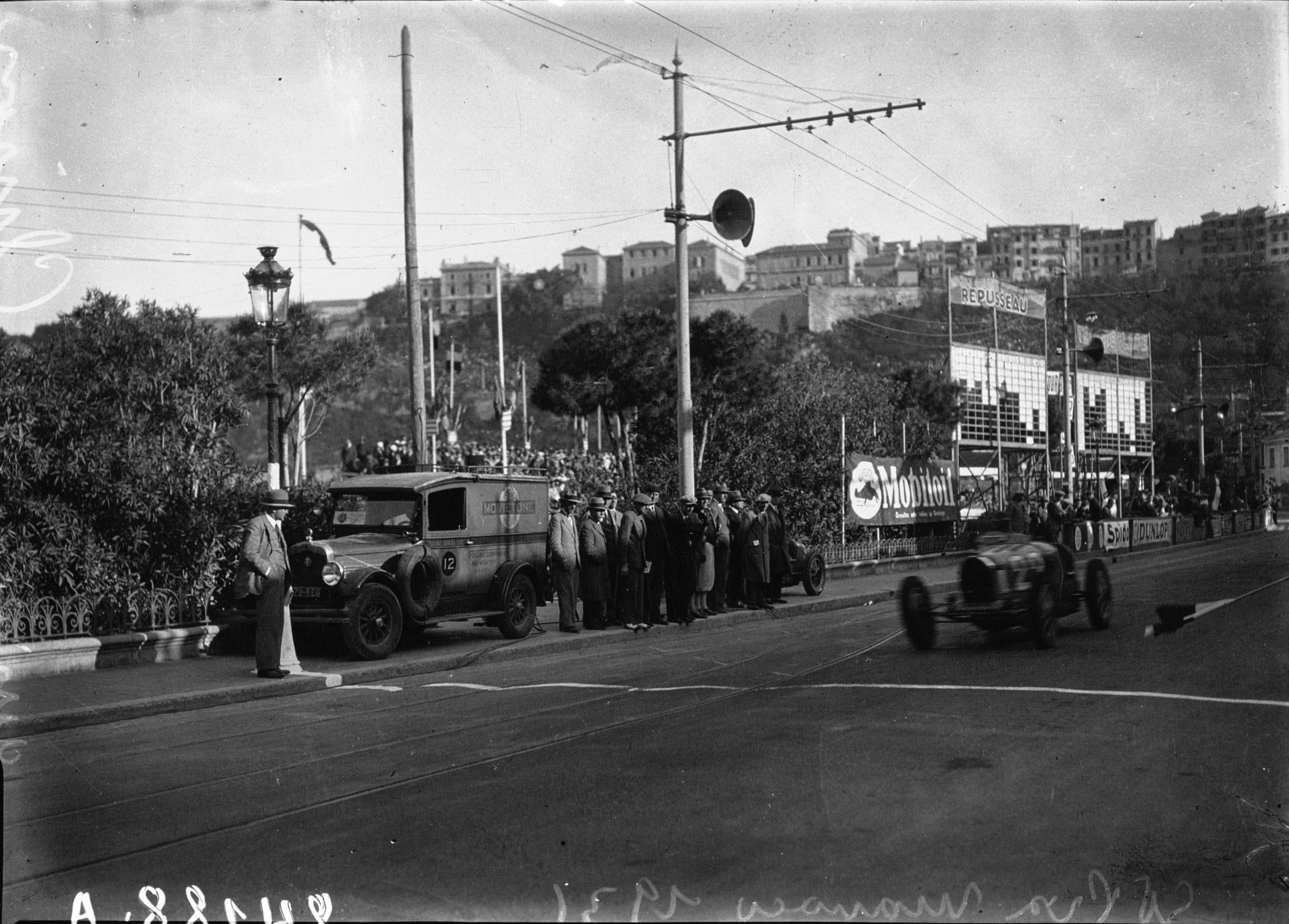
Louis Chiron winning

=== Race ===
Pos	No	Driver	Car	Laps	Time/Retired	Grid
1	22	(Monaco) Louis Chiron	Bugatti T51	100	3:39:09.2	11
2	52	(Italy) Luigi Fagioli	Maserati 26M	100	+3:55.4	14
3	26	(Italy) Achille Varzi	Bugatti T51	100	+4:04.0	10
4	20	(France) Guy Bouriat	Bugatti T51	98	+2 laps	20
5	46	(Italy) Goffredo Zehender	Alfa Romeo 6C-1750 GS	97	+3 laps	13
6	38	(France) André Boillot	Peugeot 174S	96	+4 laps	8
Ret	50	(France) René Dreyfus	Maserati 26M	91	Magneto	1
7	48	(Italy) Clemente Biondetti	Maserati 26M	91	+9 laps	9
8	12	(United Kingdom) Clifton Penn-Hughes	Bugatti T35	89	+11 laps	15
9	30	(Poland) Stanislas Czaykowski	Bugatti T35B	85	+15 laps	21
Ret	24	(France) Albert Divo	Bugatti T51	66	Engine	6
Ret	10	(United Kingdom) Earl Howe	Bugatti T51	62	Oil pipe/engine	17
Ret	56	(Switzerland) Hans Stuber	Bugatti T35C	59	Drive shaft	2
Ret	16	(Germany) Bernhard Ackerl	Bugatti T37A	55	Transmission	3
Ret	8	(Germany) Rudolf Caracciola	Mercedes-Benz SSKL	53	Clutch/engine	5
Ret	18	(Chile) Juan Zanelli	Bugatti T35B	47	Piston	19
Ret	4	(Germany) Hermann zu Leiningen	Bugatti T35C	31	Gearbox	22
Ret	6	(Germany) Heinrich-Joachim von Morgen	Bugatti T35B	28	Transmission	12
Ret	2	(Germany) Ernst-Günther Burggaller	Bugatti T35B	26	Engine	18
Ret	32	(France) Marcel Lehoux	Bugatti T35B	15	Transmission	7
Ret	54	(Switzerland) Carlo Pedrazzini	Maserati 26B	13	Ignition	23
Ret	28	(France) Philippe Étancelin	Bugatti T35C	6	Piston	16
Ret	34	(United Kingdom) William Grover-Williams	Bugatti T35C	5	Valve	4
DNS	14	(United Kingdom) Henry Birkin	Maserati 26M			
DNS	36	(Russia) Boris Ivanowski	Mercedes-Benz SSK			
DNA	40	(Italy) Luigi Arcangeli	Alfa Romeo 6C-1750			
DNA	42	(Italy) Baconin Borzacchini	Alfa Romeo 6C-1750			
DNA	44	(Italy) Tazio Nuvolari	Alfa Romeo 8C-2300			

Grand Prix Race
1931 Grand Prix season
Previous race: 1930 Monaco Grand Prix	Monaco Grand Prix	Next race: 1932 Monaco Grand Prix
