= Pedralbes Circuit =

Street racing course in Barcelona, Spain

Circuito de Pedralbes
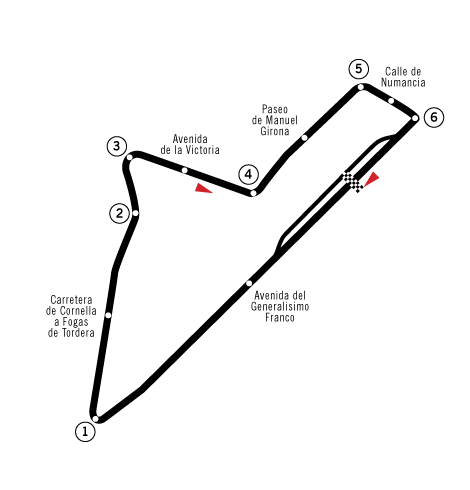
- Grand Prix Circuit (1954–1955)

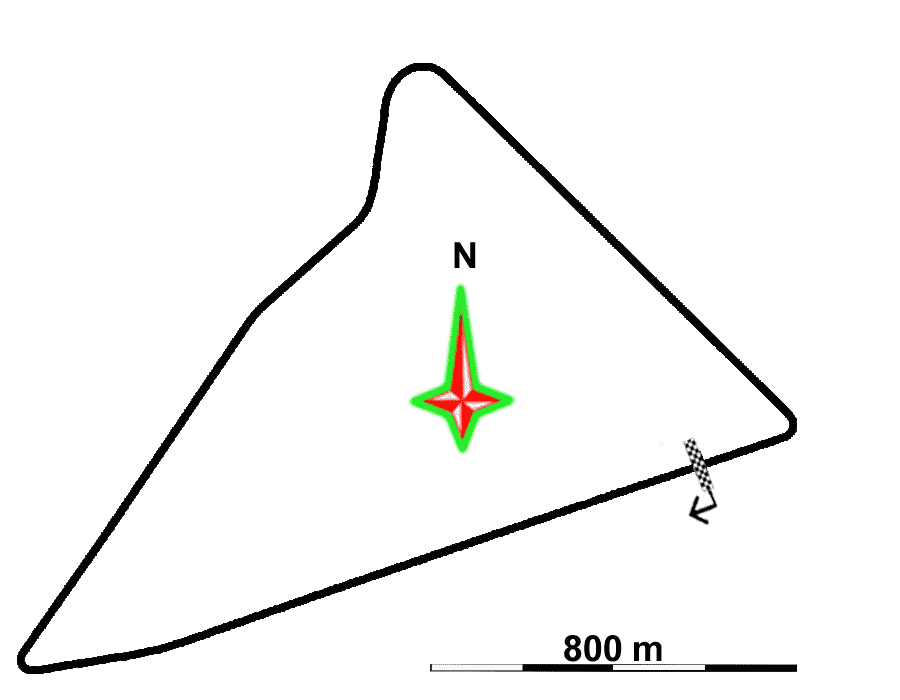
- Grand Prix Circuit (1946–1950)
- Location: Barcelona, Catalonia, Spain
- Coordinates: 41°23′25″N 2°7′0″E
- Opened: 1946
- Closed: 1955
- Major events: Formula One; Spanish Grand Prix (1951, 1954); Grand Prix motor racing Penya Rhin Grand Prix (1946, 1948, 1950, 1954)

Grand Prix Circuit (1954–1955)
- Length: 6.333 km (3.935 mi)
- Turns: 6
- Race lap record: 2:20.400 ( (Italy) Alberto Ascari, Lancia D50, 1954, F1)

Grand Prix Circuit (1951)
- Length: 6.316 km (3.925 mi)
- Turns: 6
- Race lap record: 2:16.930 ( (Argentina) Juan Manuel Fangio, Alfa Romeo 159, 1951, F1)

Grand Prix Circuit (1946–1950)
- Length: 4.465 km (2.774 mi)
- Turns: 4
- Race lap record: 1:46.000 ( (Italy) Luigi Villoresi, Maserati 8CL & Maserati 4CLT/48, 1946 & 1948, GP)

The Pedralbes Circuit (Spanish: Circuito de Pedralbes) was a 6.333 km (3.935 mi) street racing course in Barcelona, Catalonia, Spain.

First opened in 1946 in the western suburbs of the city, in the Pedralbes neighbourhood, the course featured wide streets and expansive, sweeping corners; both drivers and racing fans loved the course. The circuit hosted the Penya Rhin Grand Prix four times (1946, 1948, 1950 and 1954.). The circuit also hosted the Spanish Grand Prix in 1951 and 1954. Due to stricter safety rules following the 1955 Le Mans disaster, the Pedralbes Circuit was permanently retired as a racing venue.

== Lap records ==
The fastest official race lap records at the Pedralbes Circuit are listed as:

Category	Time	Driver	Vehicle	Event
Grand Prix Circuit (1954–1955): 6.333 km (3.935 mi)
Formula One	2:20.400	Alberto Ascari	Lancia D50	1954 Spanish Grand Prix
Sports car racing	2:30.200	Jean Behra	Gordini T24S	1954 Penya Rhin Grand Prix
Grand Prix Circuit (1951): 6.316 km (3.925 mi)
Formula One	2:16.930	Juan Manuel Fangio	Alfa Romeo 159	1951 Spanish Grand Prix
Original Circuit (1946–1950): 4.465 km (2.774 mi)
Grand Prix	1:46.000	Luigi Villoresi	Maserati 8CL (Note: The driver took the same lap time in both races.); Maserati 4CLT/48	1946 Penya Rhin Grand Prix; 1948 Penya Rhin Grand Prix
Formula One	2:24.200	Alberto Ascari	Ferrari 375 F1	1950 Penya Rhin Grand Prix
