= Bugatti Type 53 =

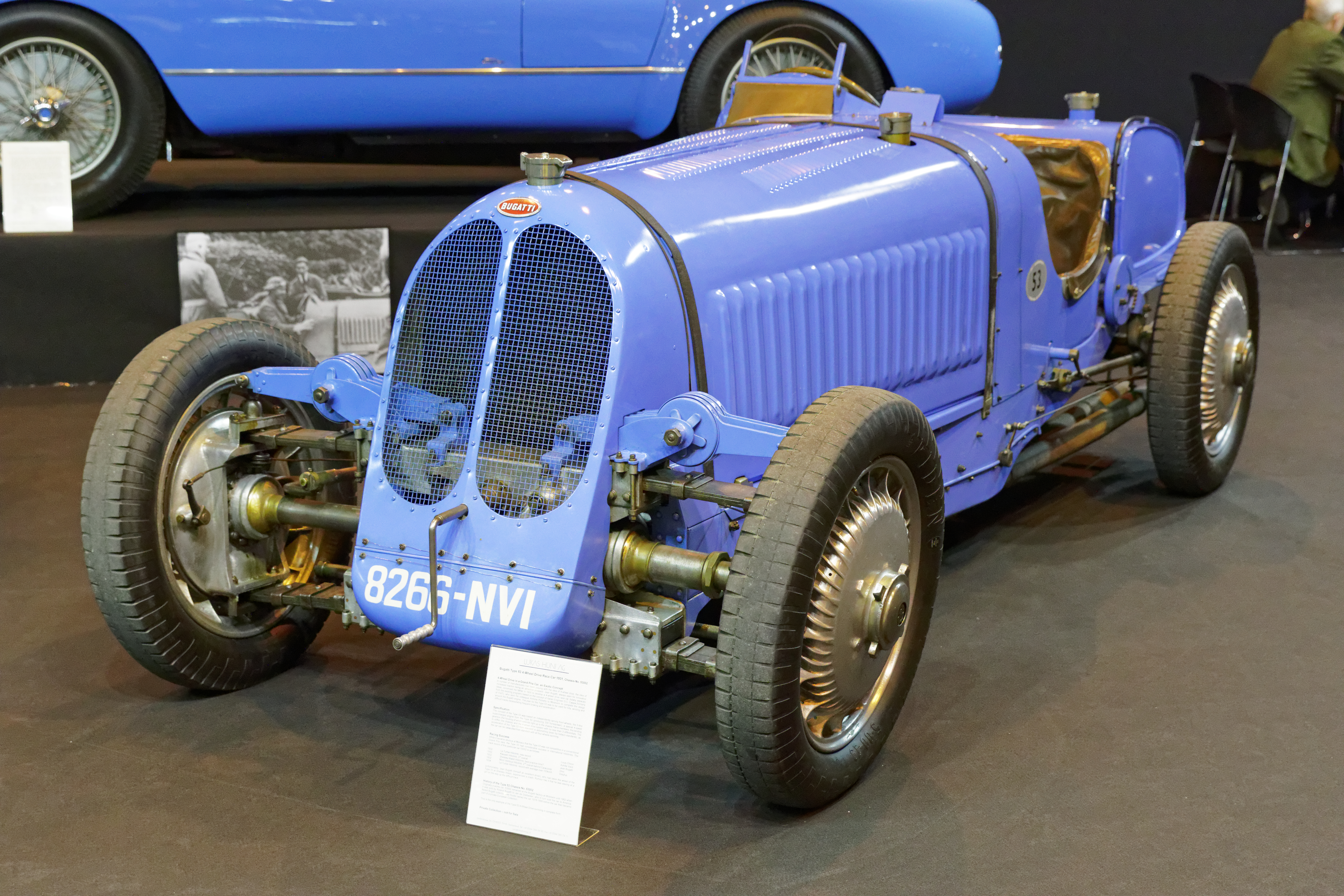
- Bugatti Type 53
- Category: Grand Prix motor racing Hillclimbing
- Constructor: Bugatti
- Designer(s): Antoine Pichetto

Technical specifications
- Suspension (front): Independent, upper and lower quarter-elliptic springs with friction dampers
- Suspension (rear): Live axle, quarter-elliptic springs
- Axle track: 49.2 in (125.0 cm)
- Wheelbase: 102.2 in (259.6 cm)
- Engine: Type 50 4,972 cc (303.4 cu in) Straight-eight engine Roots-type supercharger Front/mid engine, four-wheel drive
- Transmission: 4 forward speeds manual Centre, front, and rear
- Tyres: 28 x 5

Competition history
- Notable entrants: Bugatti
- Notable drivers: René Dreyfus; Robert Benoist; Louis Chiron; Achille Varzi; Jean Bugatti
- Debut: 1932 Monaco Grand Prix

The Bugatti Type 53 was a four-wheel drive racing car built by Bugatti in 1932. The Type 53 was one of the first racing cars to attempt to drive all four wheels, though Ettore Bugatti himself had designed multi-engine all wheel drive vehicles early in his career.

The Type 53 used the (4,972 cubic centimetres (303.4 cu in)) engine from the Type 50 road car fitted to the chassis of the Type 51 racer. It was originally conceived by Giulio Cappa, who created a front wheel drive Grand Prix car in 1926. Cappa's associate, Antonio Pichetto, handled the development of the car while working at Bugatti, starting in 1930. The engine output was approximately 300 horsepower (220 kW). As a result of the elaborate front drivetrain, the Type 53 used the only independent front suspension system ever approved for use by Ettore Bugatti.

The Type 53 was notoriously difficult to steer. At the Type 53's debut in the 1932 Monaco Grand Prix, Albert Divo, noted for his size and strength, was chosen to drive the car, but he gave up during practice after exhausting himself. In June 1932, Jean Bugatti rolled a Type 53 at the Shelsley Walsh Speed Hill Climb. The hard steering was attributed to not having constant-velocity joints for the front halfshafts and to unequal-length halfshafts without matching torsional characteristics. Modern tests, however, have shown the car to be quite tractable at speed.

René Dreyfus won the 1934 La Turbie hillclimb with a record average speed of 100 km/h (62 mph) in a Type 53. Robert Benoist then won the 1935 Chateau-Thierry hillclimb in a Type 53, after which the type was retired. Two or three were built.

== See also ==
- Bugatti Type 50
- Bugatti Type 51
