= Gordini T32 =

Formula One race car

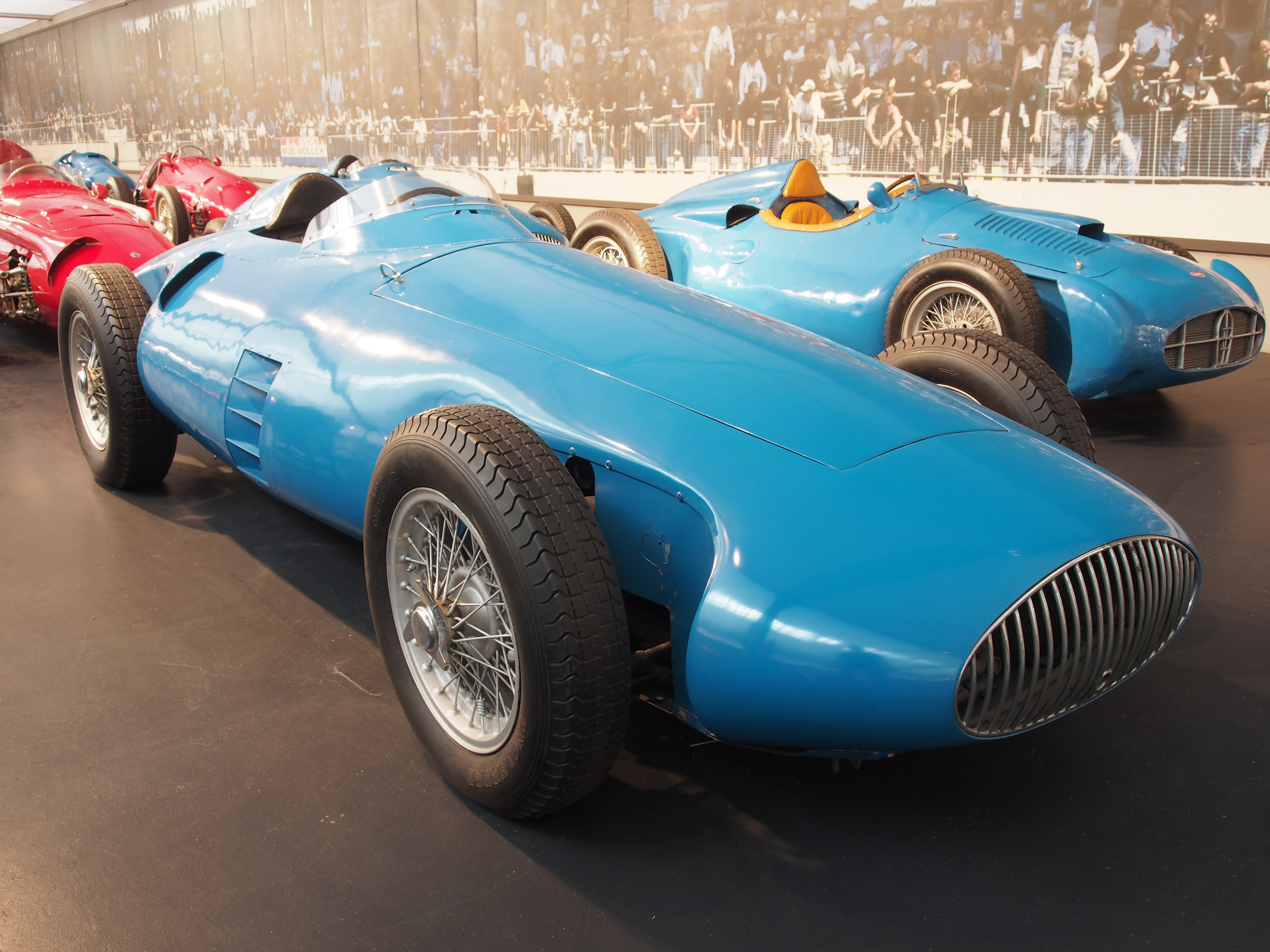
- Category: Formula One
- Constructor: Gordini
- Designer: Amédée Gordini

Technical specifications
- Chassis: Steel tubular spaceframe
- Suspension (front): Independent with torsion bar, hydraulic Messier dampers, anti-roll bar
- Suspension (rear): Rear rigid live axle, Watts linkage, Messier hydraulic dampers, anti-roll bar
- Axle track: 1,240 mm (48.8 in) (Front); 1,216 mm (47.9 in) (Rear)
- Wheelbase: 2,300 mm (90.6 in)
- Engine: 2.5 L (152.6 cu in) I8 DOHC naturally-aspirated mid-engined
- Transmission: 5-speed manual
- Power: 250 hp (190 kW) at 7500 rpm
- Weight: 700 kg (1,543 lb)
- Brakes: Disc brakes

Competition history
- Debut: 1955 Italian Grand Prix

The Gordini T32 was an open-wheel formula racing car, designed, developed and built by French manufacturer Gordini, for the 1955 and 1957 Formula One World Championship seasons.

== Background ==
In 1955, Gordini presented a completely new Formula 1 racing car. The T32 was unveiled at the Montlhéry circuit. While Gordini had retained the ladder-type frame construction, the T32 had independent wheel suspension and disc brakes. The eight-cylinder in-line engine had a displacement of 2.5 liters and delivered 250 hp.

However, the car was too heavy and the two copies built were inferior to the competition. Another problem was the cooling of the internal rear brakes. This was remedied by air slots in the body.

Élie Bayol and André Pilette scored the best result for the T32 at the 1956 Monaco Grand Prix, where they shared sixth place.
