= Amedeo Ruggeri =

Italian racing driver (1889 – 1932)

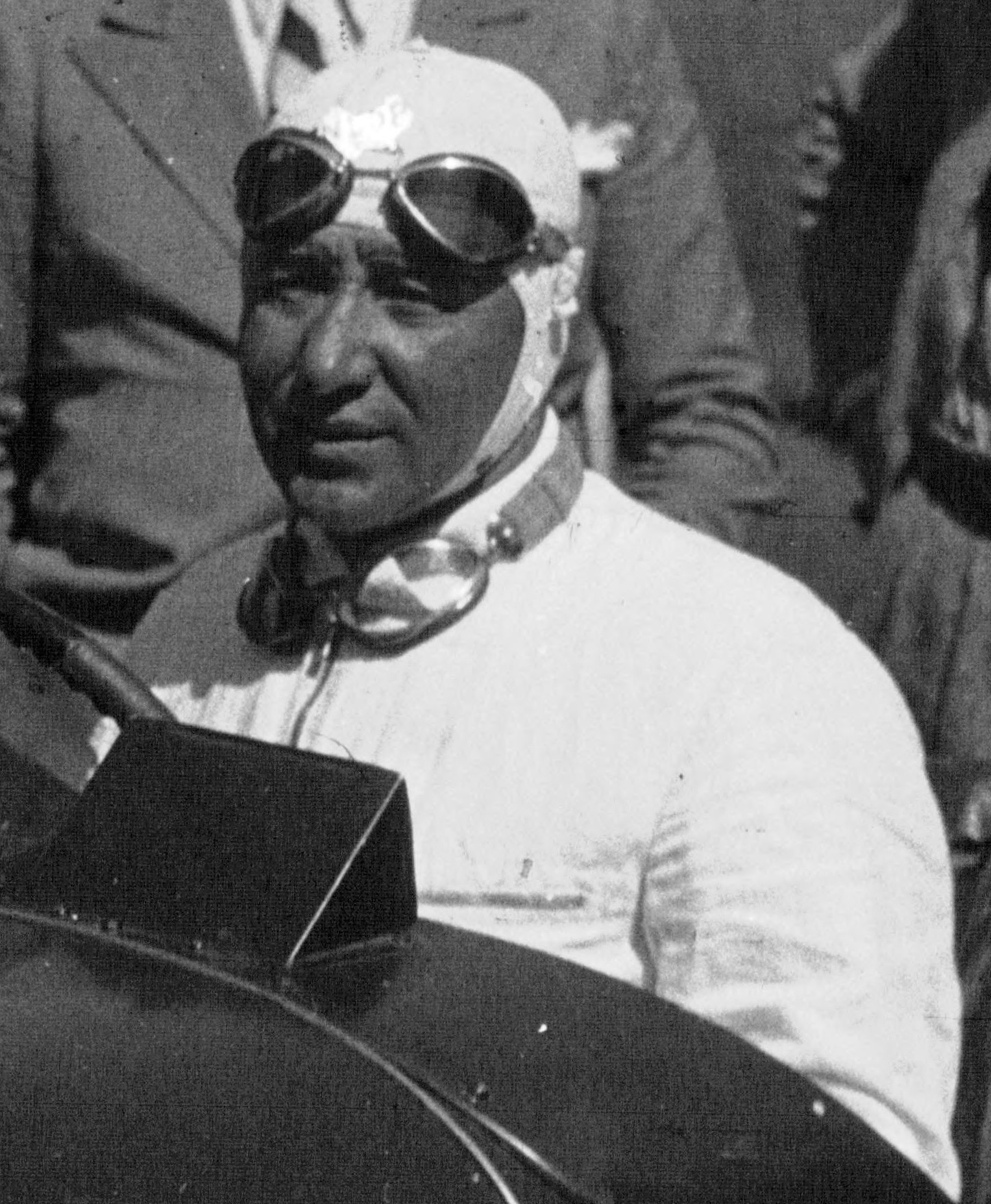
- At the 1932 Targa Florio
- Born: Amedeo Alfredo Augusto Ruggeri; 14 June 1889 Bologna, Italy
- Died: 7 December 1932 (aged 43) Montlhéry, France

Amedeo Alfredo Augusto Ruggeri (14 June 1889 – 7 December 1932) was an Italian racing motorcyclist and Grand Prix driver.

== Career ==
=== Motorcycles ===
Ruggeri served in the Italian forces in the First World War as a reconnaissance pilot, and began racing motorcycles in 1920. He won the Circuito del Lario in 1921, and in 1922 won Gran Premio di Monza, the first Italian Tourist Trophy, and the Gran Fondo Milano-Roma-Napoli, an open-road run from Milan to Naples, all on a 1000cc Harley-Davidson.

In 1923 he won the Italian championship in the 1000cc class on an Indian, one of his team-mates being the Grand Prix driver Biagio Nazzaro. In the half-litre class, Ruggeri won the Circuito del Lario and the Giro d'Italia in 1925 on a Moto Guzzi, was second in the 250cc European Grand Prix on a Garanzini GD, and even won the 125cc class at the 1925 German Grand Prix at the Avus on the same marque.

=== Cars ===
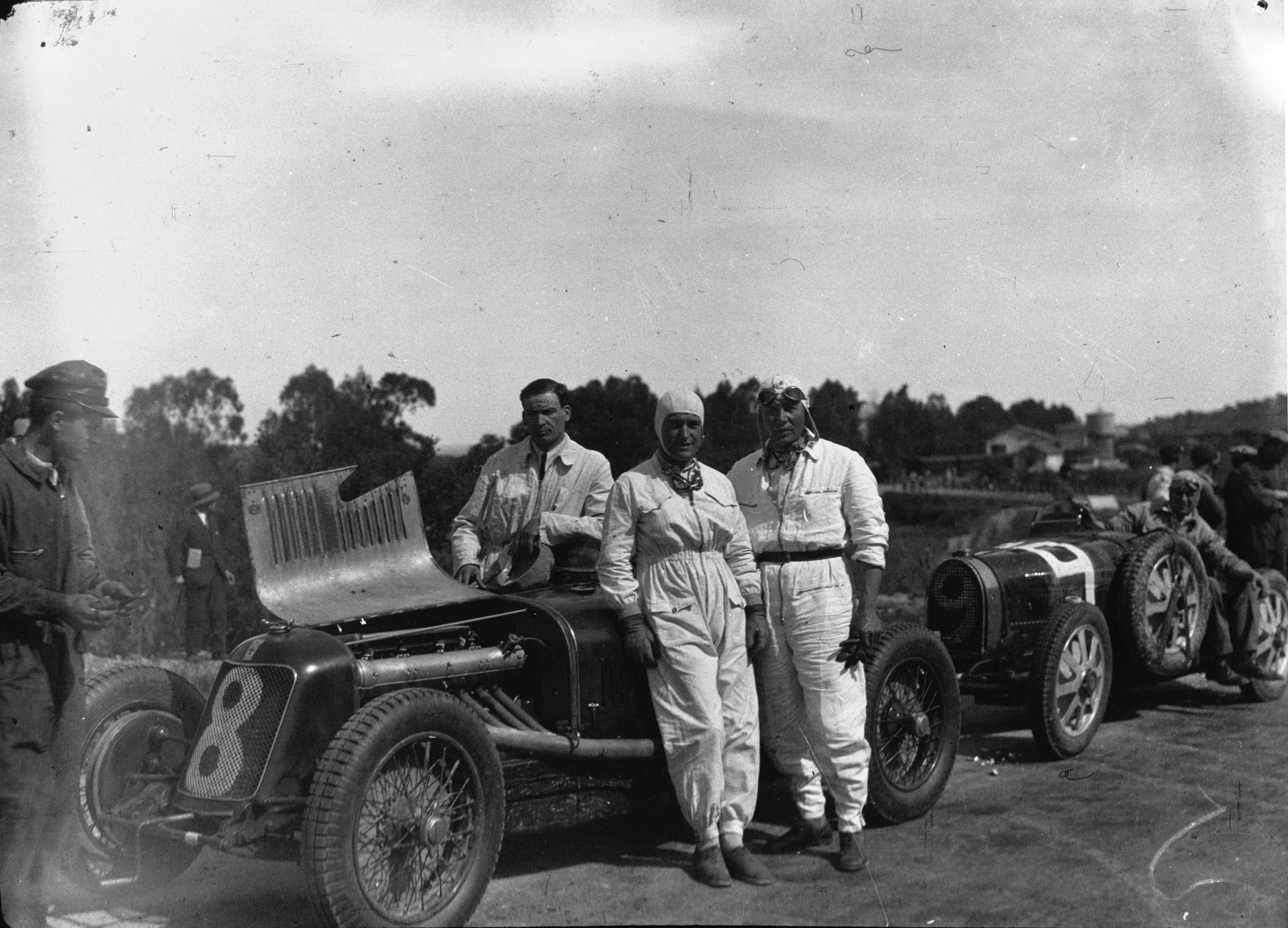
Ruggeri and Fagioli with their Maserati 8C 2800 at the 1932 Targa Florio

In 1929, he took up racing on four wheels, buying a Maserati Tipo 26, and in 1931 bought a Talbot Grand Prix car from the estate of Emilio Materassi. He made his Grand Prix debut at the 1931 Italian Grand Prix, sharing his Talbot with Renato Balestrero to a 7th place finish. By the end of the season the Officine Maserai had signed him up as a works driver, and he triumphed for the marque in the 2-litre heat at the 1931 Monza Grand Prix.

In 1932 Maserati used him as its junior driver for the senior Grands Prix, in an 8C 3-litre model. His best result was 5th in the 1932 Targa Florio, although at the German Grand Prix he drove in both the Grand Prix and the Voiturette classes; after his Grand Prix model retired early, he took over the 4CM of Ernesto Maserati, and brought it home third in class.

== Death ==
The monumental grave in honour of Raggi and Ruggieri

Ruggeri was killed in an accident during a speed record attempt at the Speed Weeks at Montlhéry at the end of 1932, at the wheel of the sixteen cylinder 4.9-litre Maserati V5 which had come second in the 1932 Italian Grand Prix in the hands of Luigi Fagioli. He was buried in a tomb of honour in Bologna's Certosa Cemetary, where fellow motorcycle hero Olindo Raggi had also been buried.

== Personal life ==
Ruggeri was nicknamed Il Leone di Bologna (the Bologna lion) because of his daring riding style; at races he also brought along a pet monkey, Gigina, as a lucky charm - Gigina died a week before Ruggeri's fateful record attempt.

Two of Ruggieri's children, Jader and Luigi, became motorcycle racers. Jader was killed in practice for the 1947 Grand Prix of Europe at Bremgarten, Switzerland, riding a Gilera 500. His brother Luigi Ruggeri became the 3rd Category Italian Champion in 1946, winning races at Fidenza and Mantua on a Moto Guzzi 500 in 1947, but was forced to retire from racing through injury before the 1940s were out.

Ruggeri was not related to the Ruggeri brothers who formed the Scuderia Milano team after the Second World War.

== European Championship ==
(key) (Races in bold indicate pole position)

Year	Entrant	Make	1	2	3	EDC	Points
1931	private entry	Talbot 700	ITA; 7	FRA	BEL	14=	20
1932	Maserati	Maserati 8C	ITA; 8	FRA	GER ret	9=	19

== Full results ==
- Golden Era of Grand Prix Motor Racing
