= 1948 Penya Rhin Grand Prix =

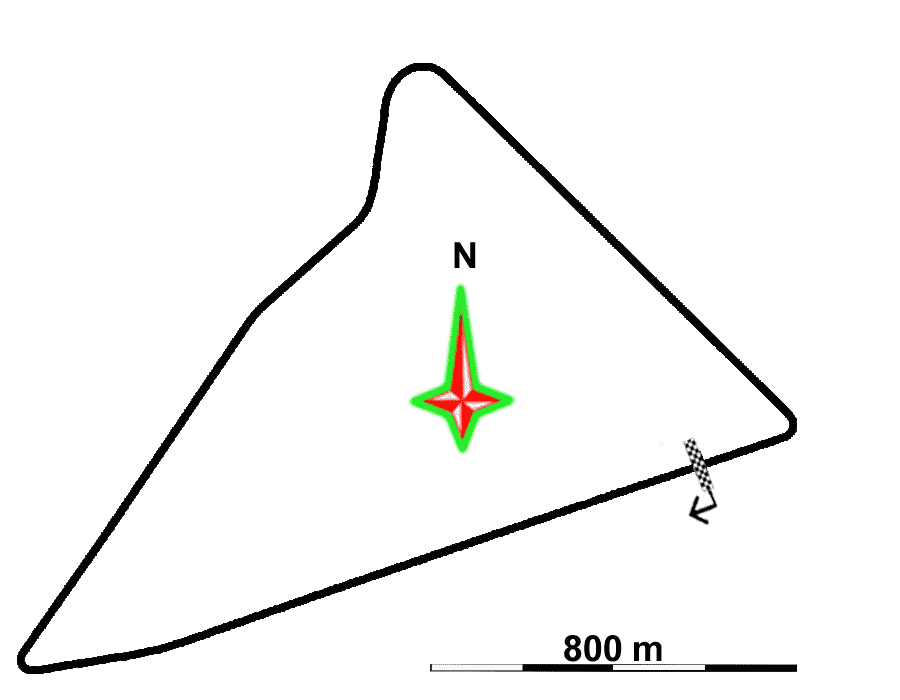

Race details
- Date: 31 October 1948
- Official name: IX Gran Premio de Penya Rhin
- Location: Pedralbes Circuit, Barcelona, Spain
- Course: Temporary road circuit
- Course length: 4.465 km (2.774 mi)
- Distance: 70 laps, 312.33 km (194.07 mi)

Pole position
Driver	(Italy) Luigi Villoresi	Maserati
- Time: unknown

Fastest lap
Driver	(Italy) Luigi Villoresi	Maserati
- Time: 1:46

Podium
First	(Italy) Luigi Villoresi	Maserati
Second	(United Kingdom) Reg Parnell	Maserati
Third	(Monaco) Louis Chiron	Talbot-Lago

The IX Gran Premio de Penya Rhin was a motor race for Formula One cars held at Pedralbes Circuit, Barcelona on 31 October 1948. Luigi Villoresi won the race in a Maserati 4CLT/48. Villoresi also qualified on pole position and set fastest lap. Reg Parnell was second in another 4CLT/48 and Louis Chiron third in a Talbot-Lago T26C.

== Result ==
Pos	No	Driver	Entrant	Constructor	Time/Retired	Grid
1	6	(Italy) Luigi Villoresi	Scuderia Ambrosiana	Maserati 4CLT/48	2:10:12, 143.94kph	1
2	28	(United Kingdom) Reg Parnell	Reg Parnell	Maserati 4CLT/48	+28s	7
3	24	(Monaco) Louis Chiron	Ecurie France	Talbot-Lago T26C	+3:24	5
4	32	(France) Louis Rosier	Ecurie Rosier	Talbot-Lago T26C	+4 laps	13
5	48	(United Kingdom) Cuth Harrison	Cuth Harrison	ERA B-Type	+7 laps	12
6	34	(United Kingdom) Fred Ashmore	Fred Ashmore	Maserati 4CLT	+11 laps	20
7	46	(Spain) César Apezteguía	Ecurie Rosier	Talbot-Lago T26C	+11 laps	17
8	26	(France) Yves Giraud-Cabantous	Ecurie France	Talbot-Lago T26C	+11 laps	22
9	44	(United Kingdom) Bob Gerard	Bob Gerard	ERA B-Type	+14 laps	11
10	18	(Switzerland) Claude Bernheim (Italy) Franco Cornacchia	Claude Bernheim	Maserati 4CL	+15 laps	18
Ret	14	(Thailand) B. Bira	Scuderia Ferrari	Ferrari 125	61 laps, transmission	2
Ret	52	(Italy) Giuseppe Farina	Scuderia Ferrari	Ferrari 125	51 laps, transmission	3
Ret	4	(Italy) Alberto Ascari	Scuderia Ambrosiana	Maserati 4CLT/48	1 lap, supercharger	4
Ret	22	(United Kingdom) Leslie Brooke	Leslie Brooke	Maserati 4CLT/48	1 lap, accident	6
Ret	2	(Brazil) Francisco Landi	Scuderia Milano	Maserati 4CL	Engine	16
Ret	8	(Argentina) Clemar Bucci	Scuderia Ambrosiana	Maserati 4CL	Engine	24
Ret	10	(Switzerland) Emmanuel de Graffenried	Enrico Plate	Maserati 4CL	Engine	10
Ret	12	(Italy) Gianfranco Comotti	Gianfranco Comotti	Talbot-Lago T26C	Brakes	8
Ret	16	(France) Eugène Chaboud	Ecurie France	Talbot-Lago T26C	Gasket	9
Ret	30	(Italy) Piero Taruffi	Scuderia Milano	Maserati 4CL	Engine	14
Ret	38	(Spain) Paco Godia	Scuderia Auto Spagnola	Maserati 4CL	Engine	15
Ret	40	(Spain) Juan Jover	Scuderia Auto Spagnola	Maserati 4CL	Shock absorber	19
Ret	58	(Spain) Julio González-Pola	Scuderia Ferrari	Ferrari 125	Engine	21

Grand Prix Race
Previous race: 1948 Garda Grand Prix	1948 Grand Prix season Grandes Épreuves	Next race: 1949 Buenos Aires Grand Prix (I)
Previous race: 1946 Penya Rhin Grand Prix	Penya Rhin Grand Prix	Next race: 1950 Penya Rhin Grand Prix
