= 1950 Penya Rhin Grand Prix =

- Non-championship race in the 1950 Formula One season
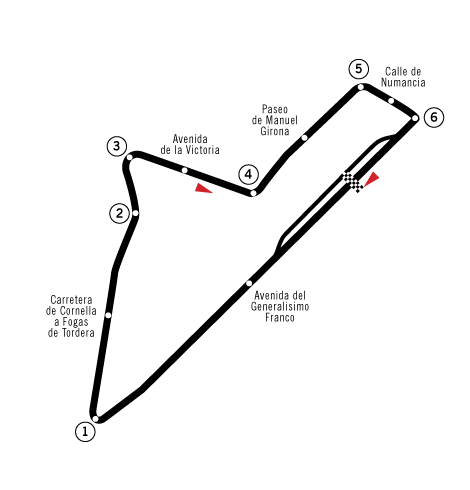

Race details
- Date: 29 October 1950
- Official name: X Gran Premio de Penya Rhin
- Location: Pedralbes Circuit
- Course: Pedralbes Circuit
- Course length: 6.316 km (3.925 miles)
- Distance: 50 laps, 315.800 km (196.230 miles)

Pole position
Driver	(Italy) Alberto Ascari	Ferrari

Fastest lap
Driver	(Italy) Alberto Ascari	Ferrari
- Time: 2:24.2

Podium
First	(Italy) Alberto Ascari	Ferrari
Second	(Italy) Dorino Serafini	Ferrari
Third	(Italy) Piero Taruffi	Ferrari

The 1950 Penya Rhin Grand Prix was a non-championship Formula One motor race held at Pedralbes Circuit on 29 October 1950.

== Classification ==
=== Race ===
Pos	No	Driver	Manufacturer	Laps	Time/Retired	Grid
1		(Italy) Alberto Ascari	Ferrari	50	2:05:14.8	1
2		(Italy) Dorino Serafini	Ferrari	50	+ 1:40.6	2
3		(Italy) Piero Taruffi	Ferrari	48	+ 2 laps	3
4		(France) Philippe Étançelin	Talbot-Lago	47	+ 3 laps	11
5		(Switzerland) Emmanuel de Graffenried	Maserati	47	+ 3 laps	6
6		(France) Yves Giraud-Cabantous	Talbot-Lago	46	+ 4 laps	16
7		(France) Georges Grignard	Talbot-Lago	46	+ 4 laps	17
8		(France) Henri Louveau	Talbot-Lago	43	+ 7 laps	22
9		(United Kingdom) David Murray	Maserati	43	+ 7 laps	19
10		(Spain) Juan Jover	Milano-Speluzzi	36	+ 14 laps	14
Ret		(France) Robert Manzon	Simca-Gordini	34	Transmission	18
Ret		(United Kingdom) Peter Walker	BRM	33	Oil pipe	5
Ret		(France) André Simon	Simca-Gordini	31	Transmission	8
Ret		(Spain) Francesco Godia Sales	Maserati-Milano	27	Engine	13
Ret		(Monaco) Louis Chiron	Maserati	19	Transmission	12
Ret		(Belgium) Johnny Claes	Talbot-Lago	14		21
Ret		(France) Louis Rosier	Talbot-Lago	10	Accident	7
Ret		(Thailand) Prince Bira	Maserati	10	Oil leak	15
Ret		(France) Maurice Trintignant	Simca-Gordini	10	Transmission	10
Ret		(United States) Luigi Chinetti	Ferrari	5	Ignition	20
Ret		(Italy) Franco Rol	Maserati	3	Accident	9
Ret		(United Kingdom) Reg Parnell	BRM	2	Supercharger	4
DNS		(Spain) César Apezteguía	Talbot-Lago	0	Car sold	

Previous race: 1950 Goodwood Trophy	Formula One non-championship races 1950 season	Next race: 1950 Chilean Grand Prix
Previous race: 1948 Penya Rhin Grand Prix	Penya Rhin Grand Prix	Next race: 1954 Penya Rhin Grand Prix
