= Penya Rhin Grand Prix =

Coordinates: 41°23′25″N 2°07′00″E

- Pedralbes Circuit
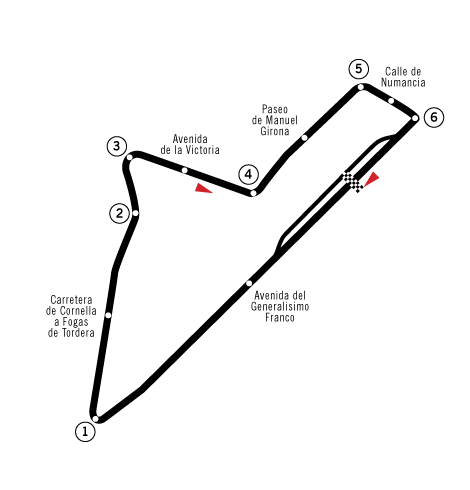

Race information
- Number of times held: 15
- First held: 1916
- Last held: 1954
- Most wins (drivers): no repeat winners
- Most wins (constructors): (Italy) Alfa Romeo (3)
- Circuit length: 6.316 km (3.925 miles)
- Race length: 252.64 km (156.92 miles)
- Laps: 40

Last race (1954)

Pole position

Podium
- 1. (France) F. Picard; Ferrari; 1:42:43.7 (147.5 km/h); 2. (United Kingdom) R. Salvadori; Ecurie Ecosse Jaguar; +16.1s; 3. (United Kingdom) N. Sanderson; Ecurie Ecosse Jaguar; +2:19s

Fastest lap
- (France) Jean Behra; Gordini; 1:27.3

The Penya Rhin Grand Prix was a Grand Prix motor racing event staged at the three different circuits in three different eras in Spain. The race was held intermittently over its history, sometimes for full-size Grand Prix cars, sometimes for sports cars. In the 1920s, it was held at a street circuit in Vilafranca del Penedès. In the 1930s the race was revived at a parkland circuit in Montjuïc. In the 1940s and 1950s after the war it was held at the Pedralbes Circuit.

Year	Driver	Constructor	Circuit
1921	(Spain) Pierre de Vizcaya	Bugatti	Vilafranca
1922	(United Kingdom) Kenelm Lee Guinness	Talbot	Vilafranca
1923	(France) Albert Divo	Talbot	Vilafranca
1924 – 1932	Not held		
1933	(Chile) Juan Zanelli	Alfa Romeo	Montjuïc
1934	(Italy) Achille Varzi	Alfa Romeo	Montjuïc
1935	(Italy) Luigi Fagioli	Mercedes-Benz	Montjuïc
1936	(Italy) Tazio Nuvolari	Alfa Romeo	Montjuïc
1937 – 1945	Not held		
1946	(Italy) Giorgio Pelassa	Maserati	Pedralbes
1947	Not held		
1948	(Italy) Luigi Villoresi	Maserati	Pedralbes
1949	Not held		
1950	(Italy) Alberto Ascari	Ferrari	Pedralbes
