= Bernhard Ackerl =

Austrian racing driver (b. 1908

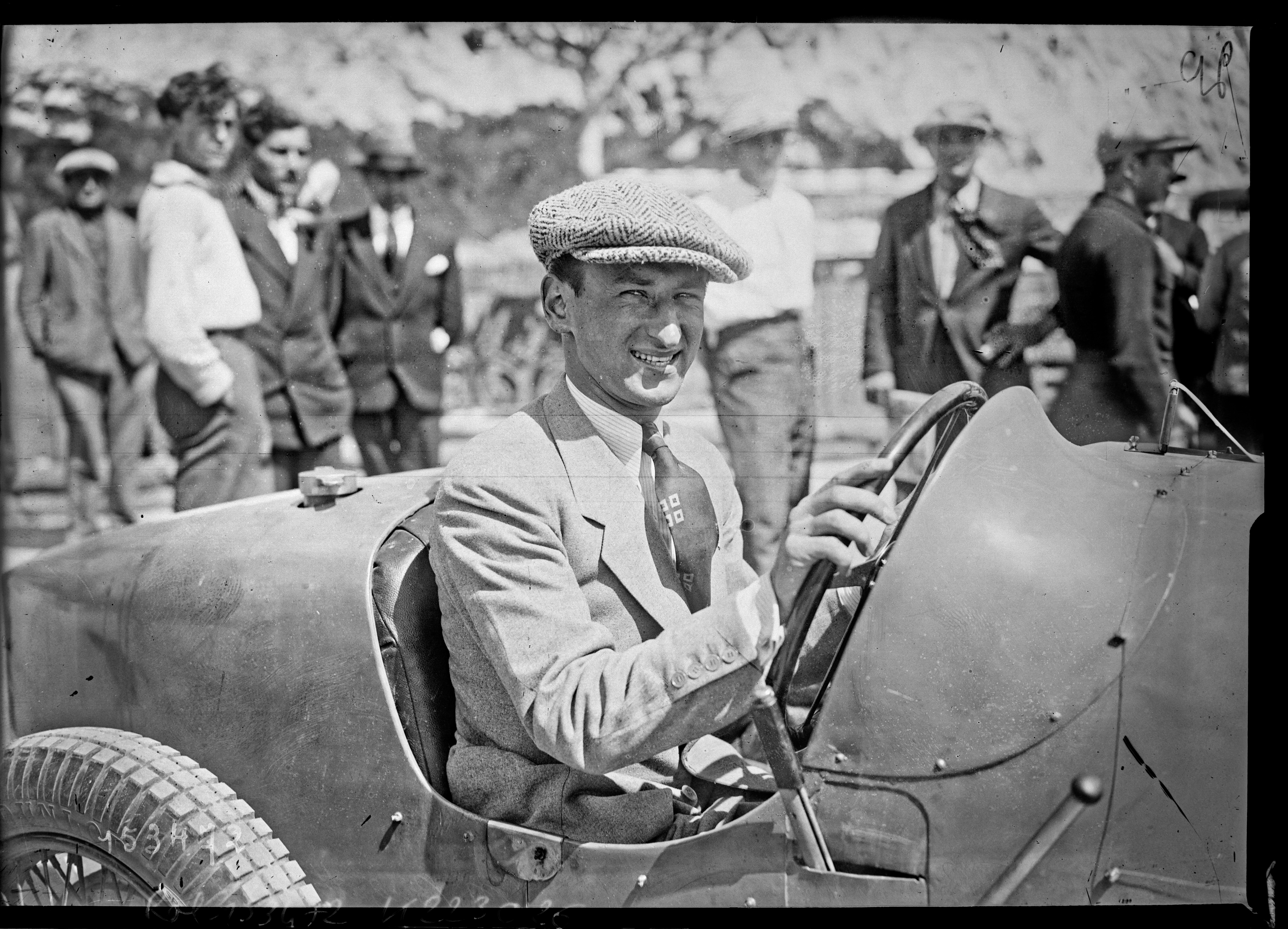
- With his Bugatti at the 1931 Monaco Grand Prix
- Born: 1908

Bernhard Ackerl was an Austrian Grand Prix driver, who took part in the 1931 Monaco Grand Prix.

== Career ==
The first recorded entry for Ackerl was at a Vienna Sportsclub meeting in February 1926, driving a 6-litre Packard, and Ackerl gained some success in domestic hillclimbs, winning the 1.5l sportscar class at Gaisberg and Zirler Berg in 1929 in a Steyr Type XII which he had bought from the works. He ventured outside Austria in 1930, and earned some minor placings driving an Austro Daimler and Bugatti in 1930 and 1931.

His sole Grand Prix appearance came at Monaco in 1931, driving a Bugatti Type 37A (chassis 37381). The engine was a 1.5 litre non-supercharged engine, which made it considerably the smallest and least powerful in the field. He was therefore much the slowest in practice, not being able to break 3 minutes per lap, 40 seconds behind the next slowest. The grid however was drawn by lot and he started from the front row. He quickly fell to the back, and retired on lap 56 in front of the Monte Carlo Casino, when a small fire broke out under his car.

He entered two more Grands Prix - the 1931 Masarykuv Okruh and the voiturette class of the 1932 Avusrennen - but did not turn up for either. His last recorded entry was at the Präbichl mountain climb, again in his Type 37A, in 1932; in 1934 he sold his Bugatti to Hans Simons. Despite such marginal levels of success, in 1934 he was awarded the Golden Sports Badge by the Österreichischer Automobil-Club.

== Personal life ==
Ackerl's family was in the hotel business, and Ackerl based his operations at Matzleindorfer Platz in Vienna. In 1940 he was fined 4,000 Reichsmarks for selling horsemeat at inflated prices.
