= Gordini T24S =

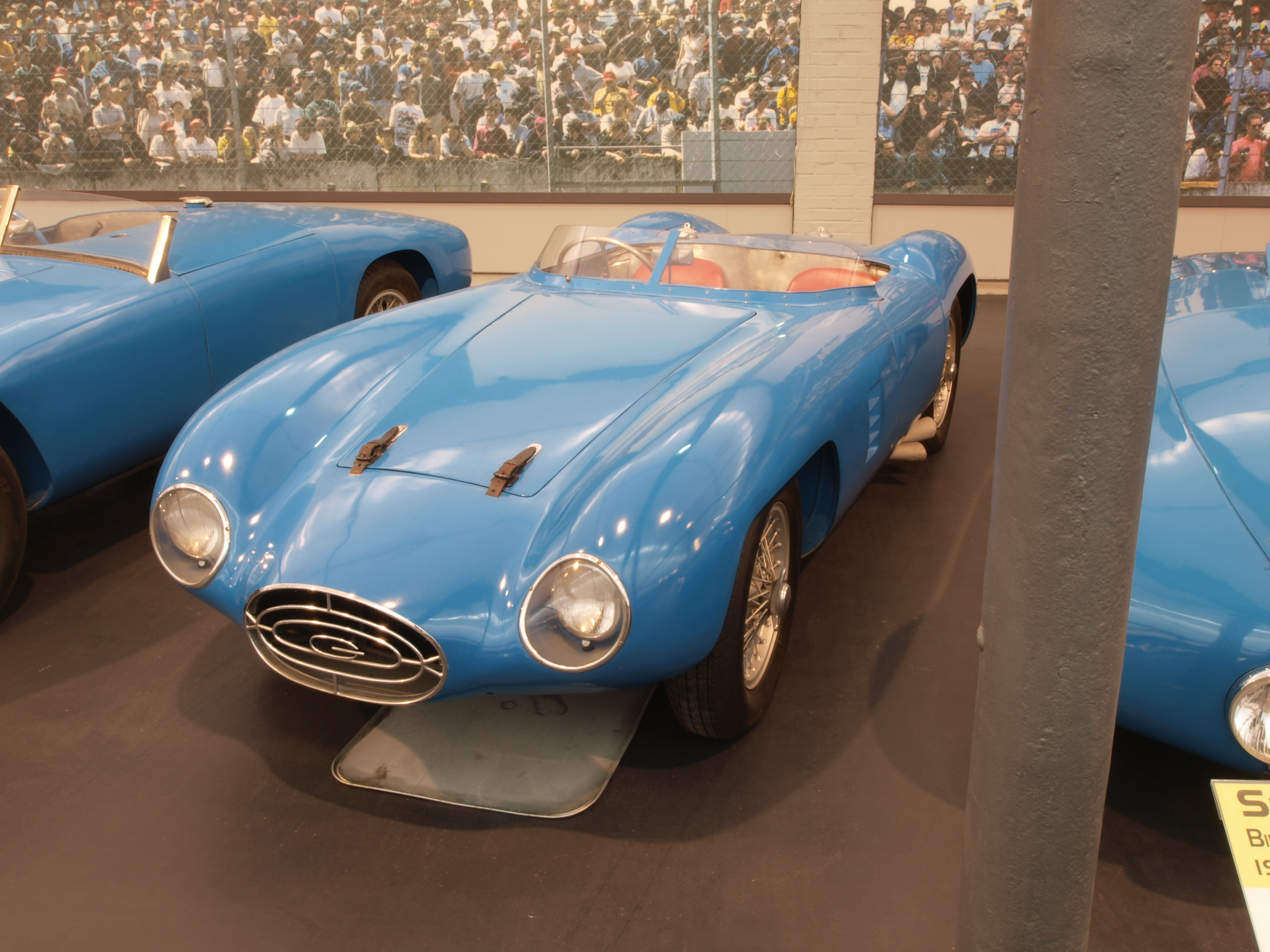
- Category: Sports car
- Constructor: Gordini

Technical specifications
- Chassis: Steel tubular spaceframe, aluminum body
- Suspension (front): Double wishbones, independent with torsion bar springs, Messier shock absorbers, anti-roll bar
- Suspension (rear): Rear rigid live axle, Watts linkage, Messier hydraulic shock absorbers, trailing arms, anti-roll bar
- Axle track: 1,240 mm (48.8 in) (Front); 1,218 mm (48.0 in) (Rear)
- Wheelbase: 2,300 mm (90.6 in)
- Engine: 3.0 L (183.1 cu in) I8 naturally-aspirated mid-engined
- Transmission: 4/5-speed manual
- Power: 220–263 hp (164–196 kW) at 6500 rpm
- Weight: 680–780 kg (1,499–1,720 lb)
- Brakes: Disc brakes

Competition history

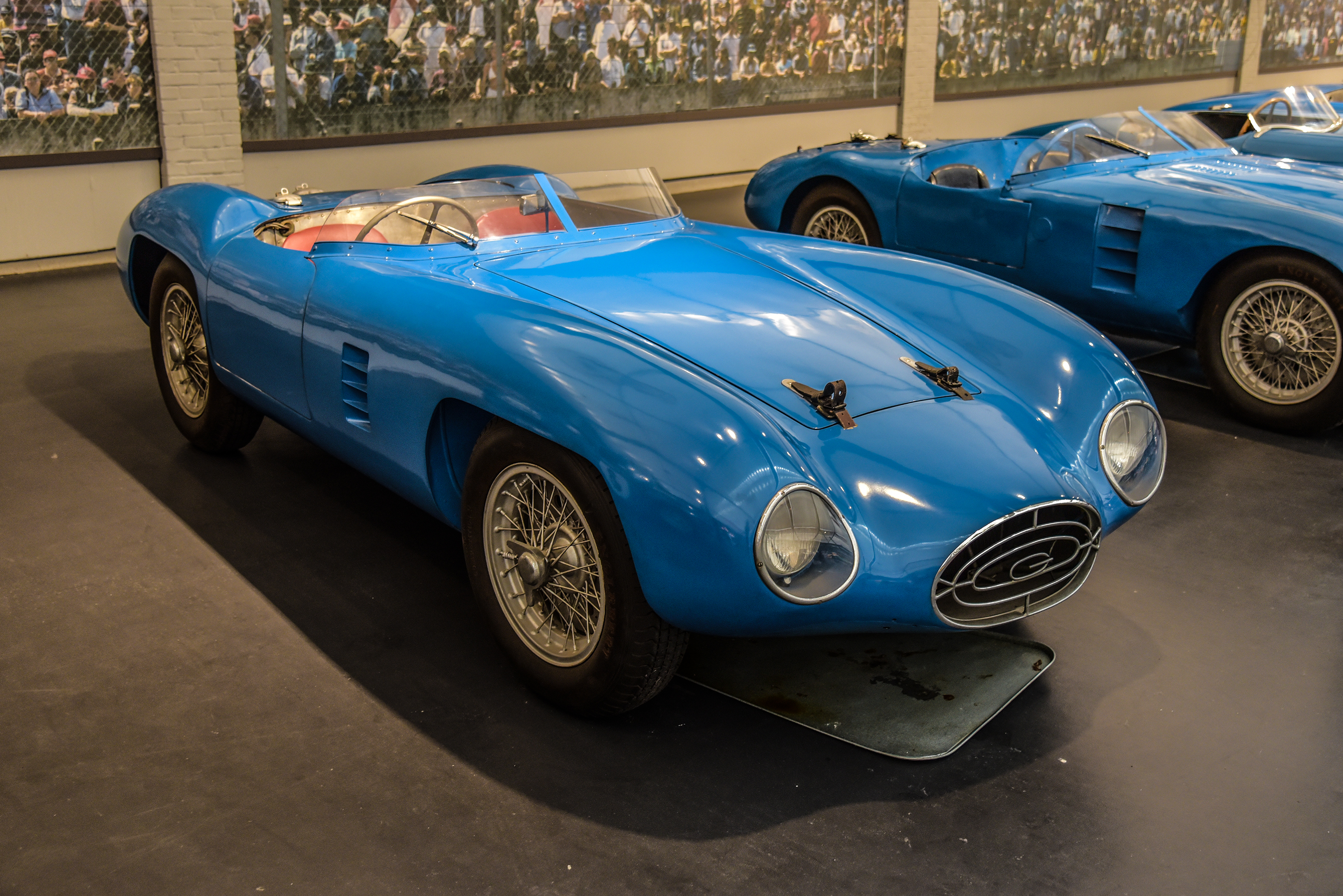
1953 Gordini T24S

The Gordini Type 24S is a sports racing car, designed, developed, and built by French manufacturer Gordini, in 1953.

== Development history and technology ==
The development of the Type 24 was Amédée Gordini 's most ambitious sports car project to date. The car had a 3-liter 8-cylinder in-line engine consisting of two 4-cylinder blocks. The unit was an in-house construction, since Simca had ended the cooperation after a lack of success. There was also a new 5-speed quick-shift gearbox.

Gordini built two chassis, which received the numbers 0036S and 0037S. The chassis was made of tubular steel and the body was made of aluminum. Both cars were driven by the factory team in sports car races. The French writer Françoise Sagan was interested in chassis 0036S in 1956 but did not buy the car. It was then bought by André Guelfi, who continued to race with it. After several changes of ownership, the fully restored racing car was offered at auction in 2014 with a minimum bid of 2.5 million euros.

Chassis 0037S was acquired by the brothers Fritz and Hans Schlumpf in 1955 and is now in the Musée National de l'Automobile.

== Racing history ==
Originally Type 24 was due to make its racing debut at the 1953 24 Hours of Le Mans, but chassis 0036S was not finished on time and were only a reserve. It then made its debut at the 1953 Reims 12 Hours, with Jean Behra and Jean Lucas at the wheel. Starting the race from fifth place in practice, the car retired after an accident. The first finish came three weeks later at the Caen Grand Prix, where Jean Lucas finished sixth. However, he was four laps down on Pierre Chancel in the small Panhard X85.

In 1954, both cars were run in the World Sportscar Championship without much success. There were victories apart from the big sports car races. Franco Bordoni-Bisleri won the Trullo d'Oro and the Pergusa Grand Prix; Jean Behra remained successful at the Coupe du Salon.

From 1955 the Type 24S was only driven by private drivers and finally disappeared from the racing circuits after a failure at the 24-hour race in Le Mans in 1957.
