= Juan Zanelli =

Chilean racecar driver

Juan Ernesto Zanelli de Vescovi
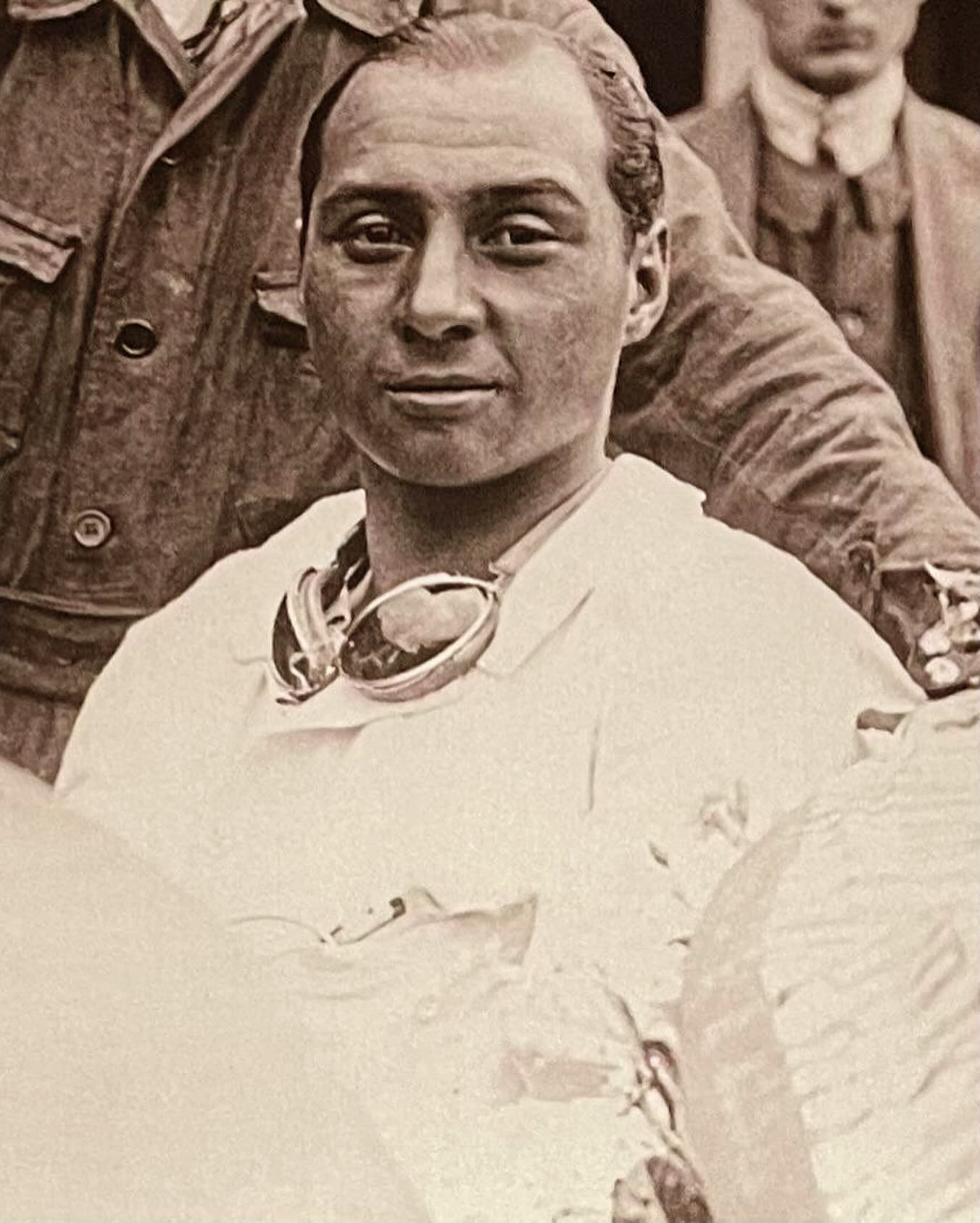
- Born: 1906; Iquique, Chile
- Died: 19 August 1944 (age 37-38); Toulouse, France
- Occupations: Racing driver, Chilean Consul

Juan Ernesto Zanelli de Vescovi (1906 – 19 August 1944) was a prominent Chilean racing driver, considered the first Chilean and the first South American to win a Grand Prix in Europe. He triumphed in three Grand Prix races in the early 1930s: two in Le Mans and one in Barcelona. He raced for Bugatti, Nacional Pescara, Alfa Romeo, Maserati, Torino, and Villa Padierna in the Grand Prix of the 1920s and 1930s, the predecessors of Formula 1. In 1931, he was crowned champion of the European Hill Climb Championship, which later gave rise to the World Rally Championship.

== Life ==
He was the son of Nicolás Zanelli, an Italian immigrant who made a fortune in the nitrate fields of Antofagasta, and Adela de Vescovi, a native of Tarapacá. He spent his childhood between Iquique, Santiago, and Valparaíso. At that time, the wealthiest families, especially foreigners, studied abroad and for Juan this meant an education at Wrekin College, Shropshire, England from 1921-23, finishing his studies in Switzerland. After completing his studies, he settled in Nice as a consul.

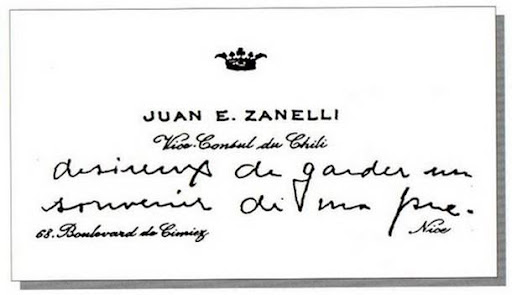
Juan Zanelli's document as Consul of Chile.

He began to establish contacts with the European aristocracy, something very difficult at that time, especially for a South American. Their shared passion was motorsports, which was then exclusive to the wealthy. During this period, "gentleman drivers" emerged, people who had the passion and financial resources to participate in high-level motorsport competitions.

== Career path ==
Juan Zanelli appeared in European motor racing competitions driving a two-seater Fiat, which had less power compared to the fast Alfa Romeos or Bugattis. He competed in major European races between 1928 and 1931. He won the Bugatti Grand Prix in Le Mans in 1929 and 1930, becoming the first Latin American to achieve this. He participated in the Monaco Grand Prix and other events in Italy and France, facing mechanical challenges and securing podiums. In 1931, he won the European Hill Climb Championship in the Racing Cars category. Additionally, he acquired a Bugatti and collaborated with important figures in motorsport, such as the Vizcaya brothers and Raúl Pateras Pescara.

== His first races ==
On July 25, 1929, he participated in the VII Gran Premio of San Sebastián. Starting from the first row with Bugatti #4, which he shared with Georges Philippe and Louis Chiron, he was battling Georges Philippe for the first position when he lost control, spinning four times and damaging the front suspension. After managing to get to the pits, he requested the steering wheel of Bugatti #5. However, he had to stop his race on lap 25. Chiron finished in first place, followed by Philippe, Lehoux, Dreyfus, and Bourlier.

He then traveled to Italy to compete in the Pietro Bordino Cup in Alessandria, where he finished in eighth place. He also entered his Bugatti in the Grand Prix of Marne in France, achieving second place. That same year, he participated in the Monza Grand Prix. In Europe, he met the Vizcaya brothers and Ernest Friderich, who was a friend, collaborator, and driver for Ettore Bugatti, the founder of Bugatti and owner of the factory. On September 13, 1928, he acquired one of Pierre de Vizcaya's cars, which had been abandoned in 1924 after an accident, and thus had to be repaired.

Ettore Bugatti organized three annual races, running at the Circuit de la Sarthe. On June 2, 1929, Juan Zanelli would be crowned the winner of the 1929 Bugatti Grand Prix at Le Mans, securing his first victory. He achieved this win under challenging circumstances. During the preparations for the race, he pushed the car to the limit, causing the engine to seize. Despite this, he was determined to race and, at the last minute, persuaded Baron Philippe de Rothschild to sell him one of his cars. Zanelli then took to the track with an unfamiliar car and managed to take first place, winning a luxurious new Bugatti Type 35B as a prize. This was the first international victory for a Chilean driver and the first victory for a Latin American in Europe.

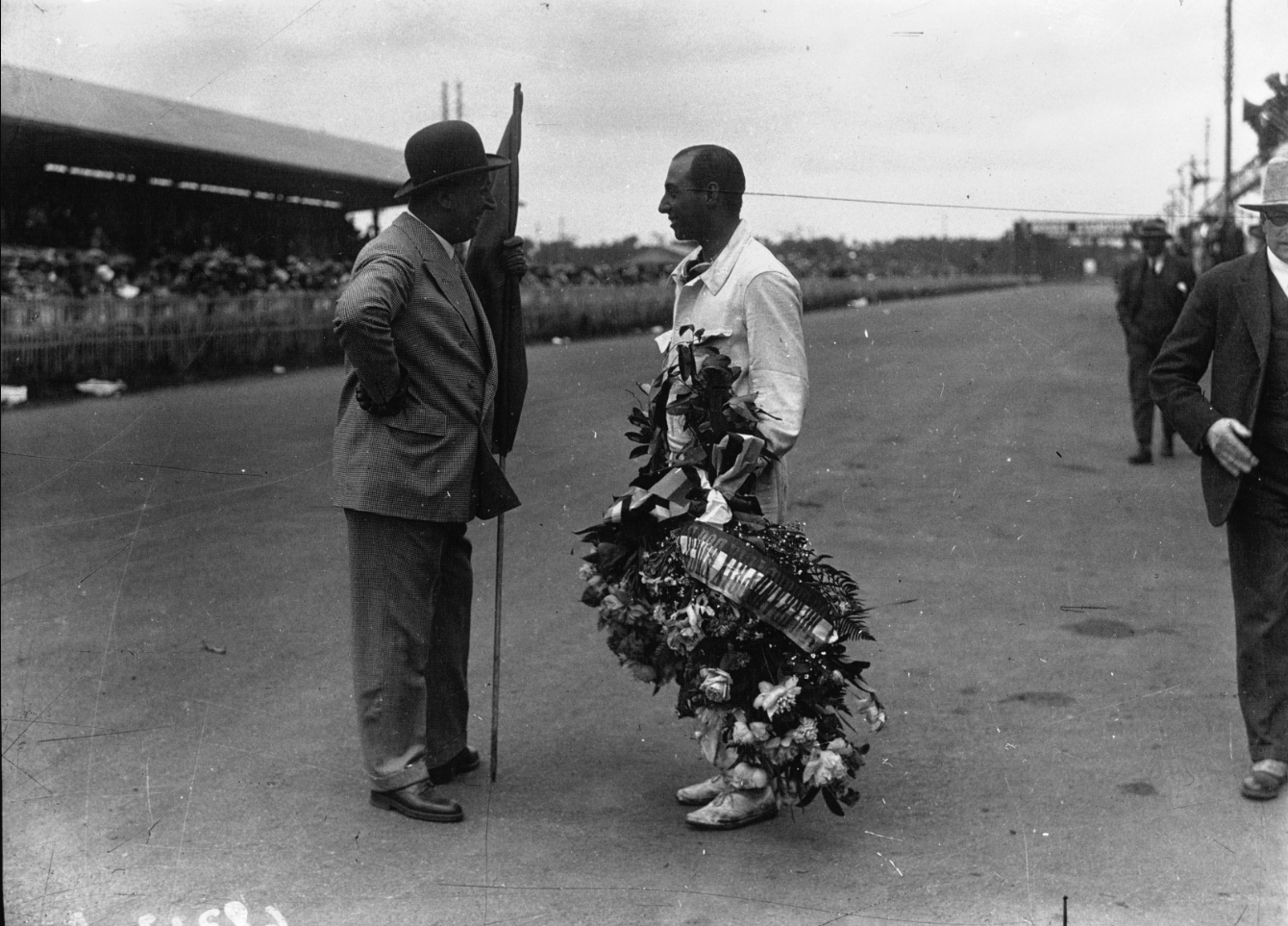
Juan Zanelli after winning the Bugatti Grand Prix with Ettore Bugatti

The official 1930 season of the World Motor Racing Championship began in April of that year with the Monaco Grand Prix at the Monte Carlo circuit. Among the drivers was the Chilean Juan Zanelli. He started from the second row, next to the Monegasque Louis Chiron. Zanelli debuted a new Bugatti Type 35B in the Grand Prix, but due to a mechanical failure, he was forced to retire while in 4th place, with only 8 laps remaining.

He would return to Italy to race again in Alessandria, finishing in second place, with Achille Varzi as the winner and Enzo Ferrari in third place on the podium. Unfortunately, due to a streak of mechanical failures in future races leading to retirements, his performance suffered. However, at the Pau Grand Prix in France, he managed to secure third place. That same year, he participated again in the Bugatti Grand Prix and repeated his achievement by winning first place, earning a Bugatti T43 as the prize.

== Consolidation on the track ==
At that time, the authorities governing motorsport established that drivers' cars had to be painted in the color corresponding to their country. Zanelli did not have a color, as Chile did not have one either, so he painted a triangular Chilean flag on each side of the car. This gesture drew attention and eventually became a custom that is still observed today.

In 1932, he spent much of his time in Chile, resulting in a period of automotive hiatus. However, the following year would be the most significant in his racing career. In 1933, he won the Penya Rhin Grand Prix on June 25, in the first race held at the famous Montjuïc Circuit in Barcelona. This competition consisted of 40 laps around a 4-kilometer circuit and brought together top automotive figures from Spain, Italy, France, and the rest of Europe.

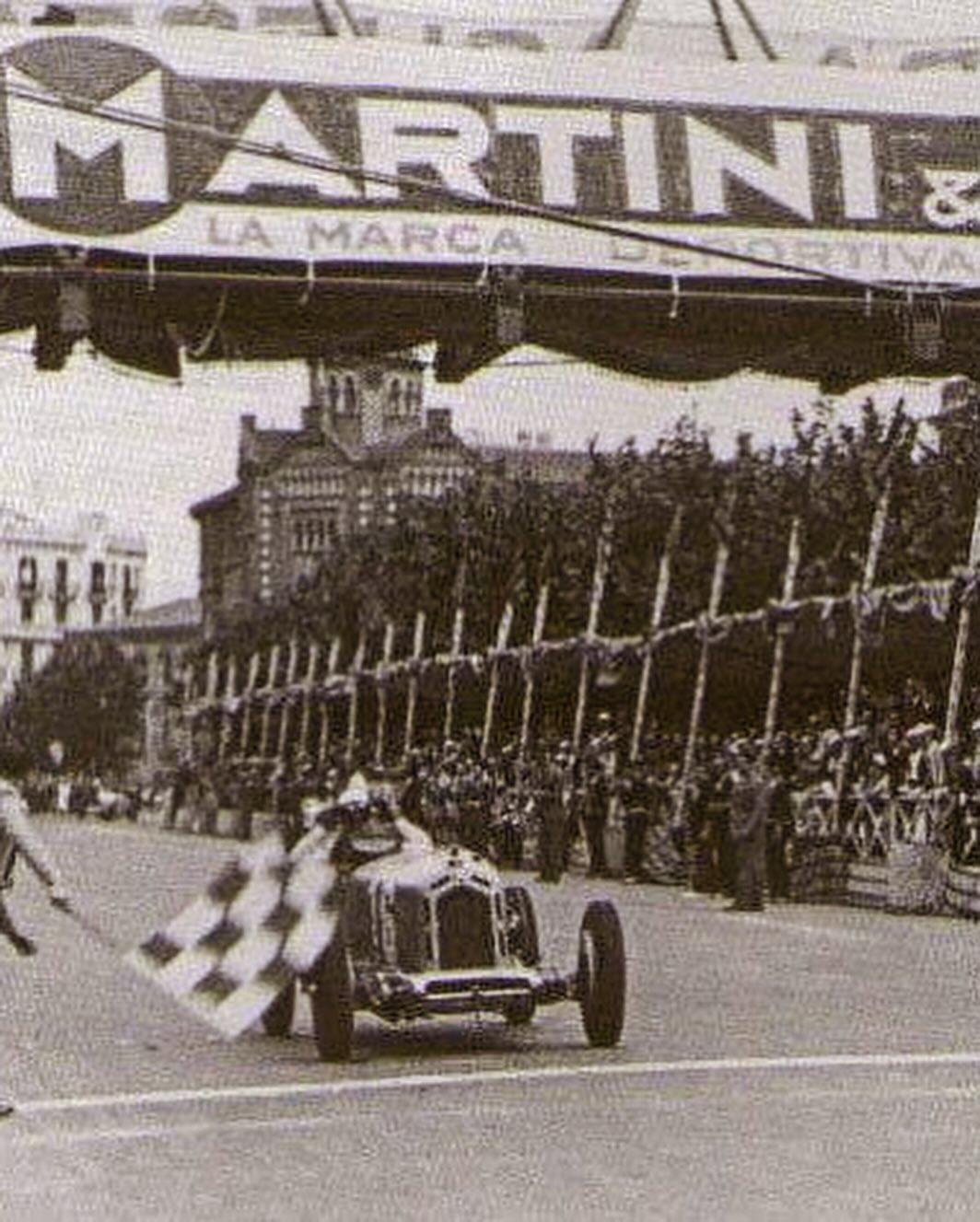
His arrival at the finish line in the IV Penya Rhin Grand Prix of 1933

Zanelli won in 1 hour, 34 minutes, and 43 seconds, ahead of Vasco Sameiro, Marcel Lehoux, Joaquín Palacio, and Tazio Nuvolari. The latter set the fastest lap of the race. This victory marked the first time a Latin American driver won an official Grand Prix valid for the World Championship, and no Chilean has won a top-tier world motorsport event since then.

The Penya Rhin Grand Prix was one of the most prestigious races of that time, later won by drivers such as Luigi Fagioli, Tazio Nuvolari, Giuseppe Farina, and Alberto Ascari, among others. This victory solidified his status as a prominent driver in European Grand Prix racing, with a total of 29 Grand Prix participations, his final race being the 1936 German Grand Prix.

In 1932, he attempted to enter the Monaco Grand Prix with Nacional Pescara but was unsuccessful. Juan Zanelli later managed to purchase Raymond Sommer’s car, a beautiful Alfa Romeo Monza 8c. He competed in the 500 Miles of the British Racing Drivers' Club, finishing sixth, and then participated in the Tunis Grand Prix, where he finished eighth.

== European hill climb championship ==
The Vizcaya brothers introduced him to the businessman Raúl Pateras Pescara, owner of the Spanish company Nacional Pescara, which was dedicated to manufacturing cars. The goal was to create a racing team and launch a sports version to compete in the European Hill Climb Championship. Unlike circuit races, where drivers compete against each other, in hill climbs, each driver competes alone, starting at the base of a mountain and reaching the finish line at the top. Zanelli would win the 1931 championship in the Racing Cars category, while Rudolf Caracciola won in the Sports Cars category. Other notable drivers in this championship included Hans Stuck, Carlo Felice Trossi, Wolfgang von Trips, and Edgar Barth.

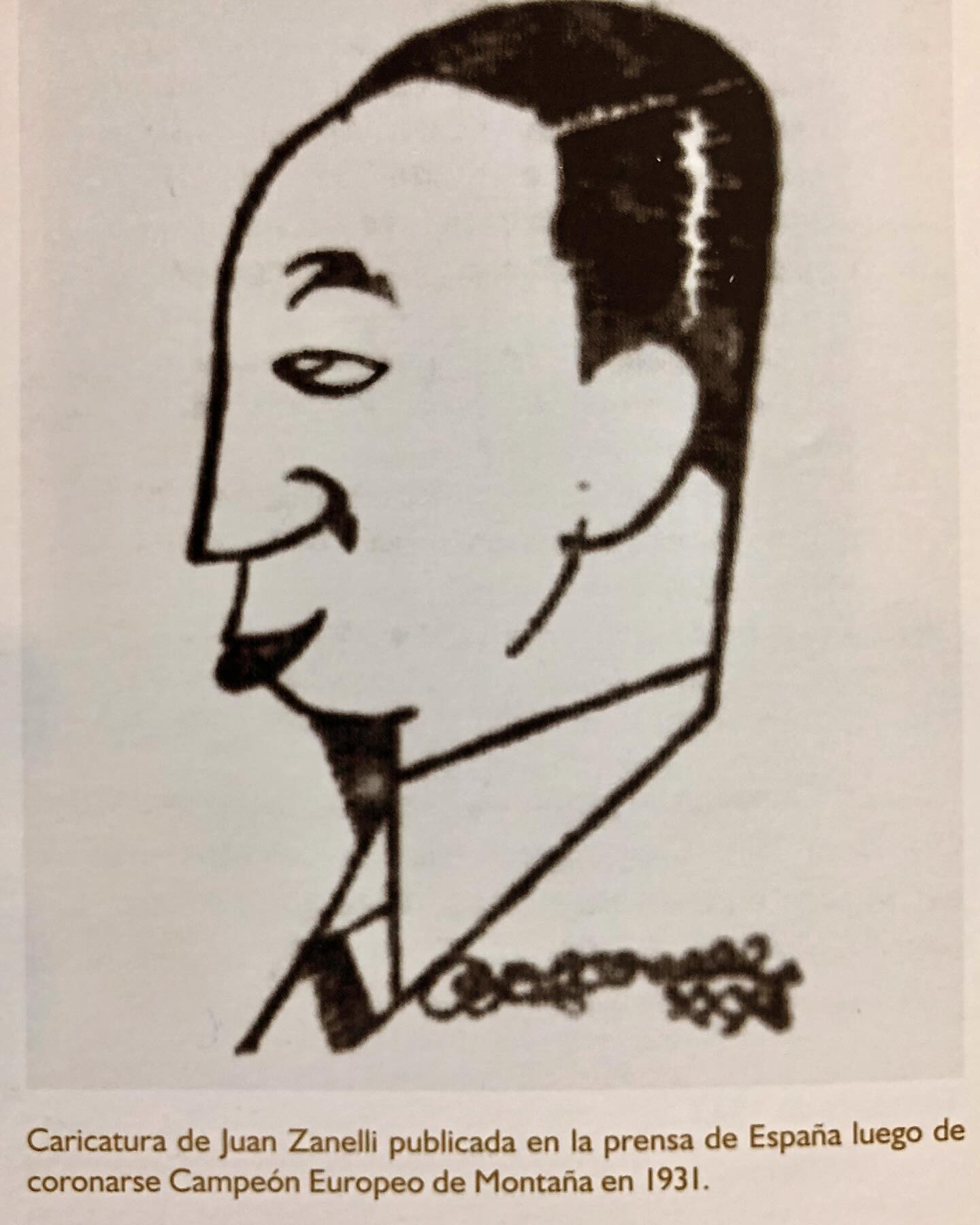
Caricature of Juan Zanelli, Penya Rhin Grand Prix

== Last days ==
His final year as a driver was 1936, when he competed at the Nürburgring Green Hell, driving a Maserati 6C for Scuderia Torino as an independent driver. To add drama to the race, it was run in thick fog and rain. Zanelli managed to survive until the end, finishing in tenth place. A month later, he entered again, this time for the 1936 German Grand Prix. Zanelli drove another Maserati 8CM, belonging to the Villa Padierna team, but ran out of fuel on the first lap and had to retire.

In the early 1940s, the driver married Raymonde Picard, with whom he had two children in France. He joined the French Resistance during World War II along with other drivers he had met throughout his life. Zanelli lost his life in a shootout between Germans and resistance fighters, and was fatally wounded by a gunshot and died in Toulouse, France, on August 19, 1944.

== Popularity ==
Juan Zanelli was relatively unknown in Chile, despite being well-known and respected in the European motorsport world. The only time he appeared in the press was when he won the Penya Rhin Grand Prix in 1933, featured on the cover of the newspaper El Mercurio with the headline: "The Barcelona motor racing cup was won by Juan Zanelli, a Chilean." Today, his obscurity in Chile remains evident. In 2007 and 2008, El Mercurio, and in 2021, La Tercera, highlighted Juan Zanelli’s story from Europe. Unfortunately, he remains an unrecognized figure in Chilean motorsport and was never mentioned in the press again, not even on the day of his tragic death.

=== Book about his life ===
Juan Zanelli remained lost in Chilean anonymity for a long time until he was "rediscovered" in December 2007 thanks to the research conducted by the author of the book "Coche a la Vista", lawyer Rodrigo Velasco. The book unveils the little-known story of Juan Zanelli, a result of five years of investigation that involved traveling to Europe and the places where the driver had his best performances.

Sporting achievements
| Preceded by Hans Stuck | European Hill Climb Champion (for Racing Cars); 1931 | Succeeded by Rudolf Caracciola |
