= Nacional Pescara =

- Industry: Automotive
- Founded: 1929
- Defunct: 1932
- Fate: ceased production
- Headquarters: Barcelona, Spain
- Key people: Raúl Pateras Pescara, founder
- Products: Automobiles

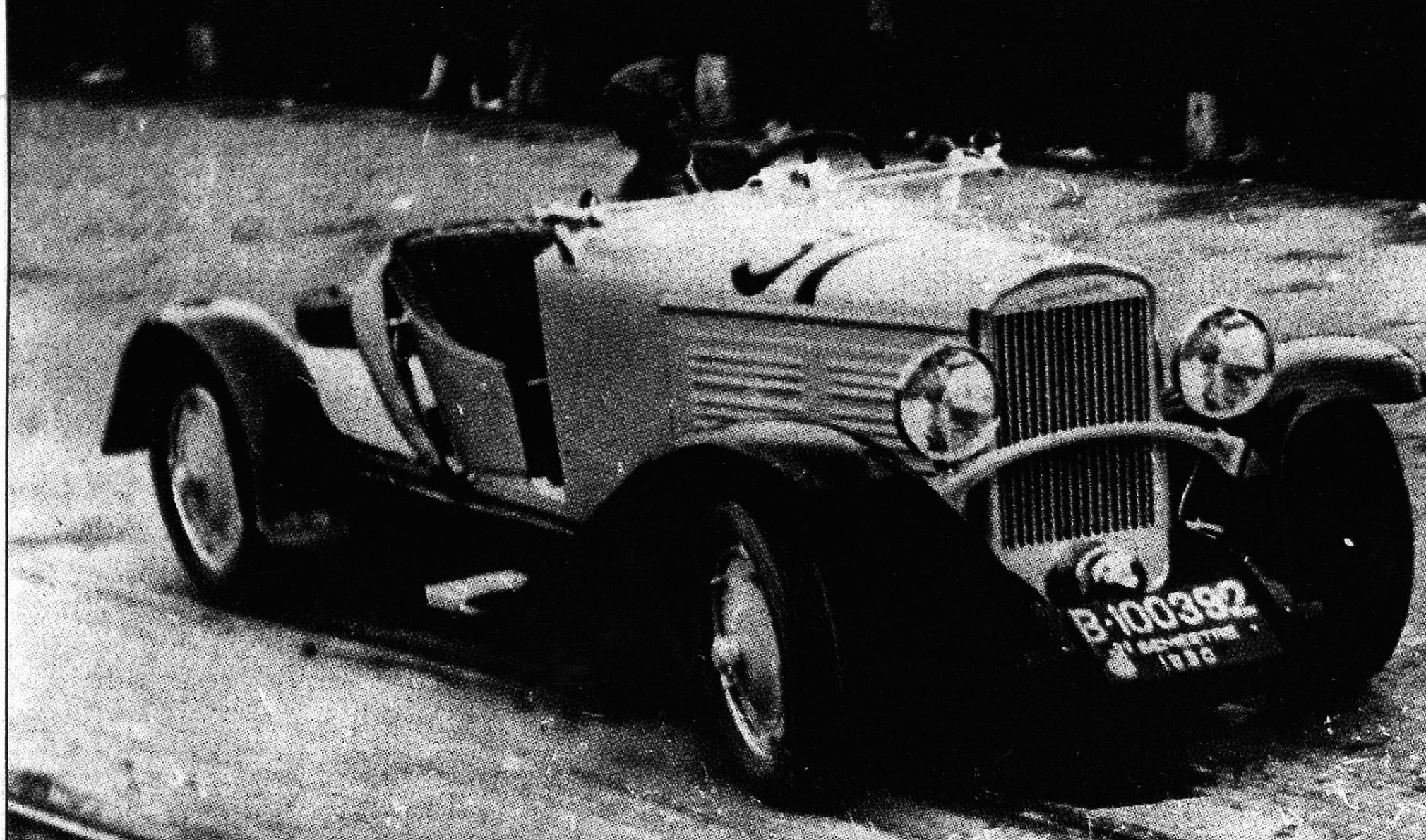
National Pescara in 1930

Nacional Pescara was a government backed attempt to create a Spanish motor industry. The project was the idea of Raúl Pateras Pescara, and the first car was designed by his brother Enrique and Italian engineer Edmond Moglia. The company was set up in 1929 in Barcelona with an investment of 70 million pesetas, cars went on sale in 1930.

The car produced was called the Eight and was a twin cam inline eight-cylinder engine with a 3L capacity and 125 bhp (93 kW) driving the rear wheels. The car could be had with a selection of body styles. There were plans for a straight 10 3.9 litre version but this never materialised.

In 1931 the "Sport" variation of the Nacional Pescara tuned for racing won the European Hill Climb Championship.

The company ceased to exist just before the 1936 Spanish revolution, with the last car being built in 1932.
