= Maserati 8C =

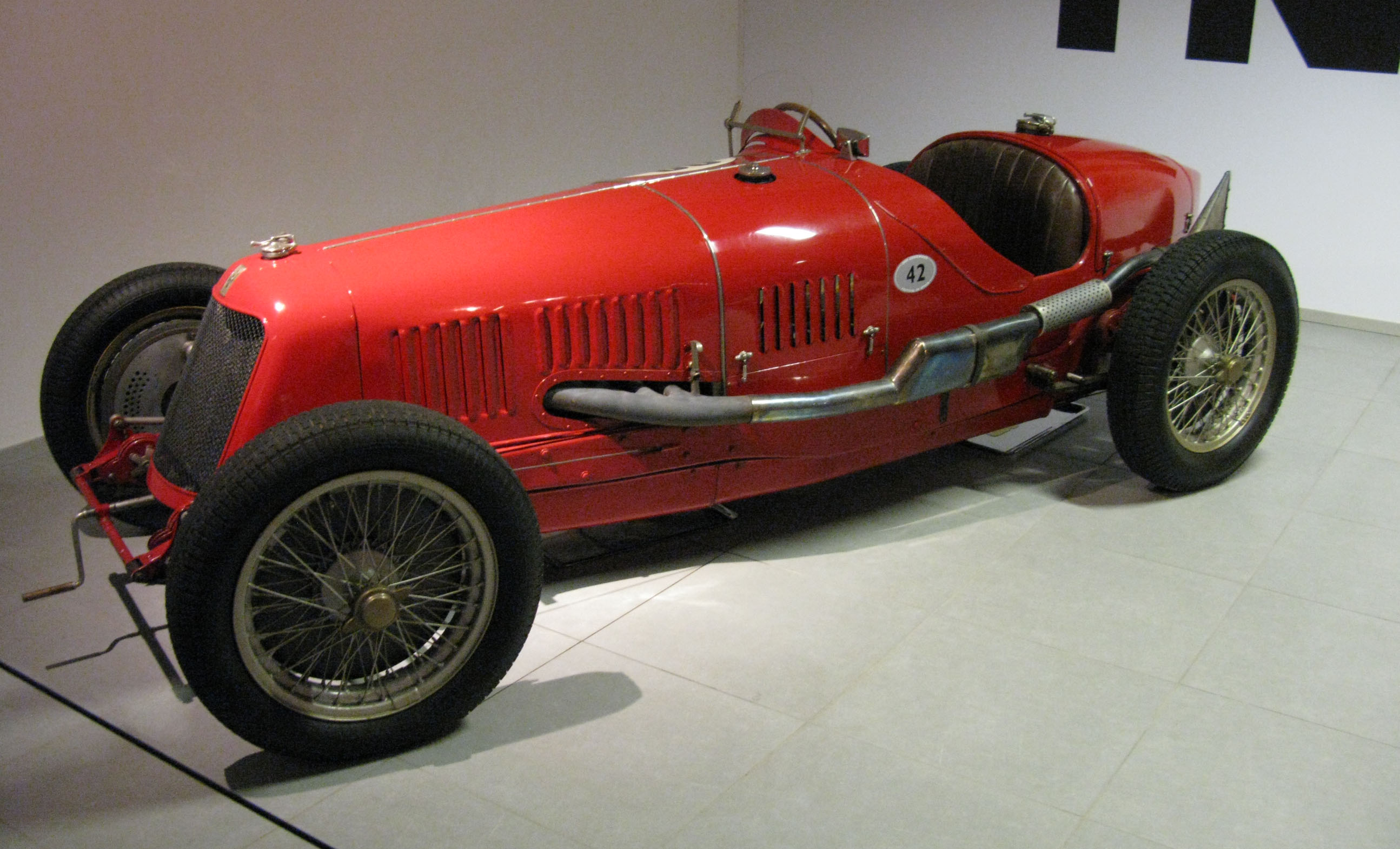
- 1932 Maserati 8C 3000 Louwman

Overview
- Manufacturer: Maserati
- Also called: Maserati 8C 2800/3000
- Production: 1931-1933, 2 units
- Designer: Alfieri Maserati

Body and chassis
- Class: Race car
- Layout: Front-engine, rear-wheel-drive

Powertrain
- Engine: 2.8–3.0 L (2,812–2,992 cc) Straight-8; 136 kW (182 bhp) at 5600 rpm
- Transmission: 4-speed manual

Dimensions
- Curb weight: 850 kg (1,870 lb)

Chronology
- Predecessor: Maserati Tipo 26
- Successor: Maserati 8CM

The Maserati 8C was a Grand Prix race car built by Maserati between 1931 and 1933. The 8C was being designed by Alfieri Maserati in the early 1930s; however, he died before its completion.

The chassis was that of the Maserati Tipo 26M, and it was initially fitted with a Tipo 26M engine with its cylinders bored out by 4 mm to arrive at its limit of 2.8 litres (2,812 cc)) for 69 mm × 94 mm (2.7 in × 3.7 in) bore and stroke. Development of the new 3.0 L engine continued and it was constructed for racing in 1932. The car won the 1933 French Grand Prix and Sir Henry Birkin achieved third place driving it in the Tripoli Grand Prix. However, it was not very successful in other races. The car featured some of the world's earliest hydraulic brakes. The Tipo 8C 3000 was the final two-seater Grand Prix Maserati, and was succeeded in 1933 by the Maserati 8CM, M for monoposto (single seat).

In 2000 an original Maserati 8C 2800 sold at an auction for US$1.65 million and a 1932 Maserati 8C 3000 for $1.08 million.

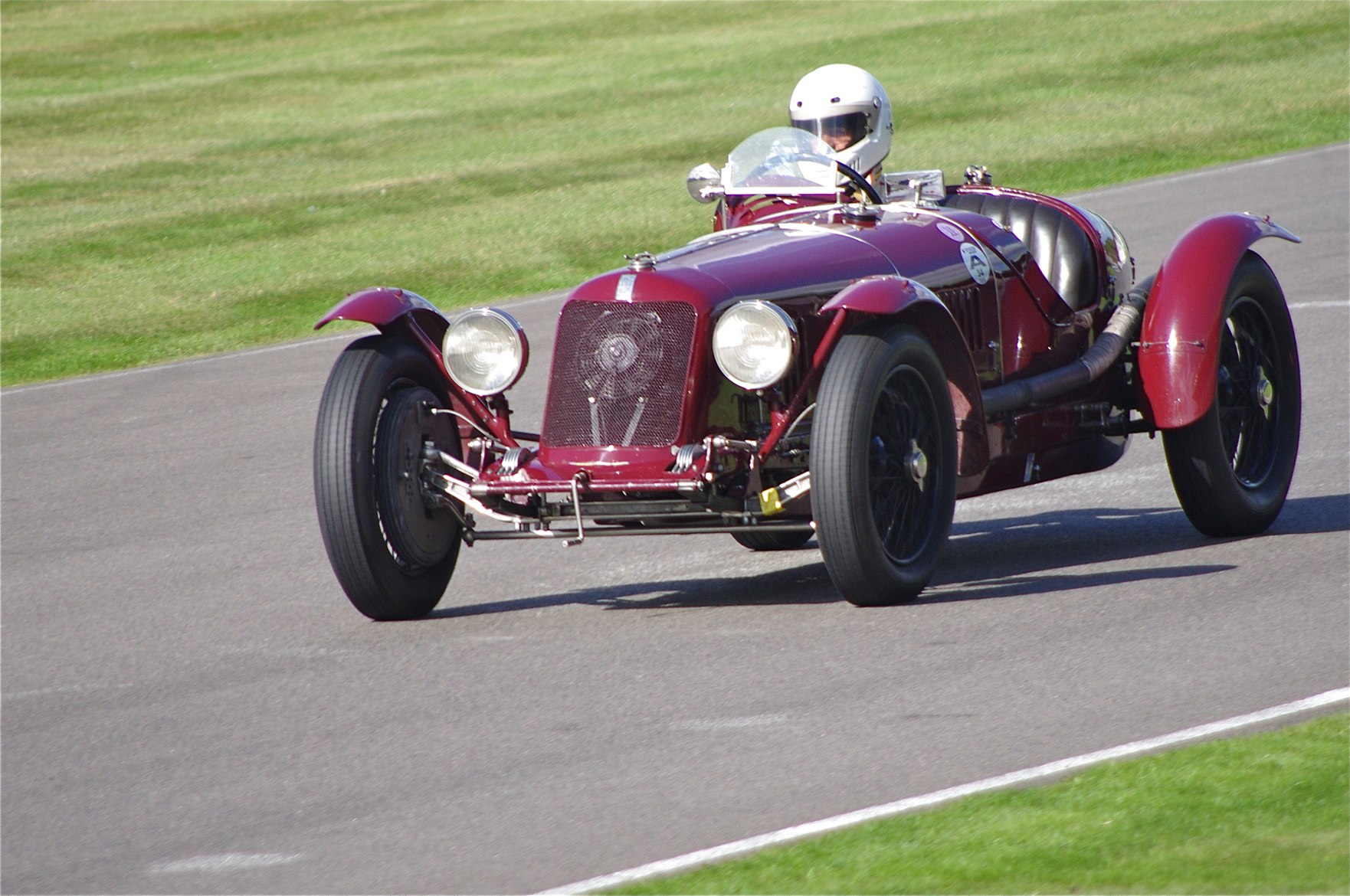
Maserati 8C 3000

== Technical data ==
Technical data	8C 2800	8C 3000
Engine:	Front mounted 8-cylinder in-line engine
Displacement:	2812 cm³	2991 cm³
Bore x stroke:	69 x 94 mm	69 x 100 mm
Max power at rpm:	205 hp at 5 500 rpm	220 hp at 5 500 rpm
Valve control:	2 overhead camshafts, 2 valves per cylinder
Compression:	5,5:1	5.26:1
Carburetor:	Single Weber 55AS1
Upload:	Roots compressor
Gearbox:	4-speed manual
Suspension:	Stiff axles, longitudinal leaf springs
Brakes:	Mechanical drum brakes
Chassis & body:	Box beam frame with aluminum body
Wheelbase:	275 cm
Dry weight:	820 kg
Top speed:	220 km/h	230 km/h
