= 2024 Canadian Grand Prix =

Formula One motor race

Race 9 of 24 in the 2024 Formula One World Championship
← Previous race	Next race →

Race details
- Date: 9 June 2024
- Official name: Formula 1 AWS Grand Prix du Canada 2024
- Location: Circuit Gilles Villeneuve, Montréal, Quebec, Canada
- Course: Semi-permanent racing facility
- Course length: 4.361 km (2.710 miles)
- Distance: 70 laps, 305.270 km (189.686 miles)
- Weather: Rainy at start, dry later
- Attendance: 350,000

Pole position
Driver	(United Kingdom) George Russell	Mercedes
- Time: 1:12.000

Fastest lap
Driver	(United Kingdom) Lewis Hamilton	Mercedes
- Time: 1:14.856 on lap 70

Podium
First	(Netherlands) Max Verstappen	Red Bull Racing-Honda RBPT
Second	(United Kingdom) Lando Norris	McLaren-Mercedes
Third	(United Kingdom) George Russell	Mercedes

The 2024 Canadian Grand Prix (officially known as the Formula 1 AWS Grand Prix du Canada 2024) was a Formula One motor race, which was held on 9 June 2024, at the Circuit Gilles Villeneuve in Montreal, Quebec, Canada. It was the ninth round of the 2024 Formula One World Championship. In a rain affected race, Max Verstappen won his sixtieth Grand Prix, ahead of Lando Norris and George Russell, who scored Mercedes's first Grand Prix podium finish of the season. After struggling in qualifying, with both cars failing to reach Q3 for the first time since the 2021 Belgian Grand Prix, Ferrari suffered their first double DNF since the 2022 Azerbaijan Grand Prix.

Following his victory, coupled with Ferrari not finishing, Verstappen and Red Bull were able to extend their respective leads in the Drivers' and Constructors' Championship to 56 and 49 points over Charles Leclerc and Ferrari, respectively.

== Background ==
The event was held at the Circuit Gilles Villeneuve in Montreal for the 43rd time in the circuit's history, across the weekend of 7–9 June. The Grand Prix was the ninth round of the 2024 Formula One World Championship and the 53rd running of the Canadian Grand Prix as a round of the Formula One World Championship.

=== Championship standings before the race ===
Going into the weekend, Max Verstappen led the Drivers' Championship with 169 points, 31 points ahead of Charles Leclerc in second, and 56 ahead of Lando Norris in third. Red Bull Racing, with 276 points, led the Constructors' Championship from Ferrari and McLaren, who were second and third with 252 and 184 points, respectively.

=== Entrants ===
The drivers and teams were the same as the season entry list with no additional stand-in drivers for the race. Jack Doohan drove for Alpine in the first free practice session, taking the spot of Esteban Ocon.

=== Tyre choices ===
Tyre supplier Pirelli brought the C3, C4, and C5 tyre compounds (the softest three in their range) designated hard, medium, and soft, respectively, for teams to use at the event.

=== Penalties ===
Esteban Ocon of Alpine carried a five-place grid penalty for causing a collision with his teammate Pierre Gasly at the preceding Monaco Grand Prix.

== Practice ==
Three free practice sessions were held for the event. The first free practice session was held on 7 June 2024, at 13:30 local time (UTC−4), and was topped by Lando Norris of McLaren ahead of Carlos Sainz Jr. of Ferrari and his teammate Charles Leclerc. The second free practice session was held on the same day, at 17:00 local time, and was topped by Fernando Alonso of Aston Martin ahead of George Russell of Mercedes and Alonso's teammate Lance Stroll. The third free practice session was held on 8 June 2024, at 12:30 local time, and was topped by Lewis Hamilton of Mercedes ahead of Max Verstappen of Red Bull Racing and Hamilton's teammate Russell.

== Qualifying ==
Qualifying was held on 8 June 2024, at 16:00 local time (UTC−4).

=== Qualifying report ===
George Russell set an identical time to Max Verstappen in Q3 but took pole position by virtue of setting his lap earlier, only the second time that pole position has been decided in such a way since Formula One adopted a three-decimal timing system after the 1997 European Grand Prix.

=== Qualifying classification ===
Pos.	No.	Driver	Constructor	Qualifying times			Final grid
Pos.	No.	Driver	Constructor	Q1	Q2	Q3	Final grid
1	63	(United Kingdom) George Russell	Mercedes	1:13.013	1:11.742	1:12.000	1^{a}
2	1	(Netherlands) Max Verstappen	Red Bull Racing-Honda RBPT	1:12.360	1:12.549	1:12.000	2^{a}
3	4	(United Kingdom) Lando Norris	McLaren-Mercedes	1:12.959	1:12.201	1:12.021	3
4	81	(Australia) Oscar Piastri	McLaren-Mercedes	1:12.907	1:12.462	1:12.103	4
5	3	(Australia) Daniel Ricciardo	RB-Honda RBPT	1:13.240	1:12.572	1:12.178	5
6	14	(Spain) Fernando Alonso	Aston Martin Aramco-Mercedes	1:13.117	1:12.635	1:12.228	6
7	44	(United Kingdom) Lewis Hamilton	Mercedes	1:12.851	1:11.979	1:12.280	7
8	22	(Japan) Yuki Tsunoda	RB-Honda RBPT	1:12.748	1:12.303	1:12.414	8
9	18	(Canada) Lance Stroll	Aston Martin Aramco-Mercedes	1:13.088	1:12.659	1:12.701	9
10	23	(Thailand) Alexander Albon	Williams-Mercedes	1:12.896	1:12.485	1:12.976	10
11	16	(Monaco) Charles Leclerc	Ferrari	1:13.107	1:12.691	N/A	11
12	55	(Spain) Carlos Sainz Jr.	Ferrari	1:13.038	1:12.728	N/A	12
13	2	(United States) Logan Sargeant	Williams-Mercedes	1:13.063	1:12.736	N/A	13
14	20	(Denmark) Kevin Magnussen	Haas-Ferrari	1:13.217	1:12.916	N/A	14
15	10	(France) Pierre Gasly	Alpine-Renault	1:13.289	1:12.940	N/A	15
16	11	(Mexico) Sergio Pérez	Red Bull Racing-Honda RBPT	1:13.326	N/A	N/A	16
17	77	(Finland) Valtteri Bottas	Kick Sauber-Ferrari	1:13.366	N/A	N/A	PL^{b}
18	31	(France) Esteban Ocon	Alpine-Renault	1:13.435	N/A	N/A	18^{c}
19	27	(Germany) Nico Hülkenberg	Haas-Ferrari	1:13.978	N/A	N/A	17
20	24	(China) Zhou Guanyu	Kick Sauber-Ferrari	1:14.292	N/A	N/A	PL^{d}
107% time: 1:17.425

Notes

- ^a – George Russell and Max Verstappen set identical lap times in Q3. Russell got pole position as he set the time earlier.
- ^b – Valtteri Bottas qualified 17th, but was required to start the race from the pit lane as his car was modified during parc fermé conditions.
- ^c – Esteban Ocon received a five-place grid penalty for causing a collision with his teammate Pierre Gasly at the previous round.
- ^d – Zhou Guanyu qualified 20th, but was required to start the race from the pit lane as his car was modified during parc fermé conditions.

== Race ==
The race was held on 9 June 2024, at 14:00 local time (UTC−4), and was run for 70 laps.

=== Race report ===
The Saubers changed their rear wings during parc fermé, relegating them to a pit lane start. The start was held under intermediate conditions, with Haas opting to start their drivers on the wet compound of tyres. While polesitter George Russell kept the lead on the start, Kevin Magnussen immediately benefited from the wet tyres, and he climbed up to as high as fourth while Nico Hülkenberg worked his way up to the points. Charles Leclerc, who had won the previous race at Monaco, suspected engine issues with his Ferrari SF-24, reducing his pace. He was stuck in the midfield for a majority of the race.

On lap eight, the conditions started to change; the rain was clearing up, so drivers switched to the intermediates. Magnussen lost time when his pit crew were not ready with intermediate tyres. Lando Norris passed Max Verstappen using DRS on lap 20, taking him into the lead. However, Logan Sargeant caused a safety car period by spinning out of the chicane at turns 3 and 4 and into retirement. Norris crossed the pit lane entry line too late to enter and change tyres, so other drivers, including Verstappen, gained a tyre advantage. Norris dropped to third behind Verstappen and Russell.

The safety car exited the track on lap 29 as Leclerc, already suffering from power unit issues, switched to hard tyres, dropping him to last place. Leclerc would soon retire from the race, with the power unit issues persisting. On the restart, Verstappen kept the lead ahead of Russell. Meanwhile, Alexander Albon overtook Daniel Ricciardo and Esteban Ocon into the final corner, but he encountered Carlos Sainz Jr. spinning on his way to turn 7. He failed to avoid the Ferrari and he and Sainz were both forced to retire. Ferrari failed to score points for the first time since the 2023 Australian Grand Prix. This was Ferrari's first retirement of the season, and their first double retirement since the 2022 Azerbaijan Grand Prix. Sergio Pérez, who was knocked out in Q1 for the second consecutive race weekend in a row, failed to finish once again after he spun into the wall at turn six, hitting the rear wing of his RB20 and destroying it. His team advised him to limp back to the pits to retire, as leaving the car on the track would risk a safety car. However, the Albon-Sainz incident brought out the second and final safety car period.

The safety car period allowed drivers to change their tyres again. These drivers included Russell and teammate Lewis Hamilton, who went wheel-to-wheel with Russell winning out. Russell also battled Oscar Piastri, with the latter keeping his car on the track as Russell was forced off the track in an incident that was ultimately deemed by stewards as a racing incident. Yuki Tsunoda lost control of his RB and spun across the track, leaving him in a dangerous position on track that he was barely able to escape. This dropped Tsunoda out of the points. Verstappen crossed the line to win the race, his sixtieth career win, ahead of Norris and Russell. Russell's third-place finish was Mercedes's first podium of the season, and his teammate Hamilton scored the fastest lap in fourth.

Under advice from his Red Bull team, as they wanted to avoid a safety car situation, Pérez limped back to the pits in an unsafe condition – his rear wing had already been destroyed, scattering debris on track. Red Bull received a €25,000 penalty for the incident, and Pérez received a three-place grid drop for the following Spanish Grand Prix. The Pérez incident facilitated a rule change for the following season, where cars suffering from a critical failure, be it to the chassis or mechanically, would not have to go to the pit lane; instead, the driver has to park at a nearby safe location to retire the car.

=== Race classification ===
Pos.	No.	Driver	Constructor	Laps	Time/Retired	Grid	Points
1	1	(Netherlands) Max Verstappen	Red Bull Racing-Honda RBPT	70	1:45:47.927	2	25
2	4	(United Kingdom) Lando Norris	McLaren-Mercedes	70	+3.869	3	18
3	63	(United Kingdom) George Russell	Mercedes	70	+4.317	1	15
4	44	(United Kingdom) Lewis Hamilton	Mercedes	70	+4.915	7	13^{a}
5	81	(Australia) Oscar Piastri	McLaren-Mercedes	70	+10.199	4	10
6	14	(Spain) Fernando Alonso	Aston Martin Aramco-Mercedes	70	+17.510	6	8
7	18	(Canada) Lance Stroll	Aston Martin Aramco-Mercedes	70	+23.625	9	6
8	3	(Australia) Daniel Ricciardo	RB-Honda RBPT	70	+28.672	5	4
9	10	(France) Pierre Gasly	Alpine-Renault	70	+30.021	15	2
10	31	(France) Esteban Ocon	Alpine-Renault	70	+30.313	18	1
11	27	(Germany) Nico Hülkenberg	Haas-Ferrari	70	+30.824	17	
12	20	(Denmark) Kevin Magnussen	Haas-Ferrari	70	+31.253	14	
13	77	(Finland) Valtteri Bottas	Kick Sauber-Ferrari	70	+40.487	PL	
14	22	(Japan) Yuki Tsunoda	RB-Honda RBPT	70	+52.694	8	
15	24	(China) Zhou Guanyu	Kick Sauber-Ferrari	69	+1 lap	PL	
Ret	55	(Spain) Carlos Sainz Jr.	Ferrari	52	Collision damage	12	
Ret	23	(Thailand) Alexander Albon	Williams-Mercedes	52	Collision	10	
Ret	11	(Mexico) Sergio Pérez	Red Bull Racing-Honda RBPT	51	Accident damage	16	
Ret	16	(Monaco) Charles Leclerc	Ferrari	40	Engine	11	
Ret	2	(United States) Logan Sargeant	Williams-Mercedes	23	Accident	13	
Fastest lap: (United Kingdom) Lewis Hamilton (Mercedes) – 1:14.856 (lap 70)

Notes

- ^a – Includes one point for fastest lap.

== Championship standings after the race ==
Drivers' Championship standings

Pos.	Driver	Points
1	(Netherlands) Max Verstappen	194
2	(Monaco) Charles Leclerc	138
3	(United Kingdom) Lando Norris	131
4	(Spain) Carlos Sainz Jr.	108
5	(Mexico) Sergio Pérez	107

Constructors' Championship standings

Pos.	Constructor	Points
1	(Austria) Red Bull Racing-Honda RBPT	301
2	(Italy) Ferrari	252
3	(United Kingdom) McLaren-Mercedes	212
4	(Germany) Mercedes	124
5	(United Kingdom) Aston Martin Aramco-Mercedes	58

- Note: Only the top five positions are included for both sets of standings.

Previous race: 2024 Monaco Grand Prix	FIA Formula One World Championship; 2024 season	Next race: 2024 Spanish Grand Prix
Previous race: 2023 Canadian Grand Prix	Canadian Grand Prix	Next race: 2025 Canadian Grand Prix
