= 2024 Monaco Grand Prix =

Formula One motor race

Race 8 of 24 in the 2024 Formula One World Championship
← Previous race	Next race →
- Layout of the Circuit de Monte Carlo, Monaco

Race details
- Date: 26 May 2024
- Official name: Formula 1 Grand Prix de Monaco 2024
- Location: Circuit de Monaco; La Condamine and Monte Carlo, Monaco
- Course: Street circuit
- Course length: 3.337 km (2.074 miles)
- Distance: 78 laps, 260.286 km (161.772 miles)
- Weather: Sunny

Pole position
Driver	(Monaco) Charles Leclerc	Ferrari
- Time: 1:10.270

Fastest lap
Driver	(United Kingdom) Lewis Hamilton	Mercedes
- Time: 1:14.165 on lap 63

Podium
First	(Monaco) Charles Leclerc	Ferrari
Second	(Australia) Oscar Piastri	McLaren-Mercedes
Third	(Spain) Carlos Sainz Jr.	Ferrari

The 2024 Monaco Grand Prix (officially known as the Formula 1 Grand Prix de Monaco 2024) was a Formula One motor race held on 26 May 2024, at the Circuit de Monaco in Monaco. It was the eighth round of the 2024 Formula One World Championship. The race was won by Monégasque Charles Leclerc, his first victory since the 2022 Austrian Grand Prix and his first victory at home, ahead of Oscar Piastri and Ferrari teammate Carlos Sainz, who completed the podium.

Leclerc became the first Monégasque driver since Louis Chiron in 1931 to win his home Grand Prix, as well as the first Monégasque driver to win the Monaco Grand Prix as a Formula One World Championship event. The Grand Prix also marked the first race in the history of the Formula One World Championship to have the top ten drivers finish the race in grid-order, and the first since the 2020 Abu Dhabi Grand Prix to have the top 3 drivers who completed the podium.

== Background ==
The event was held at the Circuit de Monaco in Monaco for the 81st time in the circuit's history, across the weekend of 24–26 May. The Grand Prix was the eighth round of the 2024 Formula One World Championship and the 70th running of the Monaco Grand Prix as a round of the Formula One World Championship.

=== Championship standings before the race ===
Going into the weekend, Max Verstappen led the Drivers' Championship with 161 points, 48 points ahead of Charles Leclerc in second, and 54 ahead of his teammate Sergio Pérez in third. Red Bull Racing, with 267 points, led the Constructors' Championship from Ferrari and McLaren, who were second and third with 212 and 154 points, respectively.

=== Entrants ===
The drivers and teams were the same as the season entry list with no additional stand-in drivers for the race.

=== Tyre choices ===
Tyre supplier Pirelli brought the C3, C4, and C5 tyre compounds (the softest three in their range) designated hard, medium, and soft, respectively, for teams to use at the event.

== Practice ==
Three free practice sessions were held for the event. The first free practice session was held on 24 May 2024, at 13:30 local time (UTC+2), and was topped by Lewis Hamilton of Mercedes ahead of Oscar Piastri of McLaren and Hamilton's teammate George Russell. A brief red flag was observed when debris was scattered across turn 1 after the Sauber of Zhou Guanyu made contact with the wall. The second free practice session was held on the same day, at 17:00 local time, and was topped by Charles Leclerc of Ferrari ahead of Hamilton and Fernando Alonso of Aston Martin. The third free practice session was held on 25 May 2024, at 12:30 local time, and was topped by Leclerc ahead of Max Verstappen of Red Bull Racing and Hamilton. A red flag was observed after the Sauber of Valtteri Bottas struck the wall at the swimming pool section, causing suspension damage.

== Qualifying ==
Qualifying was held on 25 May 2024, at 16:00 local time (UTC+2).

=== Qualifying report ===
The track conditions throughout the qualifying segments were warm and sunny. Fernando Alonso, Logan Sargeant, Sergio Pérez, Valterri Bottas, and Zhou Guanyu were eliminated in Q1. Esteban Ocon, Nico Hülkenberg, Daniel Ricciardo, Lance Stroll, and Kevin Magnussen were eliminated in Q2.

Charles Leclerc took pole position for his home race, his third career pole in Monaco. Oscar Piastri qualified in second, 0.154 seconds behind Leclerc. Carlos Sainz Jr. qualified in third, with Lando Norris and George Russell in fourth and fifth, respectively. Max Verstappen brushed the wall at exit of Sainte Dévote in Q3 and qualified in sixth. Lewis Hamilton, Yuki Tsunoda, Alexander Albon, and Pierre Gasly completed the top ten qualifiers for the race. After an investigation, both Haas drivers Hülkenberg and Magnussen were disqualified from qualifying for breaching the technical regulations.

=== Qualifying classification ===
Pos.	No.	Driver	Constructor	Qualifying times			Final grid
Pos.	No.	Driver	Constructor	Q1	Q2	Q3	Final grid
1	16	(Monaco) Charles Leclerc	Ferrari	1:11.584	1:10.825	1:10.270	1
2	81	(Australia) Oscar Piastri	McLaren-Mercedes	1:11.500	1:10.756	1:10.424	2
3	55	(Spain) Carlos Sainz Jr.	Ferrari	1:11.543	1:11.075	1:10.518	3
4	4	(United Kingdom) Lando Norris	McLaren-Mercedes	1:11.760	1:10.732	1:10.542	4
5	63	(United Kingdom) George Russell	Mercedes	1:11.492	1:10.929	1:10.543	5
6	1	(Netherlands) Max Verstappen	Red Bull Racing-Honda RBPT	1:11.711	1:10.745	1:10.567	6
7	44	(United Kingdom) Lewis Hamilton	Mercedes	1:11.528	1:11.056	1:10.621	7
8	22	(Japan) Yuki Tsunoda	RB-Honda RBPT	1:11.852	1:11.106	1:10.858	8
9	23	(Thailand) Alexander Albon	Williams-Mercedes	1:11.623	1:11.216	1:10.948	9
10	10	(France) Pierre Gasly	Alpine-Renault	1:11.714	1:10.896	1:11.311	10
11	31	(France) Esteban Ocon	Alpine-Renault	1:11.887	1:11.285	N/A	11
12	3	(Australia) Daniel Ricciardo	RB-Honda RBPT	1:11.785	1:11.482	N/A	12
13	18	(Canada) Lance Stroll	Aston Martin Aramco-Mercedes	1:11.728	1:11.563	N/A	13
14	14	(Spain) Fernando Alonso	Aston Martin Aramco-Mercedes	1:12.019	N/A	N/A	14
15	2	(United States) Logan Sargeant	Williams-Mercedes	1:12.020	N/A	N/A	15
16	11	(Mexico) Sergio Pérez	Red Bull Racing-Honda RBPT	1:12.060	N/A	N/A	16
17	77	(Finland) Valtteri Bottas	Kick Sauber-Ferrari	1:12.512	N/A	N/A	17
18	24	(China) Zhou Guanyu	Kick Sauber-Ferrari	1:13.028	N/A	N/A	18
DSQ	27	(Germany) Nico Hülkenberg	Haas-Ferrari	1:11.876	1:11.440	N/A	19^{a}
DSQ	20	(Denmark) Kevin Magnussen	Haas-Ferrari	1:11.832	1:11.725	N/A	20^{a}
107% time: 1:16.496

Notes

- ^a – Nico Hülkenberg and Kevin Magnussen initially qualified 12th and 15th, respectively, but were subsequently disqualified because their DRS was found to not conform with the technical regulations. They were permitted to race at the stewards' discretion.

== Race ==
The race was held on 26 May 2024, at 15:00 local time (UTC+2), and was run for 78 laps.

=== Race report ===
The race was red-flagged on lap 1 after a crash between Sergio Pérez, Nico Hülkenberg and Kevin Magnussen, all of whom retired. Magnussen had brought his car into Pérez's line, which would see the two make contact. Hülkenberg tried to pass the crash, but his rear was struck by Pérez's car. Zhou Guanyu, who was behind the three drivers, slowed down to avoid crashing. The crash resulted in heavy damage to the barriers and a large amount of debris being spread across the first corners. Red Bull estimated a £2.5-3 million cost to repair Pérez's car. Meanwhile, Leclerc's teammate Carlos Sainz Jr. picked up a puncture after contact with second-placed Oscar Piastri and dropped down to sixteenth, running wide into the casino corner, and as the Alpines exited Portier, Esteban Ocon squeezed himself into the path of Pierre Gasly, pitching his own car upward. Ocon, who admitted responsibility for the incident, retired during the red flag period. The stewards investigated the Magnussen and Ocon incidents; deeming the former to be a racing incident, while the latter would later be given a five-place grid penalty for the following Canadian Grand Prix. Sainz, who was running in sixteenth, benefitted from the red flag facilitating a grid reset, as Zhou had not passed the first timing sector before the race was suspended.

The early red flag was a big deciding factor for the rest of the race strategy - drivers were able to swap to a second tyre compound during the red flag, eliminating the need for pit stops for the rest of the race. Of the top ten, only Hamilton and Verstappen made further pit stops after gaining a wide enough lead over Tsunoda to do so without losing track position. The resulting no-stop strategy required a very slow pace from the drivers in order to manage tyres, with Piastri commenting that at one point the pace was "slower than Formula 2." The following season, the FIA passed a new rule requiring all drivers to run three different sets of tyres at Monaco alongside the usual rules of two different compounds, with the explicit goal of making the race more entertaining.

Leclerc kept the lead following the restart to win the race ahead of Piastri, who scored his first podium of the season for McLaren, Sainz, and Lando Norris. This was Leclerc's first race win since the 2022 Austrian Grand Prix, and Ferrari's first victory in Monaco since Sebastian Vettel took the win in the 2017 edition of the race. Leclerc became the first Monégasque driver since Louis Chiron in 1931 to win his home Grand Prix, and the first to win it as a Formula One World Championship event.

The result enabled Leclerc to reduce the points deficit to Verstappen to 31 points. Following his first-lap-retirement which caused an early red flag, Sergio Pérez was demoted from third to fifth, as Lando Norris and Carlos Sainz Jr. advanced one position each in the standings. Ferrari closed the gap in the World Constructors' Championship to 24 points over Red Bull, with McLaren nearly 100 points behind Red Bull in third.

=== Race classification ===
Pos.	No.	Driver	Constructor	Laps	Time/Retired	Grid	Points
1	16	(Monaco) Charles Leclerc	Ferrari	78	2:23:15.554	1	25
2	81	(Australia) Oscar Piastri	McLaren-Mercedes	78	+7.152	2	18
3	55	(Spain) Carlos Sainz Jr.	Ferrari	78	+7.585	3	15
4	4	(United Kingdom) Lando Norris	McLaren-Mercedes	78	+8.650	4	12
5	63	(United Kingdom) George Russell	Mercedes	78	+13.309	5	10
6	1	(Netherlands) Max Verstappen	Red Bull Racing-Honda RBPT	78	+13.853	6	8
7	44	(United Kingdom) Lewis Hamilton	Mercedes	78	+14.908	7	7^{b}
8	22	(Japan) Yuki Tsunoda	RB-Honda RBPT	77	+1 lap	8	4
9	23	(Thailand) Alexander Albon	Williams-Mercedes	77	+1 lap	9	2
10	10	(France) Pierre Gasly	Alpine-Renault	77	+1 lap	10	1
11	14	(Spain) Fernando Alonso	Aston Martin Aramco-Mercedes	76	+2 laps	14	
12	3	(Australia) Daniel Ricciardo	RB-Honda RBPT	76	+2 laps	12	
13	77	(Finland) Valtteri Bottas	Kick Sauber-Ferrari	76	+2 laps	17	
14	18	(Canada) Lance Stroll	Aston Martin Aramco-Mercedes	76	+2 laps	13	
15	2	(United States) Logan Sargeant	Williams-Mercedes	76	+2 laps	15	
16	24	(China) Zhou Guanyu	Kick Sauber-Ferrari	76	+2 laps	18	
Ret	31	(France) Esteban Ocon	Alpine-Renault	0	Collision damage	11	
Ret	11	(Mexico) Sergio Pérez	Red Bull Racing-Honda RBPT	0	Collision	16	
Ret	27	(Germany) Nico Hülkenberg	Haas-Ferrari	0	Collision	19	
Ret	20	(Denmark) Kevin Magnussen	Haas-Ferrari	0	Collision	20	
Fastest lap: (United Kingdom) Lewis Hamilton (Mercedes) – 1:14.165 (lap 63)

Notes

- ^b – Includes one point for fastest lap.

== Championship standings after the race ==
Drivers' Championship standings

	Pos.	Driver	Points
	1	(Netherlands) Max Verstappen	169
	2	(Monaco) Charles Leclerc	138
1	3	(United Kingdom) Lando Norris	113
1	4	(Spain) Carlos Sainz Jr.	108
2	5	(Mexico) Sergio Pérez	107

Constructors' Championship standings

Pos.	Constructor	Points
1	(Austria) Red Bull Racing-Honda RBPT	276
2	(Italy) Ferrari	252
3	(United Kingdom) McLaren-Mercedes	184
4	(Germany) Mercedes	96
5	(United Kingdom) Aston Martin Aramco-Mercedes	44

- Note: Only the top five positions are included for both sets of standings.

== See also ==
- 2024 Monte Carlo Formula 2 round
- 2024 Monte Carlo Formula 3 round

Previous race: 2024 Emilia Romagna Grand Prix	FIA Formula One World Championship; 2024 season	Next race: 2024 Canadian Grand Prix
Previous race: 2023 Monaco Grand Prix	Monaco Grand Prix	Next race: 2025 Monaco Grand Prix
