= Esteban Ocon =

French racing driver (born 1996)

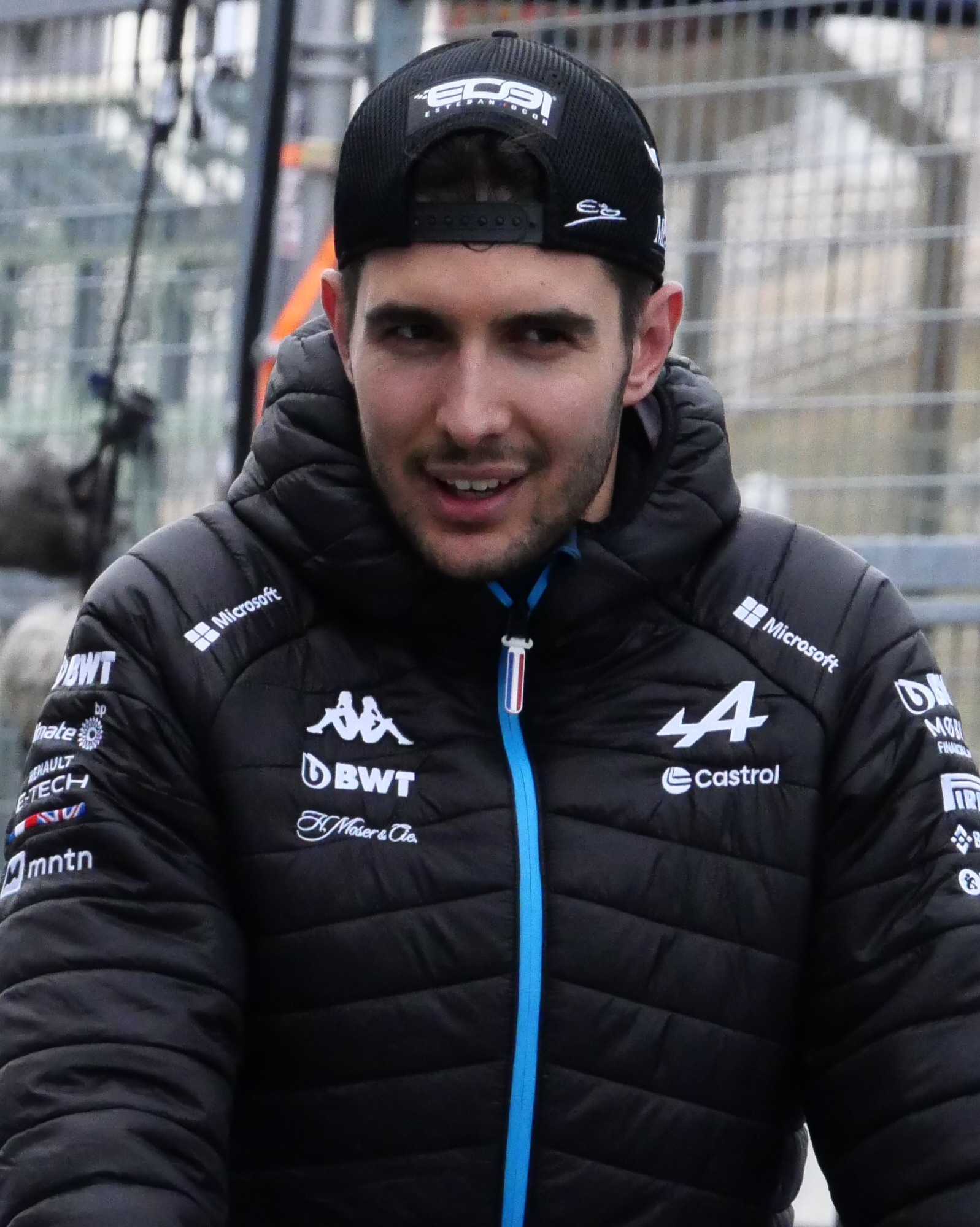
- Ocon at the 2024 Japanese Grand Prix
- Born: Esteban José Jean-Pierre Ocon-Khelfane; 17 September 1996 (age 30); Évreux, Eure, France
- Partners: Flavy Barla (2023–present)

Formula One World Championship career
- Nationality: (France) French
- 2026 team: Haas-Ferrari
- Car number: 31
- Entries: 199 (198 starts)
- Championships: 0
- Wins: 1
- Podiums: 4
- Career points: 490
- Pole positions: 0
- Fastest laps: 1
- First entry: 2016 Belgian Grand Prix
- First win: 2021 Hungarian Grand Prix
- Last entry: 2026 Mexico City Grand Prix
- 2025 position: 15th (38 pts)

Previous series
- 2016; 2015; 2014; 2012–2013; 2013; 2012: DTM; GP3 Series; FIA F3 European; Formula Renault Eurocup; Formula Renault NEC; Formula Renault 2.0 Alps

Championship titles
- 2015; 2014: GP3 Series; FIA F3 European
- Website: esteban-ocon.com

Esteban José Jean-Pierre Ocon-Khelfane (French pronunciation: [ɛs.te.ban ɔ.kɔ̃]; born 17 September 1996) is a French racing driver who most recently competed in Formula One for Haas. Ocon won the 2021 Hungarian Grand Prix with Alpine.

Born and raised in Normandy to a working-class family, Ocon began competitive kart racing aged nine, winning several national and international titles. Graduating to junior formulae in 2012, Ocon won his first title at the 2014 FIA Formula 3 European Championship with Prema, ahead of Tom Blomqvist and Max Verstappen. Ocon then won the 2015 GP3 Series with ART, achieving 14 podiums in 18 races. A member of the Mercedes Junior Team since 2015, Ocon made his Formula One debut at the 2016 Belgian Grand Prix with Manor, replacing Rio Haryanto for the remainder of the 2016 season. He moved to Force India—who later became Racing Point—in 2017, partnering Sergio Pérez. Ocon left Racing Point at the end of 2018, becoming a reserve driver for Mercedes in 2019.

Ocon returned as a full-time driver with Renault in 2020, taking his maiden podium finish at the Sakhir Grand Prix. Retaining his seat for 2021, Ocon partnered Fernando Alonso at the re-branded Alpine, taking his maiden victory at the Hungarian Grand Prix. After a less successful 2022 campaign, during which he became the first teammate to outscore Alonso in the championship since Jenson Button in 2015, Ocon achieved his third podium at the 2023 Monaco Grand Prix. In 2024—his final season at Alpine—Ocon achieved his maiden fastest lap in the United States, followed by a fourth career podium at the rain-affected São Paulo Grand Prix. He left Alpine after the Qatar Grand Prix, moving to Haas for 2025 alongside Oliver Bearman, prior to another early departure in 2026. Ocon achieved one race win, one fastest lap and four podiums in Formula One.

== Early and personal life ==
Esteban José Jean-Pierre Ocon-Khelfane was born on 17 September 1996 in Évreux, Normandy to Sabrina Khelfane and Laurent Ocon, a mechanic who owns a garage in Évreux. His paternal family is originally from Málaga, Spain, and his mother has roots in Algeria. While competing in karting, his parents decided to sell their family home, which included his father's garage, to fund his karting career. After selling the house, they lived and travelled to races in a caravan Ocon also used as a motor home. Ocon admitted that he almost gave up on his racing career to work at McDonald's.

As of 2022, Ocon lives in Geneva, Switzerland. Besides his native French language, Ocon also speaks English, Spanish and Italian. In 2023 Ocon began a relationship with model, social media influencer, medical student and former Miss Côte d'Azur Flavy Barla having split with his previous girlfriend Elena Berri (whom he had started dating in 2018) earlier in 2023.

== Junior racing career ==
=== Karting (2006–2011) ===
Ocon entered karting in 2006, when he finished eighth in the Minime class of the French Championship. He won the championship in 2007 and continued his success by winning the Cadet class in 2008 ahead of Anthoine Hubert and Pierre Gasly. He then spent three years racing in the KF3 category and competed in the Spanish Championship and Italian Open Masters. He won the French KF3 title in 2010 and finished as runner-up in the WSK Euro Series in 2011 behind Max Verstappen. At the age of 14, Ocon was signed by Gravity Sports management, a sister company of Renault F1 team.

=== Formula Renault 2.0 (2012–2013) ===
==== 2012: Junior formulae debut ====
In 2012, Ocon made his debut in single-seaters, taking part in the Eurocup Formula Renault 2.0 with Koiranen Motorsport. He finished fourteenth with four point-scoring finishes, including being on the podium at his home round at Circuit Paul Ricard. He also contested a partial campaign in the Formula Renault 2.0 Alps with Koiranen, finishing seventh with two podiums, both of which came at the Red Bull Ring.

==== 2013: Maiden victories in the Eurocup and Northern European Cup ====
Ocon remained in the series for 2013, switching to the ART Junior Team. He recorded one pole position and won two races including at Circuit Paul Ricard, finishing the season in third place behind Pierre Gasly and Oliver Rowland. A partial campaign in the Northern European Cup produced a race win at the Hockenheimring and two further podiums.

=== Formula Three (2013–2014) ===
==== 2013: F3 debut at Macau ====
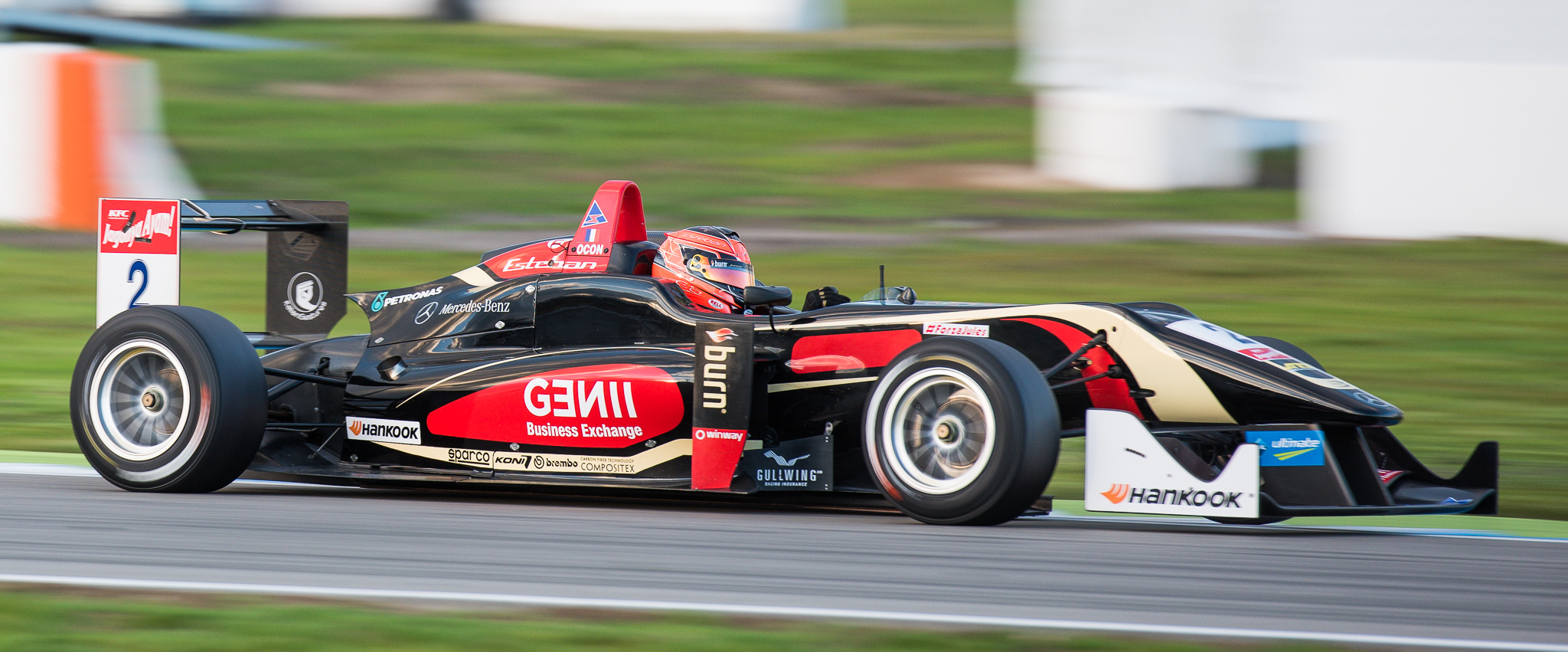
Esteban Ocon in F3 – Hockenheimring 2014

Ocon made his debut in Formula Three machinery at the 2013 Macau Grand Prix with Prema Powerteam. He stalled at the start of the main race but went on to finish tenth.

==== 2014: Maiden title in FIA European F3 ====
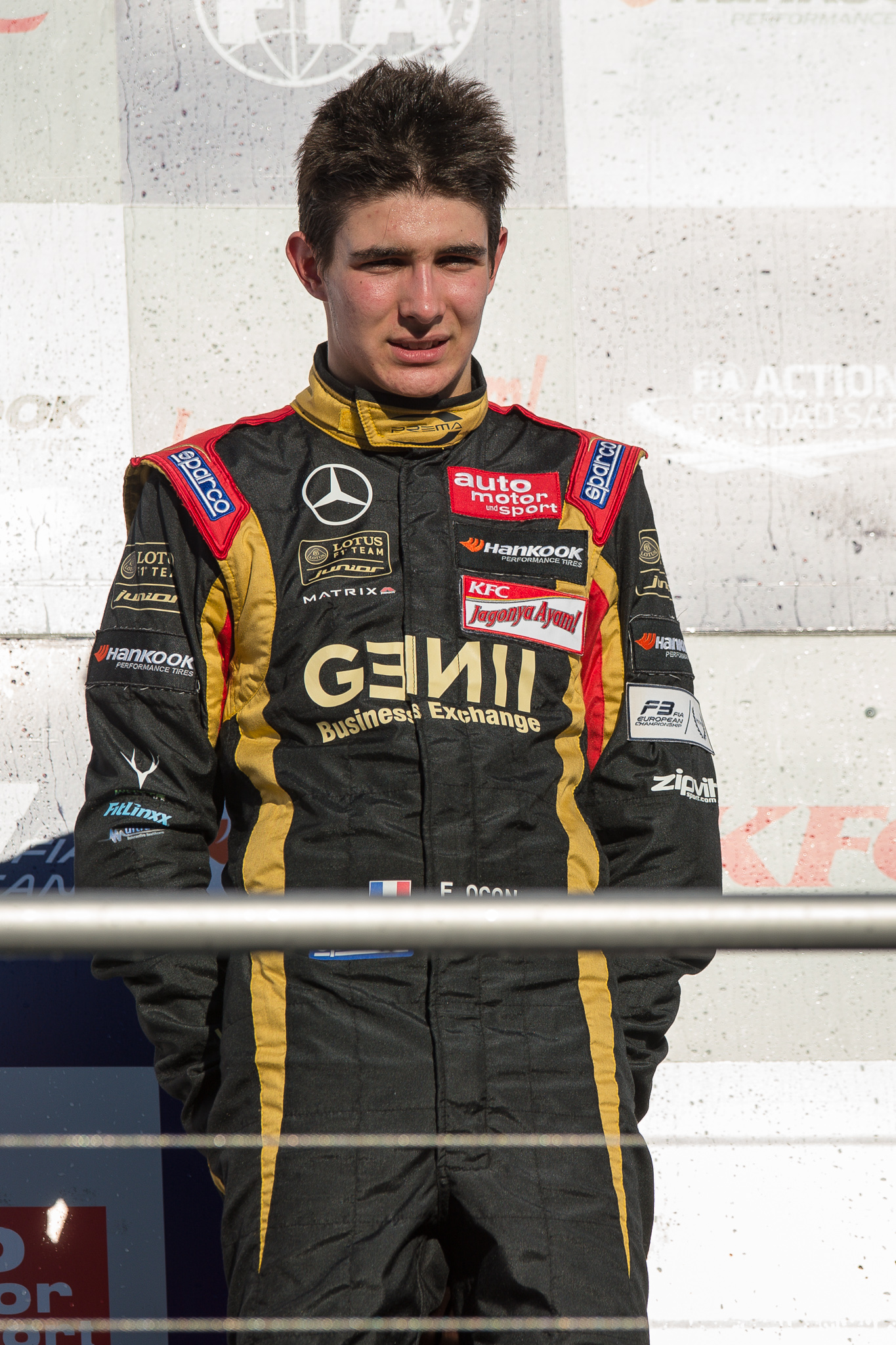
Ocon on the podium at the 2014 F3 European Hockenheimring round

Ocon continued his collaboration with Prema into the 2014 FIA Formula 3 European Championship. He topped the standings at the first round at Silverstone Circuit and remained in the lead of the championship for the rest of the season. With two rounds to spare, he made a brief appearance in the 2014 Formula Renault 3.5 Series with Comtec Racing. Ocon was crowned FIA Formula 3 European champion with three races remaining, ahead of Tom Blomqvist and Max Verstappen. He finished on the podium in twenty-one of the thirty-three races, winning nine, and recorded fifteen pole positions. Ocon made a second appearance at the Macau Grand Prix in 2014. He qualified fourth for the main race but was eliminated by a multi-car collision on the first lap.

=== GP3 Series (2015) ===
Ocon moved to the GP3 Series for 2015 with ART Grand Prix. Despite only scoring one race victory (two other victories were denied due to penalties), he won the championship by eight points ahead of Luca Ghiotto. Ocon recorded three pole positions and fourteen podium finishes (including nine consecutive second-places) from eighteen races.

=== DTM (2016) ===
Ocon drove for Mercedes-Benz in the first ten races of the 2016 DTM season, alongside his Formula One reserve driver role at Renault. He scored two points finishing ninth in the first race at Circuit Zandvoort, before he was promoted to a Formula 1 race seat. He was replaced by Felix Rosenqvist following his promotion.

== Formula One career ==
=== Test driver (2014–2016) ===
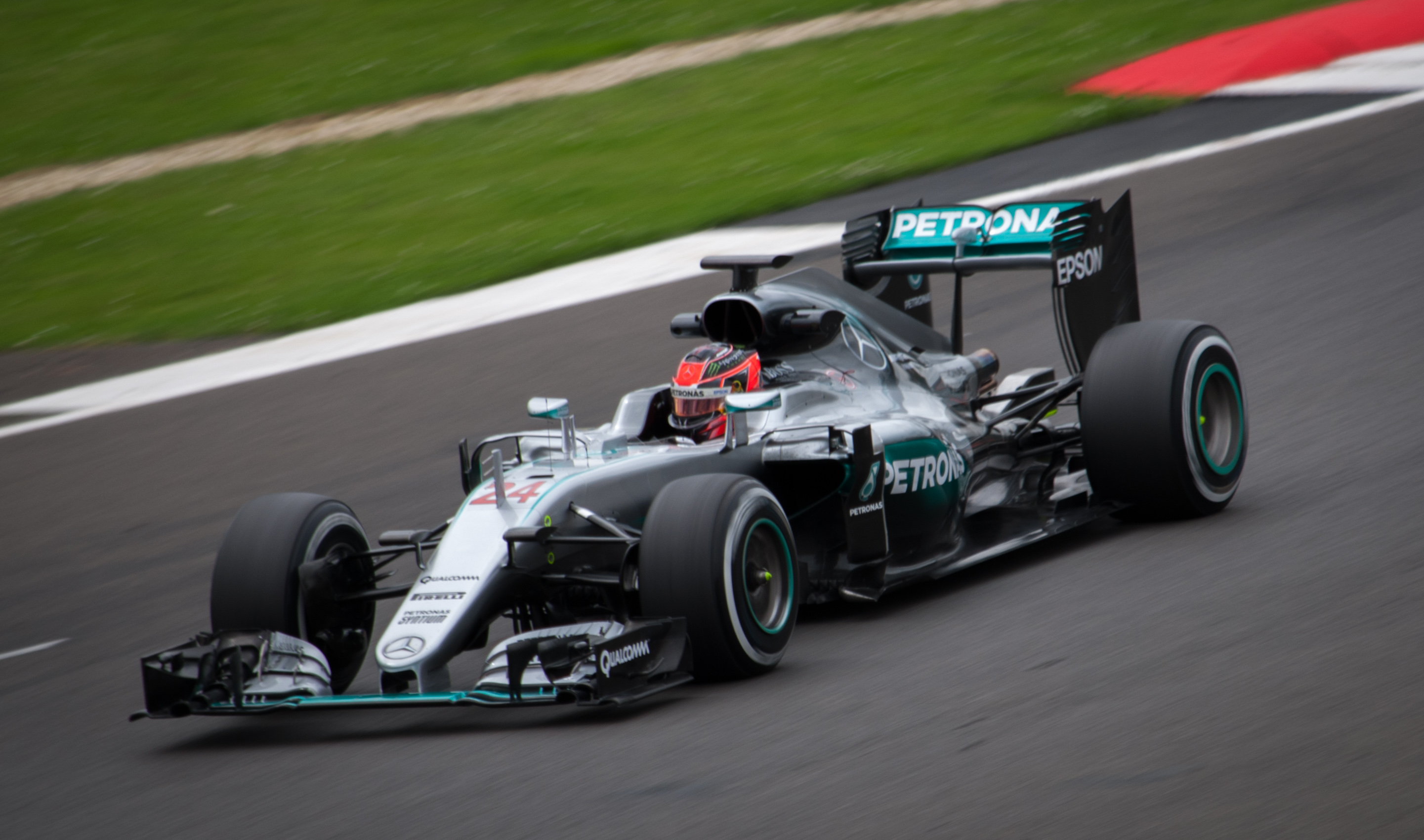
Ocon driving the Mercedes F1 W07 Hybrid

Ocon was signed to Lotus F1 Team's driver development programme in 2010 whilst he was competing in karting. In October 2014, as a reward for winning the FIA Formula 3 European Championship, Lotus gave him his first experience of a Formula One car; he completed a two-day test at Circuit Ricardo Tormo, driving the 2012 Lotus E20. A week later, he completed another test as a prize for his championship victory, driving the 2010 Ferrari F10 at Fiorano Circuit. In November, Ocon made his Grand Prix weekend debut for Lotus during the first practice (FP1) session at the Abu Dhabi Grand Prix.

In May 2015, Ocon entered into an agreement with Mercedes; he would receive the team's support for his upcoming GP3 Series campaign and would also serve as Mercedes' test and reserve driver in the DTM championship. Mercedes team principal Toto Wolff described Ocon as "mega-talented" and commented that the team would be "watching [his] progress with a lot of interest". Shortly afterwards, Ocon was called up by Force India to drive the VJM08 at the in-season test at the Circuit de Barcelona-Catalunya after Pascal Wehrlein was forced to withdraw due to illness. He completed another test for Force India at the Red Bull Ring in June. In November, Mercedes exercised a contract option to retain Ocon as part of their programme.

In February 2016 it was announced that Ocon would be loaned to Renault, formerly Lotus, to act as their reserve driver for the 2016 season. He made four FP1 appearances for Renault at the Spanish, British, Hungarian and German Grands Prix. He drove a Mercedes for the first time in July, piloting the championship-leading W07 at the in-season test at Silverstone Circuit and setting the fastest time on the final morning of the test.

=== Manor (2016) ===
==== 2016 season ====
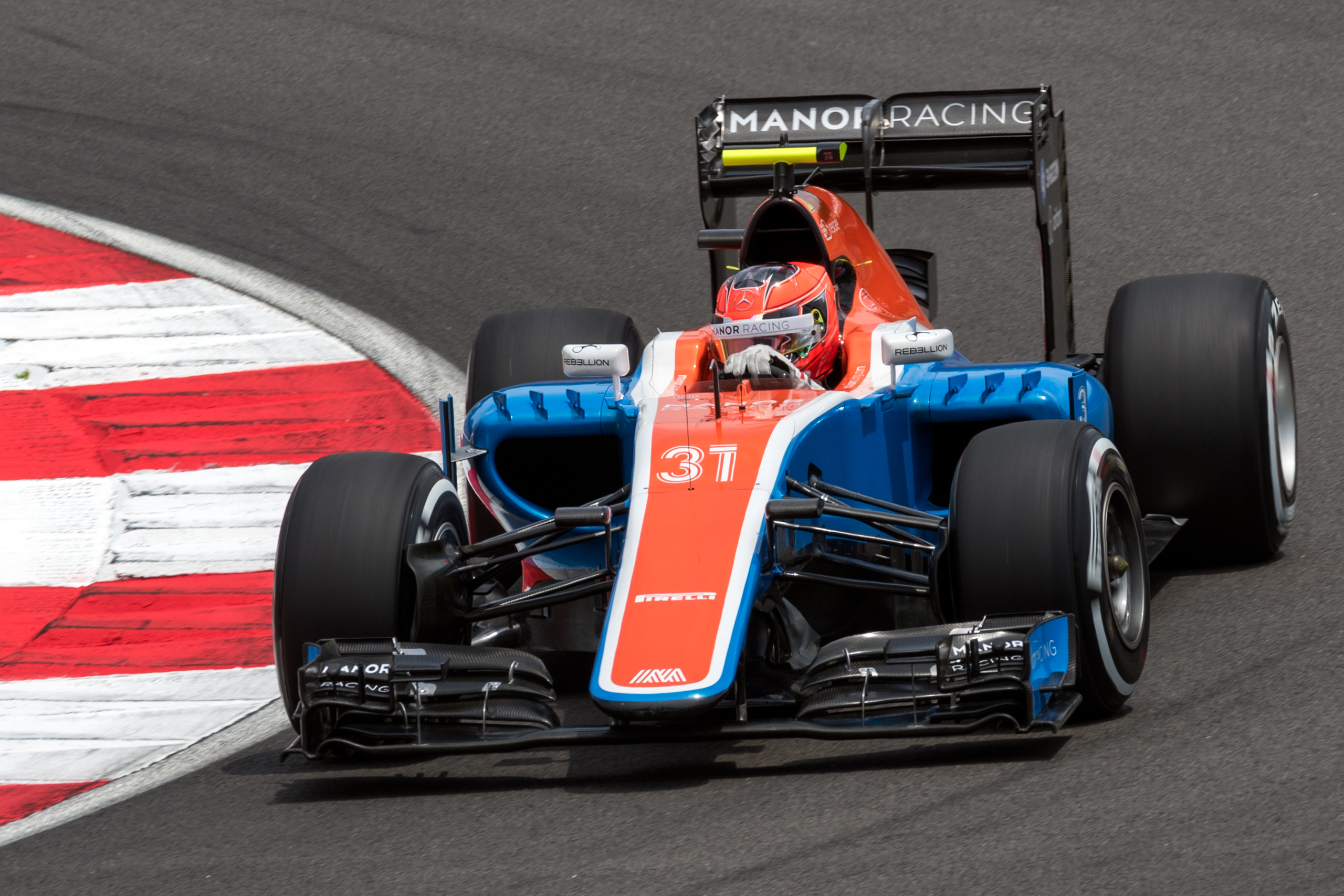
Ocon driving for Manor at the 2016 Malaysian Grand Prix

In August 2016, Rio Haryanto was dropped from the backmarker Manor Racing team after his sponsors had failed to meet their contractual obligations. Ocon was named as his replacement for the second half of the season, driving alongside fellow Mercedes junior Pascal Wehrlein. Ocon made his Formula One debut at the Belgian Grand Prix, qualifying eighteenth and finishing sixteenth. He earned his best result of twelfth in the rain-affected Brazilian Grand Prix, dropping out of the points positions on the final lap. He then finished thirteenth at the season-ending Abu Dhabi Grand Prix. These results placed Ocon 23rd in the Drivers' Championship, ahead of Haryanto, who had recorded a best finish of fifteenth place.

=== Force India (2017–2018) ===
==== 2017 season ====
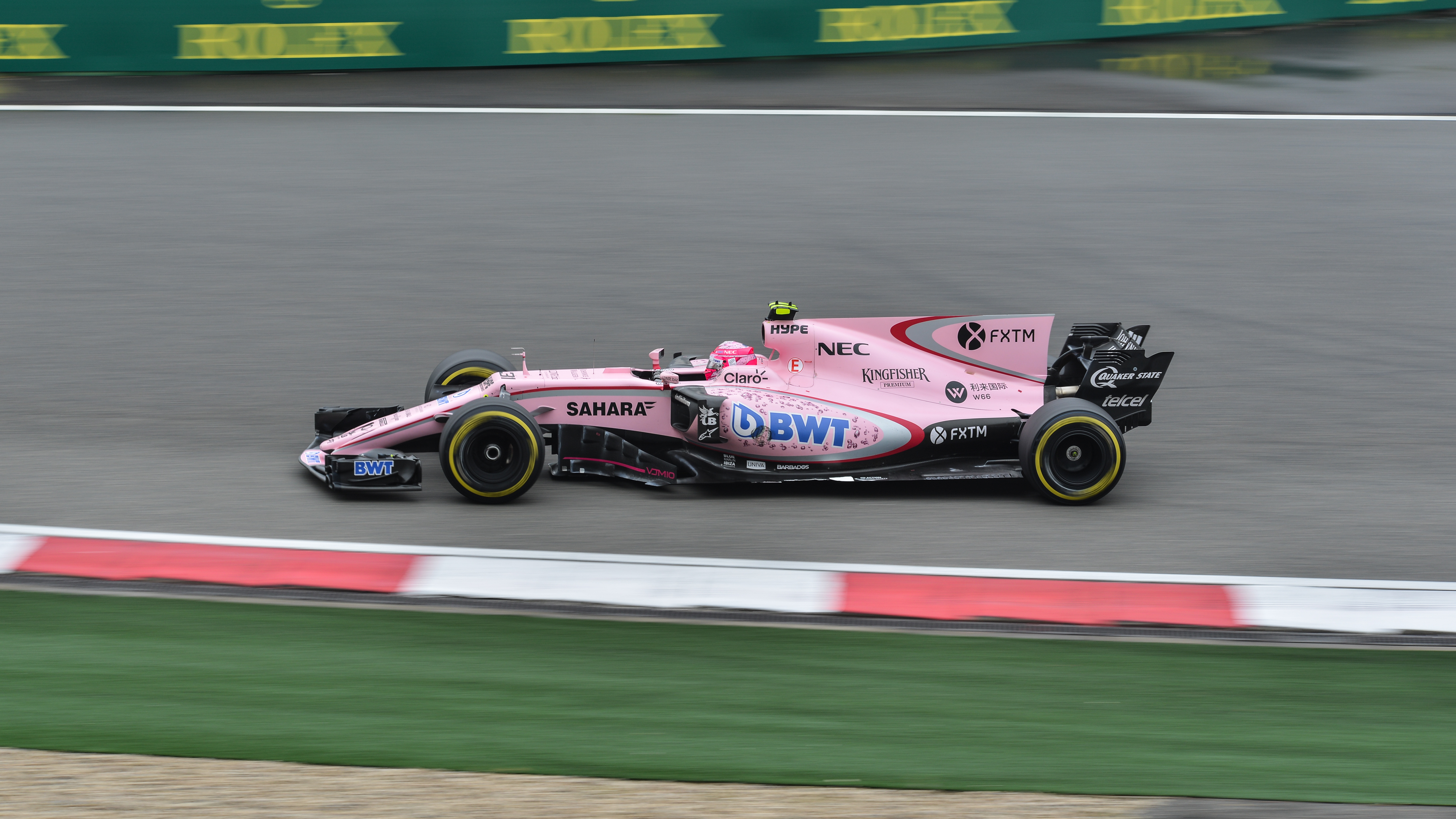
Ocon driving for Force India at the 2017 Chinese Grand Prix

Amidst speculation that he would be promoted to a Renault race seat for 2017, Ocon expressed a desire to be part of the team's long-term future and described himself as "a Renault driver, but managed by Mercedes". Renault managing director Cyril Abiteboul stated that Ocon was still a candidate for a seat at the team despite his Mercedes links. In November 2016, it was announced that Mercedes engine customer Force India had signed Ocon on a multi-year contract, with Sergio Pérez as his new teammate for the 2017 season.

Ocon scored his first Formula One point in his first race for Force India, finishing tenth at the Australian Grand Prix. He followed this with four further points finishes including a career-best fifth place at the Spanish Grand Prix. Following a twelfth place finish at the Monaco Grand Prix, Ocon recorded twelve consecutive points finishes but was often involved in incidents with teammate Pérez. At the Canadian Grand Prix, Pérez ignored requests from the team to let Ocon past to challenge Daniel Ricciardo for third place. The two drivers collided at the Azerbaijan Grand Prix, forcing Pérez into retirement and giving Ocon a puncture. They made contact at the Hungarian Grand Prix and then again at the Belgian Grand Prix, where Ocon was squeezed towards a wall leading up to the Eau Rouge complex. Ocon later remarked that he was "furious" with Pérez and that he "risked [their] lives". Force India team owner Vijay Mallya stated that the repeated incidents were "very concerning" and that he would enforce team orders thereon.

Ocon started the Italian Grand Prix in third place after the Red Bull drivers faced penalties, the highest grid position of his career. He went on to finish the race sixth. He spent much of the Mexican Grand Prix in third place and eventually finished fifth. His streak of finishing twenty-seven consecutive races ended at the Brazilian Grand Prix, where he collided with Romain Grosjean on the first lap. He finished his first full season in Formula One eighth in the World Drivers' Championship, scoring 87 points to Pérez's 100. A poll of the Formula One team principals ranked Ocon the fifth-best driver of the season. James Allen of Motorsport.com also placed Ocon in his top five, remarking that "by the second half of the season Ocon was beating Pérez regularly".

==== 2018 season ====
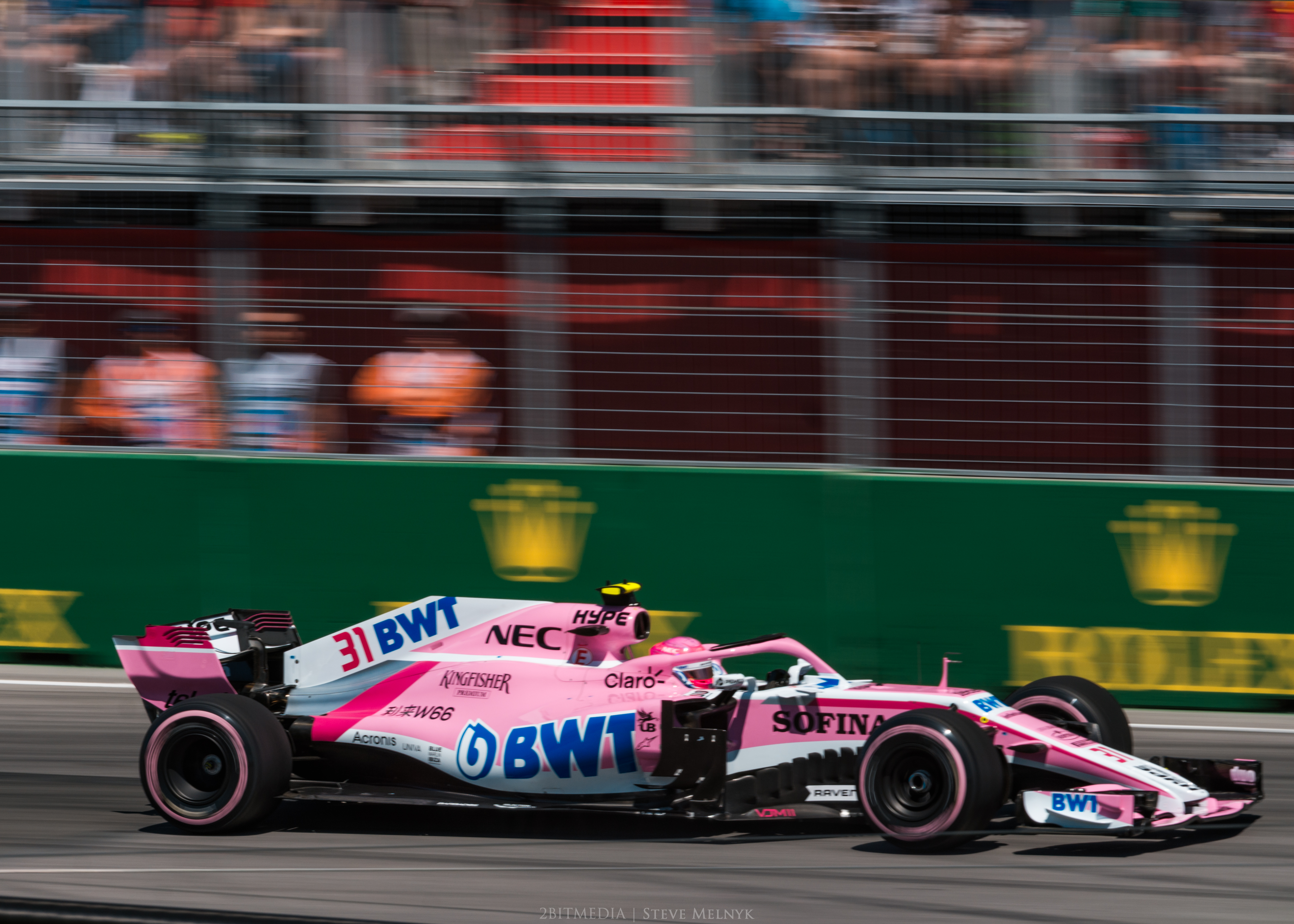
Ocon at the 2018 Canadian Grand Prix

Ocon continued alongside Pérez at Force India in 2018. Ocon's first points of the season came with a tenth-place finish at the Bahrain Grand Prix. At the Azerbaijan Grand Prix, he was involved in a first-lap collision with Kimi Räikkönen that ended his race, whilst teammate Pérez went on to claim a podium finish. Ocon retired with an oil leak at the next race, the Spanish Grand Prix. He recorded five more points finishes before the summer break, including sixth-place finishes at the Monaco and Austrian Grands Prix, but retired from his home race, the French Grand Prix, after a first-lap collision with Pierre Gasly.

Following the Hungarian Grand Prix in July, Force India's financial problems had forced it into administration. The team's assets were purchased by a consortium of investors led by businessman Lawrence Stroll — father of Williams driver Lance Stroll — and a new entry was formed under the name Racing Point Force India. The new owners would retain Ocon and Pérez for the remainder of the season.

At the next race, the Belgian Grand Prix, Ocon achieved the joint-highest starting position of his career with third and went on to finish sixth. Ocon and Pérez collided on the first lap of the Singapore Grand Prix, causing Ocon to crash into a wall and retire from the race. The team described the collision as "unacceptable" and banned the drivers from racing each other. Pérez later apologised for his role in the accident. Ocon was disqualified from eighth place at the United States Grand Prix after his car was found to have exceeded fuel flow limits. At the Brazilian Grand Prix, he collided with race leader Max Verstappen whilst attempting to un-lap himself, damaging both cars. Both drivers were able to continue racing and Ocon received a ten-second stop-and-go penalty for the incident. They argued just after the race (in which Verstappen finished second) and pushed each other several times. Both drivers were summoned by the FIA and Verstappen was ordered to undertake two days of public service "at the discretion of the FIA" for making deliberate physical contact with Ocon.

Ocon finished the season twelfth in the World Drivers' Championship, scoring 49 points to Pérez's 62 and qualifying ahead of Pérez at sixteen of the twenty-one races. Keith Collantine of RaceFans commented that Ocon "convincingly beat his team mate over the course of the season" but that Pérez’s superior "sense of self-preservation" contributed to his higher points tally.

=== Mercedes reserve driver (2019) ===
After Force India changed ownership in 2018, it was revealed that Ocon had an "informal agreement" to join Renault for 2019. Renault instead unexpectedly signed Daniel Ricciardo, leaving Ocon's future in doubt and attracting criticism from Mercedes team principal Toto Wolff. Ocon's seat at Force India (now Racing Point) was taken by Lance Stroll. Other teams were said to have been reluctant to hire a Mercedes-contracted driver, but Wolff was unwilling to release Ocon, predicting that "one day he is going to be in a Mercedes and win races and championships".

Left without a race seat for 2019, Ocon and his management decided against racing in a different series and he was instead placed in a reserve driver role with Mercedes. He performed simulator work for the team and drove the W10 in two Pirelli tyre tests. He claimed to have been in discussions with Mercedes for the 2020 season, remarking that he was "very close" to replacing Valtteri Bottas at the team. Mercedes ultimately decided to continue with Bottas.

=== Renault / Alpine (2020–2024) ===
==== 2020: Maiden podium ====
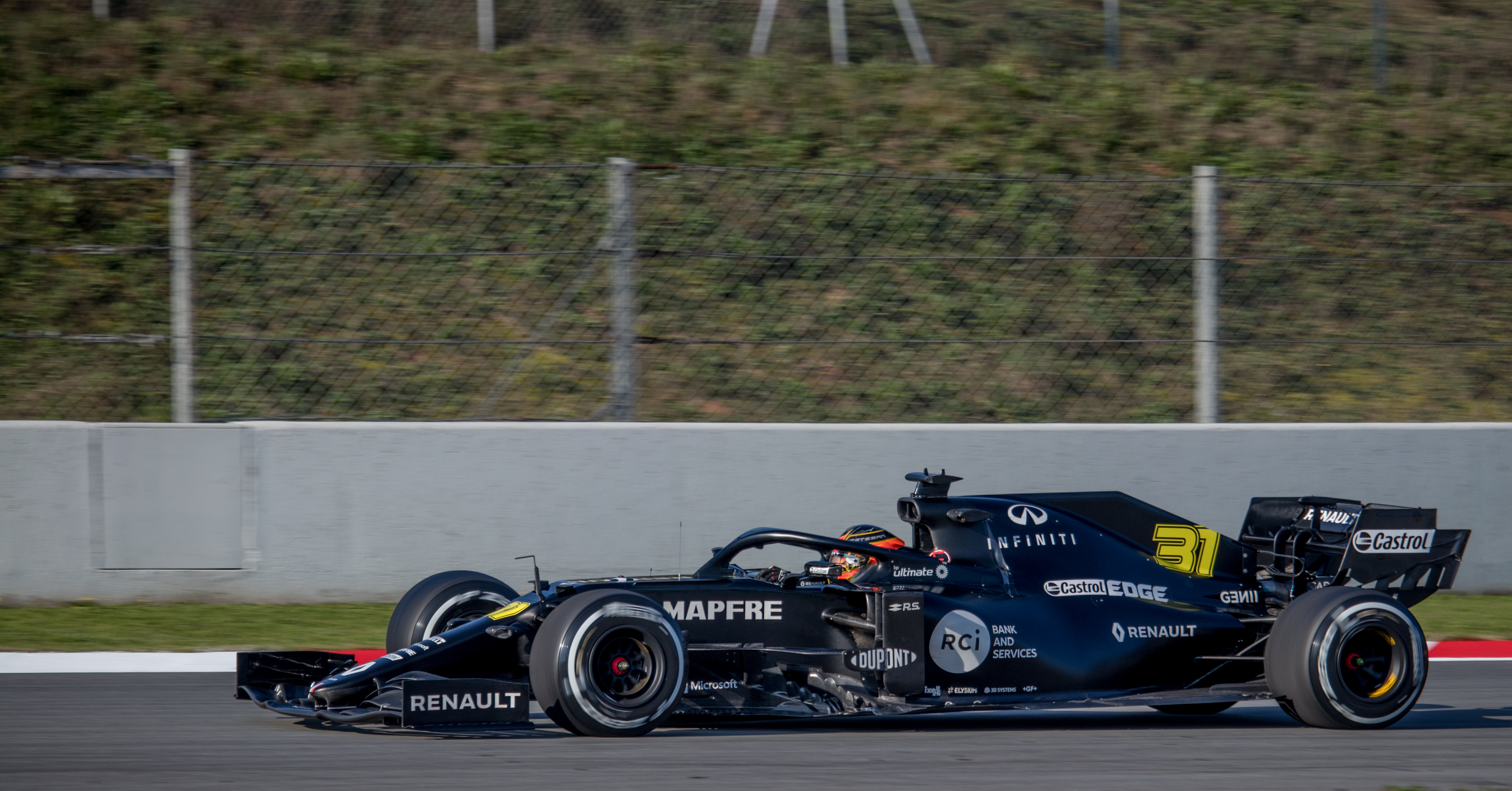
Ocon during pre-season testing in 2020

It was announced in August 2019 that Ocon would join Renault for 2020, signing a two-year contract and marking his return to Formula One as a full-time driver. He replaced Nico Hülkenberg and was partnered with Daniel Ricciardo. Renault managing director Cyril Abiteboul clarified that whilst Ocon was still managed by Mercedes, this was not a loan agreement and he would be a "fully-fledged Renault driver".

Ocon scored points on his Renault debut at the Austrian Grand Prix, qualifying fourteenth and finishing eighth. He was running in seventh place at the Styrian Grand Prix when he retired with a cooling issue. He scored back-to-back points at Silverstone Circuit with sixth place at the British Grand Prix and eighth place at the 70th Anniversary Grand Prix, despite being issued a grid penalty at the latter for impeding George Russell in qualifying. His best race finish since 2017 came at the Belgian Grand Prix, where he qualified sixth and finished fifth behind teammate Ricciardo.

Ocon's brakes caught fire during a safety car period at the Tuscan Grand Prix. The team was unable to repair the damage during the red flag period which occurred soon after, and Ocon failed to make the restart. He experienced further mechanical retirements at the Eifel Grand Prix and the Emilia Romagna Grand Prix. He qualified seventh for the Turkish Grand Prix and made his way into third place by the first corner, but separate collisions with Ricciardo and Valtteri Bottas resulted in him finishing outside the points in eleventh place.

Ocon started eleventh at the Sakhir Grand Prix. He had improved to fifth place by lap 54 of 87, assisted by collisions on the opening lap and drivers making second pit stops. A virtual safety car (VSC) period followed, which third-placed Carlos Sainz Jr. and fourth-placed Ricciardo attempted to take advantage of by entering the pits. However, the VSC period ended whilst they were in the pit lane, nullifying their advantage and promoting Ocon to third place. He was soon overtaken by Sergio Pérez, however pit stop issues for the leading Mercedes cars allowed Ocon to claim his first Formula One podium by finishing second, Renault's best race result since 2010.

Ocon ended the season twelfth in the World Drivers' Championship, scoring 62 points to Ricciardo's 119. Ocon described his progress over the season as "strong", however Luke Slater at The Telegraph described his performance in comparison to Ricciardo as "decent but largely outclassed", having been outqualified by Ricciardo fifteen times in seventeen races.

==== 2021: Maiden victory ====
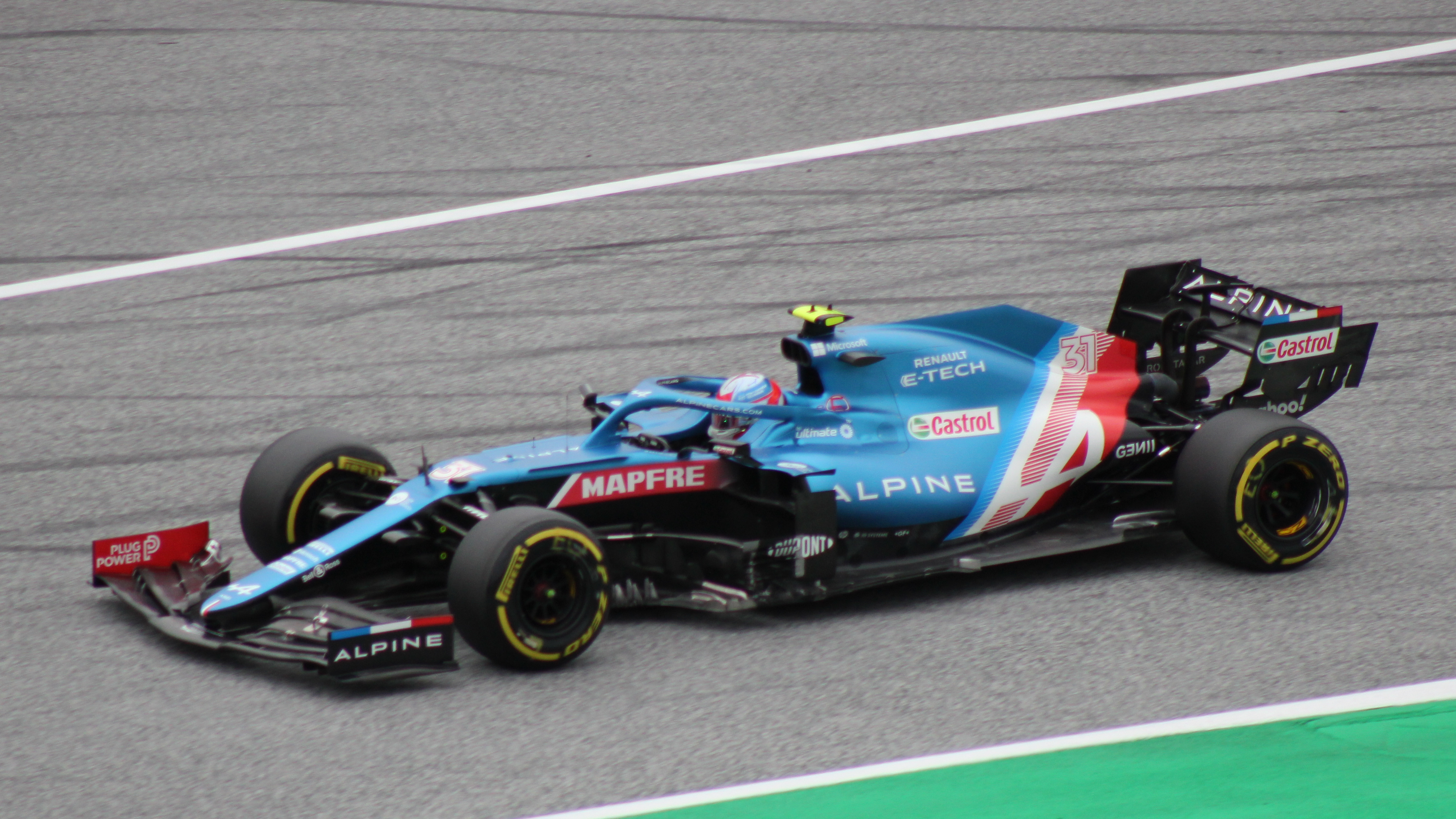
Ocon at the 2021 Austrian Grand Prix

Renault rebranded as Alpine F1 Team for the 2021 season. The team signed two-time world champion Fernando Alonso to partner Ocon after Daniel Ricciardo left for McLaren. At the season-opening Bahrain Grand Prix, Ocon was rear-ended by Sebastian Vettel and finished thirteenth; Vettel later apologised for the incident. Ocon was classified ninth at the Emilia Romagna Grand Prix ahead of Alonso in tenth, earning the team their first points under the Alpine name. His first retirement of the season came at the Azerbaijan Grand Prix with a turbocharger failure. He struggled with tyre wear and finished fourteenth at the French Grand Prix, qualified seventeenth for both the Styrian and Austrian Grands Prix and retired from the latter after a first-lap collision with Antonio Giovinazzi. Prior to the French Grand Prix, it was announced that Ocon had signed a contract extension with Alpine running to the end of 2024.

Ocon started eighth at the Hungarian Grand Prix. Multiple collisions ahead saw him promoted to second place at the first corner, which became first place when race leader Lewis Hamilton pitted for dry-weather tyres one lap later than the rest of the field. Ocon held on to the lead for the remainder of the race, fending off Sebastian Vettel to take his and Alpine's maiden Formula One victory and Team Enstone's first win since 2013.

This win was followed by points finishes at the next three races. The Turkish Grand Prix took place in damp conditions and Ocon finished tenth having run the entire race distance on one set of intermediate-weather tyres. This was the first time a driver had completed a full race distance without making a pit stop since 1997. A collision with Antonio Giovinazzi at the United States Grand Prix broke Ocon's front wing and ultimately led to retirement. A fifth-place finish at the Qatar Grand Prix was followed by a near-podium at the Saudi Arabian Grand Prix; Ocon briefly led the race at its first restart and ran in third place for most of the race, but was passed by Valtteri Bottas shortly before the chequered flag, finishing just 0.102 seconds behind.

Ocon ended the season eleventh in the drivers' championship, scoring 74 points to Alonso's 81. The two drivers were generally evenly-matched across the season with each qualifying and finishing ahead of the other an equal number of times. Edd Straw of The Race described the teammate battle as "nip and tuck" and praised Ocon for a "reputation-enhancing campaign".

==== 2022 season ====
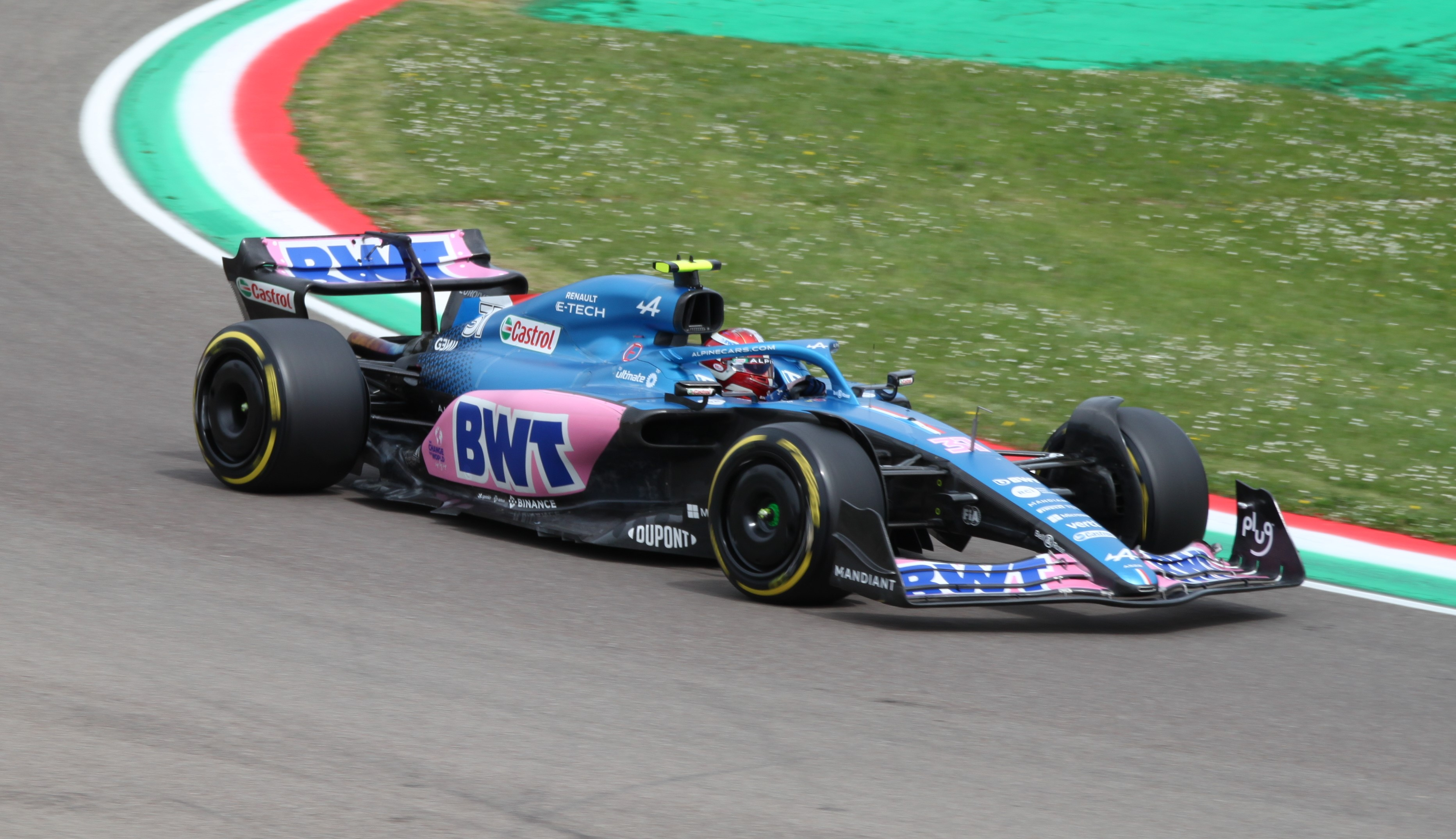
Ocon at the 2022 Emilia Romagna Grand Prix

Alpine retained Ocon and Alonso for the 2022 season. Ocon finished seventh at the season-opening Bahrain Grand Prix despite receiving a penalty for colliding with Mick Schumacher. He qualified fifth and finished sixth at the Saudi Arabian Grand Prix where a close battle with Alonso ended with Ocon being ordered by the team to hold his position. A crash in practice for the Miami Grand Prix forced him to miss qualifying and start last on the grid. He recovered in the race to be classified eighth. Ocon's practice crash into a concrete wall was measured at 42 g. He later revealed that the effects of the crash caused him to collapse in the shower and urinate blood the following morning.

At the Spanish Grand Prix, Ocon qualified twelfth and finished seventh, ahead of Alonso, after holding off the fast-charging Lando Norris. Ocon finished ninth at the Monaco Grand Prix but was demoted to twelfth by a penalty for colliding with Lewis Hamilton. At the British Grand Prix, Ocon qualified fifteenth due to battery issues and retired from the race with a fuel pump problem, despite the significant upgrade packages brought to the Alpine A522. Five points finishes followed, including fifth at the Austrian Grand Prix. Ocon qualified fifth at the Belgian Grand Prix but was demoted to sixteenth by an engine component penalty. He recovered in the race to score points in seventh place.

He started seventeenth at the Singapore Grand Prix having experienced brake problems in qualifying and then retired from the race with an engine failure. Ocon's best result of the season thus far came at the Japanese Grand Prix, where he held off Lewis Hamilton to finish fourth. Ocon was eliminated in the first qualifying session and started eighteenth at the United States Grand Prix; he finished eleventh after taking new power unit elements and starting from the pit lane. He was involved in separate collisions with teammate Alonso in the São Paulo Grand Prix sprint, with the damage to his car dropping him to seventeenth place. He recovered to score points in the race.

Ocon ended the season eighth in the drivers' championship, equalling his best result previously achieved in 2017. He scored 92 points to Alonso's 81 but was outqualified by Alonso in twelve out of twenty-two races. Matt Morlidge at Sky Sports described the season as Ocon's "best-ever" but put his points advantage over Alonso down to better car reliability.

==== 2023 season ====
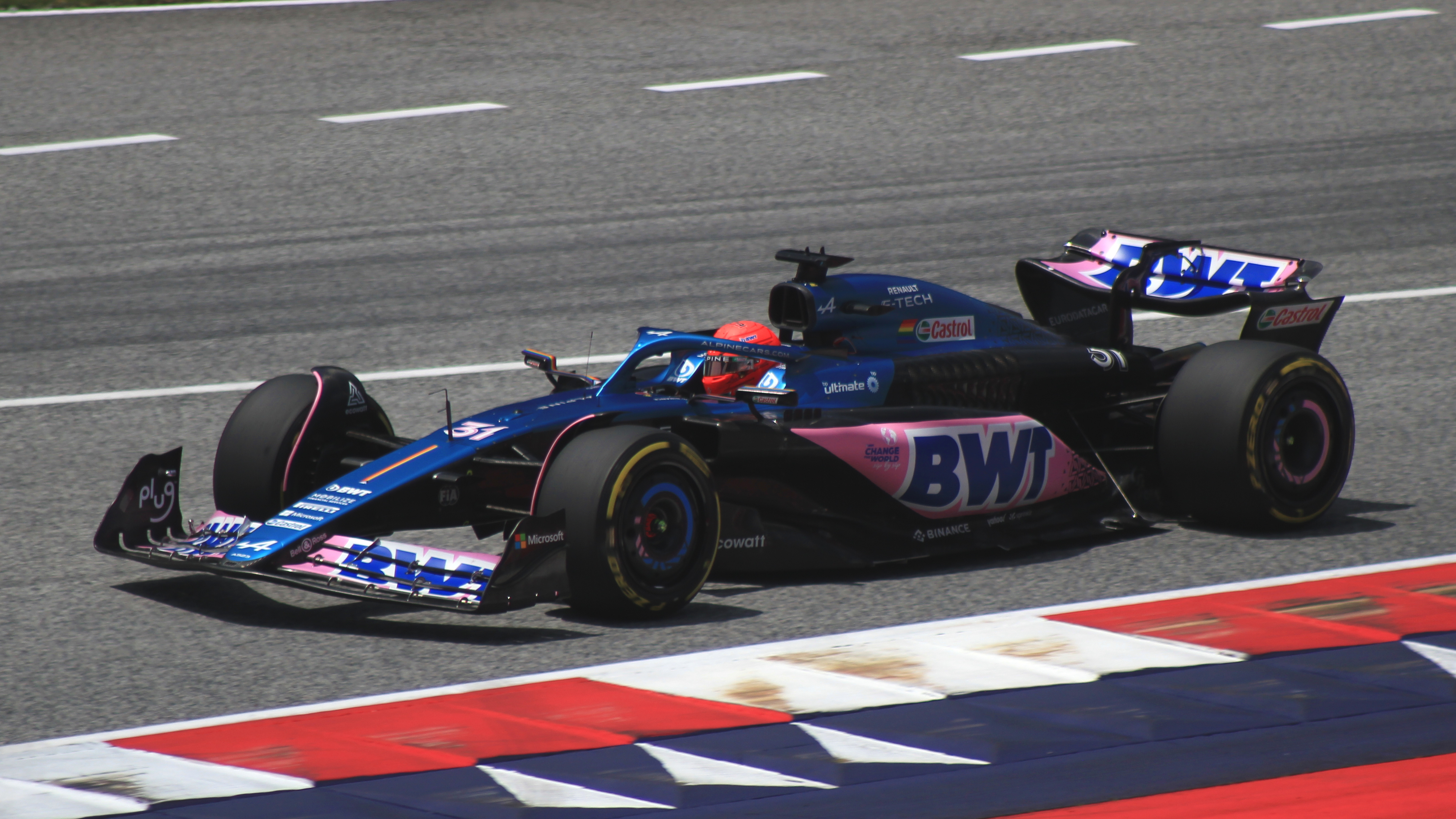
Ocon at the 2023 Austrian Grand Prix

For 2023, Ocon gained a new teammate in former karting rival Pierre Gasly as Alonso departed to Aston Martin. His training was impacted prior to the start of the season when he got "very sick" with a lung virus.

At the season-opening Bahrain Grand Prix, Ocon received penalties for being out of position on the grid, failing to serve the penalty correctly and for speeding in the pit lane. He eventually retired from the race with mechanical issues. He started sixth and scored his first points of the season at the Saudi Arabian Grand Prix, finishing eighth. Running in tenth place at the final restart of the Australian Grand Prix, Ocon was involved in a heavy collision with teammate Gasly, who apologised for his role in the incident. Ocon crashed in qualifying at the Azerbaijan Grand Prix and started the race from the pit lane. During the race, Ocon ran on hard tyres until the last lap. Photographers began to enter the pit lane, not realising Ocon was yet to pit, and narrowly avoided being hit by his car.

Ocon started third at the Monaco Grand Prix after Charles Leclerc ahead received a penalty. Ocon held off Carlos Sainz Jr. in the first half of the race but lost a place to George Russell during the pit stops. A mistake and a penalty for Russell allowed Ocon back into third place, earning him his third career podium and the Driver Of The Day award. More points came at the Spanish and Canadian Grands Prix and in the rain-affected Austrian Grand Prix sprint race where he held off Ferrari's Charles Leclerc and McLaren's Lando Norris. In the main race, Ocon received a record five time penalties for track limits violations and an unsafe pit box release. Consecutive retirements followed with a hydraulics leak at the British Grand Prix and a first-lap crash at the Hungarian Grand Prix. He improved from fourteenth on the grid at the Belgian Grand Prix to score points in eighth place.

Ocon retired from the Italian Grand Prix "for safety reasons" due to a steering issue. He then retired from sixth place at the Singapore Grand Prix with a gearbox problem, his fourth non-finish in six races. He finished the Qatar Grand Prix in seventh despite the hot weather conditions causing him to vomit into his helmet. His seventh retirement of the season came at the United States Grand Prix after a collision with Oscar Piastri. Ocon started sixteenth at the inaugural Las Vegas Grand Prix, avoided collisions to improve to eighth on the first lap and climbed to fourth place by the end of the race.

Ocon ended the season twelfth in the World Drivers' Championship with 58 points compared to 62 for teammate Gasly, who qualified ahead of Ocon at fourteen of the twenty-two races. Ocon described the season as a "wasted opportunity" due to his high number of race retirements. Mark Hughes at The Race commented that Ocon "did a pretty solid job" in 2023, but that as the season went on, "the momentum was with Gasly".

==== 2024: Early departure ====
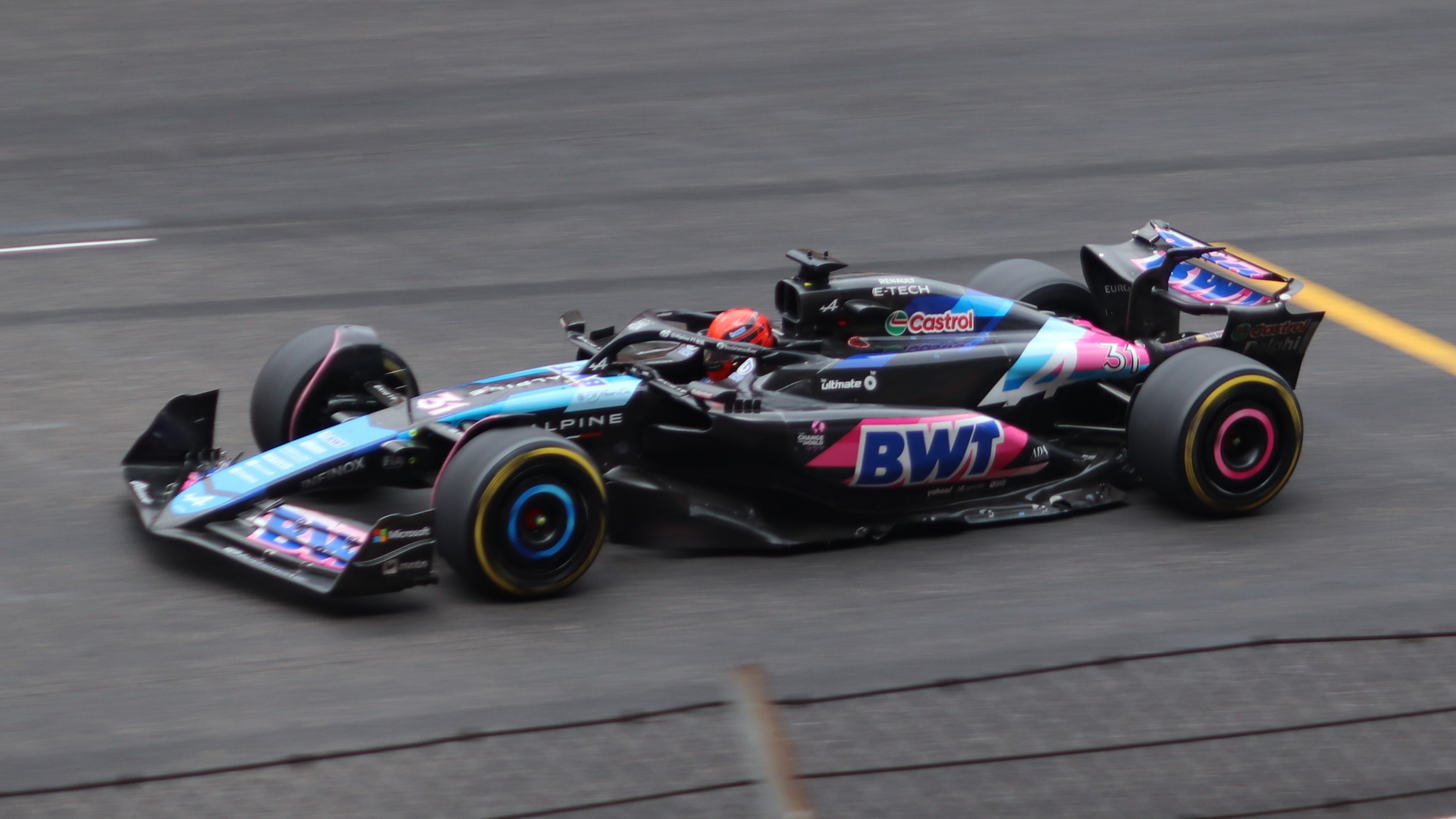
Ocon at the 2024 Chinese Grand Prix

Ocon continued alongside Gasly at Alpine for 2024. During pre-season testing, he noted that the team were "on the back foot". The Alpine drivers qualified nineteenth and twentieth for the season-opening Bahrain Grand Prix, which Gasly described as "not a surprise". Ocon reached the second qualifying session at the Australian Grand Prix but failed to make progress in the race. A helmet visor tear-off strip had got stuck in his car's brake duct, which Ocon believed had cost him a potential top-ten finish. Ocon claimed the team's first points of 2024 at the Miami Grand Prix, improving from thirteenth on the grid to tenth at the finish. He qualified eleventh at the Monaco Grand Prix but retired after colliding with Gasly on track, for which he apologised and claimed responsibility.

During the Canadian Grand Prix, Alpine imposed team orders forcing Ocon to give up ninth place to Gasly, who was in better position to attack Daniel Ricciardo. However, after Gasly failed to pass Ricciardo, Alpine did not ask Gasly to give the place back to Ocon, a decision he described as "nonsense". Ocon reached the third qualifying session (Q3) for the first time in 2024 at the Spanish Grand Prix and achieved another tenth-place finish. Further Q3 appearances came at the Austrian and Belgian Grands Prix, with Ocon scoring points in ninth place at the latter. He failed to score points at the following six races, but did set his first fastest lap at the United States Grand Prix after Alpine brought him in for a late pit stop to deny Constructors' Championship rivals Williams the bonus point for fastest lap.

A qualifying session beset by rain and red flags at the São Paulo Grand Prix helped Ocon qualify in fourth place. He led part of the race after the drivers ahead pitted, but was ultimately overtaken by eventual race winner Max Verstappen. Ocon finished the race in second place ahead of Gasly in third, marking Alpine's first double-podium and the first for Team Enstone since 2013. This result more than tripled the team's points tally and promoted them from ninth to sixth in the World Constructors' Championship. Ocon was eliminated in a lap-one collision at the Qatar Grand Prix, his final race for Alpine.

In June, shortly after his Monaco Grand Prix collision with Gasly, Alpine announced that Ocon would leave the team at the end of the season. In July, it was announced that he would join Haas for the 2025 season on a multi-year contract. Ocon did not take part in the season-ending Abu Dhabi Grand Prix; his seat was taken by Alpine reserve driver Jack Doohan, who was already set to replace Ocon in 2025. It was reported that, since Ocon was under contract until the end of the year, Alpine required him to leave the team one race early in exchange for being allowed to drive for Haas at the post-season test. Addressing speculation about the early driver change, Alpine team principal Oliver Oakes commented "I think it suits everybody". In a message on Instagram, Ocon thanked the team and wrote that "this is not how I wanted things to end."

Ocon placed fourteenth in the World Drivers' Championship, scoring 23 points to Gasly's 36 up to and including the Qatar Grand Prix. The two drivers were fairly evenly-matched in head-to-head results, with Ocon qualifying ahead of Gasly at twelve of the twenty-three races. Writers at Sky Sports praised Ocon's São Paulo performance but described his final season at Alpine as "otherwise a forgettable campaign".

=== Haas (2025–2026) ===
==== 2025 season ====
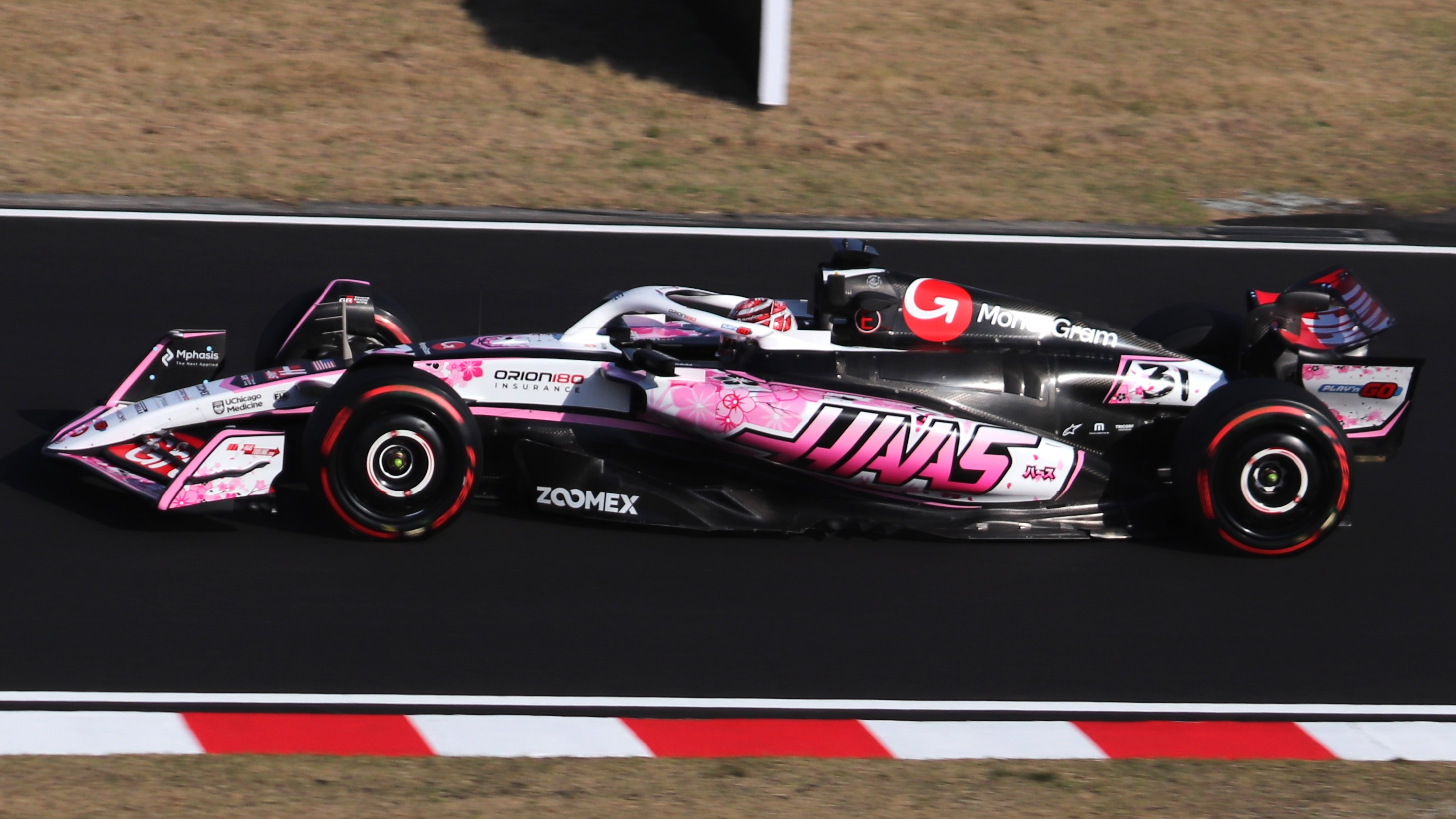
Ocon (pictured at the Japanese Grand Prix) signed for Haas in 2025.

Ocon joined Haas on a multi-year deal for 2025, partnering rookie Oliver Bearman. Ocon and Bearman qualified in the bottom two positions and finished last of the remaining drivers at the season-opening Australian Grand Prix, a result Ocon described as "unexpected". He finished fifth from eighteenth on the grid at the Chinese Grand Prix following disqualifications for both Ferrari drivers, achieving his first points finish in the VF-25. After crashing out of qualifying and starting fourteenth at the Bahrain Grand Prix, Ocon climbed to eighth on an alternate strategy. He retired with an engine failure at the Emilia-Romagna Grand Prix but then scored further points at the Monaco, Canadian and Austrian Grands Prix.

Ocon qualified and finished fifth at the Belgian Grand Prix sprint, scoring a further four points, but failed to score in the main race, describing the team's tyre strategy as "frustrating". He achieved more points finishes at the Dutch, Mexico City and Las Vegas Grands Prix, but was disqualified from qualifying at the Azerbaijan Grand Prix for a technical infringement and was eliminated from the United States Grand Prix sprint after a crash with Lance Stroll. He ended the season by qualifying in the top ten for the Abu Dhabi Grand Prix and finishing seventh, although he described his car as unstable and having been "unmanageable for many races".

Ocon finished fifteenth in the World Drivers' Championship with 38 points compared to 41 for teammate Bearman. Ocon was outqualified by Bearman at fourteen of the twenty-four races. Writers at The Race commented that Bearman's qualifying performance had "made life difficult" for Ocon, and Haas team principal Ayao Komatsu remarked that the team had "expected more" from him.

==== 2026: Second early departure ====
Ocon driving at the 2026 Chinese Grand Prix

Ocon continued driving alongside Bearman at Haas in 2026. At pre-season testing, Ocon stated that the VF-26 had "good grip and balance", but had a challenge adapting to the new regulations, particularly in both energy management and engine deployment.

Ocon qualified and finished outside the top ten at the first two races (the Australian and Chinese Grands Prix) whilst Bearman scored a total of 17 points. Ocon was given a ten-second time penalty at the latter for colliding with Franco Colapinto. Ocon scored a point at the Japanese Grand Prix, finishing tenth, having been disadvantaged by the timing of a safety car. Further points came at the Monaco Grand Prix, where he improved from seventeenth on the grid to ninth at the finish. After another elimination in the first qualifying session (Q1) at the Belgian Grand Prix, Ocon claimed that "only [Bearman's] car works as it should", complaining of a lack of straight-line speed. Ocon and Bearman collided on the first lap of the race, causing tyre punctures for both cars.

Ocon retired from the Dutch Grand Prix with an engine failure. He started the Azerbaijan Grand Prix in thirteenth place and improved to eighth at the finish, his best result of the season thus far. After the Azerbaijan Grand Prix in September, Ocon confirmed that he would leave Haas at the end of the season. Writing on social media, Ocon said he was proud of his performances "in what were not always the easiest of circumstances" and that his departure was "absolutely not the end" of his Formula One career. At the Mexico City Grand Prix, Ocon was replaced by reserve driver Ryo Hirakawa for the first practice session (FP1) as part of the requirement for all teams to run rookie drivers in a select number of these sessions. Ocon returned to his seat for FP2, during which there was a dispute between Ocon and his race engineer regarding tyre choice. Prior to FP3 on the day before the race, Haas announced that Hirakawa would replace Ocon for the remainder of the weekend. No reason was given for the change.

Two days after the Mexico City Grand Prix, Haas announced that Ocon would be released from the team with immediate effect and would be replaced by Formula 2 championship leader Rafael Câmara, who was already set to replace Ocon for the 2027 season. In a statement, team principal Komatsu said that the decision was "in the best interest of the team" and that the conversations between the team and Ocon that led to his dismissal were an "internal matter".

== Karting record ==
=== Karting career summary ===
Season	Series	Team	Position
2005	Championnat de France Regional Ile de France — Minime		1st
2005	Coupe de France — Mini Kart		5th
2006	Championnat de France — Minime		8th
2007	Championnat de France — Minime		1st
2008	Bridgestone Cup — Cadet		NC
2008	Championnat de France — Cadet		1st
2009	Spanish Championship — KF3		35th
2009	Bridgestone Cup Europe — KF3		4th
2009	WSK International Series — KF3		35th
2010	South Garda Winter Cup — KF3		7th
2010	Andrea Margutti Trophy — KF3		2nd
2010	Italian Open Masters — KF3		35th
2010	WSK Euro Series — KF3		14th
2010	CIK-FIA European Championship — KF3		NC
2010	CIK-FIA World Cup — KF3		7th
2010	French Cup — KF3		1st
2010	Monaco Kart Cup — KF3		39th
2010	Bridgestone Cup European Final — KF3		6th
2010	WSK Nations Cup — KF3		6th
2011	Trofeo Grifone — KF3		1st
2011	Andrea Margutti Trophy — KF3	Gsm Kaarting	6th
2011	Championnat de France — KF3		1st
2011	CIK-FIA European Championship — KF3		NC
2011	WSK Euro Series — KF3	GSM One Karting	2nd
2011	CIK-FIA Karting Academy Trophy		27th
2011	CIK-FIA World Cup — KF3		14th
2011	Grand Prix Open Karting — KF3		1st
2011	ERDF Masters Kart — Junior		9th
2012	Indonesia Kart Prix — KF2		14th

== Racing record ==
=== Racing career summary ===
Season	Series	Team	Races	Wins	Poles	F/Laps	Podiums	Points	Position
2012	Eurocup Formula Renault 2.0	Koiranen Motorsport	14	0	0	0	1	31	14th
2012	Formula Renault 2.0 Alps	Koiranen Motorsport	9	0	0	1	2	69	7th
2013	Eurocup Formula Renault 2.0	ART Junior Team	14	2	1	1	5	159	**3rd**
2013	Formula Renault 2.0 NEC	ART Junior Team	8	1	0	1	3	122	12th
2013	Macau Grand Prix	Prema Powerteam	2	0	0	0	0	N/A	10th
2014	FIA Formula 3 European Championship	Prema Powerteam	33	9	15	7	21	478	**1st**
2014	Formula Renault 3.5 Series	Comtec Racing	3	0	0	0	0	2	23rd
2014	Macau Grand Prix	Theodore Racing by Prema	2	0	0	0	0	N/A	DNF
2014	Formula One	Lotus F1 Team	Test driver						
2015	GP3 Series	ART Grand Prix	18	1	3	5	14	253	**1st**
2016	Deutsche Tourenwagen Masters	Mercedes-Benz DTM Team ART	10	0	0	0	0	2	26th
2016	Formula One	Manor Racing MRT	9	0	0	0	0	0	23rd
2016	Formula One	Renault F1 Team	Test driver						
2017	Formula One	Sahara Force India F1 Team	20	0	0	0	0	87	8th
2018	Formula One	Sahara Force India F1 Team	12	0	0	0	0	49	12th
2018	Formula One	Racing Point Force India F1 Team	9	0	0	0	0	49	12th
2019	Formula One	Mercedes-AMG Petronas Motorsport	Reserve driver						
2020	Formula One	Renault DP World F1 Team	17	0	0	0	1	62	12th
2021	Formula One	Alpine F1 Team	22	1	0	0	1	74	11th
2022	Formula One	BWT Alpine F1 Team	22	0	0	0	0	92	8th
2023	Formula One	BWT Alpine F1 Team	22	0	0	0	1	58	12th
2024	Formula One	BWT Alpine F1 Team	23	0	0	1	1	23	14th
2025	Formula One	MoneyGram Haas F1 Team	24	0	0	0	0	38	15th
2026	Formula One	TGR Haas F1 Team	19	0	0	0	0	7*	16th*

* Season still in progress.

=== Complete Macau Grand Prix results ===
Year	Team	Car	Qualifying	Quali Race	Main race
2013	(Italy) Prema Powerteam	Dallara F312	15th	10th	10th
2014	(Hong Kong) Theodore Racing by Prema	Dallara F312	**2nd**	4th	DNF

=== Complete Eurocup Formula Renault 2.0 results ===
(key) (Races in bold indicate pole position) (Races in italics indicate fastest lap)

Year	Entrant	1	2	3	4	5	6	7	8	9	10	11	12	13	14	Pos	Points
2012	Koiranen Motorsport	ALC; 1; 19	ALC; 2; 5	SPA; 1; 21	SPA; 2; 24	NÜR; 1; 12	NÜR; 2; 18	MSC; 1; 8	MSC; 2 Ret	HUN; 1; 21	HUN; 2; 18	LEC; 1; 9	LEC; 2; 3	CAT; 1 Ret	CAT; 2 Ret	14th	31
2013	ART Junior Team	ALC; 1; 2	ALC; 2; 6	SPA; 1; 8	SPA; 2; 7	MSC; 1; 4	**MSC**; **2**; 2	RBR; 1; 11	RBR; 2; 14	HUN; 1; 2	HUN; 2; 4	LEC; 1; 9	LEC; 2; 1	CAT; 1; 7	CAT; 2; 1	3rd	159

=== Complete Formula Renault 2.0 Alps Series results ===
(key) (Races in bold indicate pole position; races in italics indicate fastest lap)

Year	Team	1	2	3	4	5	6	7	8	9	10	11	12	13	14	Pos	Points
2012	Koiranen Motorsport	MNZ; 1; 8	MNZ; 2; 5	PAU; 1	PAU; 2	IMO; 1; 7	IMO; 2; 4	SPA; 1; 25	SPA; 2; 7	RBR; 1; 3	RBR; 2; 3	MUG; 1	MUG; 2	CAT; 1; 11	CAT; 2 DNS	7th	69

=== Complete Formula Renault 2.0 NEC results ===
(key) (Races in bold indicate pole position) (Races in italics indicate fastest lap)

Year	Entrant	1	2	3	4	5	6	7	8	9	10	11	12	13	14	15	16	17	DC	Points
2013	ART Junior Team	HOC; 1; 1	HOC; 2; 4	HOC; 3; 8	NÜR; 1; 2	NÜR; 2; 7	SIL; 1	SIL; 2	SPA; 1	SPA; 2	ASS; 1	ASS; 2	MST; 1 Ret	MST; 2; 2	MST; 3 Ret	ZAN; 1	ZAN; 2	ZAN; 3	12th	122

=== Complete FIA Formula 3 European Championship ===
(key) (Races in bold indicate pole position) (Races in italics indicate fastest lap)

Year	Entrant	1	2	3	4	5	6	7	8	9	10	11	12	13	14	15	16	17	18	19	20	21	22	23	24	25	26	27	28	29	30	31	32	33	DC	Points
2014	Prema Powerteam	SIL; 1; 2	**SIL**; **2**; 1	**SIL**; **3**; 3	HOC; 1; 9	HOC; 2; 1	HOC; 3; 2	**PAU**; **1**; 1	**PAU**; **2**; 2	**PAU**; **3**; 2	**HUN**; **1**; 2	**HUN**; **2**; 1	**HUN**; **3**; 1	**SPA**; **1** Ret	SPA; 2; 2	**SPA**; **3**; 2	NOR; 1; 2	NOR; 2; 14	NOR; 3; 2	**MSC**; **1**; 1	**MSC**; **2**; 1	**MSC**; **3**; 1	**RBR**; **1**; 13	RBR; 2 Ret	RBR; 3; 13	NÜR; 1; 6	NÜR; 2; 3	NÜR; 3 Ret	**IMO**; **1**; 1	IMO; 2; 4	IMO; 3; 3	HOC; 1; 7	HOC; 2; 4	HOC; 3; 7	1st	478

=== Complete Formula Renault 3.5 Series results ===
(key) (Races in bold indicate pole position) (Races in italics indicate fastest lap)

Year	Team	1	2	3	4	5	6	7	8	9	10	11	12	13	14	15	16	17	Pos	Points
2014	Comtec Racing	MNZ; 1	MNZ; 2	ALC; 1	ALC; 2	MON; 1	SPA; 1	SPA; 2	MSC; 1	MSC; 2	NÜR; 1	NÜR; 2	HUN; 1; 9	HUN; 2 DNS	LEC; 1; 14	LEC; 2; 12	JER; 1	JER; 2	23rd	2

=== Complete GP3 Series results ===
(key) (Races in bold indicate pole position) (Races in italics indicate fastest lap)

Year	Entrant	1	2	3	4	5	6	7	8	9	10	11	12	13	14	15	16	17	18	Pos	Points
2015	ART Grand Prix	CAT; FEA; 1	CAT; SPR; 7	RBR; FEA; 3	RBR; SPR; DSQ	SIL; FEA; 6	SIL; SPR; 2	HUN; FEA; 2	HUN; SPR; 2	SPA; FEA; 2	SPA; SPR; 2	MNZ; FEA; 2	MNZ; SPR; 2	**SOC**; **FEA**; 2	SOC; SPR; 2	**BHR**; **FEA**; 3	BHR; SPR; 2	**YMC**; **FEA**; 4	YMC; SPR; 3	1st	253

=== Complete Deutsche Tourenwagen Masters results ===
(key) (Races in bold indicate pole position) (Races in italics indicate fastest lap)

Year	Team	Car	1	2	3	4	5	6	7	8	9	10	11	12	13	14	15	16	17	18	Pos	Points
2016	Mercedes-Benz DTM Team ART	Mercedes-AMG C63 DTM	HOC; 1 Ret	HOC; 2 Ret	SPL; 1; 20	SPL; 2; 18	LAU; 1; 23	LAU; 2; 15	NOR; 1 Ret	NOR; 2; 13	ZAN; 1; 9	ZAN; 2; 18	MSC; 1	MSC; 2	NÜR; 1	NÜR; 2	HUN; 1	HUN; 2	HOC; 1	HOC; 2	26th	2

=== Complete Formula One results ===
(key) (Races in bold indicate pole position) (Races in italics indicates fastest lap)

Year	Entrant	Chassis	Engine	1	2	3	4	5	6	7	8	9	10	11	12	13	14	15	16	17	18	19	20	21	22	23	24	WDC	Points
2014	Lotus F1 Team	Lotus E22	Renault Energy F1‑2014 1.6 V6 t	AUS	MAL	BHR	CHN	ESP	MON	CAN	AUT	GBR	GER	HUN	BEL	ITA	SIN	JPN	RUS	USA	BRA	ABU; TD						–	–
2016	Renault Sport F1 Team	Renault R.S.16	Renault R.E.16 1.6 V6 t	AUS	BHR	CHN	RUS	ESP; TD	MON	CAN	EUR	AUT	GBR; TD	HUN; TD	GER; TD													23rd	0
2016	Manor Racing MRT	Manor MRT05	Mercedes PU106C Hybrid 1.6 V6 t													BEL; 16	ITA; 18	SIN; 18	MAL; 16	JPN; 21	USA; 18	MEX; 21	BRA; 12	ABU; 13				23rd	0
2017	Sahara Force India F1 Team	Force India VJM10	Mercedes M08 EQ Power+ 1.6 V6 t	AUS; 10	CHN; 10	BHR; 10	RUS; 7	ESP; 5	MON; 12	CAN; 6	AZE; 6	AUT; 8	GBR; 8	HUN; 9	BEL; 9	ITA; 6	SIN; 10	MAL; 10	JPN; 6	USA; 6	MEX; 5	BRA; Ret	ABU; 8					8th	87
2018	Sahara Force India F1 Team	Force India VJM11	Mercedes M09 EQ Power+ 1.6 V6 t	AUS; 12	BHR; 10	CHN; 11	AZE; Ret	ESP; Ret	MON; 6	CAN; 9	FRA; Ret	AUT; 6	GBR; 7	GER; 8	HUN; 13													12th	49
2018	Racing Point Force India F1 Team	Force India VJM11	Mercedes M09 EQ Power+ 1.6 V6 t													BEL; 6	ITA; 6	SIN; Ret	RUS; 9	JPN; 9	USA; DSQ	MEX; 11	BRA; 14	ABU; Ret				12th	49
2020	Renault DP World F1 Team	Renault R.S.20	Renault E-Tech 20 1.6 V6 t	AUT; 8	STY; Ret	HUN; 14	GBR; 6	70A; 8	ESP; 13	BEL; 5	ITA; 8	TUS; Ret	RUS; 7	EIF; Ret	POR; 8	EMI; Ret	TUR; 11	BHR; 9	SKH; 2	ABU; 9								12th	62
2021	Alpine F1 Team	Alpine A521	Renault E-Tech 20B 1.6 V6 t	BHR; 13	EMI; 9	POR; 7	ESP; 9	MON; 9	AZE; Ret	FRA; 14	STY; 14	AUT; Ret	GBR; 9	HUN; 1	BEL; 7‡	NED; 9	ITA; 10	RUS; 14	TUR; 10	USA; Ret	MXC; 13	SAP; 8	QAT; 5	SAU; 4	ABU; 9			11th	74
2022	BWT Alpine F1 Team	Alpine A522	Renault E-Tech 22 1.6 V6 t	BHR; 7	SAU; 6	AUS; 7	EMI; 14	MIA; 8	ESP; 7	MON; 12	AZE; 10	CAN; 6	GBR; Ret	AUT; 5^{6}	FRA; 8	HUN; 9	BEL; 7	NED; 9	ITA; 11	SIN; Ret	JPN; 4	USA; 11	MXC; 8	SAP; 8	ABU; 7			8th	92
2023	BWT Alpine F1 Team	Alpine A523	Renault E-Tech 23 1.6 V6 t	BHR; Ret	SAU; 8	AUS; 14†	AZE; 15	MIA; 9	MON; 3	ESP; 8	CAN; 8	AUT; 14^{7}	GBR; Ret	HUN; Ret	BEL; 8	NED; 10	ITA; Ret	SIN; Ret	JPN; 9	QAT; 7	USA; Ret	MXC; 10	SAP; 10	LVG; 4	ABU; 12			12th	58
2024	BWT Alpine F1 Team	Alpine A524	Renault E-Tech 23 1.6 V6 t	BHR; 17	SAU; 13	AUS; 16	JPN; 15	CHN; 11	MIA; 10	EMI; 14	MON; Ret	CAN; 10	ESP; 10	AUT; 12	GBR; 16	HUN; 18	BEL; 9	NED; 15	ITA; 14	AZE; 15	SIN; 13	USA; 18	MXC; 13	SAP; 2	LVG; 17	QAT; Ret	ABU	14th	23
2025	MoneyGram Haas F1 Team	Haas VF-25	Ferrari 066/10 1.6 V6 t	AUS; 13	CHN; 5	JPN; 18	BHR; 8	SAU; 14	MIA; 12	EMI; Ret	MON; 7	ESP; 16	CAN; 9	AUT; 10	GBR; 13	BEL; 15^{5}	HUN; 16	NED; 10	ITA; 15	AZE; 14	SIN; 18	USA; 15	MXC; 9	SAP; 12	LVG; 9	QAT; 15	ABU; 7	15th	38
2026	TGR Haas F1 Team	Haas VF-26	Ferrari 067/6 1.6 V6 t	AUS; 11	CHN; 14	JPN; 10	MIA; 13	CAN; 14	MON; 9	BCN; 13	AUT; 16	GBR; 13	BEL; 17	HUN; 16	NED; Ret	ITA; 16	ESP; 11	AZE; 8	BHR; 15	SIN; 13	USA; 14	MXC; WD	SAP	LVG	QAT	ABU		16th*	7*

^{†} Did not finish, but was classified as he had completed more than 90% of the race distance.
^{‡} Half points awarded as less than 75% of race distance was completed.
* Season still in progress.

=== Formula One records ===
Ocon holds the following Formula One records:

Record		Achieved	Ref.
**Most consecutive finishes from start of career**	27	2016 Belgian Grand Prix – 2017 Mexican Grand Prix	
**Most (driving) penalties in one race**	5	2023 Austrian Grand Prix	
**Most races without a pole position**	199	2026 Mexico City Grand Prix	

Sporting positions
Preceded by Raffaele Marciello	European Formula 3 Champion; 2014	Succeeded by Felix Rosenqvist
Preceded by Alex Lynn	GP3 Series; Champion; 2015	Succeeded by Charles Leclerc
