= 2024 Spanish Grand Prix =

Formula One motor race

Race 10 of 24 in the 2024 Formula One World Championship
← Previous race	Next race →
- Layout of the Circuit de Barcelona-Catalunya, Spain

Race details
- Date: 23 June 2024
- Official name: Formula 1 Aramco Gran Premio de España 2024
- Location: Circuit de Barcelona-Catalunya, Montmeló, Spain
- Course: Permanent racing facility
- Course length: 4.657 km (2.894 miles)
- Distance: 66 laps, 307.236 km (190.908 miles)
- Weather: Clear
- Attendance: 297,368

Pole position
Driver	(United Kingdom) Lando Norris	McLaren-Mercedes
- Time: 1:11.383

Fastest lap
Driver	(United Kingdom) Lando Norris	McLaren-Mercedes
- Time: 1:17.115 on lap 51

Podium
First	(Netherlands) Max Verstappen	Red Bull Racing-Honda RBPT
Second	(United Kingdom) Lando Norris	McLaren-Mercedes
Third	(United Kingdom) Lewis Hamilton	Mercedes

The 2024 Spanish Grand Prix (officially known as the Formula 1 Aramco Gran Premio de España 2024) was a Formula One motor race held on 23 June 2024, at the Circuit de Barcelona-Catalunya in Montmeló, Spain. It was the tenth round of the 2024 Formula One World Championship.

Max Verstappen of Red Bull Racing took victory ahead of polesitter Lando Norris of McLaren, who was closing in on Verstappen during the final stages of the race. Lewis Hamilton of Mercedes took third, his first podium of the season. This would be Verstappen's last win until the São Paulo Grand Prix, 11 races later, marking his longest winless streak since 2020.

== Background ==
The event was held at the Circuit de Barcelona-Catalunya in Montmeló for the 34th time in the circuit's history, across the weekend of 21–23 June. The Grand Prix was the tenth round of the 2024 Formula One World Championship and the 54th running of the Spanish Grand Prix as a round of the Formula One World Championship.

=== Championship standings before the race ===
Going into the weekend, Max Verstappen led the Drivers' Championship with 194 points, 56 points ahead of Charles Leclerc in second, and 63 ahead of Lando Norris in third. Red Bull Racing, with 301 points, led the Constructors' Championship from Ferrari and McLaren, who are second and third with 252 and 212 points, respectively.

=== Entrants ===
The drivers and teams were the same as the season entry list with no additional stand-in drivers for the race. Oliver Bearman drove in the first free practice session for Haas, in place of Nico Hülkenberg.

=== Tyre choices ===
Tyre supplier Pirelli brought the C1, C2, and C3 tyre compounds (the three hardest in their range) designated hard, medium, and soft, respectively, for teams to use at the event.

=== Penalties ===
Sergio Pérez of Red Bull Racing carried a three-place grid penalty for failing to leave the track with serious mechanical difficulties after significantly damaging the rear wing at the preceding Canadian Grand Prix.

=== Track changes ===
The DRS zone leading in to turn 1 was shortened by 100 metres (330 ft).

== Practice ==
Three free practice sessions were held for the event. The first free practice session was held on 21 June 2024, at 13:30 local time (UTC+2), and was topped by Lando Norris of McLaren ahead of Max Verstappen of Red Bull Racing and Carlos Sainz Jr. of Ferrari. The second free practice session was held on the same day, at 17:00 local time, and was topped by Lewis Hamilton of Mercedes ahead of Sainz and Norris. The third free practice session was held on 22 June 2024, at 12:30 local time, and was topped by Sainz ahead of Norris and Sainz's teammate Charles Leclerc. During the session, Leclerc and Lance Stroll of Aston Martin impeded Norris and Hamilton in separate incidents. Leclerc and Stroll cut across Norris and Hamilton, respectively, with contact occurring in both cases. Leclerc and Stroll were both reprimanded for "erratic driving".

== Qualifying ==
Qualifying was held on 22 June 2024, at 16:00 local time (UTC+2).

=== Qualifying report ===
Logan Sargeant impeded Lance Stroll during the first segment of qualifying (Q1), with the former receiving a three-place grid penalty as a result. Oscar Piastri's lap of 1:12.542 during the third segment of qualifying (Q3) was deleted for exceeding track limits at turn 10. In Q3 McLaren's Lando Norris beat championship leader Max Verstappen of Red Bull Racing to pole position by 0.020 seconds.

=== Qualifying classification ===
Pos.	No.	Driver	Constructor	Qualifying times			Final grid
Pos.	No.	Driver	Constructor	Q1	Q2	Q3	Final grid
1	4	(United Kingdom) Lando Norris	McLaren-Mercedes	1:12.386	1:11.872	1:11.383	1
2	1	(Netherlands) Max Verstappen	Red Bull Racing-Honda RBPT	1:12.306	1:11.653	1:11.403	2
3	44	(United Kingdom) Lewis Hamilton	Mercedes	1:12.143	1:11.792	1:11.701	3
4	63	(United Kingdom) George Russell	Mercedes	1:12.456	1:11.812	1:11.703	4
5	16	(Monaco) Charles Leclerc	Ferrari	1:12.257	1:12.038	1:11.731	5
6	55	(Spain) Carlos Sainz Jr.	Ferrari	1:12.403	1:11.874	1:11.736	6
7	10	(France) Pierre Gasly	Alpine-Renault	1:12.651	1:12.079	1:11.857	7
8	11	(Mexico) Sergio Pérez	Red Bull Racing-Honda RBPT	1:12.477	1:12.054	1:12.061	11^{a}
9	31	(France) Esteban Ocon	Alpine-Renault	1:12.691	1:12.109	1:12.125	8
10	81	(Australia) Oscar Piastri	McLaren-Mercedes	1:12.460	1:12.011	No time	9
11	14	(Spain) Fernando Alonso	Aston Martin Aramco-Mercedes	1:12.505	1:12.128	N/A	10
12	77	(Finland) Valtteri Bottas	Kick Sauber-Ferrari	1:12.758	1:12.227	N/A	12
13	27	(Germany) Nico Hülkenberg	Haas-Ferrari	1:12.708	1:12.310	N/A	13
14	18	(Canada) Lance Stroll	Aston Martin Aramco-Mercedes	1:12.881	1:12.372	N/A	14
15	24	(China) Zhou Guanyu	Kick Sauber-Ferrari	1:12.880	1:12.738	N/A	15
16	20	(Denmark) Kevin Magnussen	Haas-Ferrari	1:12.937	N/A	N/A	16
17	22	(Japan) Yuki Tsunoda	RB-Honda RBPT	1:12.985	N/A	N/A	17
18	3	(Australia) Daniel Ricciardo	RB-Honda RBPT	1:13.075	N/A	N/A	18
19	23	(Thailand) Alexander Albon	Williams-Mercedes	1:13.153	N/A	N/A	PL^{b}
20	2	(United States) Logan Sargeant	Williams-Mercedes	1:13.509	N/A	N/A	19^{c}
107% time: 1:17.193

Notes

- ^a – Sergio Pérez received a three-place grid penalty for failing to leave the track with serious mechanical difficulties after significantly damaging the rear wing at the previous round.
- ^b – Alexander Albon qualified 19th, but was required to start the race from the pit lane due to power unit changes made during parc fermé.
- ^c – Logan Sargeant received a three-place grid penalty for impeding Lance Stroll in Q1. He gained a position as Alexander Albon started the race from the pit lane.

== Race ==
The race was held on 23 June 2024, at 15:00 local time (UTC+2), and was run for 66 laps.

=== Race report ===
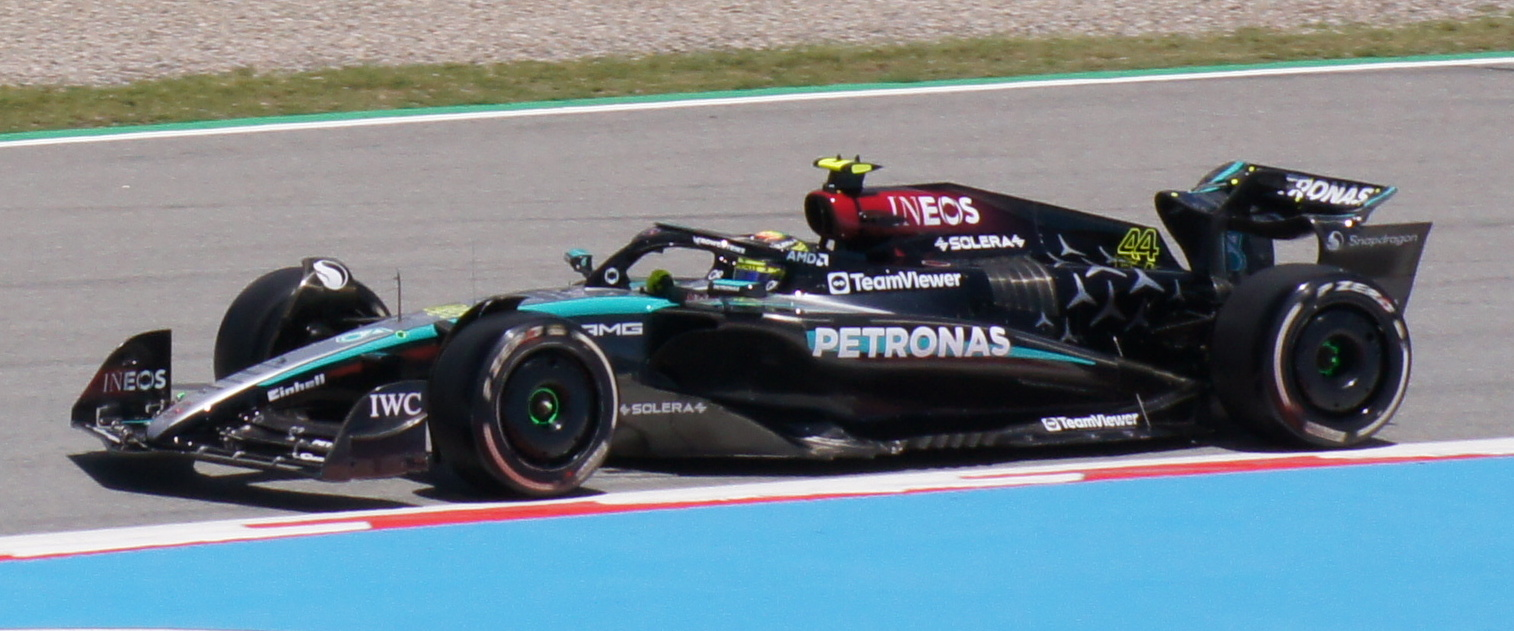
Hamilton took his first podium of the year with a third-place finish.

Pole-sitter Lando Norris almost pushed second-placed Max Verstappen off at the start, allowing fourth-placed George Russell, who had a great start, to gain the lead onto the first turn. At the back, Fernando Alonso almost ran into the back of Oscar Piastri, which caused Alonso to leave the track and in the run-off area. Verstappen overtook Russell for the lead with DRS on lap 3. On the same lap, the Ferraris collided with each other, scraping Charles Leclerc's wing endplate, with home hero Carlos Sainz Jr. up to fifth, despite overtaking Leclerc off-track. No further action was taken. Two laps later, Kevin Magnussen and Yuki Tsunoda battled for position, with Magnussen initially taking the position before Tsunoda took the place back, a few laps then later. Tsunoda, heading to turn 1, was forced off-track by Magnussen, no other further action was taken as well.

On lap 19, Lewis Hamilton and Sainz made minor contact, the third time that no further action was taken due to the battle. Norris, now in 3rd on lap 35, overtook Russell, and in the closing laps, the Ferraris swapped positions, with Leclerc in fifth and Sainz in sixth. The race was won by Verstappen, in which was his seventh victory of the season, second would be pole-sitter Norris, with Hamilton taking the final podium place, with his 198th podium. This would be Verstappen's and Red Bull's last win until the São Paulo Grand Prix, 11 races later, marking his longest winless streak since 2020.

As a consequence, Verstappen extended his lead in the World Drivers' Championship to 69 points over Norris, who overtook Charles Leclerc for second place in the standings, by two points. In the World Constructors' Championship, the top five remained unchanged, with Red Bull moving to 330 points, extending their lead over Ferrari to 60 points. McLaren was 33 points behind Ferrari in third.

=== Race classification ===
Pos.	No.	Driver	Constructor	Laps	Time/Retired	Grid	Points
1	1	(Netherlands) Max Verstappen	Red Bull Racing-Honda RBPT	66	1:28:20.227	2	25
2	4	(United Kingdom) Lando Norris	McLaren-Mercedes	66	+2.219	1	19^{a}
3	44	(United Kingdom) Lewis Hamilton	Mercedes	66	+17.790	3	15
4	63	(United Kingdom) George Russell	Mercedes	66	+22.320	4	12
5	16	(Monaco) Charles Leclerc	Ferrari	66	+22.709	5	10
6	55	(Spain) Carlos Sainz Jr.	Ferrari	66	+31.028	6	8
7	81	(Australia) Oscar Piastri	McLaren-Mercedes	66	+33.760	9	6
8	11	(Mexico) Sergio Pérez	Red Bull Racing-Honda RBPT	66	+59.524	11	4
9	10	(France) Pierre Gasly	Alpine-Renault	66	+1:02.025	7	2
10	31	(France) Esteban Ocon	Alpine-Renault	66	+1:11.889	8	1
11	27	(Germany) Nico Hülkenberg	Haas-Ferrari	66	+1:19.215^{b}	13	
12	14	(Spain) Fernando Alonso	Aston Martin Aramco-Mercedes	65	+1 lap	10	
13	24	(China) Zhou Guanyu	Kick Sauber-Ferrari	65	+1 lap	15	
14	18	(Canada) Lance Stroll	Aston Martin Aramco-Mercedes	65	+1 lap	14	
15	3	(Australia) Daniel Ricciardo	RB-Honda RBPT	65	+1 lap	18	
16	77	(Finland) Valtteri Bottas	Kick Sauber-Ferrari	65	+1 lap	12	
17	20	(Denmark) Kevin Magnussen	Haas-Ferrari	65	+1 lap	16	
18	23	(Thailand) Alexander Albon	Williams-Mercedes	65	+1 lap	PL	
19	22	(Japan) Yuki Tsunoda	RB-Honda RBPT	65	+1 lap^{b}	17	
20	2	(United States) Logan Sargeant	Williams-Mercedes	64	+2 laps	19	
Fastest lap: (United Kingdom) Lando Norris (McLaren-Mercedes) – 1:17.115 (lap 51)

Notes

- ^a – Includes one point for fastest lap.
- ^b – Nico Hülkenberg and Yuki Tsunoda both received a five-second time penalty for speeding in the pit lane. Their final positions were not affected by the penalties.

== Championship standings after the race ==
Drivers' Championship standings

	Pos.	Driver	Points
	1	(Netherlands) Max Verstappen	219
1	2	(United Kingdom) Lando Norris	150
1	3	(Monaco) Charles Leclerc	148
	4	(Spain) Carlos Sainz Jr.	116
	5	(Mexico) Sergio Pérez	111

Constructors' Championship standings

Pos.	Constructor	Points
1	(Austria) Red Bull Racing-Honda RBPT	330
2	(Italy) Ferrari	270
3	(United Kingdom) McLaren-Mercedes	237
4	(Germany) Mercedes	151
5	(United Kingdom) Aston Martin Aramco-Mercedes	58

- Note: Only the top five positions are included for both sets of standings.

== See also ==
- 2024 Barcelona Formula 2 round
- 2024 Barcelona Formula 3 round

Previous race: 2024 Canadian Grand Prix	FIA Formula One World Championship; 2024 season	Next race: 2024 Austrian Grand Prix
Previous race: 2023 Spanish Grand Prix	Spanish Grand Prix	Next race: 2025 Spanish Grand Prix
