= Lucy O'Reilly Schell =

American racing driver, team owner, and businesswoman

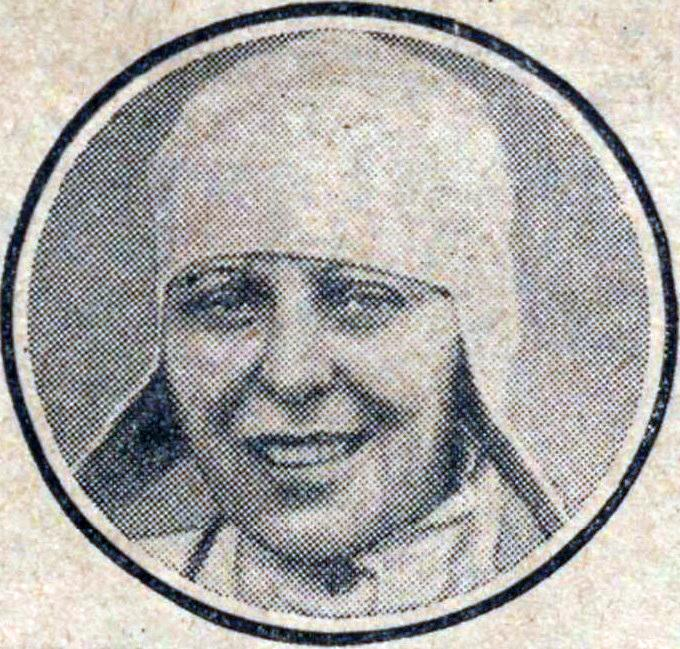
- Lucy O'Reilly Schell in 1930.
- Born: October 26, 1896; Paris, France
- Died: June 8, 1952 (aged 55)
- Occupations: Racing driver; Team owner

Lucy O'Reilly Schell (26 October 1896 – 8 June 1952) was an American racing driver, team owner, and businesswoman. Her racing endeavours focused mainly on Grand Prix and rallying. She was the first American woman to compete in an international Grand Prix race and the first woman to establish her own Grand Prix team.

== Biography ==
O'Reilly Schell's grandparents had emigrated to the US from Ireland during the Great Famine. Her father was Francis Patrick O'Reilly, whose construction business and later investments in factories near Reading, Pennsylvania had made him wealthy. In January 1896 Francis married Henriette Celestine Roudet in Brunoy, France. Nine months later Lucy was born in Paris. She would be the couple's only child.

Before the outbreak of World War I, O'Reilly met Selim Laurence "Laury" Schell. Schell, who had been born in Geneva and lived mainly in France, was the son of an American diplomat. In the early days of the war O'Reilly worked as a nurse, caring for injured servicemen in a Parisian military hospital. In April 1915 she decamped for the United States, accompanied by her mother, Laury Schell, and Schell's brother. Two years later she and Laury Schell returned to Paris to marry. When hostilities ended they took up residence in Paris.

The couple had two children. Harry in 1921, and Phillipe in 1926. Harry went on to become one of the first Formula One drivers from the United States, competing in the 1950s before dying in a racing crash at Silverstone in 1960.

In the late 1920s O'Reilly Schell began to seriously pursue her interest in motor racing. In 1936 O'Reilly Schell inherited her father's estate, which she used to fund development of racing cars tailored to her requirements.

On 18 October 1939 Laury died in a car crash in France. O'Reilly Schell was seriously injured in the same accident.

In the early years of WWII, O'Reilly Schell moved her family back to the US.

O'Reilly Schell died in Monte Carlo, Monaco. She was initially interred in a cemetery in Monte Carlo, but her remains were later relocated to the family tomb in Brunoy, France, where her husband and eventually both of her sons were also buried.

Although she lived much of her life in France, O'Reilly Schell thought of herself as an American.

== Driving career ==
The 1927 Grand Prix de la Baule was O'Reilly Schell's first major race. She finished twelfth in a Bugatti T37A. In 1928 O'Reilly Schell and the Bugatti finished eighth at la Baule, sixth at the Grand Prix de la Marne, and were winners of the Coupe de Bourgogne voiturette race. In 1929 she appeared at la Baule a third time, but was unclassified.

In 1929 her attention turned to rallying, when she finished in eighth place at the Monte Carlo rally and won a Coupe des Dames driving a Talbot M 67. She would return to this event several times in the following years in cars of different makes. She finished second once, and third twice, with her husband as co-driver.

Throughout the 1930s, O'Reilly Schell raced and rallied a variety of vehicles, including T37A and T44 Bugattis, and an M 67 Talbot.

At this time Delahaye was a venerable French automobile maker that had become better known as a builder of trucks than Grandes Routieres. Their cars were called "the perfect car to drive in a funeral procession." In 1933 Madame Desmarais, widow of one of the original partners and majority shareholder, decided to take Delahaye racing again. She directed the company's Manager of Operations, Charles Weiffenbach, to establish a racing department. A new chief engineer named Jean François was hired to develop cars suitable for the company's return to competition. The first results were the short wheelbase, four-cylinder 134 and the long wheelbase, six-cylinder 138.

In 1933, after the debut of the two new models at the Paris Salon de l'Automobile, Weiffenbach was visited at his office by O'Reilly Schell and her husband. O'Reilly Schell wanted Delahaye to build her a special car by putting the more powerful 3.2 L engine from the 138 in the shorter chassis of the 134. The resulting hybrid was called the Delahaye 135.

The Delahaye 135 is the car O'Reilly Schell would be most closely associated with. In subsequent years Delahaye introduced several variations on the theme, including the 135 Sport, 135 Coupe des Alpes, and 135 Compétition. Eventually O'Reilly Schell returned to the company with another request; she wanted a new version of the 135 built specifically for racing. As a demonstration of her determination to see the car built, O'Reilly Schell convinced a dozen like-minded individuals to place orders for the model. The finished product was called the 135 Compétition Spéciale, or 135 CS.

== Team owner ==
At the end of the 1936 racing season Delahaye dissolved their works racing team. O'Reilly Schell and her husband stepped in to fill the void, effectively becoming Delahaye's factory racing program.

The couple had established their own team, called Écurie Bleue. The goal was to create a racing team that was to France what Scuderia Ferrari was to Italy. To that end, the team's cars were painted French Blue, but of a slightly different shade than that of their compatriots at Talbot.

Drawing on her father's estate, O'Reilly Schell underwrote development of a new car commensurate with the team's ambitions. Under François' direction a brand new 4.5 L V12 engine was developed. The car, dubbed the 145 was released in 1936. As it was to play a dual role as both a Grand Prix and sports-racing car, it was bodied as a two-seat car.

The team's drivers eventually included Laury Schell, René Carrière, Joseph Paul, René Dreyfus, Gianfranco Comotti, René Le Bègue, and Comte George Raphaël Béthenod de Montbressieux, who raced under the nom de course of "Raph".

=== "Le Million", 1937 ===
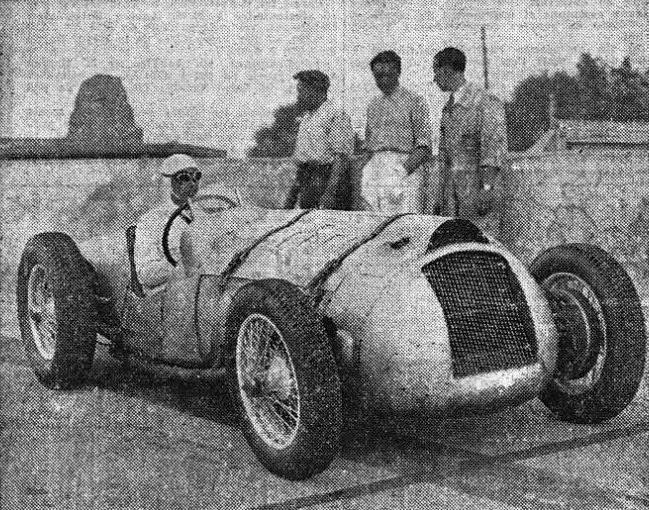
René Dreyfus in Delahaye 145 at the "Grand Prix du Million", Montlhéry, 27 August 1937

The mid-1930s Grand Prix racing scene saw the arrival of the German "Silver Arrows" teams of Mercedes-Benz and Auto Union. These two companies received financial support from the German Nazi government, which promoted German superiority in various endeavours, including auto racing, as a propaganda tool. The rising tide of anti-Semitism had also effectively blackballed driver René Dreyfus because of his Jewish heritage.

After the 1934 French Grand Prix, to counter the German juggernaut and ongoing competition from the Italian Alfa Romeos, the French government supported the "Société d'Étude et de Fabrication d'Automobiles de Course" (S.E.F.A.C.) in its attempt to develop a French Grand Prix car for the 750 kg formula. The project's finances were overseen by the "Comité de la Souscription Nationale pour le Fonds de Course". When the S.E.F.A.C. car proved uncompetitive, and with strong support from the Automobile Club of France among others, the Fonds de Course was repurposed as a prize offered to existing French manufacturers, funded by a surcharge on French drivers license renewals.

On 12 April 1937 Bugatti successfully completed the first performance challenges, and was awarded 400,000 FF from the fund.

The second performance challenge was called the "Grand Prix du Million", or simply "Le Million". This challenge promised a prize of 1,000,000 FF to the French manufacturer and team whose car was able to cover 200 km (124.3 mi) at a speed exceeding 146.5 km/h (91.0 mph) by the widest margin at the Montlhéry autodrome prior to 1 September 1937. On 27 August 1937, Delahaye 145 serial number 48771, fielded by Écurie Bleue and driven by Dreyfus, met and exceeded the requirements by the slimmest of margins. Bugatti returned to the track to try to better the Delahaye's time, but were prevented by mechanical breakdowns, and were unable to mount another challenge before the deadline passed.

The winnings were split evenly between Delahaye and Écurie Bleue. Schell in turn gave half of her team's share to Dreyfus.

After winning Le Million, O'Reilly Schell had a red and white stripe painted diagonally across the cars. Some have suggested that this was the first "racing stripe".

=== Grand Prix de Pau, 1938 ===
The first race of the 1938 Grand Prix season was the Pau Grand Prix, a non-Championship event scheduled for 10 April.

O'Reilly Schell's Écurie Bleue fielded two cars and drivers. Dreyfus was to drive the Le Million 145. Teammate Comotti was to pilot another 145 with a revised grille reminiscent of the 135.

New Grand Prix rules came into effect in 1938, bringing fresh competition. Mercedes would debut their new W154 at Pau. Drivers for Mercedes were Rudolph Caracciola and Hermann Lang. Alfa Romeo's new Tipo 308 was also expected to appear, fielded this year by Alfa Corse following the breakup of Scuderia Ferrari. Auto Union declined to appear at Pau.

During practice the Tipo 308 driven by Tazio Nuvolari caught fire and was withdrawn. As a precaution the other 308 driven by Emilio Villoresi was also withdrawn. In addition, the Mercedes driven by Lang crashed during practice and was rendered unfit to race. Caracciola's W154 suffered with clutch slip and fouled sparkplugs.

When the race started, Caracciola took the lead. His W154 developed an estimated 468 bhp (349.0 kW), compared to the Delahaye V12's 230 bhp (171.5 kW). The twisty road course limited the ability of the Mercedes to use its greater power. Dreyfus was able to keep pace, and even to overtake Caracciola, although he was overtaken again. As the race went on, the track became slippery with oil and rubber, further reducing Caracciola's ability to use the Mercedes' power.

The Delahaye had one great advantage; a much lower rate of fuel consumption than the supercharged Mercedes. At the halfway point in the race when Caracciola pitted for fuel, he also turned to car over to Lang, the many gear changes having aggravated a previous leg injury. Dreyfus took the lead, and pressed on in what for him had become a non-stop race, having sufficient fuel to cover the remaining distance.

Dreyfus finished in first place, beating the W154 by over two minutes. The Caracciola/Lang W154 was second, and Comotti brought the other Écurie Bleue 145 home in third place.

Following the German invasion of France it is rumoured that Hitler issued instructions that the Pau car, chassis 48771, be seized. To prevent the car from being destroyed the Le Million 145 and others were disassembled and hidden.

=== Grand Prix de l'ACF, 1938 ===
Three of Écurie Bleue's 145s were registered for the Grand Prix de l'ACF 1938. The driver's were to have been Dreyfus, Comotti and an unnamed third.

In February 1938 the French government added another million Francs to the pool to encourage French racing manufacturers. Écurie Bleue had successfully produced a car that not only won the first million franc prize, but won the Pau Grand Prix against both their formidable German and Italian competition, and won again at Cork against a reduced field. O'Reilly Schell wanted additional funding to finish her next automotive project; the Delahaye 155 single-seater. Instead of the second prize going to Delahaye and Écurie Bleue, 600,000 FF went to Talbot.

Even though their cars were already registered, Écurie Bleue decided to boycott the French Grand Prix held 3 July 1938. None of their cars or drivers appeared.

In 1939 the team purchased two Maserati 8CTF monopostos that were entered in that year's Swiss Grand Prix.

O'Reilly Schell moved her team to Monaco shortly afterwards. After the end of the 1939 season, following the death of Laury Schell, the team was renamed Écurie Lucy O'Reilly Schell.

=== Indianapolis, 1940 ===
In 1940 Écurie Lucy O'Reilly Schell entered their two recently acquired Maseratis in the 1940 Indianapolis 500. One year earlier Wilbur Shaw won at Indy in Maserati 8CTF 3032.

In May 1940 drivers Dreyfus and Le Bègue traveled to the US on a ship named the Conte di Savoia. Also traveling with the team was Luigi Chinetti, who was to act as mechanic.

Le Bègue qualified chassis 3030 in thirty-first position. Due to Dreyfus being unaware of Indy's unique rules for qualifying, he did not qualify in chassis 3031. He asked for and was given permission to lap the track again. Dreyfus borrowed 3030 for this run, which broke a connecting rod during the attempt and holed the block. The engine from 3031 was transferred to 3030, and the two drivers shared the car, with Le Bègue driving the first 250 miles, and Dreyfus the last.

Dreyfus and Le Bègue brought the shared car to a tenth-place finish, having completed 192 of the 200 laps.

Following the race the cars were sold to Lou Moore, who rebranded them as the Elgin Piston Pin Specials.

Both Dreyfus and Chinetti opted to remain in the US after Indy. O'Reilly Schell helped Dreyfus get his US citizenship.

== Racing history ==
=== Driver ===
1927

- Twelfth in the 1927 Grand Prix automobile de La Baule (her first race).

1928

- Eighth in the 1928 Grand Prix de la Baule in a Bugatti T37A.
- Fourth in the 1928 4 Hour Grand Prix automobile de Bourgogne in a Bugatti T37A, winner of the voiturette class.
- Second in the second race of the eighth and last Grand Prix du M.C.F. for cyclecars in 1928 at Montlhéry in a Bugatti T37A.

1929

- Eighth overall and a Coupe des dames at the 1929 Monte Carlo Rally in a 2 L Talbot M 67.

1931

- Third in the 1931 Monte Carlo Rally in a Bugatti.

1932

- Seventh in the 1932 Monte Carlo Rally in a Bugatti (with codriver Laury).
- Tenth in the 1932 Grand Prix de La Baule in an Alfa Romeo 6C 1750.

1934

- Coupe des dames in the 1934 Critérium Paris-Nice

1935

- Coupe des dames in the 1935 Paris-Nice Critérium 1935, and fourth overall in a 1.6L Delahaye.
- Third in the 1935 Monte Carlo Rally in a Delahaye.
- Sixth in the 1935 Grand Prix de la Marne.

1936

- Second in the 1936 Monte Carlo Rally with her husband, in a 6-cylinder Delahaye Sport 18CV, 2/5 of a second behind the winner.
- Épreuve de vitesse at Montlhéry and the Poughes hillclimb stage of the 1936 Rallye Paris - Saint-Raphaël Féminin.

1937

- Épreuve de vitesse at the Montlhéry stage of the 1937 Rallye Paris - Saint-Raphaël Féminin.

1938

- Grand Prix for coupés in April 1938 at the Cannes Concours d'élégance, in a Delahaye cabriolet with bodywork by Figoni.
- Juan-les-Pins Concours d'élégance in May 1938, in a Delahaye cabriolet with bodywork by Henri Chapron.

=== Team owner ===
1936

- 1936 Paris-Nice Critérium (L. Schell, first; R, Carrière, second)
- 1936 Mont Ventoux hillclimb (R. Carrière)
- 1936 Nice - La Turbie hillclimb leg of the 1936 Paris-Nice Critérium (L. Schell)
- 1936 1936 3 Hours of Marseille (triple: "Michel Paris", first; L. Schell, second; R. Brunet, third)
- 1936 Spa 24 Hours (L. Schell/R. Carrière, third in a 135)
- 1936 Grand Prix de l'ACF (L. Schell/R. Carrière, fourth in a 135)
- Coupe-Challenge de L'Auto permanently awarded to Delahaye based on the efforts of Écurie Bleue

1937

- 1937 Paris-Nice Critérium (J. Paul)
- 1937 Nice - La Turbie hillclumb leg of the Paris-Nice Critérium, 3 to 5L class (L. Schell)
- Winner of the 1937 Prince Rainier II Cup (L. Schell, first; J. Paul, second)
- 1937 Coupe de Printemps 1937 (J. Paul)
- 1937 24 Hours of Le Mans (R. Dreyfus/H. Stoffel, third in a 135)
- 1937 Mille Miglia (L. Schell/R. Carrière, third overall, winner in the naturally aspirated category in a 135)
- 1937 Grand Prix de l'ACF (R. Carrière, fourth in a 135)
- 1937 Tunis Grand Prix (L. Schell/R. Carrièr, fourth in a 135)
- 1937 Algerian Grand Prix (R. Carrière, fourth in a 135)
- 1937 3 Hours of Marseille (R. Carrière, fourth in a 135)
- 1937 Pau Grand Prix (R. Carrière, sixth in a 135)

1938

- 1938 Pau Grand Prix (R. Dreyfus)
- 1938 Cork Grand Prix (R. Dreyfus)
- 1938 Nice - La Turbie hillclimb, Sports category (R. Dreyfus)
- 1938 Mille Miglia (R. Dreyfus/M. Varet, fourth in a 135)
- 1938 German Grand Prix (R. Dreyfus, fifth)

1939

- 1939 German Grand Prix (R. Dreyfus, fourth; "Raph", fifth)
- 1939 Monte Carlo Rally (J. Paul)
- Seventh and Ninth in the Grand Prix de l'ACF in Delahaye 145s (R. Dreyfus, seventh; "Raph", ninth)

1940

- 1940 Indianapolis 500 (R. Dreyfus/R. Le Bègue, tenth in a Maserati 8CTF)

== Photo gallery ==
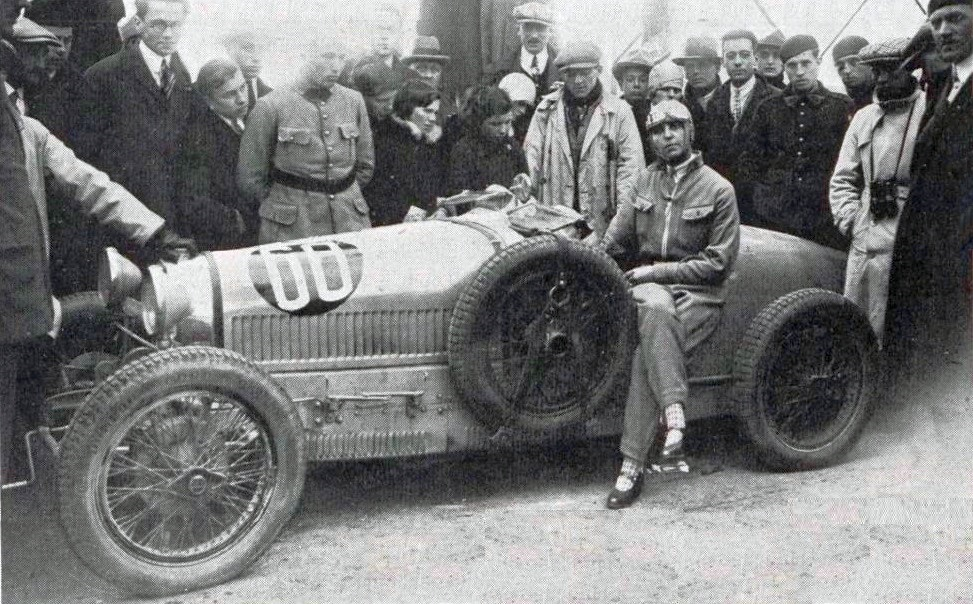
Lucy O'Reilly Schell at the 1928 Coupe de Bourgogne, in a Bugatti 37A.

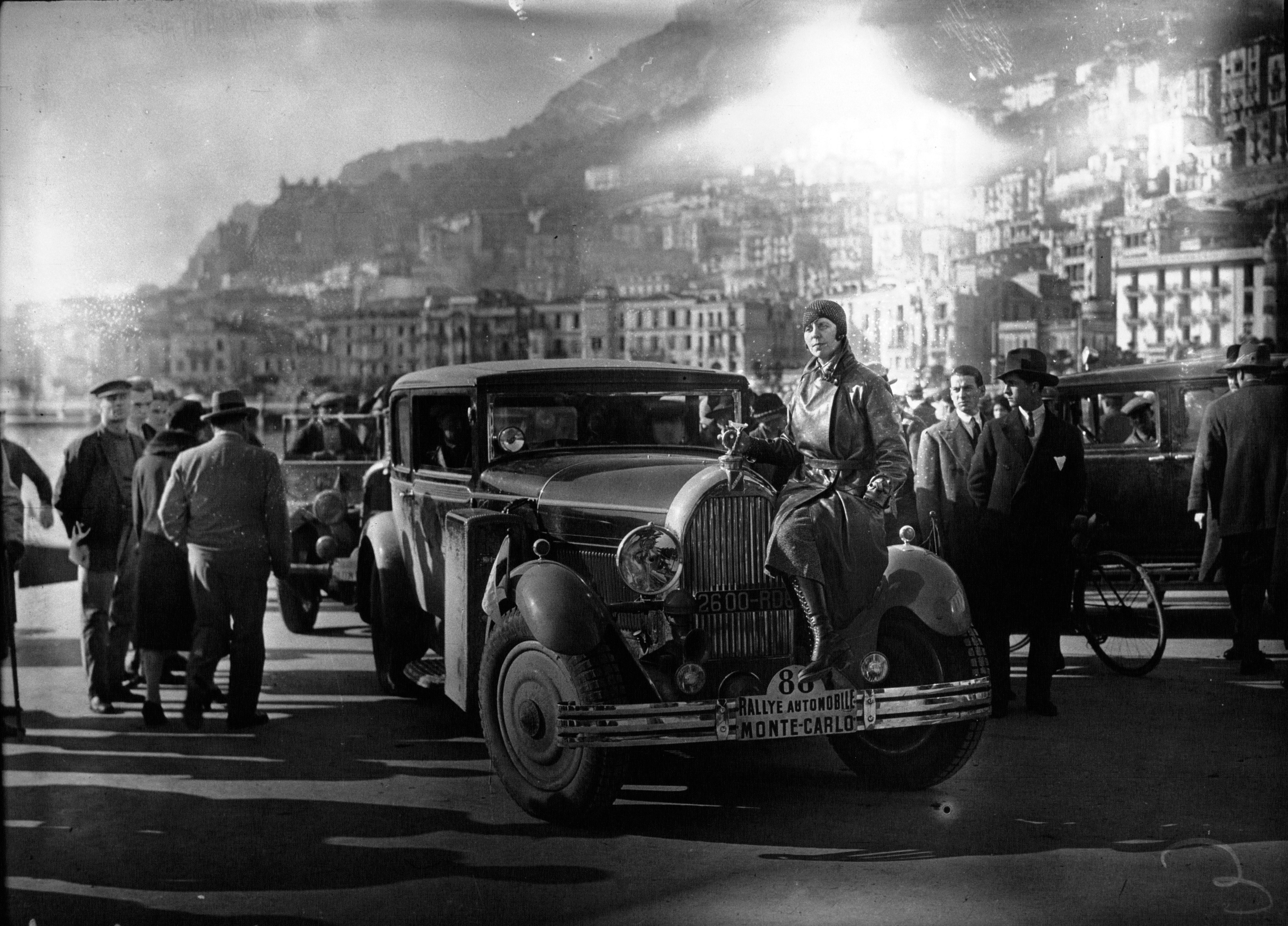
Lucy O'Reilly Schell at the 1930 Monte Carlo Rally, in a Talbot.

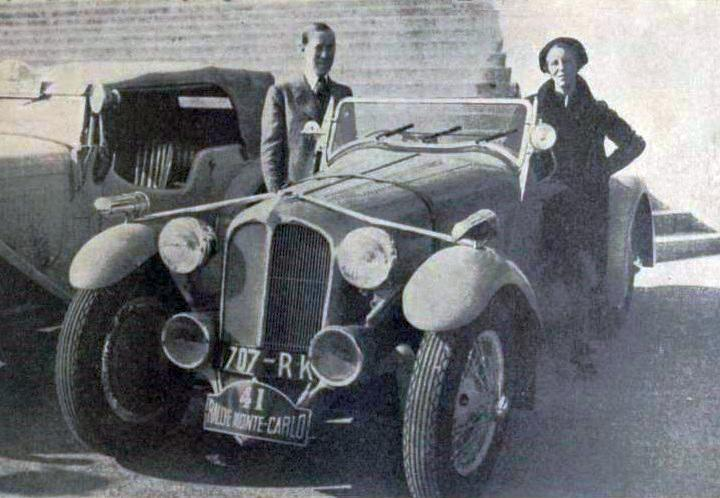
Laury Schell and Lucy O'Reilly Schell, second in the 1936 Monte Carlo rally in a 6 cylinder Delahaye 18CV Sport.

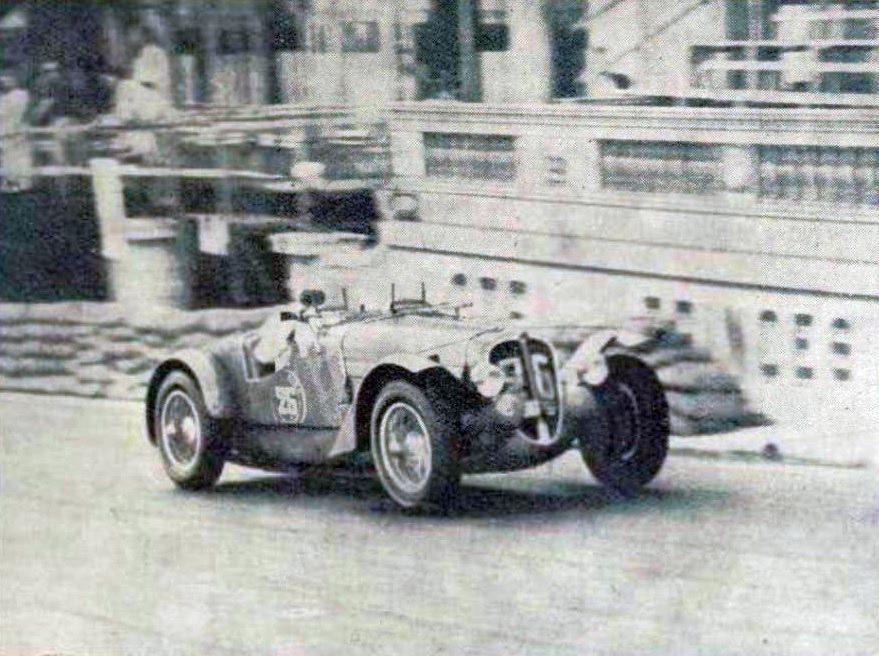
Laury Schell, won the Prince Rainier II Cup in August 1937 in Monaco, in a 3.5L Delahaye.

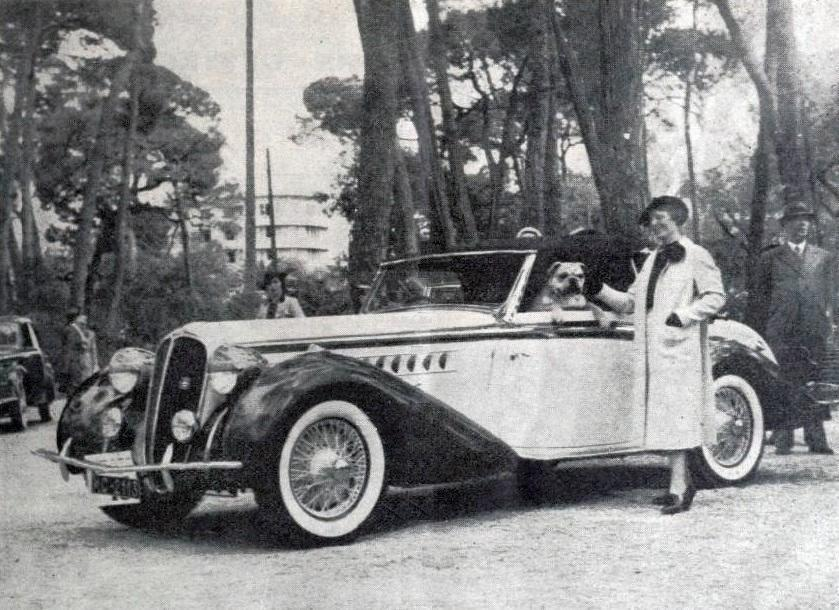
Lucy O'Reilly Schell won the Concours d'élegance automobile de Juan-les-Pins in May 1938, in a Delahaye cabriolet with Chapron bodywork.

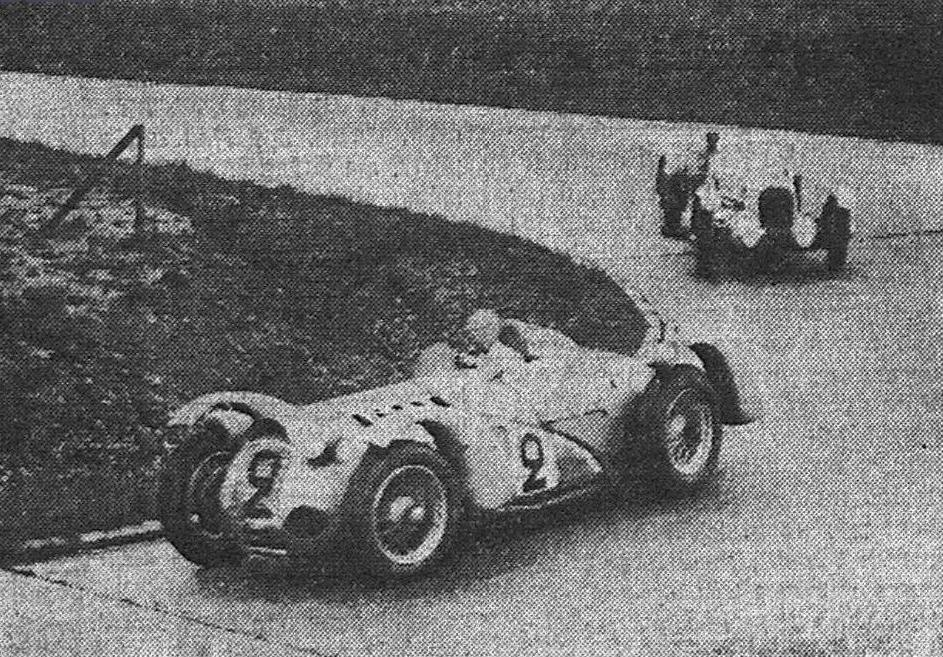
Dreyfus and Divo in an Écurie Bleue Delahaye 145 in the 1938 12 Hours of Paris.
