= 1938 Pau Grand Prix =

Race details
- Date: 10 April 1938
- Official name: Grand Prix de Pau
- Location: Pau, France
- Course: Temporary Street Circuit
- Course length: 2.760 km (1.720 miles)
- Distance: 100 laps, 276.960 km (172.100 miles)

Pole position
Driver	(France) René Dreyfus	Delahaye 145
- Time: 1:48.0

Fastest lap
Driver	(Germany) Rudolf Caracciola	Mercedes-Benz W154
- Time: 1:47.0

Podium
First	(France) René Dreyfus	Delahaye 145
Second	(Germany) Rudolf Caracciola; (Germany) Hermann Lang	Mercedes-Benz W154
Third	(Italy) Gianfranco Comotti	Delahaye 145

The 1938 Pau Grand Prix was a motor race held on 10 April 1938 at the Pau circuit, in Pau, Pyrénées-Atlantiques, France.

For 1938, new rules were in effect, limiting engine size, and also the size of the field, as few cars were ready to race. The non-championship Grand Prix was won by René Dreyfus, driving the Delahaye 145 Million Franc Race winning car owned by Lucy O'Reilly Schell. The Delahaye V12 did not consume as much fuel as other engines and could finish the race without having to pit.

Rudolf Caracciola and Hermann Lang each entered a new Mercedes-Benz W154, but Lang crashed in practise. When Caracciola had to make a pit stop for refuelling, Lang took over, thus they combined to finish second, narrowly beaten by a heroic drive of Dreyfus. Gianfranco Comotti in another Delahaye finished third, 6 laps down.

The new Alfa Romeo Tipo 308 had problems and did not start. A split fuel tank even made Tazio Nuvolari retire from racing.

== Classification ==
=== Race ===
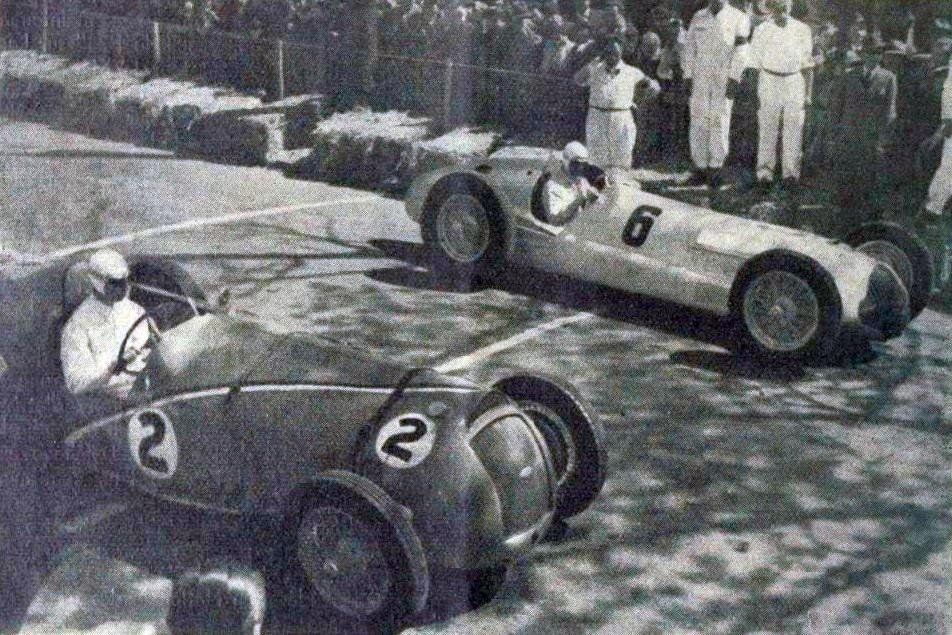
Pole sitter René Dreyfus in the Delahaye 145 and Caracciola in the Mercedes W154 on the starting grid

Pos	No	Driver	Vehicle	Laps	Time/Retired	Grid
1	2	(France) René Dreyfus	Delahaye 145	100	3hr 08min 59.0sec	1
2	6	(Germany) Rudolf Caracciola (Germany) Hermann Lang	Mercedes-Benz W154	100	+ 1:51.0 s	2
3	4	(Italy) Gianfranco Comotti	Delahaye 145	94	+ 6 laps	3
4	20	(France) "Raph"	Maserati 6CM	85	+ 15 laps	8
5	28	(France) Maurice Trintignant	Bugatti T35C	83	+ 17 laps	6
6	24	(Italy) Dioscoride Lanza	Maserati 6CM	81	+ 19 laps	5
Ret	30	(France) Yves Matra	Bugatti T51	40	Retired	7
Ret	22	(Italy) Antonio Negro	Maserati 6CM	9	Steering	9
DNS	8	(Germany) Hermann Lang	Mercedes-Benz W154		Did Not Start	
DNS	12	(Italy) Tazio Nuvolari	Alfa Romeo Tipo 308		Did Not Start	
DNS	14	(Italy) Emilio Villoresi	Alfa Romeo Tipo 308		Did Not Start	

Preceded by 1937 Pau Grand Prix	Pau Grand Prix; 1938	Succeeded by 1939 Pau Grand Prix
