= Franay =

French coachbuilding company

Franay was a French coachbuilder operating at Levallois-Perret, a suburb on the prosperous north-western edge of Paris. The company was founded in 1903 by Jean-Baptiste Franay, a carriage upholsterer, following an apprenticeship with Binder. It was later taken over by his son, Marius. Franay car body production stopped in late 1955.

== History ==
Carrosserie Franay was founded by Jean-Baptiste Franay, a trained saddler who had completed his training with the carriage manufacturer Henri Binder. In 1903, Franay started his own repair business, which later became a manufacturer of automobile bodies. The company was based in the Paris suburb of Levallois-Perret. After the First World War, Marius Franay, the founder's son, took over management of the company.

In the period between the world wars, Franay dressed chassis from Bentley, Bugatti, Delage, Delahaye, Duesenberg, Hispano-Suiza, Packard and Rolls-Royce, among others.

After the Second World War, Marius Franay took over the chairmanship of the Association of French Car Body Manufacturers (Chambre Syndicale de la Carosserie Française). Among the first new cars that Franay built after the end of the war were various Rolls-Royces and Talbots. At least six drophead coupés (convertibles) based on the Rolls-Royce Silver Wraith and at least one sedan were built, primarily in 1947 and 1948. They also built special bodies for the Talbot-Lago T26 Grand Sport; From 1947 to 1949, at least eight sporty coupés, as well as some convertibles, were built on the short chassis, each of which differed in terms of their designs.

Furthermore, in the first post-war years, Franay often provided older pre-war chassis with new bodies, including a Bugatti Type 57 chassis manufactured in 1936, which was given a pontoon-style convertible body. Other bodies for Bentley and Rolls-Royce, produced around the same time, continued to follow the traditional style with sculpted front and rear fenders or repeated the striking Art Deco designs of the pre-war period.

One of Franay's last works was a four-door representative limousine for the French President René Coty based on the Citroën Traction Avant with a "three-box" modern body. The pontoon-style notchback body was designed by Philippe Charbonneaux. The car, registered with the license plate 2 PR 75, was used on official occasions from 1955, including a state visit by the British Queen Elizabeth II in 1957. Due to long-term use at walking pace, the car overheated during a parade and had to be driven in front of the eyes of the people public. In order to save money, the limousine shared some parts with other mass market cars, including windscreen and bumpers from a Ford Comète, wheel trims from a Ford Vendôme, the rear window from a Buick and the tail lights from a Chevrolet.

Franay car body production stopped in late 1955.

Marius Franay was also involved in the film industry as owner of the Industrial Society synchronization and society Cinematographic prints, St. Cloud.

== Gallery ==
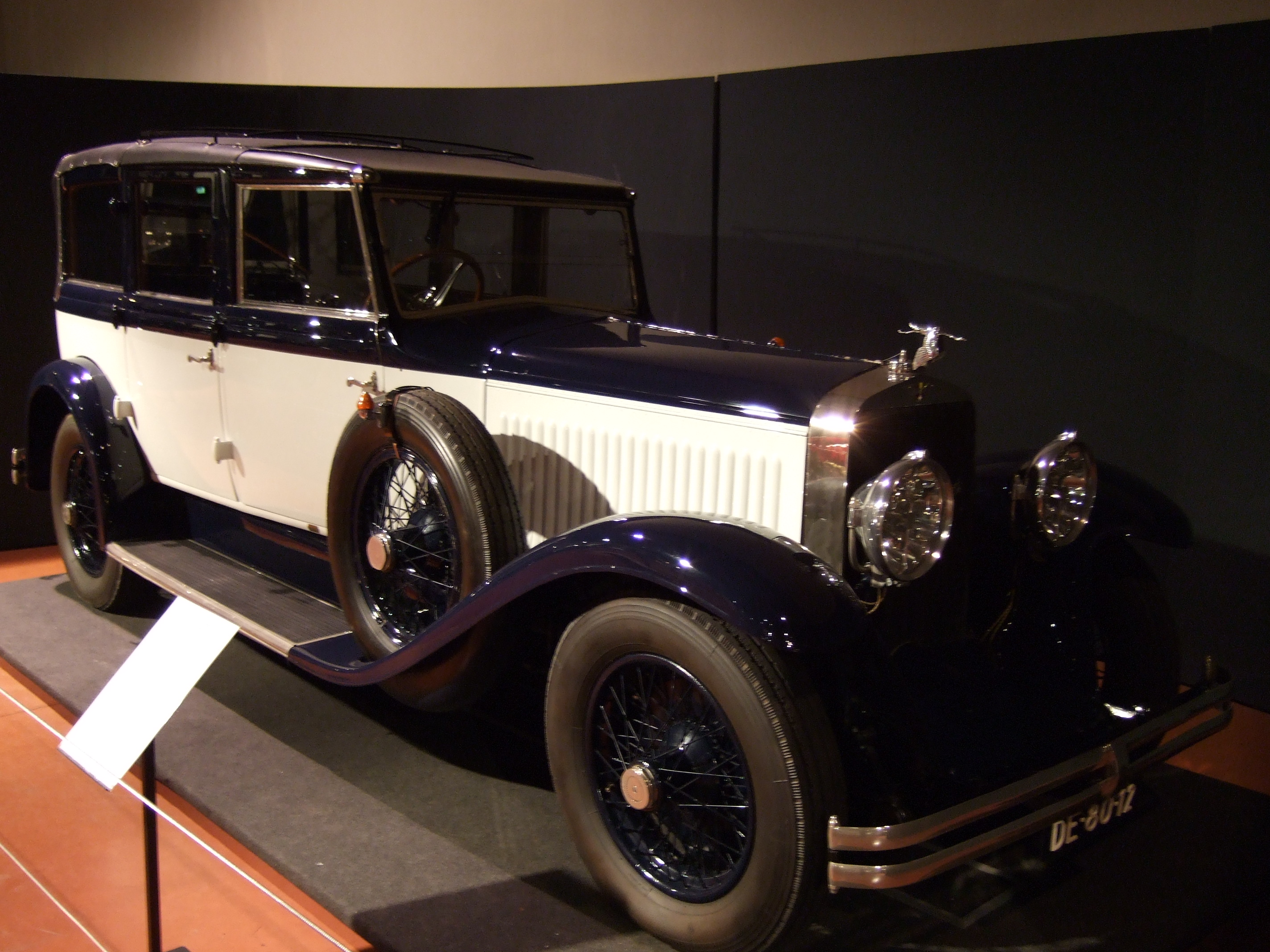
1924 Hispano-Suiza H6B Franay Landaulette

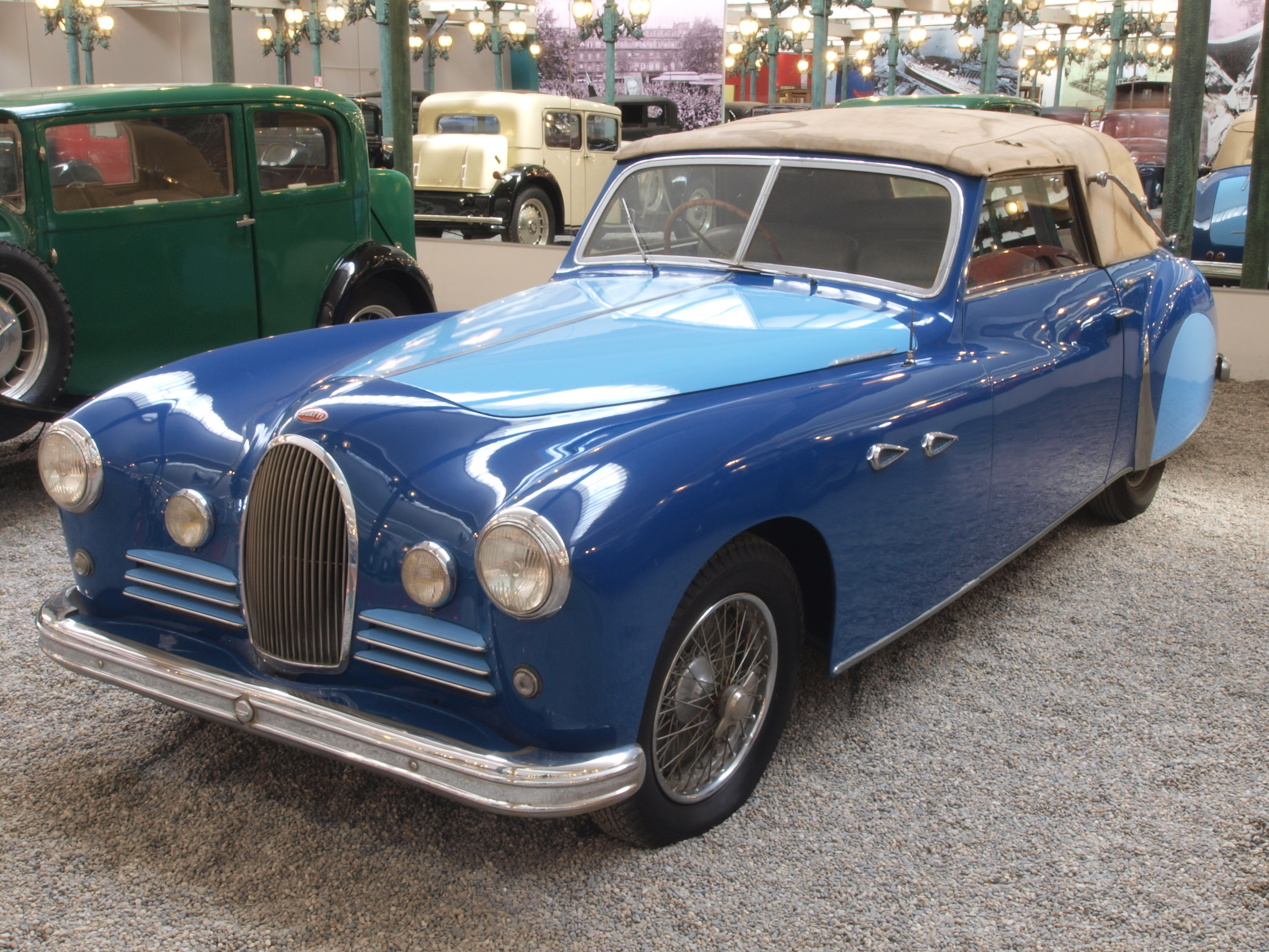
Bugatti Type 57 (chassis from 1936, new body after World War II)

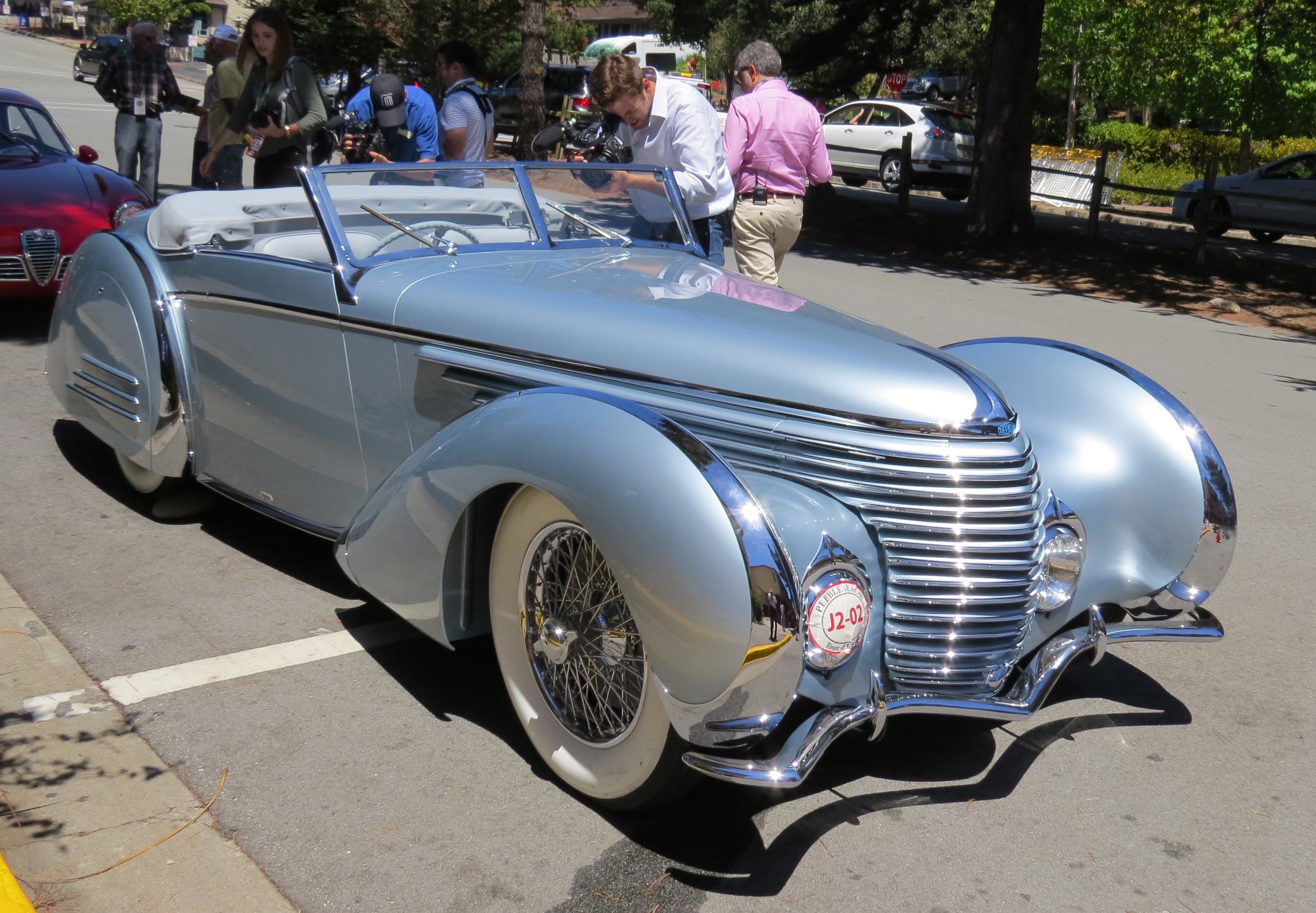
1937 Delahaye 145 Franay Cabriolet

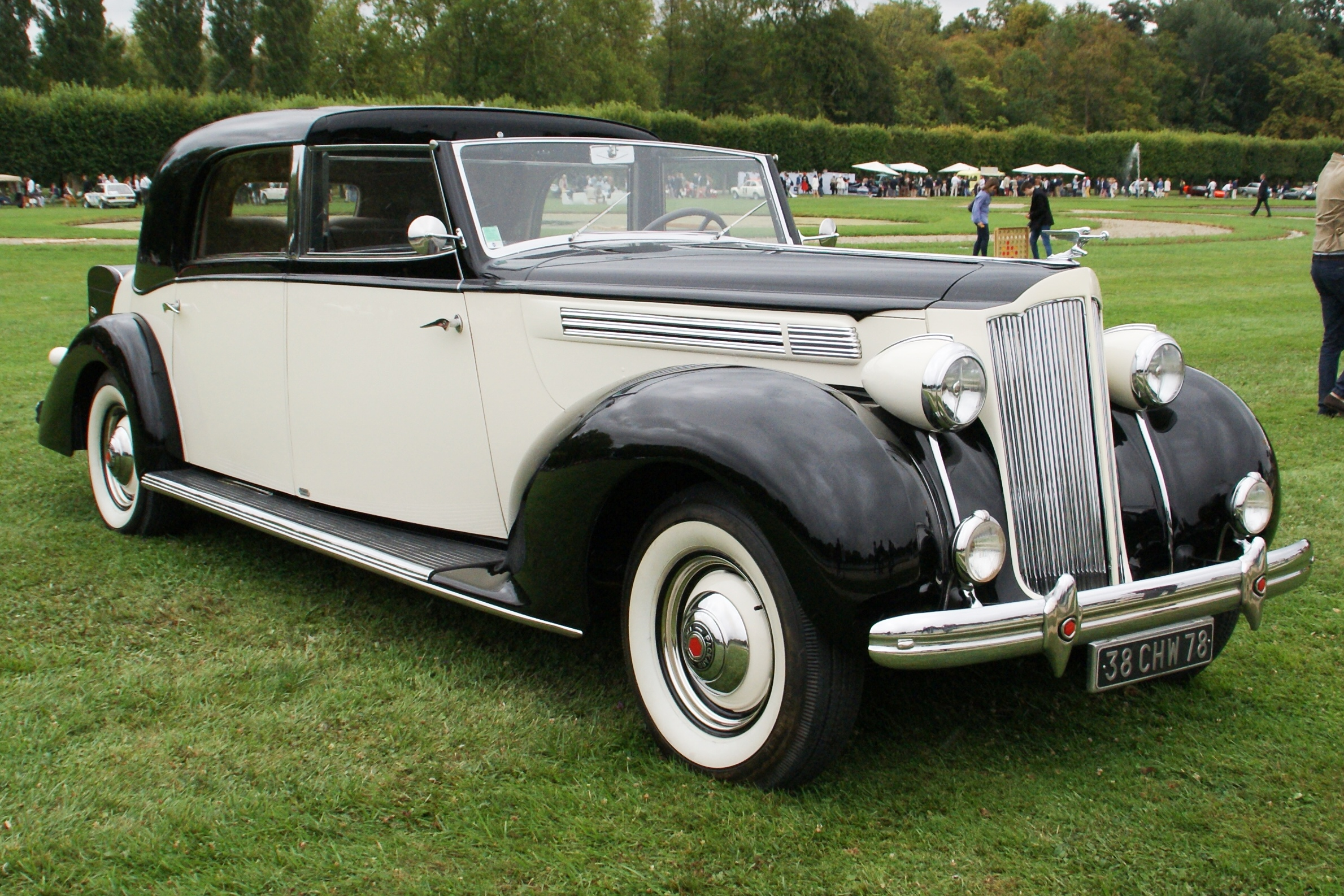
1938 Packard Eight 1602 Coupé Chauffeur by Franay

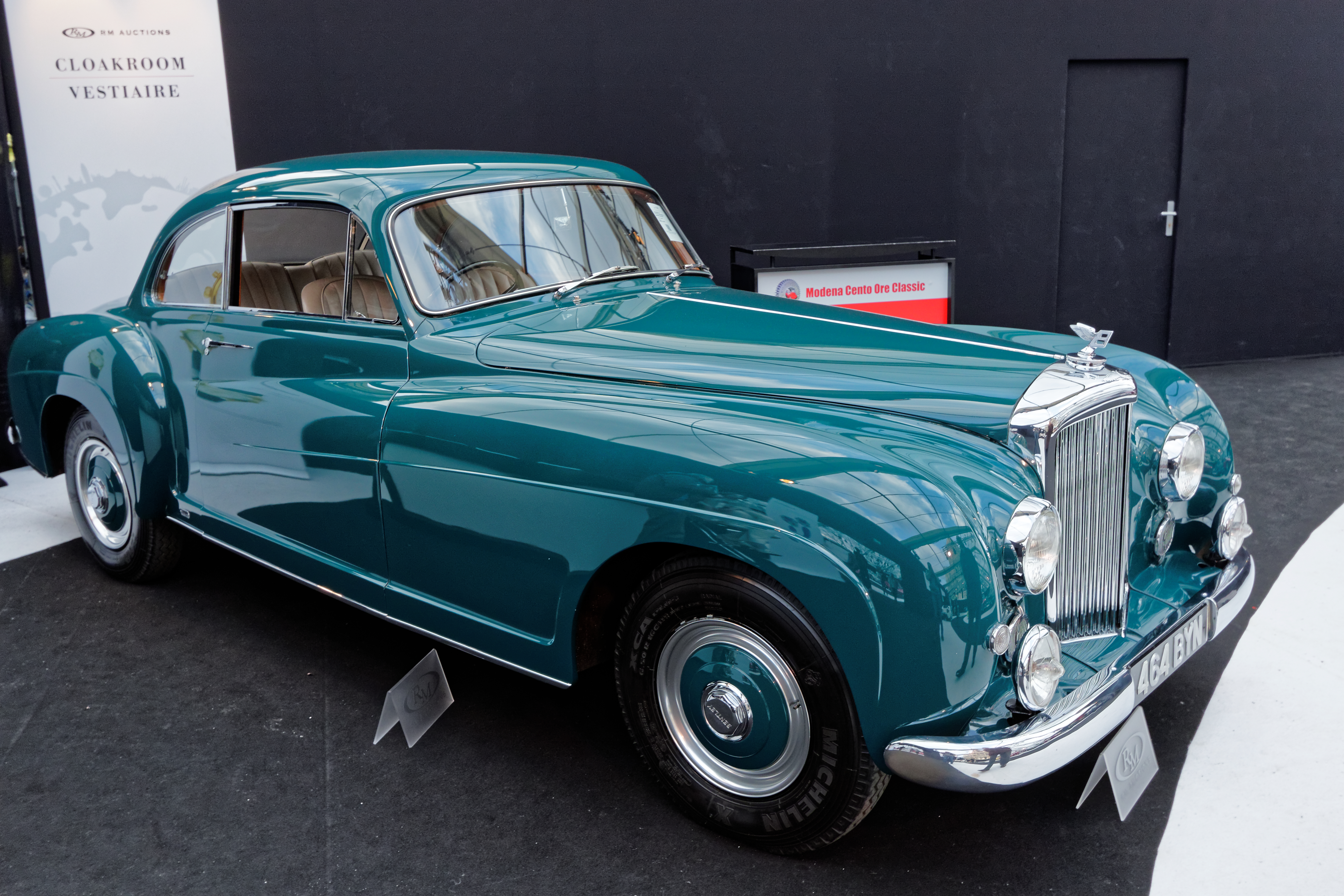
1955 Bentley R Type Continental by Franay
