= 1937 Pau Grand Prix =

Race details
- Date: 21 February 1937
- Official name: Grand Prix de Pau
- Location: Pau, France
- Course: Temporary Street Circuit
- Course length: 2.760 km (1.720 miles)
- Distance: 80 laps, 221.500 km (137.633 miles)

Pole position
| Driver | (France) Jean-Pierre Wimille | Bugatti T59S |

Fastest lap
| Driver | (France) Raymond Sommer | Talbot-Lago T150C |
- Time: 1:54.0

Podium
| First | (France) Jean-Pierre Wimille | Bugatti T59S |
| Second | (France) Raymond Sommer | Talbot-Lago T150C |
| Third | (France) René Dreyfus | Delahaye 135C |

The 1937 Pau Grand Prix was a motor race held on 21 February 1937 at the Pau circuit, in Pau, Pyrénées-Atlantiques, France. The Grand Prix was won by Jean-Pierre Wimille, driving the Bugatti T59S. Raymond Sommer finished second and René Dreyfus third.

== Classification ==
=== Race ===
| Pos | No | Driver | Vehicle | Laps | Time/Retired | Grid |
|---|---|---|---|---|---|---|
| 1 | 16 | (France) Jean-Pierre Wimille | Bugatti T59S | 80 | 2hr 41min 15.0sec | 1 |
| 2 | 8 | (France) Raymond Sommer | Talbot-Lago T150C | 79 | + 1 lap | 2 |
| 3 | 4 | (France) René Dreyfus | Delahaye 135C | 79 | + 1 lap | 2 |
| 4 | 2 | (France) Albert Divo | Talbot-Lago T150C | 78 | + 2 laps | 2 |
| 5 | 18 | (France) "Raph" | Delahaye 135 | 78 | + 2 laps | 2 |
| 6 | 10 | (France) René Carrièrè | Delahaye 135C | 78 | + 2 laps | 2 |
| 7 | 28 | (France) Eugène Chaboud | Delahaye 135 | 76 | + 4 laps | 2 |
| 8 | 20 | (France) Philippe Maillard-Brune | Delahaye 135 | 75 | + 5 laps | 2 |
| 9 | 6 | (United States) Laury Schell | Delahaye 135C | 75 | + 5 laps | 2 |
| 10 | 26 | (France) Joseph Paul | Delahaye 135 | 72 | + 8 laps | 2 |
| 11 | 22 | (France) Raymond de Saugé | Bugatti 575 | 69 | + 11 laps | 2 |
| Ret | 12 | (France) Albert Perrot | Delahaye 135 | | Retired | |
| Ret | 14 | (France) Robert Brunet | Delahaye 135 | | Retired | |
| Ret | 24 | (Thailand) B. Bira | Delahaye 135 | | Retired | |

| Preceded by 1936 Pau Grand Prix | Pau Grand Prix; 1937 | Succeeded by 1938 Pau Grand Prix |
