= René Dreyfus =

French racing driver (1905–1993)

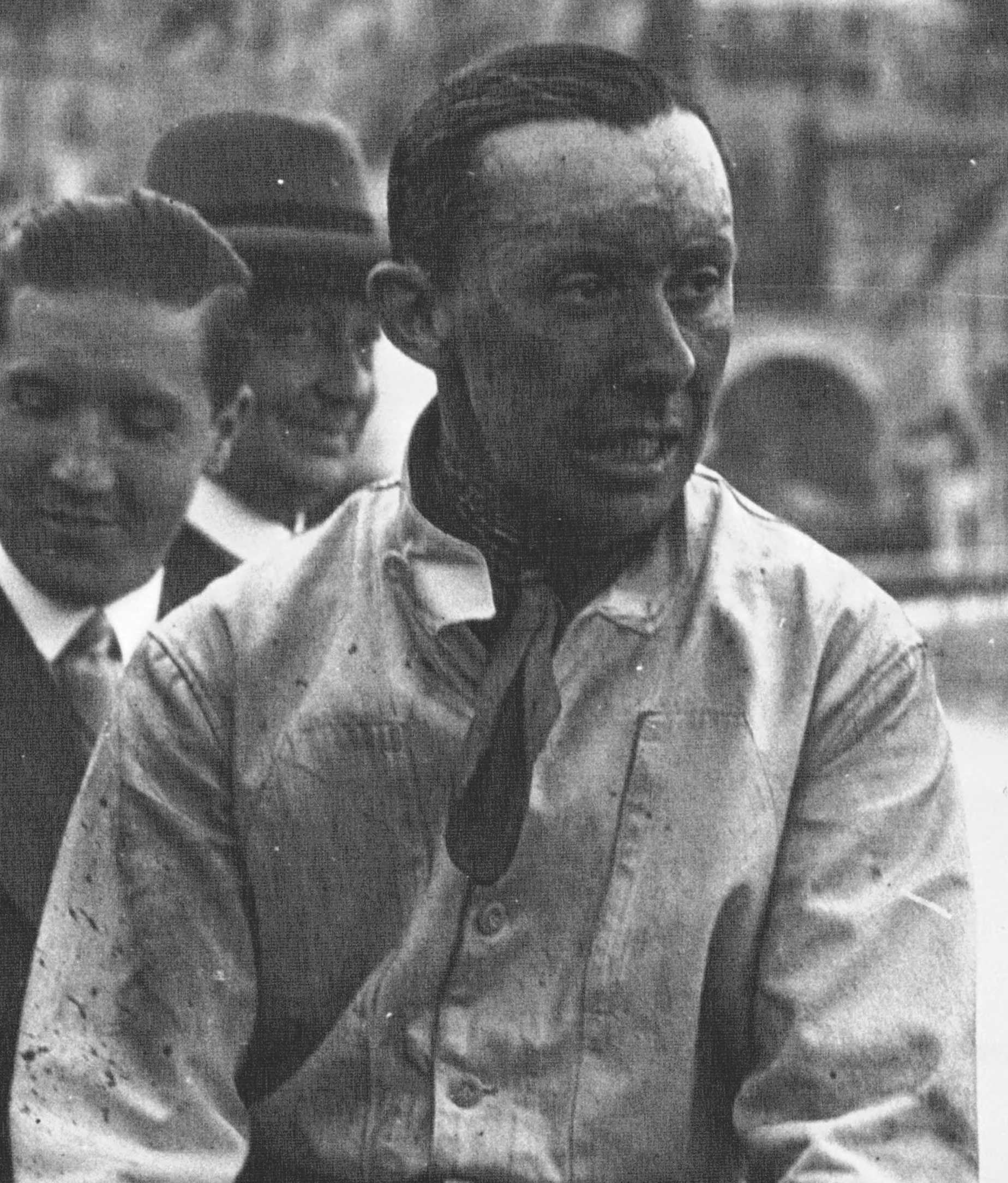
- Dreyfus at the 1930 Monaco Grand Prix
- Born: René Albert Dreyfus; 6 May 1905 Nice, Alpes-Maritimes, France
- Died: 16 August 1993 (aged 88) Manhattan, New York, U.S.

Championship titles
- Major victories Monaco Grand Prix (1930)

Champ Car career
- 1 race run over 1 year
- Best finish: 21st (1940)
- First race: 1940 Indianapolis 500 (Indianapolis)
Wins	Podiums	Poles
0	0	0

24 Hours of Le Mans career
- Years: 1937–1938, 1952
- Teams: Ecurie Bleue, Chinetti
- Best finish: 3rd (1937)
- Class wins: 0

René Albert Dreyfus (6 May 1905 – 16 August 1993) was a French racing driver active during the 1930s and 1940s.

== Early life ==
Dreyfus was born and raised in Nice to a Jewish family. He showed an early interest in automobiles, learning to drive before the age of nine. The middle of three children, his brother Maurice served as his business partner in his youth, and his manager in his racing career.

== Career ==
=== Driving career ===
Dreyfus drove Maseratis, Ferraris, Delahayes, and Bugattis against expert drivers and won 36 races across Europe, including Monaco, Florence, Rheims, Belgium, Cork, Dieppe, Pau, and at Tripoli in North Africa.

Dreyfus acquired a Bugatti and joined the Moto Club de Nice for younger competitive automotive enthusiasts. In 1924 he won his class in the first amateur race he entered, being the only entrant in the class, and went on to win three consecutive French Riviera championships in the next five years. In 1929 he entered his first professional race, the inaugural Grand Prix of Monaco, finishing first in his class and fifth overall.

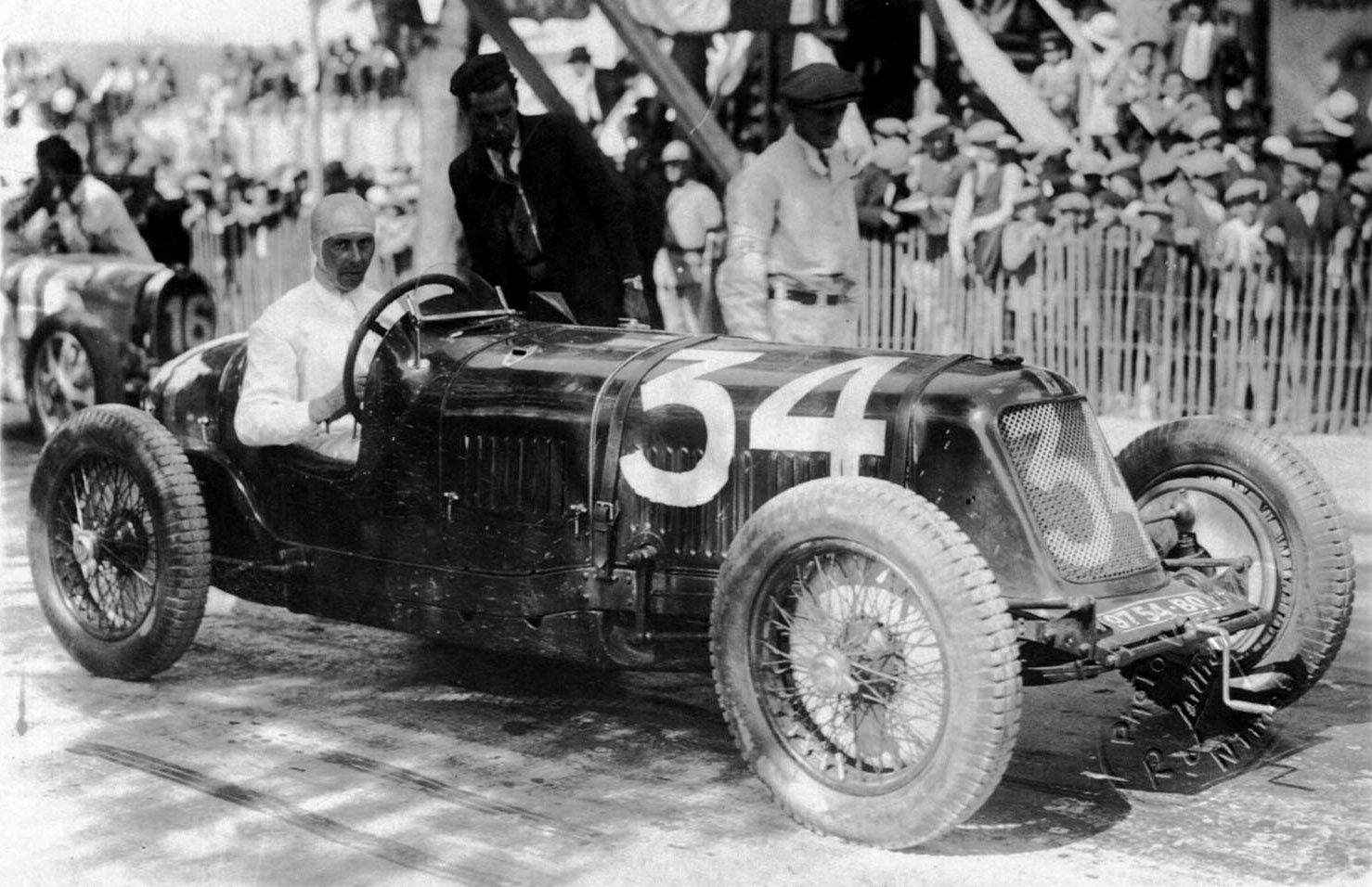
Dreyfus in a Maserati 26M at the Nîmes Grand Prix in 1932

The following year, Dreyfus won the 1930 Monaco Grand Prix outright in a Bugatti, beating by 22 seconds the highly regarded Bugatti factory team, led by William Grover-Williams, winner of the previous year, and local Louis Chiron. Realizing that factory cars were always faster than the cars owned by private entrants, Dreyfus reasoned that his only chance of winning lay in avoiding refueling stops, so he had additional fuel tanks added to his car with the intent of running the race without stop. This was not common practice at the time, since it was felt that fatigue would make it impossible, but Dreyfus' strategy proved correct.

The next few years saw Grand Prix racing become a metaphor for war, as the government of Germany chose this arena to prove their inherent superiority, supported the Mercedes-Benz and Auto Union racing teams, and gave the Silver Arrows seemingly unlimited money. This led to a remarkable era of competition, mainly between these to brands, with occasional underdog wins by other brands. While many of the best European drivers of the era, for instance Chiron, Achille Varzi, Tazio Nuvolari, Richard Seaman were hired by the German teams and jumped at the chance to drive the most advanced cars available, as a Jew this option was not available to Dreyfus. Instead he, like the few other underdogs competing against the German teams, had to defend his nation's pride by dint of heroic skill and daring in inferior machinery. Although France had been the birthplace of automobile racing, it now was a distant third in the racing hierarchy, behind the all-consuming German onslaught and the perennially victorious Italian Alfa Romeo and Maserati.

Prior to France getting occupied, Dreyfus traveled to the United States to compete in the 1940 Indianapolis 500 alongside fellow Frenchman René Le Bègue. Driving a pair of Maseratis for the American/French owner Lucy O'Reilly Schell, Le Bègue qualified 31st, but Dreyfus was bumped and ended up as the second alternate. On race day, it was decided for the two drivers to split time in the car, and each drove two stints of approximately 50 laps (125 miles) apiece. Le Bègue started the race and ran approximately laps 1–50 and laps 101–150. Dreyfus piloted the car for laps 51–100 and from 151 to the finish. The pair brought the car home in 10th place, flagged 8 laps down. A rainstorm prompted officials to flag the race after only the first three finishers received the checkered flag.

==== Later life ====
Dreyfus continued to race sporadically, including the 1952 24 Hours of Le Mans that was won by Mercedes. His last race was the 12 Hours of Sebring in 1955, when Stanley "Wacky" Arnolt asked Dreyfus to captain the Arnolt-Bristol Racing Team. Dreyfus led the team to the Sebring Team Trophy and 1–2–3 in class. He was invited to the 1980 Monaco Grand Prix to celebrate the 50th anniversary of his victory. At age 75, he personally drove throughout Europe touring all the sites of his racing career, receiving public celebration and honors at each stop. At the banquet following the race, he was brought to the stage to sit once again in the Bugatti in which he had won, half a century earlier. He was also Grand Marshal of the 1980 United States Grand Prix at Watkins Glen.

=== Government service ===
In an effort to induce manufacturers to develop new cars which would be competitive with the Germans, in 1937 the French government announced the 'Prix du Million', or the Million Franc Race. The prize money was a million francs, and in order to ensure that the competition tested each car's ultimate limits rather than just the driver's skill in passing other drivers, the race was a time trial against the clock at the treacherous Autodrome de Montlhéry track, which had taken the life of the great Antonio Ascari. Driving a Delahaye 145 for the Écurie Bleue team of Lucy O'Reilly Schell in testing and in the competition itself, Dreyfus risked death with a literally blistering pace, wearing the special Dunlop tires down to the fabric but handily overwhelming all competitors except the Bugatti team. On the last day of the competition he again went out on the track versus the Bugatti and again set an incredible pace, until he forced the Bugatti to the breaking point, winning the prize for Delahaye.

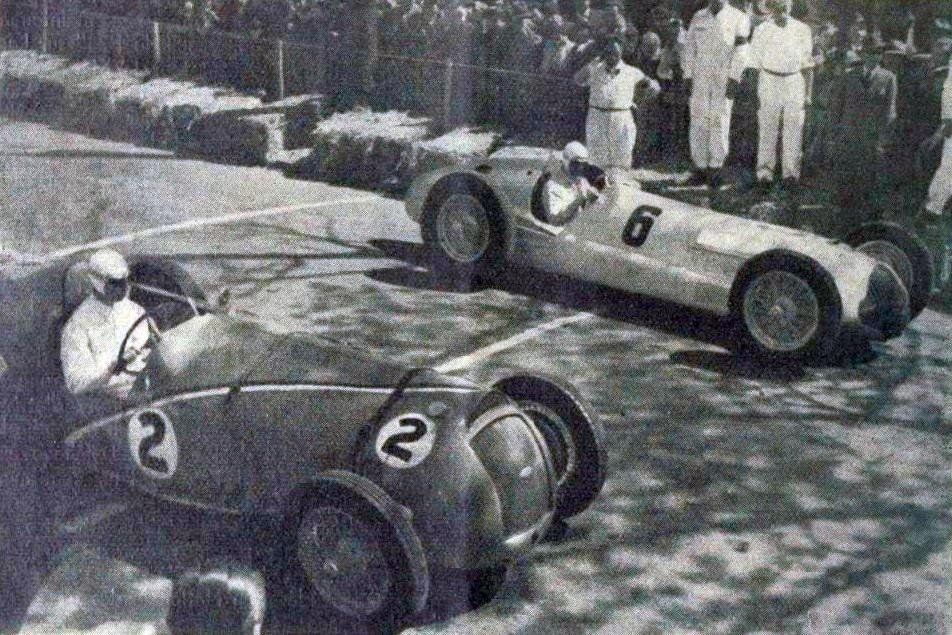
1938 Pau Grand Prix pole sitter Dreyfus in the Million Franc Delahaye 145 and Caracciola in the Mercedes W154 on the starting grid

For the 1938 Grand Prix season new rules were in effect, and few cars were ready, especially for the April 1938 Pau Grand Prix, a tight circuit running through village streets in the south of France. Two new Mercedes-Benz W154 showed up, one Silver Arrow crashed in practise. While the legendary Rudolf Caracciola had to make a pit stop and was relieved by Hermann Lang, Dreyfus drove the Million Franc Delahaye without stopping to the win, becoming a national hero in France. The country did not award additional funding to Delahaye, though, only to Bugatti and Talbot, thus the Delahayes of Schell were withdrawn from the July 1938 French Grand Prix that was dominated by Mercedes.

When World War II broke out in September 1939, Dreyfus joined the French Army, where he served as a truck driver. In 1940, however, he was abruptly sent by the French government to the United States to represent France by driving a Maserati in the 1940 Indianapolis 500. Although the previous year's race had been won by a Maserati driven by American Wilbur Shaw, neither Dreyfus nor his team partner René Le Bègue was familiar with the mechanical requirements and the very different rules of racing at Indianapolis; this problem was exacerbated by both drivers not knowing English, and by the American racing community's reluctance to see a European win the "Great American Race." Despite suffering numerous substantial setbacks and penalties for not understanding the details of the rules, beginning with their attempts to qualify their two cars, Dreyfus and Le Bègue succeeded in co-driving the one car which they did qualify from the back of the grid to tenth place. Shaw again won the race in another Maserati.

In the meantime, the Germans had overrun Paris, and as a Jew who had famously humiliated the German racing effort, Dreyfus was advised by the French government not to return to occupied France. Instead he settled in New York City, where he opened a French restaurant, "Le Gourmet." Upon the United States entering the war, in 1942 Dreyfus enlisted in the United States Army and served in Europe as an interrogator in the Italian Campaign. After the war, in 1945 he became an American citizen and brought his brother Maurice back to New York, where they opened another French restaurant, "Le Chanteclair." This soon became the semi-official New York meeting spot for the world's automobile racing community, the rivalries of the past having been overcome by the spirit of fraternity. It continues today as the Madison Avenue Sports Car Driving and Chowder Society, officially founded in March 1957 and which meets monthly at Sardi's in NYC.

== Motorsports career results ==
=== Notable victories ===
- Belgian Grand Prix: 1934
- Cork Grand Prix (Cork International Road Race): 1938
- Grand Prix de Brignoles: 1931
- Grand Prix de Dieppe: 1929, 1935
- Circuit d'Esterel Plage 1930
- Grand Prix de la Marne: 1930, 1935
- Pau Grand Prix: 1938
- Monaco Grand Prix: 1930

=== European Championship results ===
(key) (Races in bold indicate pole position) (Races in italics indicate fastest lap)

Year	Entrant	Chassis	Engine	1	2	3	4	5	6	7	EDC	Pts
1931	Officine A. Maserati	Maserati 26M	Maserati 2.5 L8	ITA	FRA; 8	BEL					15th	20
1932	R. Dreyfus	Bugatti T51	Bugatti 2.3 L8	ITA; 5	FRA; 5	GER; 4					4th	12
1935	Scuderia Ferrari	Alfa Romeo Tipo B/P3	Alfa Romeo 3.2 L8	MON; 2	FRA	BEL; 4	GER; DNS	SUI; 7			5th	36
1935	Scuderia Ferrari	Alfa Romeo 8C-35	Alfa Romeo 3.8 L8						ITA; 2	ESP	5th	36
1936	Scuderia Ferrari	Alfa Romeo Tipo C	Alfa Romeo	MON	GER; Ret						10th	24
1936	Scuderia Ferrari	Alfa Romeo 12C 1936	Alfa Romeo 4.1 V12			SUI; Ret	ITA; 4				10th	24
1938	Ecurie Bleue Delahaye	Delahaye 145	Delahaye 4.5 V12	FRA	GER; 5	SUI; 8	ITA				9th	24
1939	Ecurie Lucy O'Reilly Schell	Delahaye 145	Delahaye 4.5 V12	BEL	FRA; 7	GER; 4					6th	20
1939	Ecurie Lucy O'Reilly Schell	Maserati 8CTF	Maserati 3.0 L8				SUI; 8				6th	20

=== 24 Hours of Le Mans results ===
Year	Team	Co-Drivers	Car	Class	Laps	Pos.	Class Pos.
1937	(France) Ecurie Bleue	(France) Henri Stoffel	Delahaye 135CS	5.0	231	**3rd**	**3rd**
1938	(France) Ecurie Bleue	(Monaco) Louis Chiron	Delahaye 145	5.0	21	DNF	DNF
1952	(United States) Luigi Chinetti	(France) Pierre-Louis Dreyfus	Ferrari 340 America Spyder	S 5.0		DNF	DNF
