= Delahaye 145 =

Delahaye 145/155/165
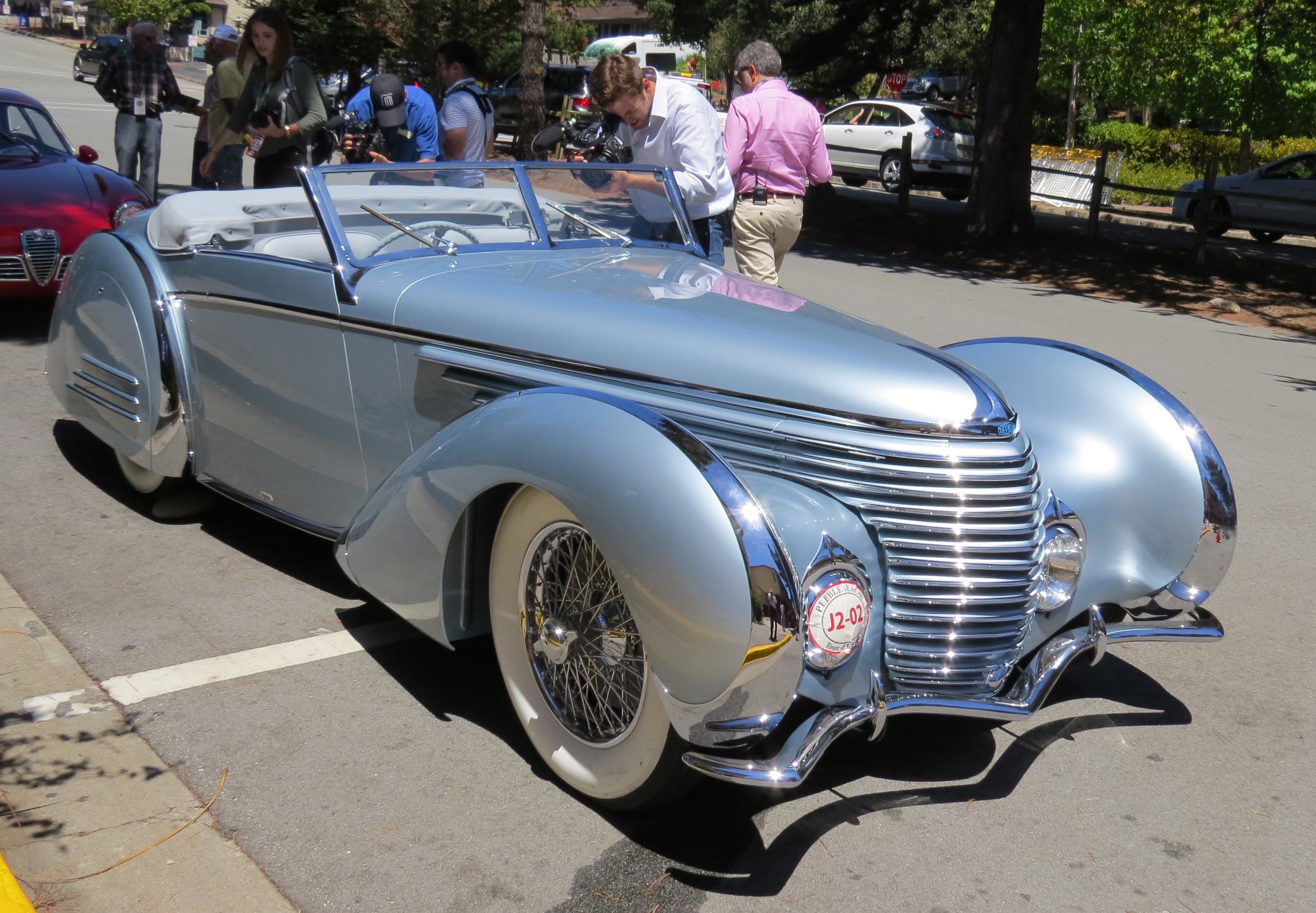
- Delahaye 145 Cabriolet by Franay

Overview
- Manufacturer: Delahaye

Body and chassis
- Class: Luxury car
- Layout: FR layout
- Related: Delahaye 134; Delahaye 135; Delahaye 175

Powertrain
- Engine: 4,496 cc V-12, 225 hp (168 kW)
- Transmission: 4-speed manual 4-speed pre-selector

Dimensions
- Wheelbase: 2,700 mm (106 in)
- Curb weight: 989 kg (2,180 lb) (chassis)

The Delahaye 145 is a luxury car, derived from a racecar design, manufactured by French automaker Delahaye. Based on a sporting tourer, it was designed to be capable for racing.

== History ==
Only four 4.5 litre naturally aspirated V12 Type 145 racecars were built, all exclusively for Lucy O'Reilly Schell and her Écurie Bleue racing team. These were build numbers 48771, 48772, 48773, and 48775. The missing chassis number in the sequence, 48774, was the only Type 155 built — a grandprix monoposto fitted with an experimental De Dion tube independent rear suspension system and innovative geared hubs.

All five of the V12 engined chassis were based on the 2.70 m (106 in) wheelbase Type 135SC. The only difference in the Type 145 was a pair of short rear suspension trailing arms that were supposed to improve handling. The chassis of the Type 155 was an original one-off that used only the Type 135's proprietary independent front suspension that Delahaye shared with Delage and Talbot.

Despite two early wins by Type 145 number 48771, the five V12s were less than successful, and by 1939 all five racecars had been consigned by owner O'Reilly Schell to the Wilson Garage's proprietor, Fernand Lacour, to sell.

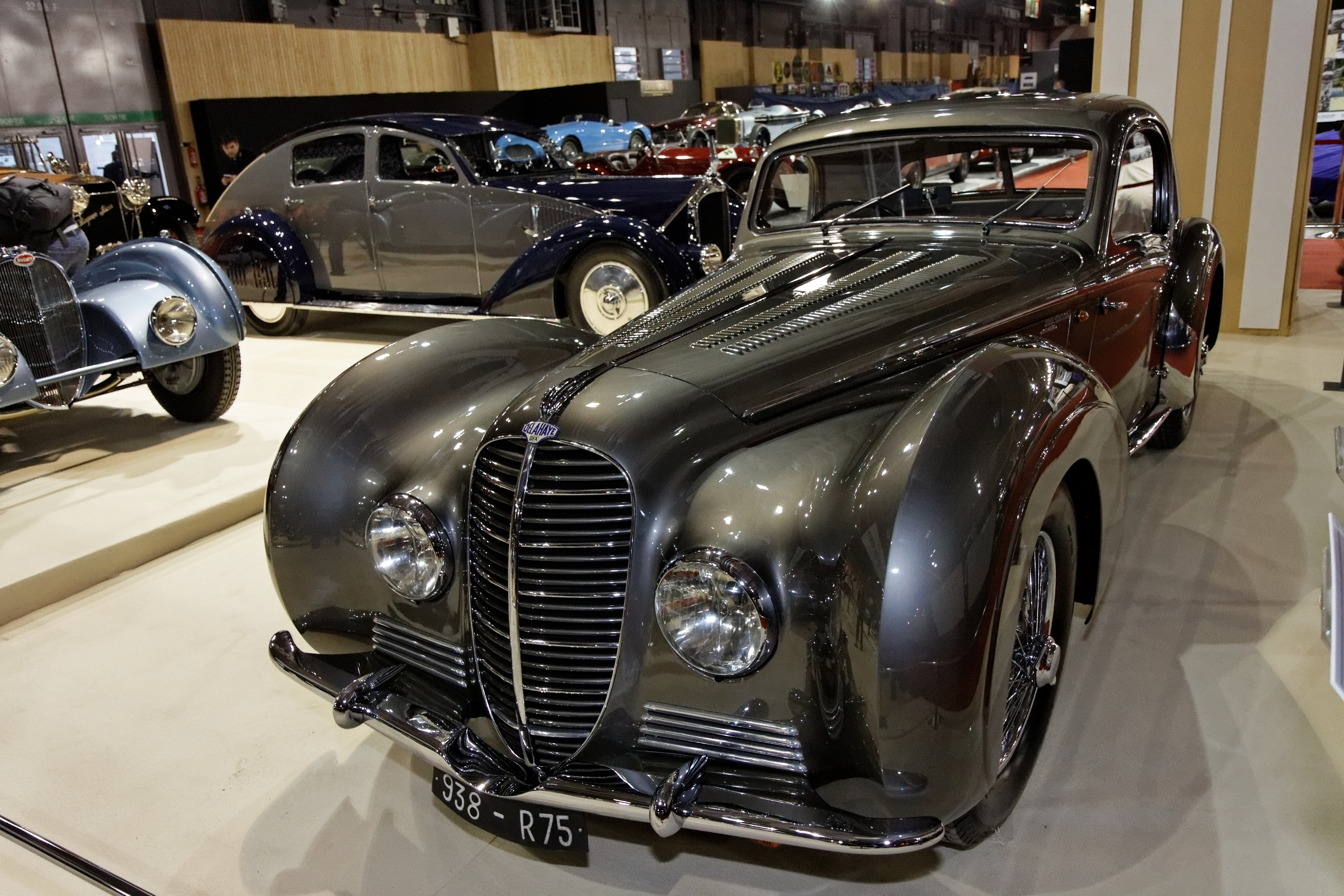
1938 Delahaye Type 145 Coupe by Chapron

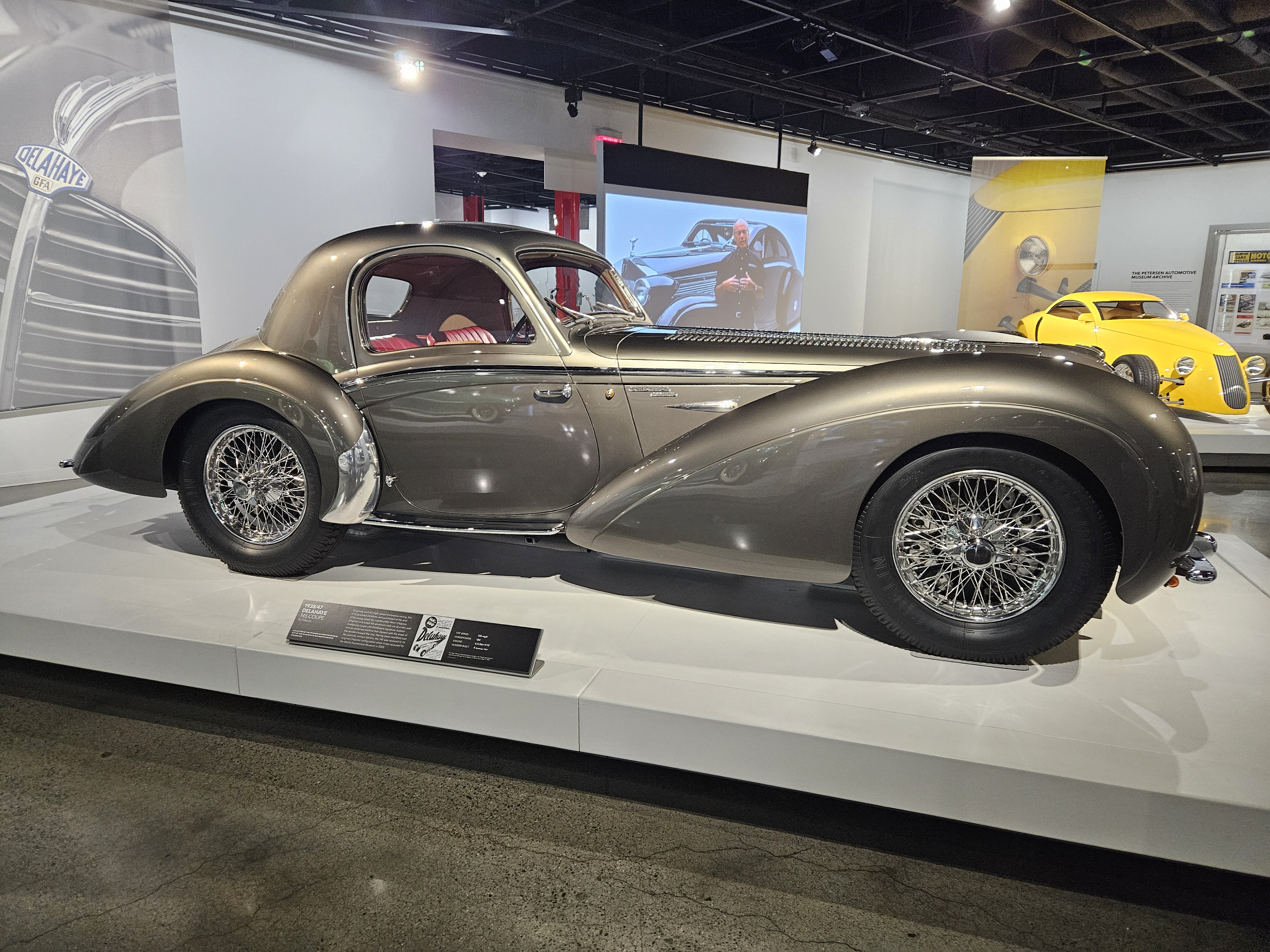
1938 Delahaye Type 145 Coupe by Chapron

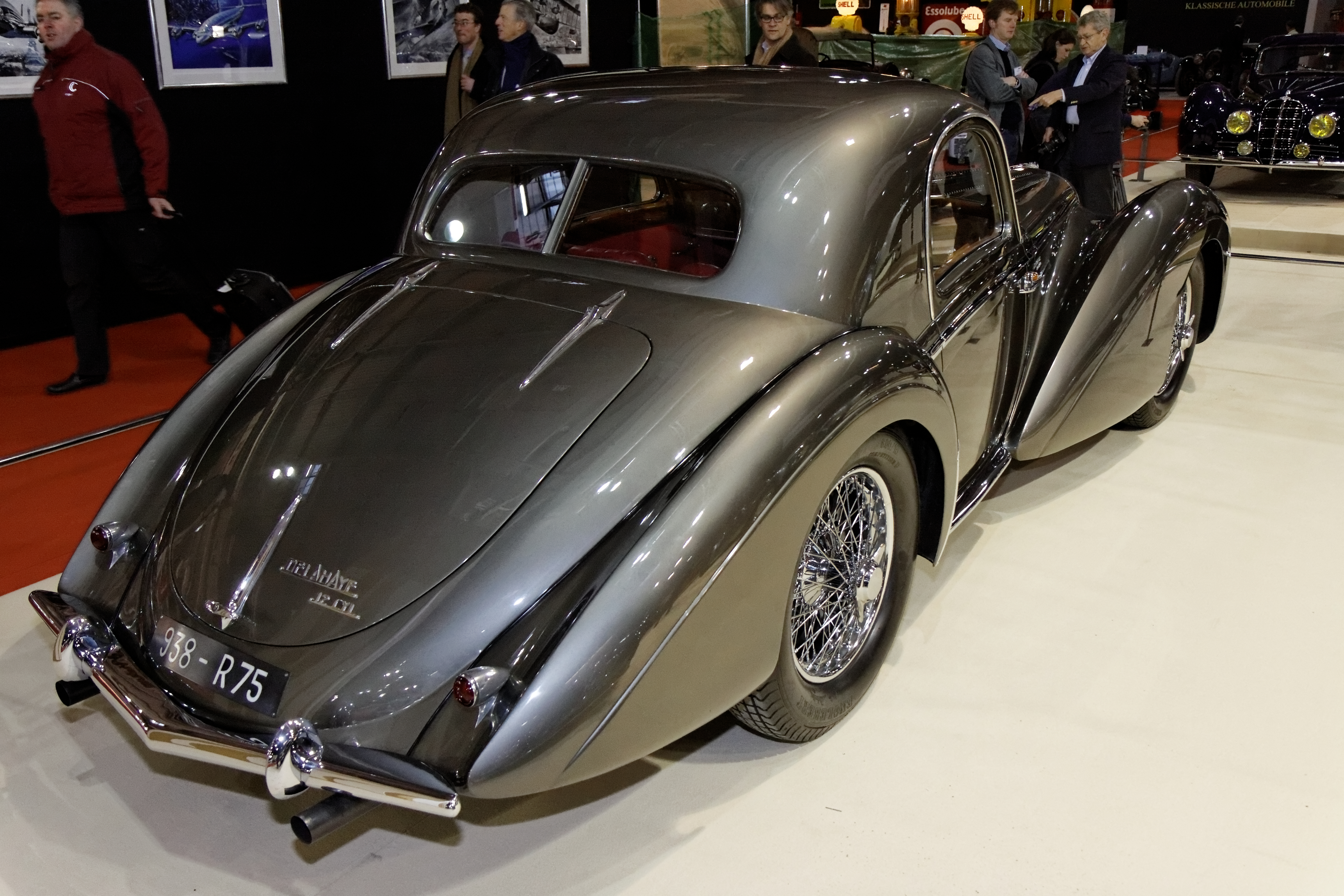
1938 Delahaye Type 145 Coupe by Chapron

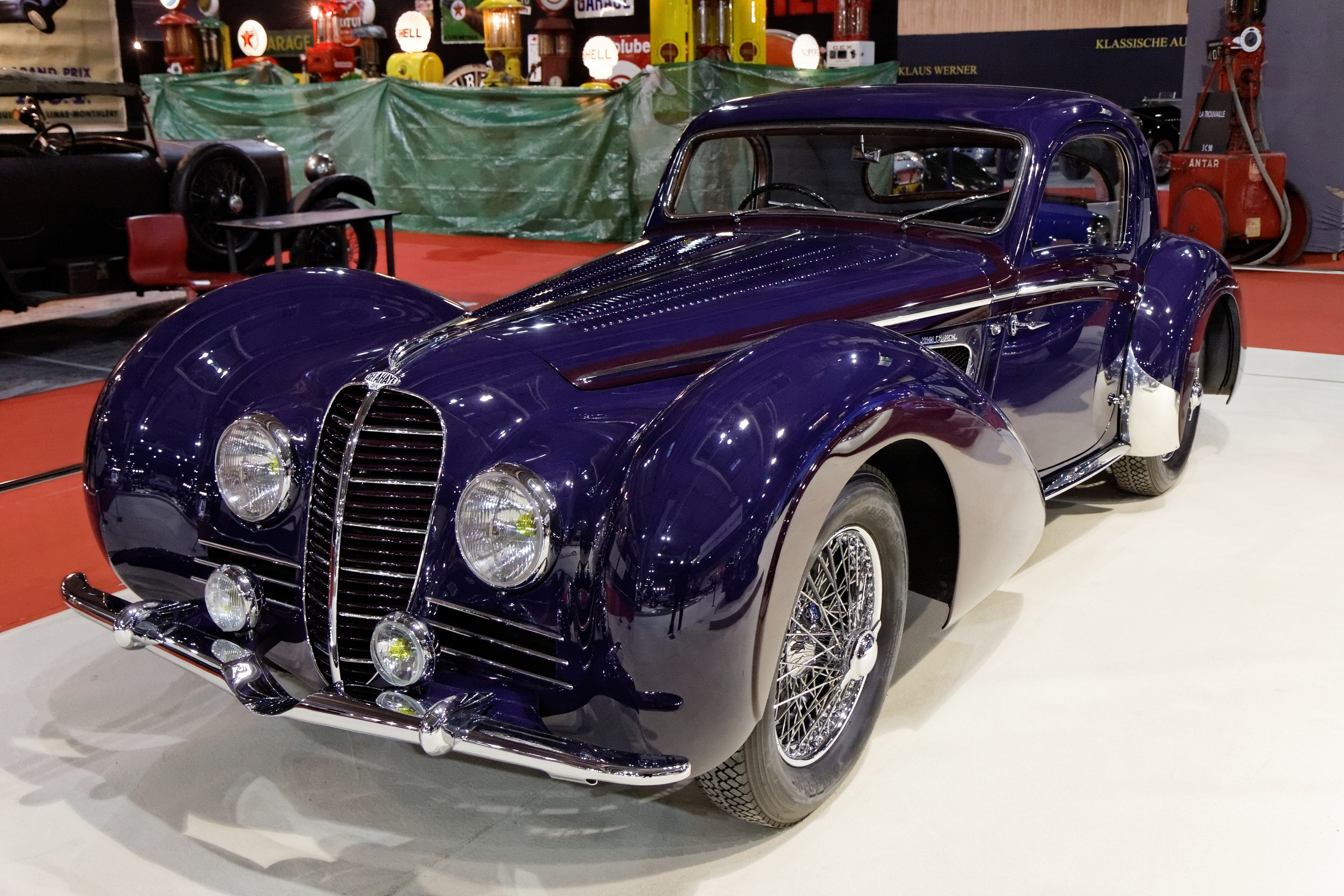
1938 Delahaye type 145 Coupe by Chapron

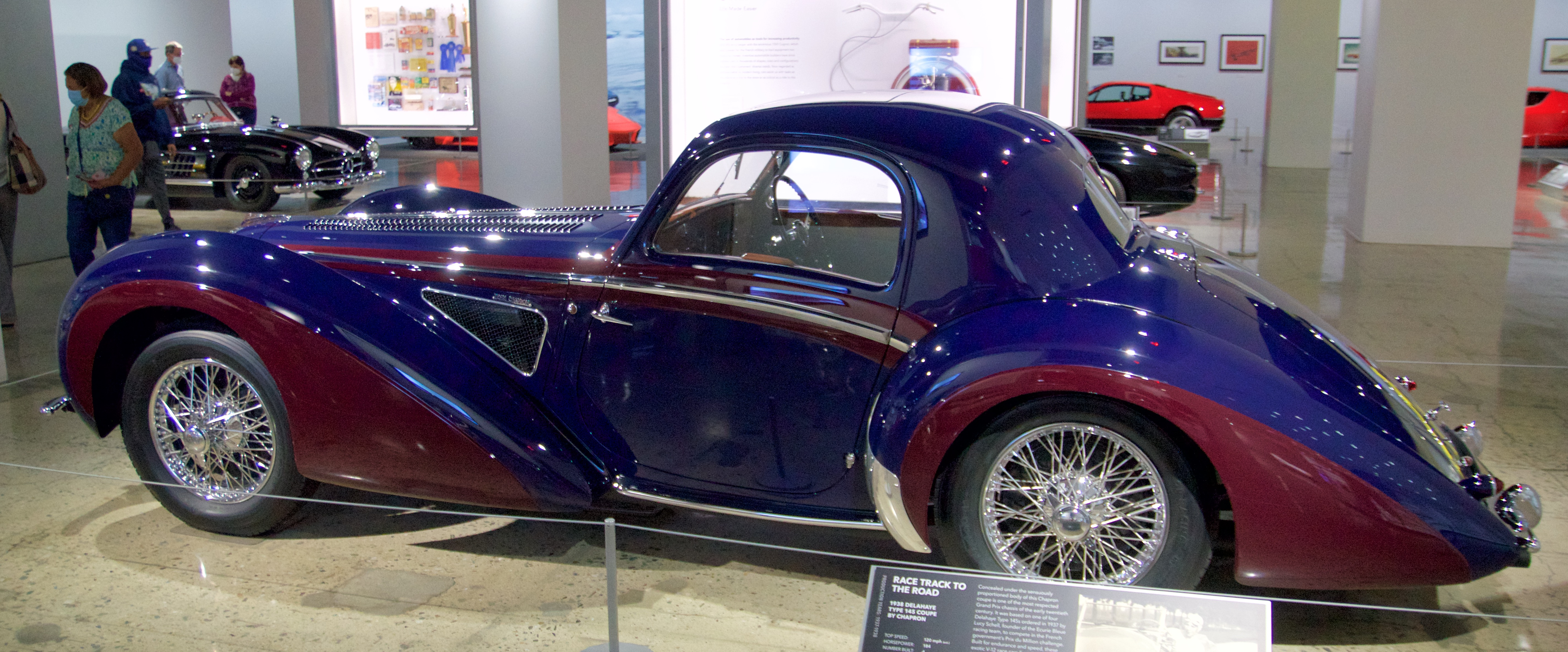
1938 Delahaye type 145 Coupe by Chapron

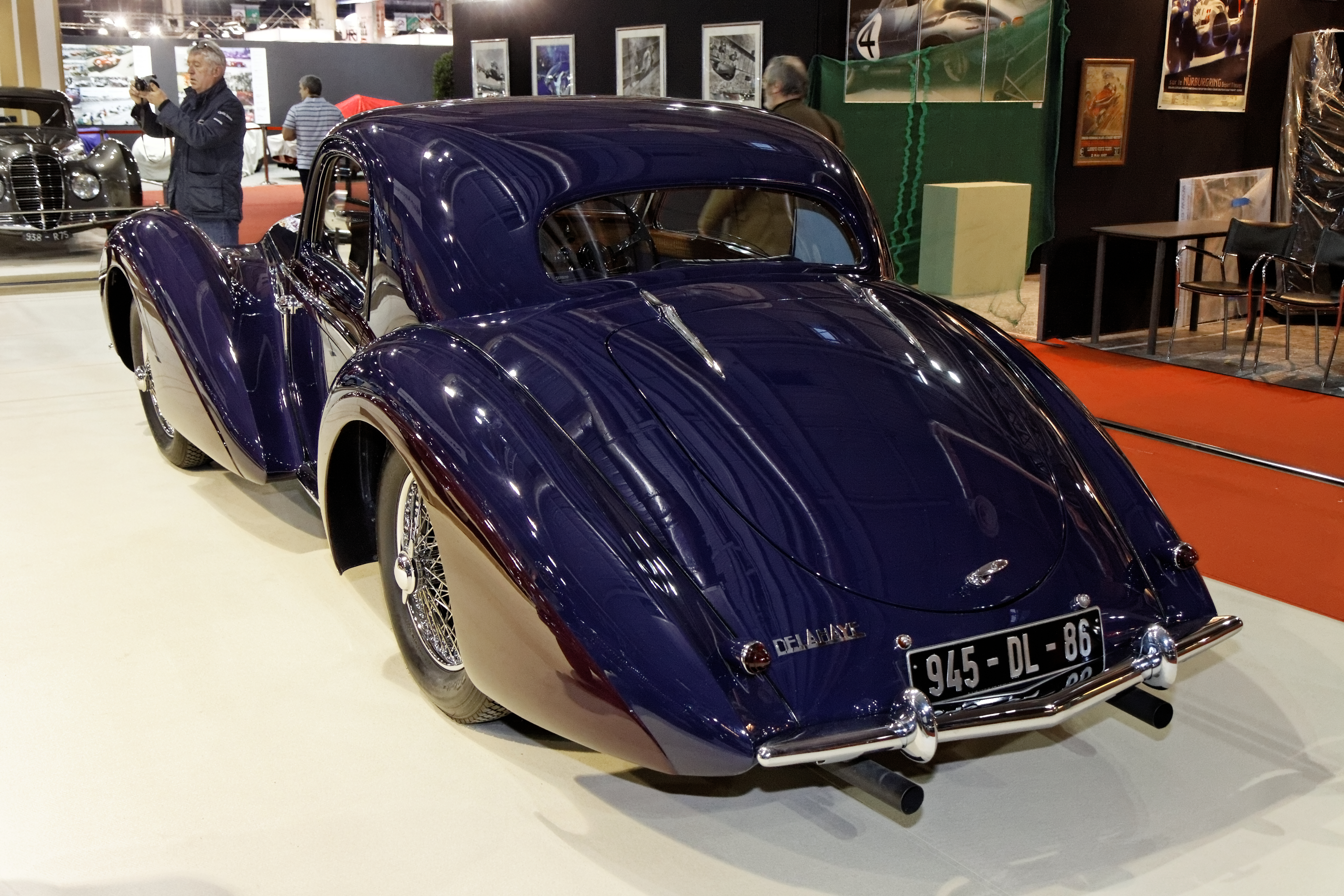
1938 Delahaye type 145 Coupe by Chapron

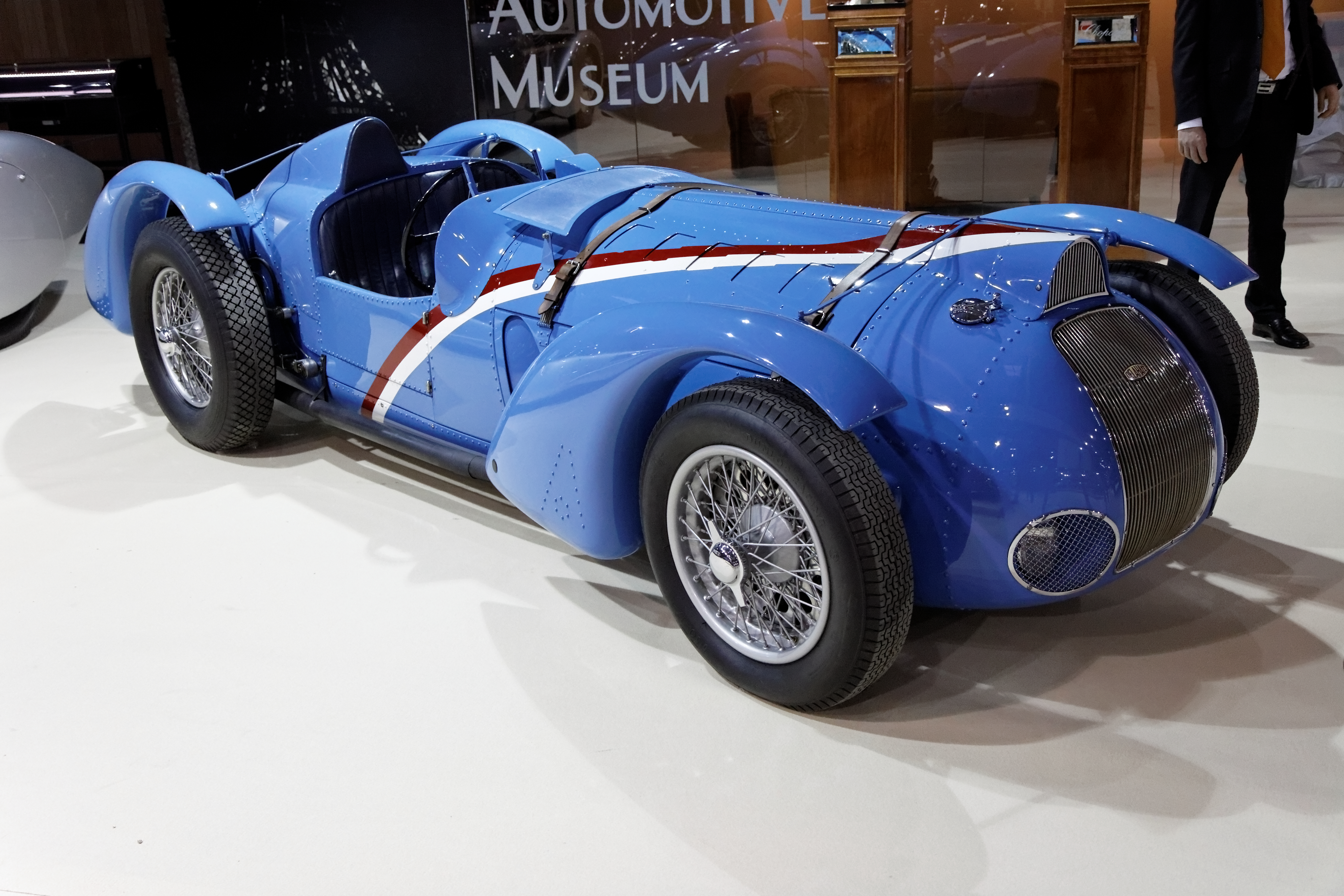
1937 Grand Prix Delahaye V12 type 145

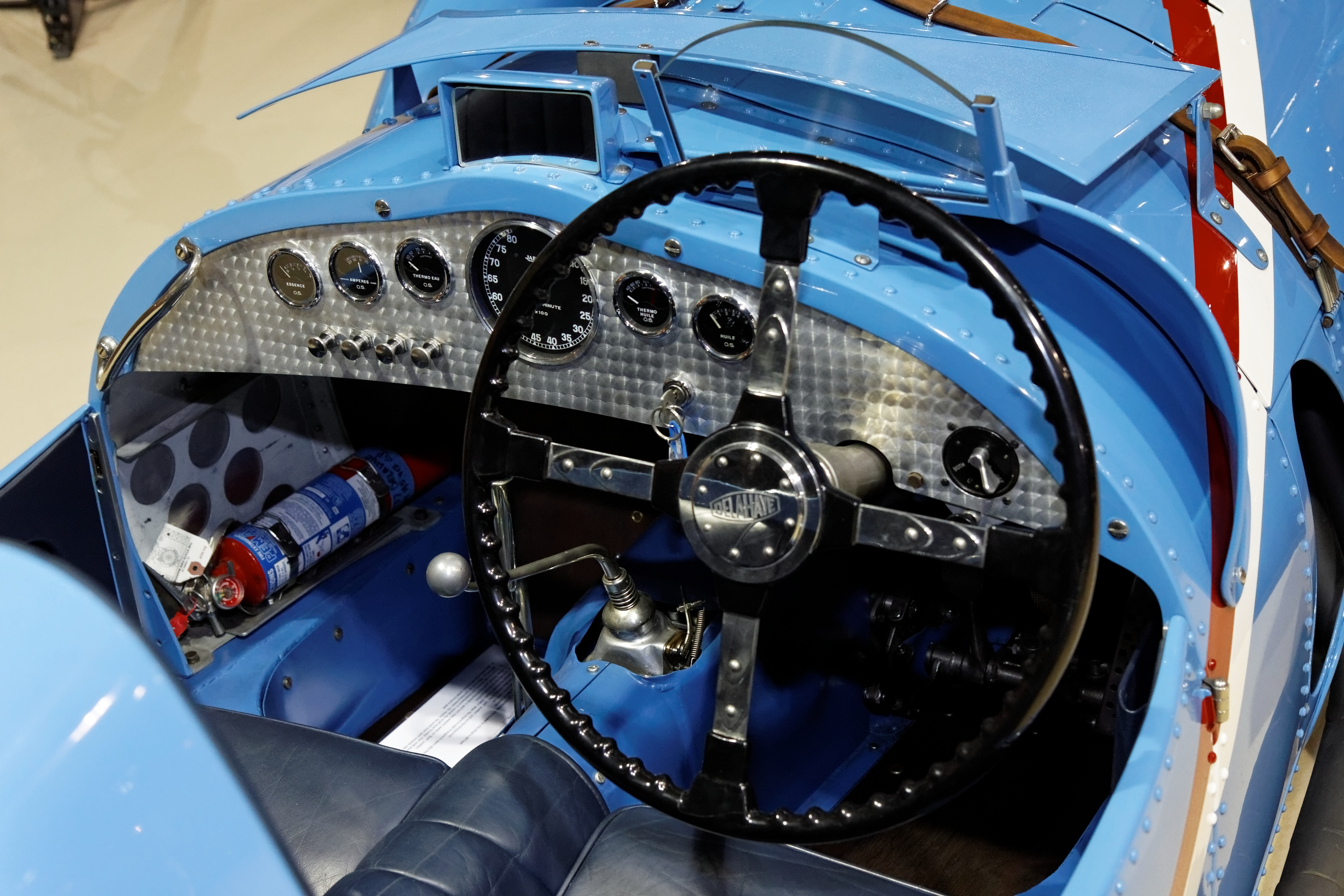
1937 Grand Prix Delahaye V12 type 145

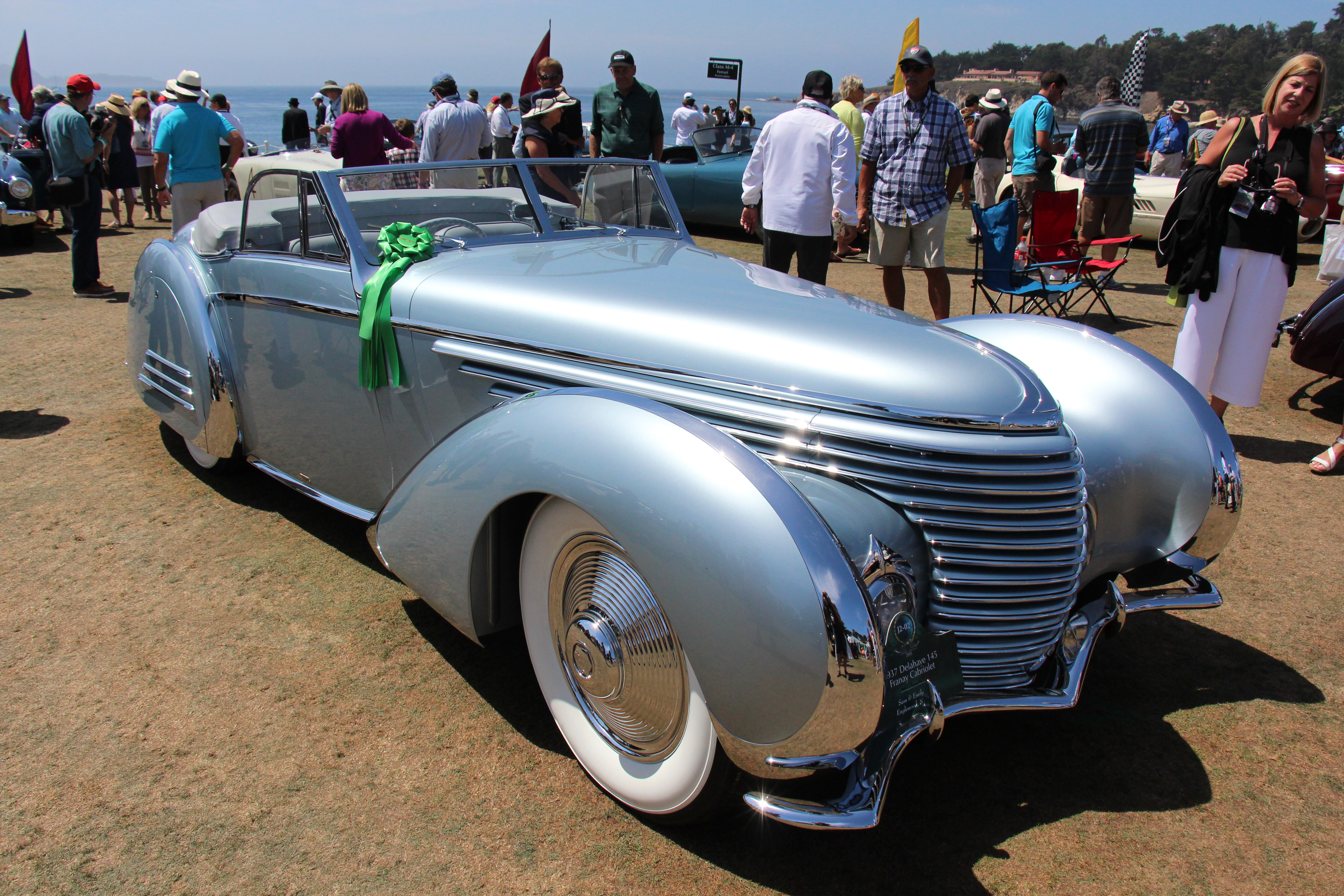
1937 Delahaye Type 145 Franay cabriolet (chassis 48 772/3)

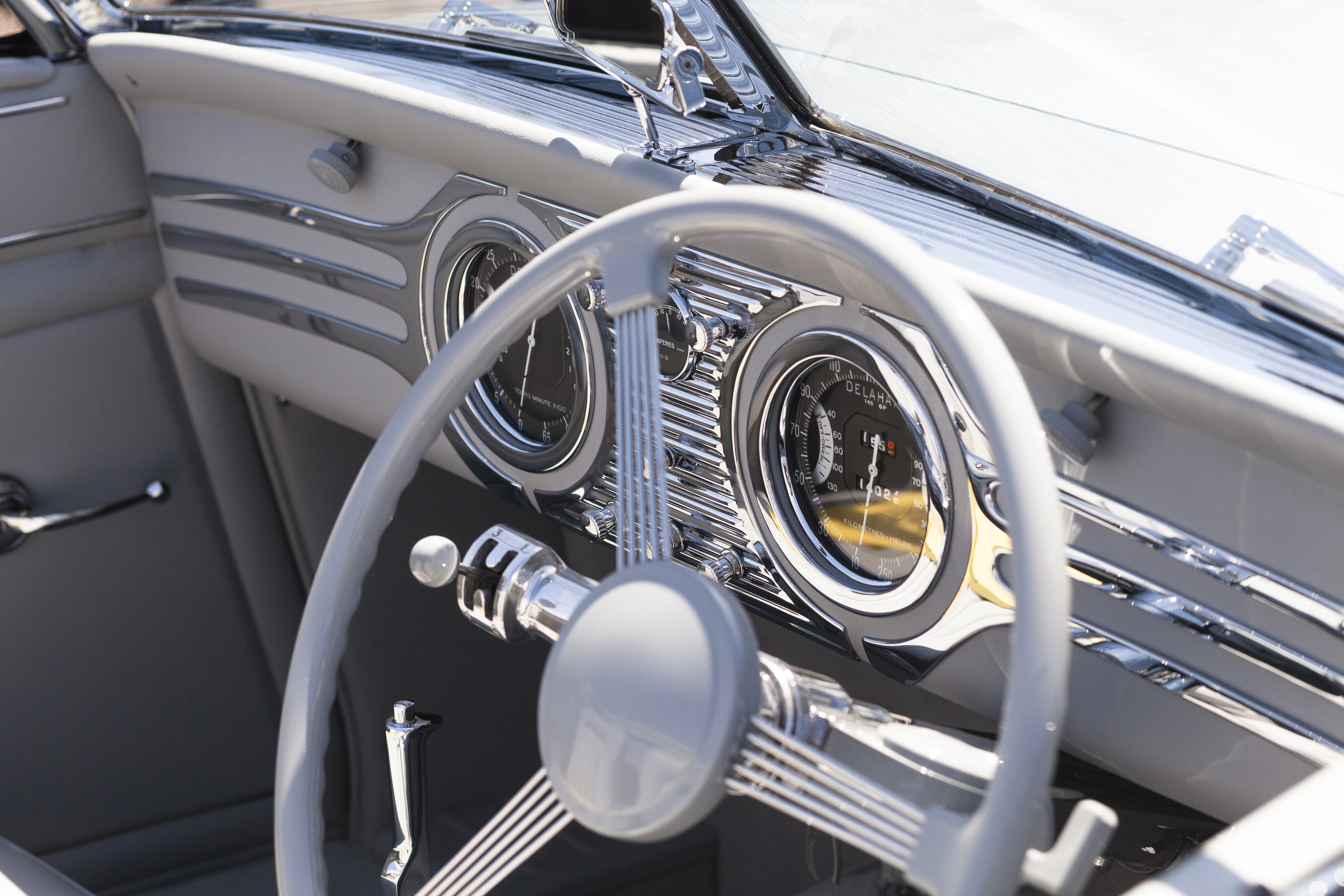
1937 Delahaye Type 145 Franay cabriolet (chassis 48 772/3)

=== Type 165 ===
From the twelve sets of V12 engine parts, Delahaye built five bodied racecars for O'Reilly Schell, and four coachbuilt grand-touring Type 165 chassis. These were stamped as build numbers 4071 (chassis 60741), 4072 (chassis 60742), 4073 (chassis 60743), and 4074 (chassis 60744). The first two were bodied by Henri Chapron, one as a Dandy Series cabriolet, the other as an enclosed coach. The other two (60743 and 60744) were bodied as streamlined avant garde roadsters by Joseph Figoni of Figoni et Falaschi. Only the latter two survive. Both Chapron cars were bombed into oblivion during World War II.

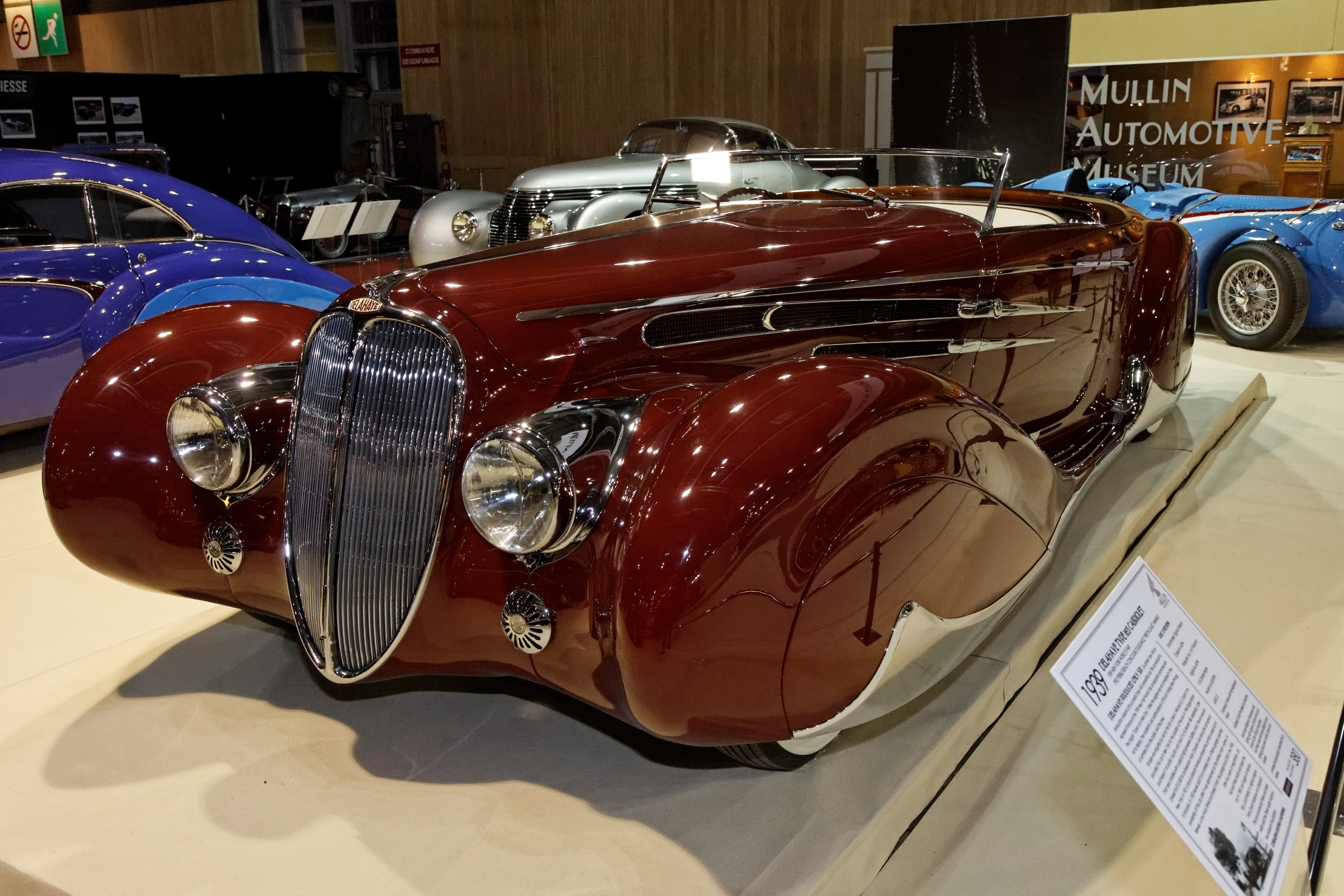
1939 Delahaye Type 165 Cabriolet by Figoni et Falaschi

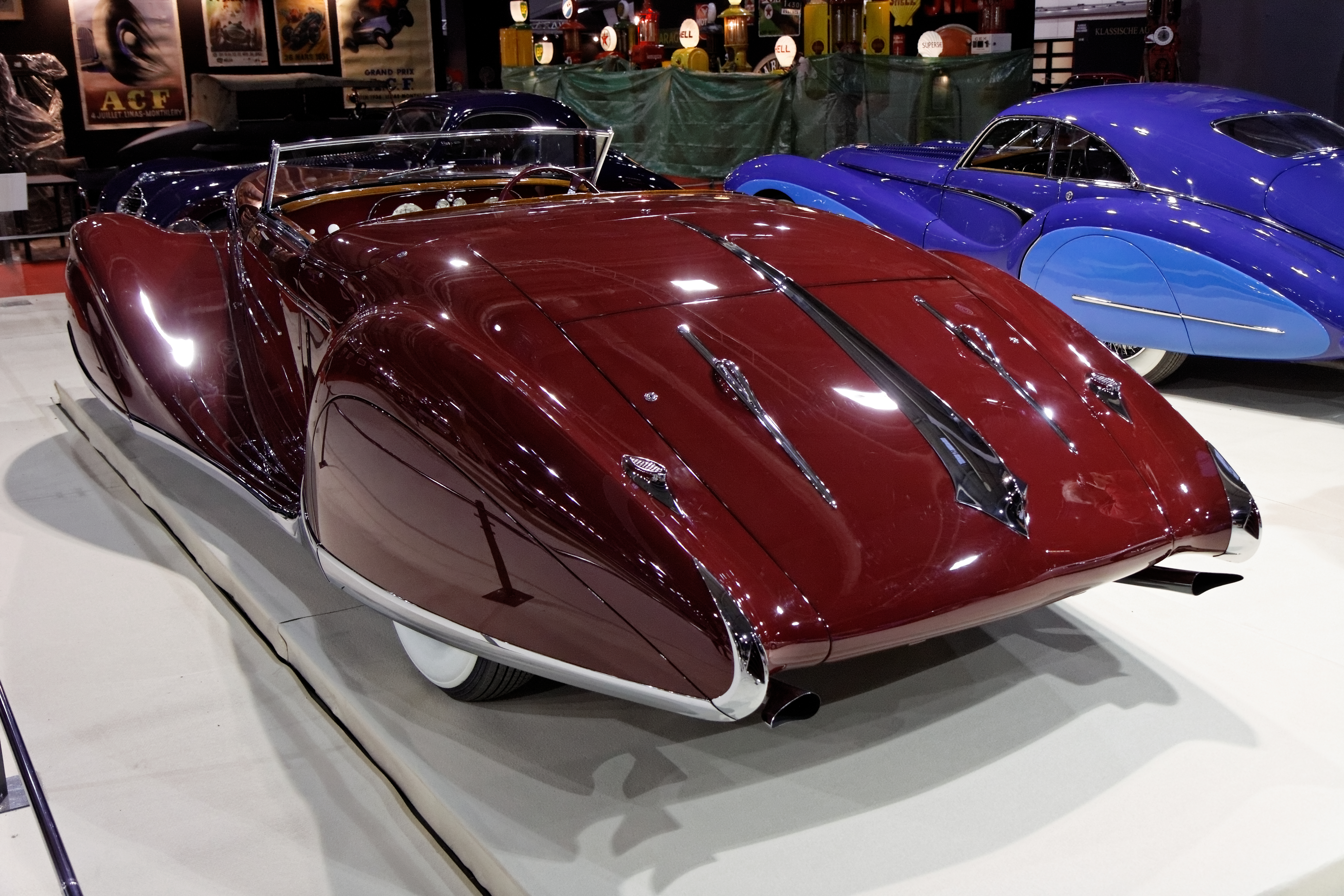
1939 Delahaye Type 165 Cabriolet by Figoni et Falaschi

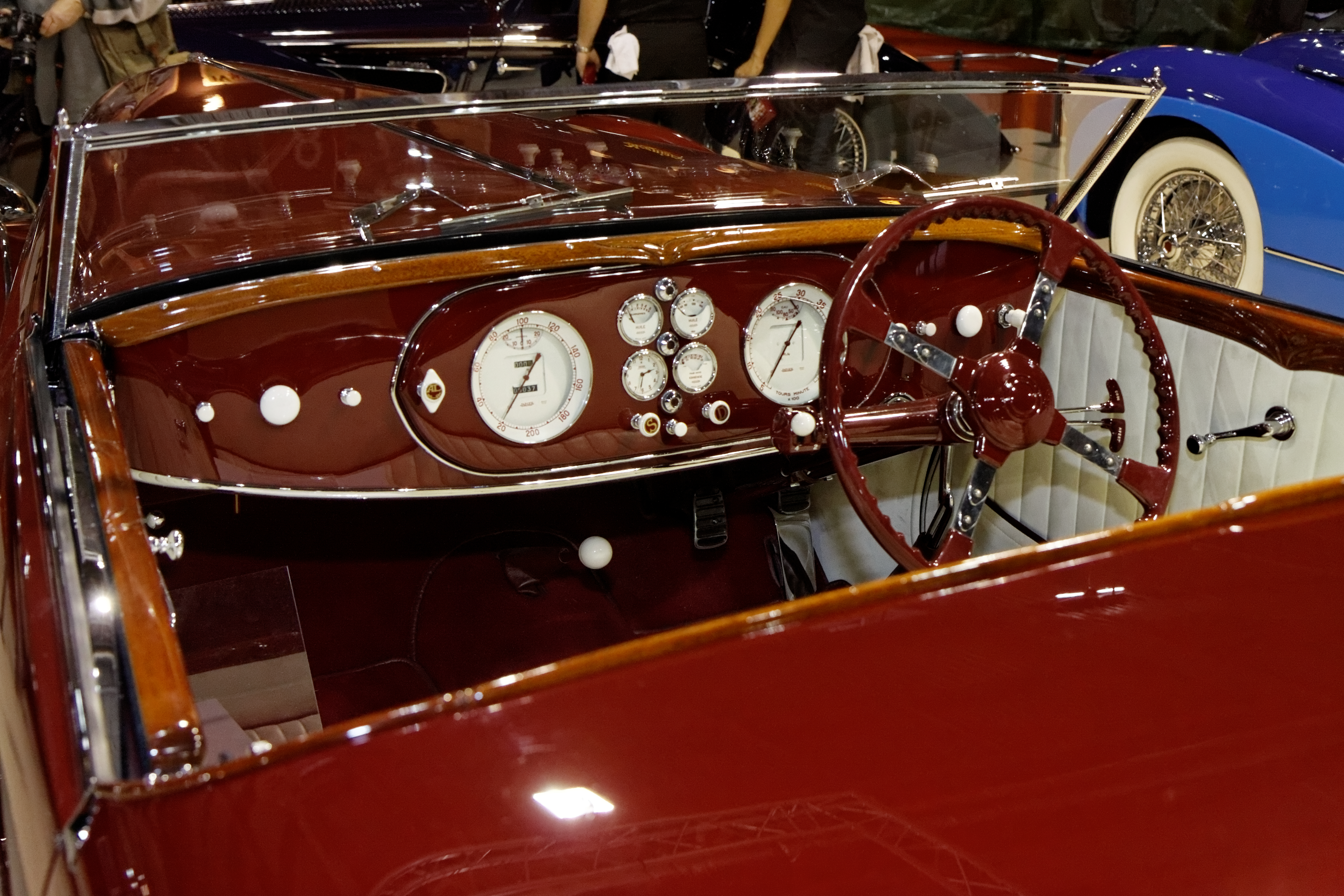
1939 Delahaye Type 165 Cabriolet by Figoni et Falaschi

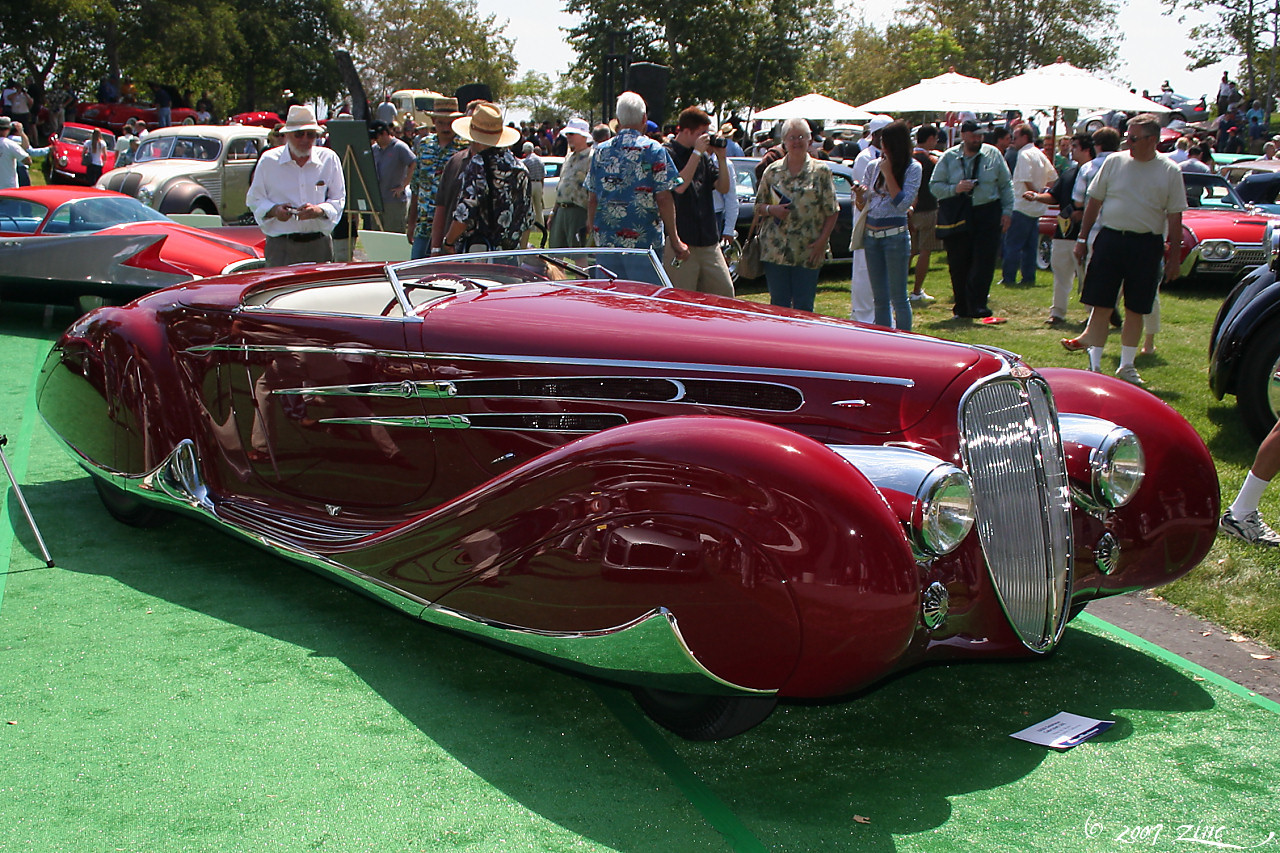
1939 Delahaye Type 165 Cabriolet by Figoni et Falaschi

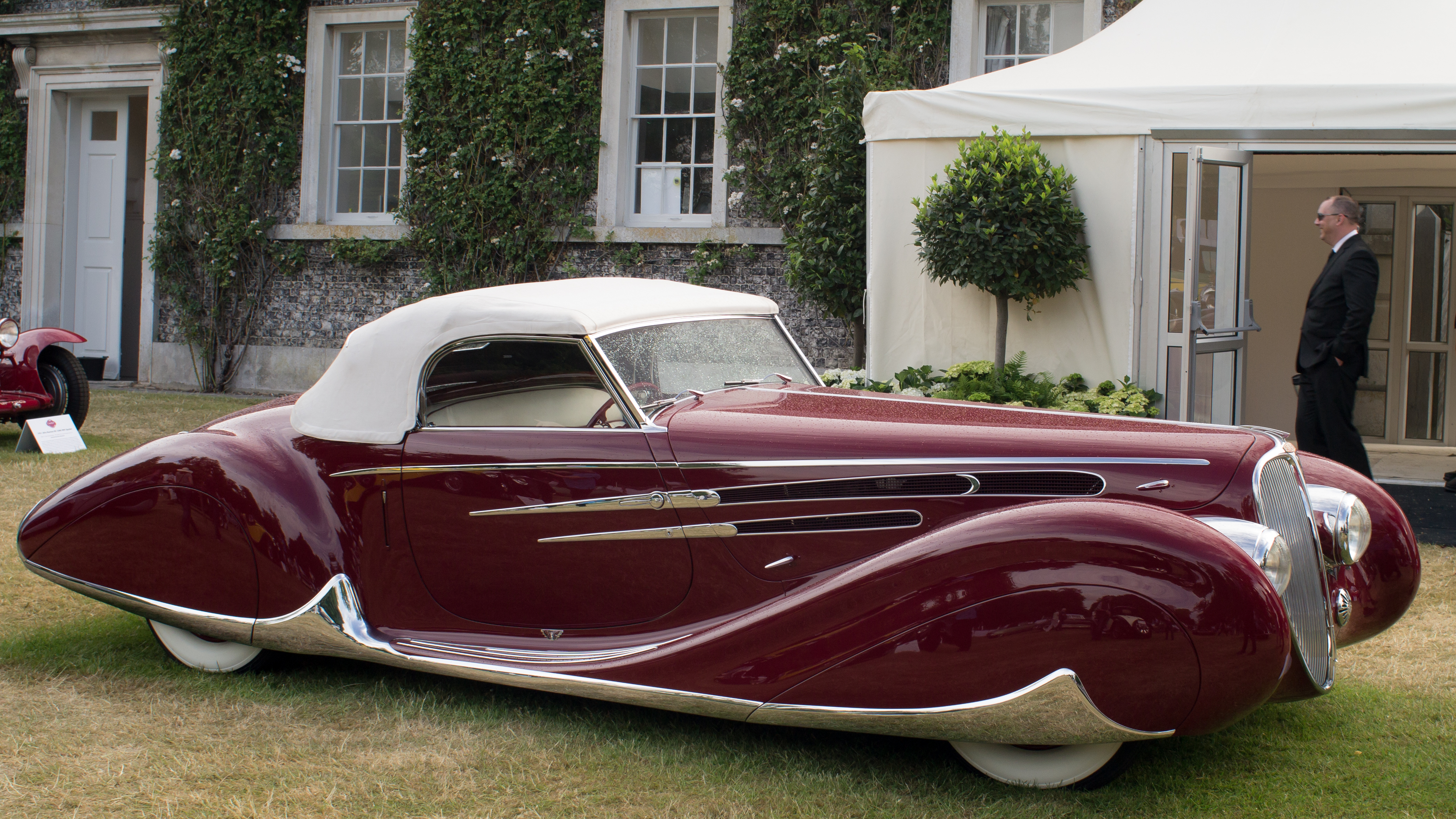
1939 Delahaye Type 165 Cabriolet by Figoni et Falaschi

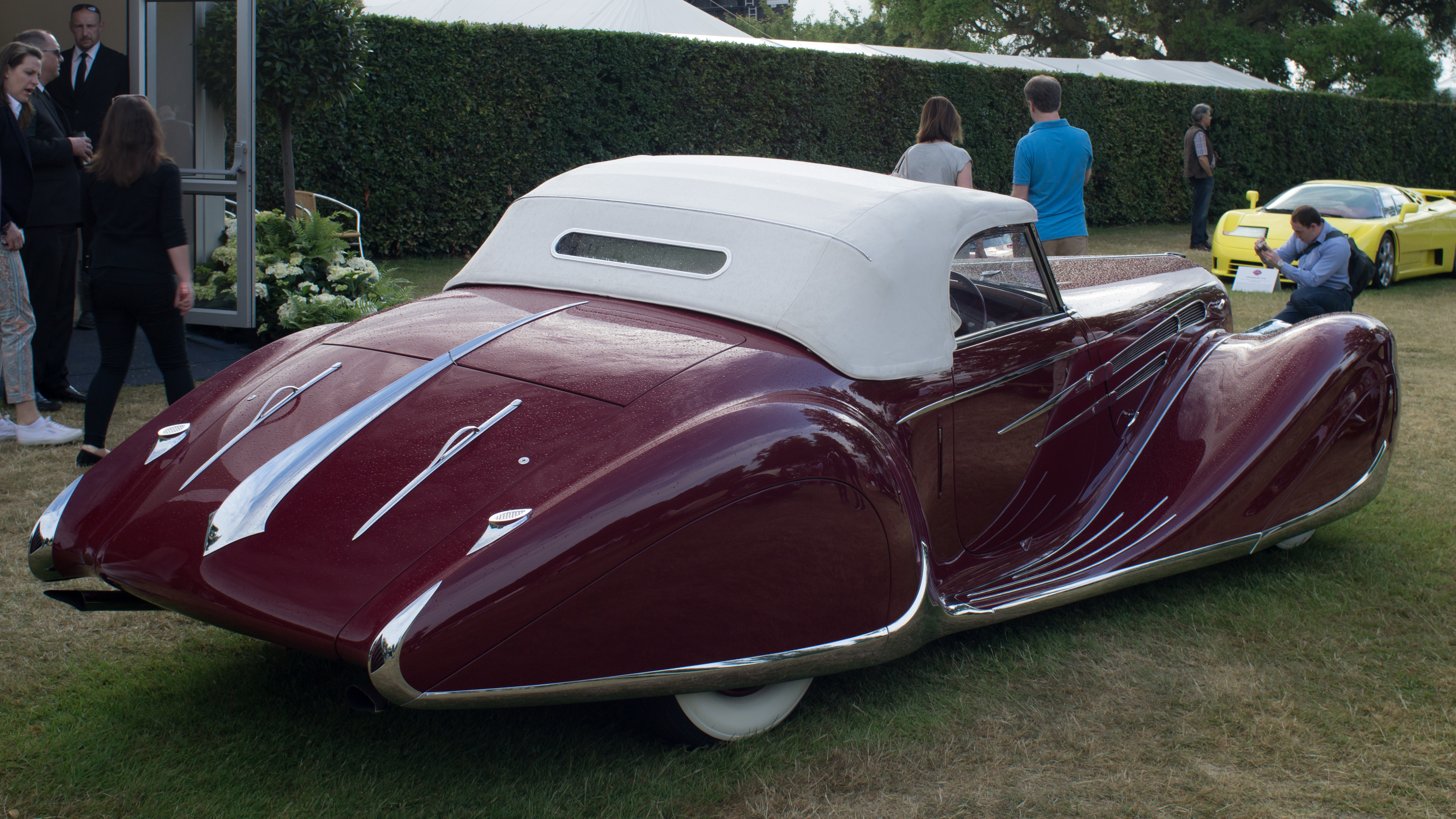
1939 Delahaye Type 165 Cabriolet by Figoni et Falaschi

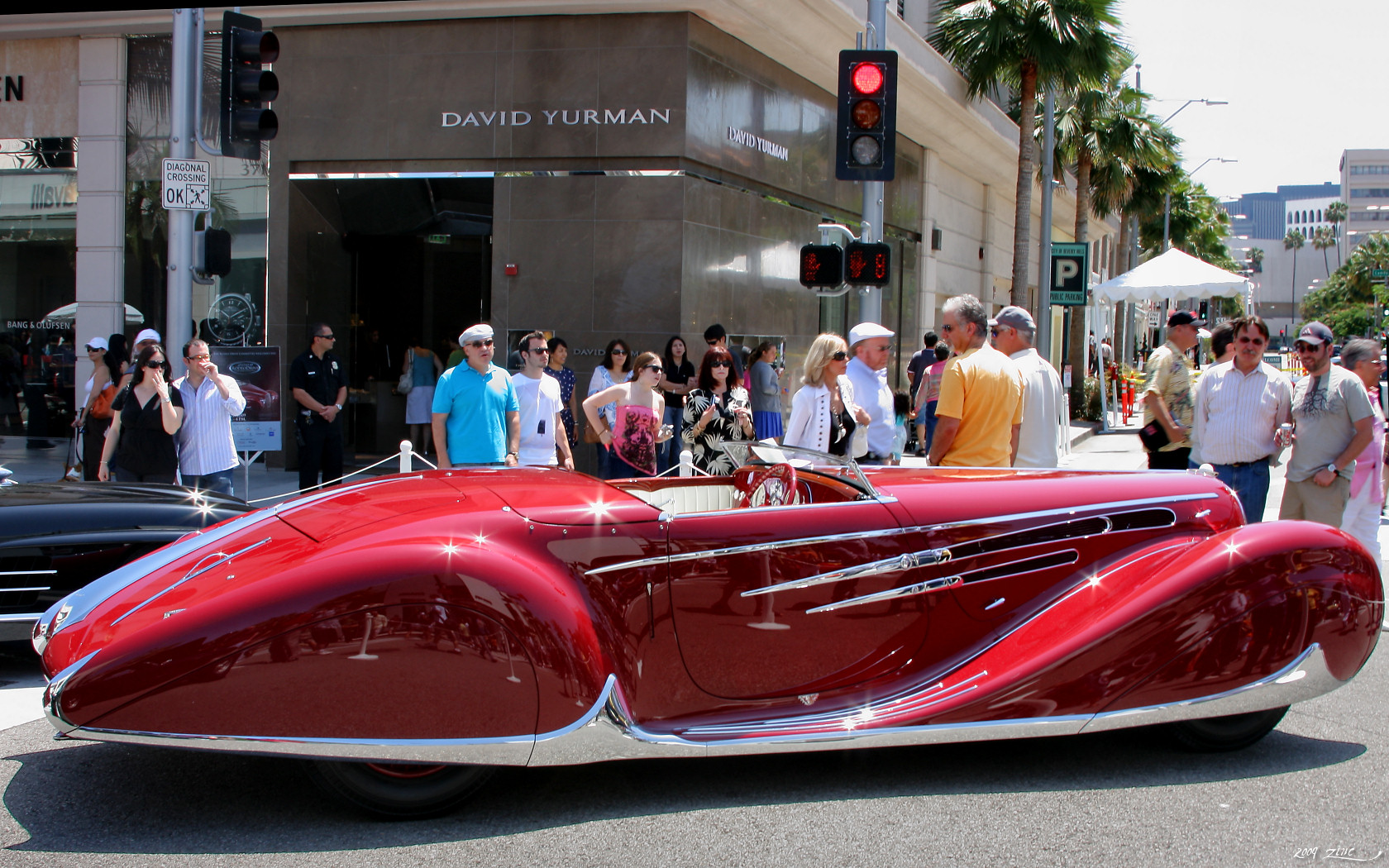
1939 Delahaye Type 165 Cabriolet by Figoni et Falaschi
