= 1000 km of Paris =

Map of the entire autodrome de Linas-Montlhéry.

The 1000 Kilometres of Paris was an endurance race, mainly for sports cars, which was held at the Autodrome de Linas-Montlhéry in France from 1956 to 1995.

== 1956 ==
The event is called Grand Prix of the Automobile Club of Île-de-France. Following the accident of the 24 Hours of Le Mans 1955 and the measures taken by the public authorities, the safety conditions of the Linas-Montlhéry autodrome were improved; in particular 34 stands, with access to refueling, were built. A Maserati 300S win at the average speed of 150.239 km/h. A Gordini T15S finished in eighth place, a DB Panhard at the thirteenth, a Ferry powered by Renault at the fourteenth and a Vernet-Pairard — also powered by Renault — at the sixteenth. The three Panhard Monopoles did not finish.

== 1962 ==
The race became part of the World Sportscar Championship. René Bonnet and Charles Deutsch each line up a 1000 cm3 prototype powered by Renault and Panhard. The domination of the Ferrari 250 GTO was unchallenged in the first six places: Pedro and Ricardo Rodriguez win another victory at 157,727 km/h average.

== 1995 ==
The race was interrupted after 540 km. The four Ferrari F40s entered in the Group GT1 were broken, as was the McLaren F1 GTR; only a Venturi 600 LM had saved the GT1's honor by finishing in fourth place.

== Winners ==
Year	Driver 1	Driver 2	Team	Car	Time
1956	(France) Jean Behra	(France) Louis Rosier	Private	Maserati 300S	6 h 41 min 03 s 100
1957–1959	No race				
1960	(Belgium) Olivier Gendebien	(Belgium) Lucien Bianchi	Ecurie Francorchamps	Ferrari 250 GT SWB	6 h 54 min 46 s 800
1961	(Mexico) Pedro Rodríguez	(Mexico) Ricardo Rodríguez	North American Racing Team	Ferrari 250 GT SWB	6 h 32 min 15 s 200
1962	(Mexico) Pedro Rodríguez	(Mexico) Ricardo Rodríguez	North American Racing Team	Ferrari 250 GTO.	6 h 21 min 58 s 700
1963	No race				
1964	(Sweden) Joakim Bonnier	(United Kingdom) Graham Hill	Maranello Concessionaires	Ferrari 330 P	6 h 32 min 53 s 100
1965	No race				
1966	(United Kingdom) Mike Parkes	(United Kingdom) David Piper	Private	Ferrari 250 LM	6 h 31 min 24 s 000
1967	(Belgium) Jacky Ickx	(Australia) Paul Hawkins	J.W. Automotive	Mirage M1 Ford.	7 h 18 min 19 s 800
1968	(Germany) Rolf Stommelen	(Germany) Hans Herrmann	Porsche System	Porsche 908.	6 h 12 min 20 s 100
1969	(France) Jean-Pierre Beltoise	(France) Henri Pescarolo	Équipe Matra - Elf	Matra-Simca MS650.	3 h 27 min 23 s 000
1970	(Australia) Jack Brabham	(France) François Cevert	Matra Sports	Matra-Simca MS660.	5 h 49 min 41 s 800
1971	(United Kingdom) Derek Bell	(Netherlands) Gijs van Lennep	J.W. Automotive	Porsche 917	6 h 14 min 22 s 800
1972	(France) Jean-Pierre Beltoise	(France) Gérard Larrousse	Écurie Bonnier	Lola T280-2	6 h 04 min 24 s 920
1973–1993	No race				
1994	(France) Henri Pescarolo	(France) Jean-Claude Basso	JCB Racing	Venturi 600 LM	7 h 36 min 48 s 740
1995	(Germany) Stefan Oberndorfer	(Germany) Detlef Hübner	Muhlbauer Motorsport	Porsche 911 GT2	4 h 00 min 53 s 560

- Note: The 1972 race was held at Rouen-Les-Essarts.

== Endurance racing in Paris before 1956 ==
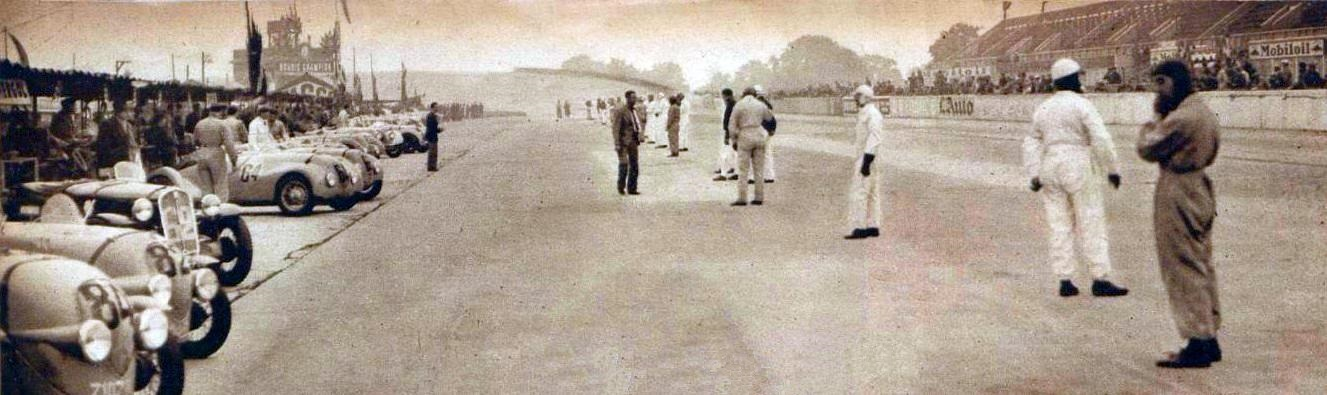
Start of the 1938 12 hours of Paris at Montlhéry.

Prior to 1956 other races were held at Montlhéry for touring cars. These included:

Grand Prix Tourisme of the AC.F.

- 1925 (1000 kilometers of Paris) — won by André Boillot in a Peugeot 18CV ahead of Pierre Gaudermen, covering nearly 1,050 km (652.4 mi) in less than 12 hours 13 minutes.

24 Hours of Paris

- 1927 — George Duller and Frank Clement led from start to finish in a Bentley 4½ Litre.
- 1955 — Auguste Veuillet and Gonzague Olivier, in a 1.1 L Porsche 550 Spyder.

8 Hours of Montlhéry

- 1934 — Charles Balester won this unique edition.

12 Hours of Paris

- 1938 — René Le Bègue and André Morel, in a Talbot Lago T26 for the first Olazur Cup.
- 1939 — Ten days before the scheduled race date Germany invades Poland, starting the Second World War. Race is cancelled.
- 1947 — Guy Mairesse, in a Delahaye 135.
- 1948 — Luigi Chinetti, in a Ferrari 166 Spyder Corsa.
- 1950 — Luigi Chinetti and Jean Lucas, in a Ferrari 166 MM.

Grand Prix of the AC.F. (French Grand Prix)

- 1931 French Grand Prix – The Grand Prix was held as a 10 hour endurance race for Grand Prix cars, won by Louis Chiron and Achille Varzi driving a Bugatti.
- 1936 French Grand Prix – The Grand Prix was held as a 1000km race for Sports Cars. Won by Jean-Pierre Wimille and Raymond Sommer driving a Bugatti.
- 1937 French Grand Prix – The Grand Prix was held as a 500km race for Sports Cars. Won by Louis Chiron driving a Talbot.
