= Flins-Les Mureaux =

Motorsport race track in Les Mureaux, France

Flins-Les Mureaux Motor Racing Circuit
- Location: Flins-sur-Seine – Les Mureaux, France
- Coordinates: 48°59′0″N 1°52′30″E
- Length: 4.50 km (2.79 miles)
- Turns: 11

Flins-Les Mureaux was a proposed motorsport race track, to be located in the Seine Valley between Flins-sur-Seine and Les Mureaux (to the northwest of Paris), as a future host for the French Grand Prix, to replace its former home at Magny-Cours.

The final Grand Prix on Magny-Cours was held in 2008, and the race's promoter FFSA was looking for an alternative host. There were six different proposals for a new circuit which included a street circuit located near Disneyland Resort Paris , Versailles, Sarcelles, and finally a new track to build in Flins-Les Mureaux, near the Flins Renault Factory.

Work on the circuit was to be carried out by British company Apex Circuit Design, with plans submitted by a Parisian Architect to include a 1 km straight and seating for 120,000 people. The 112 million euro project was said to have started work immediately, even though F1 Boss Bernie Ecclestone had not given the full green light for the track to host a Grand Prix in 2011.

Plans for the development of the circuit to host Formula One were scrapped on 1 December 2009.
