= SEFAC =

SEFAC may refer to:

- Scuderia Ferrari, whose racing department is more formally known as Ferrari SpA Società Esercizio Fabbriche Automobili e Corse
- S.E.F.A.C., French Grand Prix car from the 1930s
