= Million Franc Race =

The Million Franc Race, or Prix du Million, was an effort in 1937 by the French Popular Front to induce French automobile manufacturers to develop race cars capable of competing with the advanced German Mercedes-Benz and Auto Union Silver Arrows racers of the time, which since 1933 were backed by the German government in a (largely successful) attempt to dominate the Grand Prix sport. Italy entered Alfa Romeo and Maserati.

Bugatti could not keep up in the 1930s, neither did other French brands. A first French public funding initiative after the 1934 French Grand Prix supported the S.E.F.A.C. car which failed at the 1935 French Grand Prix and later.

The prize money was a million francs, and to ensure that the competition tested each car's ultimate limits, rather than just the driver's skill in passing other drivers, the race was a time trial against the clock at the treacherous Autodrome de Montlhéry track, which had taken the life of the great Antonio Ascari.

Each car had to drive sixteen laps (200 kilometres (120 mi)) at an average speed of at least 146 km/h (91 mph) from a standing start. René Dreyfus was hired by Lucy O'Reilly Schell's Écurie Bleue team to drive a Delahaye 145 in testing and in the competition itself in which he risked death by setting a literally-blistering pace, wearing the special Dunlop tires down to the fabric but handily overwhelming all competitors except the Bugatti team. On the last day of the competition, the Bugatti entry, driven by Jean-Pierre Wimille, arrived. After spending most of the day repairing various mechanical problems, the Bugatti took to the track for its run towards sundown, accompanied by Dreyfus in the Delahaye in an attempt to protect his incipient victory. The two drivers pushed each other to incredible speed until the Bugatti once again broke under the strain, ensuring Delahaye the prize.

For the 1938 season, the engine size of Grand Prix cars was limited: 3 liter if supercharged, 4.5 if not. The Delahaye V12 fitted into the latter category, the S.E.F.A.C. in the former. The existing Silver Arrows of Mercedes and Auto Union with twice the engine size were this outlawed, and the German companies had to build smaller models.

The victorious Delahaye 145, known as the "Million Franc Delahaye", was driven by Dreyfus in the April 1938 at the Pau Grand Prix, a tight circuit running through village streets. Due to lower fuel consumption and a race without a pit stop, he could beat the legendary Rudolf Caracciola and his brand new and only later all-conquering 480 hp (358 kW) Mercedes-Benz W154, becoming a national hero in France.

Three Écurie Bleue Delahayes were entered for the 1938 French Grand Prix, but did not start due to a dispute about funding, as the 1938 Fonds de Course had been split among Bugatti and Talbot. Schell moved her team to Monaco.

One story tells us that when the Germans seized control of France during World War II, the "Million Franc Delahaye" was disassembled and hidden by sentimental French patriots to prevent it from falling into German hands, and its later whereabouts became unknown.

However, the fact is that Lucy O'Reilly Schell retained ownership of 48771, and her other four V12 engined race cars. She did not allow any "sentimental patriots" permission to dismantle and hide the car. Instead, she consigned it, and the other V12 racers, with The Wilson Garage's proprietor/owner Fernand Lacour, to be liquidated. Despite 48771 being advertised for sale, in mid 1938, not a single "sentimental patriot" expressed interest in buying it. Lacour secured storage for it in the south of France, near Lucy's new family home in neutral Monaco. The car was sold in 1945 to an unknown Nazi sympathizer, who commissioned Franay to design and build a low-slung attractive roadster body on the old Type 145 chassis. He vanished without paying Franay, who managed to have the car seized. Franay bought it at auction. Since then, two different cars have surfaced with credible claims to be the "Million Franc Delahaye", with two different collectors (Peter Mullin in 1987 for the Mullin Automotive Museum and/or Sam Mann) both claiming the privilege of owning this unique piece of automotive history.

== See also ==
- Delahaye
- Popular Front (France)
