= 1937 French Grand Prix =

Race details
- Date: 4 July 1937
- Official name: XXXI Grand Prix de l'Automobile Club de France
- Location: Montlhéry, France
- Course: Autodrome de Linas-Montlhéry
- Course length: 12.50 km (7.767 miles)
- Distance: 40 laps, 500.0 km (310.7 miles)

Fastest lap
Driver	(Monaco) Louis Chiron	Talbot
- Time: 5:29.7

Podium
First	(Monaco) Louis Chiron	Talbot
Second	(Italy) Gianfranco Comotti	Talbot
Third	(France) Albert Divo	Talbot

The 1937 French Grand Prix (formally the XXXI Grand Prix de l'Automobile Club de France) was a Grand Prix motor race which was held at Montlhéry, France on 4 July 1937. The race was held over 40 laps of the 12.5 km course for a total distance of 500 km. The race was won by Louis Chiron driving a Talbot. Similar to the 1936 race this year was run for sports cars. However, in order to help French manufacturers prepare for the new 1938 Grand Prix regulations, a 4.5L maximum engine capacity was imposed.

== Classification ==
Pos	No	Driver	Entrant	Car	Laps	Time/Retired
1	12	(Monaco) Louis Chiron	Automobiles Talbot	Talbot	40	3h46m06.1
2	10	(Italy) Gianfranco Comotti	Automobiles Talbot	Talbot	40	3h48m12.5
3	8	(France) Albert Divo	Automobiles Talbot	Talbot	40	3h49m48.9
4	22	(France) René Carrière	Ecurie Bleue	Delahaye	39	+1 lap
5	6	(France) Raymond Sommer	Automobiles Talbot	Talbot	38	+2 laps
6	28	(France) Eugène Chaboud (France) Jean Trémoulet	Eugène Chaboud	Delahaye	33	+7 laps
DNF	30	(Spain) Enaro Léoz	Enaro Léoz	Bugatti	25	Ignition
DNF	26	(France) Daniel Porthault	Danniell	Delahaye	20	Cooling
DNF	20	(France) / (United States) Laury Schell	Ecurie Bleue	Delahaye	15	Crashed
DNF	24	(France) Louis Villeneuve	Louis Villeneuve	Delahaye	10	Fuel System
DNF	18	(France) René Dreyfus	Ecurie Bleue	Delahaye	8	Engine

Fastest Lap: Louis Chiron, 5m29.7

Grand Prix Race
1937 Grand Prix season
Previous race: 1936 French Grand Prix	French Grand Prix	Next race: 1938 French Grand Prix
