= 1936 French Grand Prix =

The 1936 French Grand Prix (formally the XXX Grand Prix de l'Automobile Club de France) was a Grand Prix motor race which was held at Montlhéry, France on 28 June 1936. The race was held over 80 laps of the 12.5 km course for a total distance of 1000 km. The race was won by Jean-Pierre Wimille and Raymond Sommer driving a Bugatti.

Due to national outcry as a result of the 1935 Grand Prix where just one French car started which was uncompetitive and failed to finish, it was decided that for 1936 the race should be held as an endurance race for sports cars, with rules very similar to the 24 Hours of Le Mans, and featured a Le Mans start. All 37 cars had two drivers, and were divided into 3 groups based on engine capacity: Group I for 0.75L to 2.0L, Group II for 2.0L to 4.0L, and Group III for over 4.0L.

Many entrants considered this race to be a replacement for the cancelled 1936 24 Hours of Le Mans.

== Classification ==
Pos	Group	No	Driver	Car	Laps	Time/Retire
1	II	84	(France) Jean-Pierre Wimille (France) Raymond Sommer	Bugatti T57S	80	7h58m53.7
2	II	46	(France) Michel Paris (France) Marcel Mongin	Delahaye 135	80	7hr59m44.3
3	II	78	(France) Robert Brunet (Italy) Goffredo Zehender	Delahaye 135	80	8hr00m25.6
4	II	44	(France) Laury Schell (France) René Carriére	Delahaye 135	79	+1 lap
5	II	36	(France) Albert Perrot (France) Marcel Dhôme	Delahaye 135	78	+2 laps
6	II	86	(France) Pierre Veyron (United Kingdom) William Grover-Williams	Bugatti T57S	78	+2 laps
7	II	42	(France) Louis Villeneuve (France) Jean Viale	Delahaye 135	76	+4 laps
8	II	52	(France) "Heldé" (France) "Nime"	Talbot T150C	76	+4 laps
9	II	48	(France) René Dreyfus (United Kingdom) Jimmy Bradley	Talbot T150C	75	+5 laps
10	II	50	(France) André Morel (Italy) Luigi Chinetti	Talbot T150C	75	+5 laps
11	II	60	(France) "Danniell" (France) J. Marie	Delahaye 135	74	+6 laps
12	II	38	(France) Albert Divo (France) Armand Girod	Delahaye 135	73	+7 laps
13	II	82	(France) Robert Benoist (France) Philippe de Rothschild	Bugatti T57S	73	+7 laps
14	I	22	(France) Jean Trévoux (United Kingdom) Percy Maclure	Riley TT Sprite	71	+9 laps
15	I	4	(United Kingdom) Adolf von der Becke (United Kingdom) Hector Dobbs	Riley TT Sprite	71	+9 laps
16	I	2	(France) Joseph Paul (France) Jean Sebilleau	Riley TT Sprite	69	+11 laps
17	I	20	(United Kingdom) Austin Dobson (United Kingdom) Reggie Tongue	Riley TT Sprite	67	+13 laps
18	III	90	(Spain) Enaro Léoz (Spain) Génaro Léoz	Lagonda LG45	67	+13 laps
19	III	94	(France) Henri Trintignant (France) Rene Trintignant	Hudson	65	+15 laps
20	I	12	(France) Amedée Gordini (Italy) Athos Querzola	Simca-Fiat 508S Balilla	62	+18 laps
21	I	28	(United Kingdom) Andrew Leitch (United Kingdom) Roy Eccles	Singer	60	+20 laps
22	I	26	(United Kingdom) Frank Stanley Barnes (United Kingdom) James Donald Barnes	Singer	58	+22 laps
23	I	24	(France) Clemente Martin (France) Marcel Horvilleur	Simca-Fiat	56	+24 laps
24	I	18	(United Kingdom) Victor Camerano (France) Suzanne Largeaut	Simca-Fiat	55	+25 laps
25	I	30	(United Kingdom) Earl Howe (United Kingdom) Tommy Wisdom	Marendaz Special	54	+26 laps
DNF	I	10	(United Kingdom) Harold John Aldington (United Kingdom) Alfred Fane Peers	Frazer Nash-BMW 328	?	
DNF	I	14	(France) Jean de Gavardie (France) Adrien Alin	Simca-Fiat	?	
DNF	I	16	(France) Georges Sarret (France) Paul Ducos	Simca-Fiat	?	
DNF	I	34	(United Kingdom) Thomas Graves Clarke (United Kingdom) Richard Seaman	Aston Martin 1.5-litre	?	
DNF	II	40	(France) Philippe Maillard-Brune (France) Charles Druck	Delahaye 135	?	
DNF	I	6	(Germany) Ernst Henne (Germany) Robert Kohlrausch	BMW	?	
DNF	II	62	(France) Francisque Cadot (France) Henri Stoffel	Talbot T150C	?	
DNF	II	64	(France) René Le Bègue (France) Jean Danne	Delahaye 135	?	
DNF	I	8	(Germany) Fritz Roth (Switzerland) Christian Kautz	BMW	?	
DNF	III	92	(France) Andre Colas (France) "Zattzky"	Hudson	?	Fire
DNF	III	96	(France) Bravard (France) Reveiller	Hudson	?	
DNF	III	98	(France) Marcel Lehoux (France) Roccati	Lagonda LG45R	?	

Fastest Lap: René Dreyfus, 5m36.0

Grand Prix Race
1936 Grand Prix season
Previous race: 1935 French Grand Prix	French Grand Prix	Next race: 1937 French Grand Prix
