= 1938 French Grand Prix =

- Race 1 of 4 in the 1938 European Championship
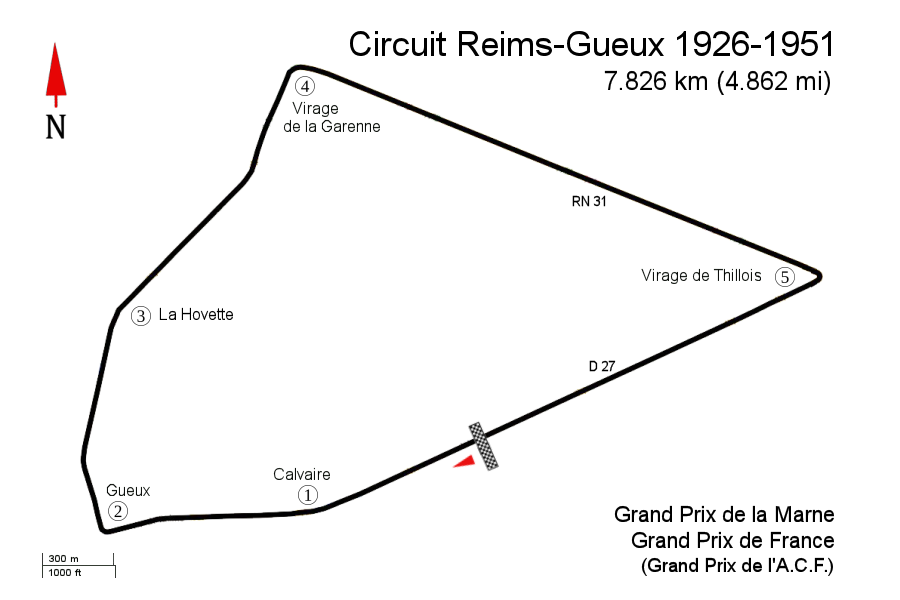

Race details
- Date: 3 July 1938
- Official name: XXXII Grand Prix de l'Automobile Club de France
- Location: Reims-Gueux; Reims, France
- Course: Public roads
- Course length: 7.816 km (4.857 miles)
- Distance: 64 laps, 500.22 km (310.82 miles)

Pole position
Driver	(Germany) Hermann Lang	Mercedes-Benz
- Time: 2:39.2

Fastest lap
Driver	(Germany) Hermann Lang	Mercedes-Benz
- Time: 2:45.1

Podium
First	(Germany) Manfred von Brauchitsch	Mercedes-Benz
Second	(Germany) Rudolf Caracciola	Mercedes-Benz
Third	(Germany) Hermann Lang	Mercedes-Benz

The 1938 French Grand Prix (formally the XXXII Grand Prix de l'Automobile Club de France) was a Grand Prix motor race which was held at Reims-Gueux on 3 July 1938. The race was held over 64 laps of the 7.8-kilometre (4.8 mi) course for a total distance of 500 kilometres (310 mi).

Like the other races in the 1938 European Drivers' Championship, the French Grand Prix was held to new regulations for 1938, mandating a maximum engine capacity of 4.5L, or 3L for supercharged engines, as well as minimum weights based on a sliding scale depending on engine size, with the largest engine cars needing to weigh at least 850 kilograms (1,870 lb).

In 1937, France awarded funds to Bugatti, and staged a Million Franc Race contest that was won by the Delahaye 145 of Lucy O'Reilly Schell, driven by René Dreyfus. The same car, again driven by Dreyfus, won the April 1938 Pau Grand Prix season opener for which Mercedes had entered two Mercedes-Benz W154. Lang crashed his car in practise and relieved Caracciola in a pit stop. Mercedes entered three of four cars in the May 1938 Tripoli Grand Prix in May, for a 1-2-3 podium sweep. The fourth car was denied, even though it was supposed to be driven by the Mercedes "Ersatz" driver Richard Seaman and painted British Racing Green, similar to a blue Italian car.

When additional funding in 1938 was split among Bugatti and Talbot, Schell withdrew her three cars from the French GP entry list and moved her Écurie Bleue team to Monaco. Thus, very few GP cars showed up in July for the first of four championships Grands Prix of 1938. The new Auto Union racing cars were not as well prepared, fitted with slipstream bodies, and crashed too often. Mercedes won 1-2-3 after Neubauer let his three drivers compete at will instead of issuing team orders to ensure team success. Once again Seaman was left out, which spoilt his championship chances early as the scoring system punished absence.

== Classification ==
Pos	No	Driver	Team	Car	Laps	Time/Retired	Grid	Points
1	26	(Germany) Manfred von Brauchitsch	Daimler-Benz AG	Mercedes-Benz W154	64	3:04:38.5	2	1
2	24	(Germany) Rudolf Caracciola	Daimler-Benz AG	Mercedes-Benz W154	64	3:06:19.3	3	2
3	28	(Germany) Hermann Lang	Daimler-Benz AG	Mercedes-Benz W154	63	+1 lap	1	3
4	4	(France) René Carrière	Talbot Darracq	Talbot T26SS	54	+10 laps	6	4
DNF	2	(France) Philippe Étancelin	Talbot Darracq	Talbot T26SS	38	Engine	7	5
DNF	10	(France) Eugène Chaboud	S.E.F.A.C.	S.E.F.A.C.	2		8	7
DNF	16	(Switzerland) Christian Kautz	Auto Union	Auto Union D	1	Accident	4	7
DNF	22	(France) Jean-Pierre Wimille	Bugatti	Bugatti T59	1	Oil line	9	7
DNF	18	(Germany) Rudolf Hasse	Auto Union	Auto Union D	1	Accident	5	7

Grand Prix Race
Previous race: 1937 Italian Grand Prix	1938 Grand Prix season Grandes Épreuves	Next race: 1938 German Grand Prix
Previous race: 1937 French Grand Prix	French Grand Prix	Next race: 1939 French Grand Prix
