= S.E.F.A.C. =

French Grand Prix car manufacturer

Societé d'Etudes et de Fabrications d'Automobiles de Course
- Founded: 1934
- Founder: Emile Petit
- Defunct: 1948

The S.E.F.A.C. (also stylized as SEFAC or Sefac for Societé d'Etudes et de Fabrications d'Automobiles de Course) was a Grand Prix car from France, which occasionally raced in the 1930s.

The French GP racing brand S.E.F.A.C. is not to be confused with the Italian GP racing Società Esercizio Fabbriche Automobili e Corse, otherwise known as Scuderia Ferrari, founded in 1929.

== History ==
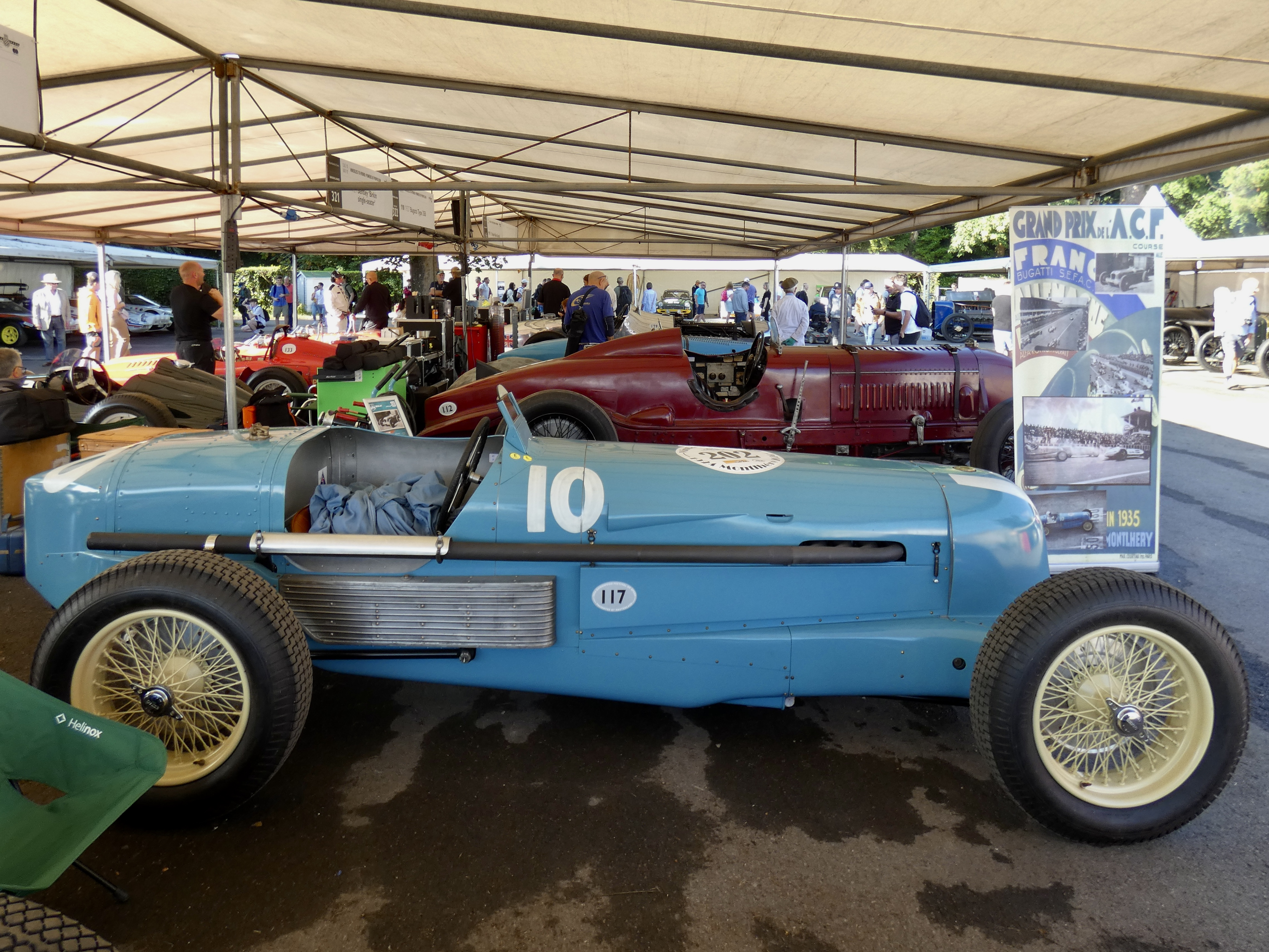
Side view of the S.E.F.A.C., Goodwood Festival of Speed 2024

The car was conceived for the AIACR European Championship racing formula for Grand Prix cars that came in effect in 1934, with the main rule being a weight limit of max. 750 kg (without fuel and tyres) until an engine size limit was introduced in 1938. In Germany, the new government since 1933 had subsidised both Mercedes-Benz and Auto Union to build such cars. While these new Silver Arrows were fast in the 1934 French Grand Prix, none of them finished, and the Italian Alfa Romeo entered by Enzo Ferrari dominated the race, finishing 1-2-3, with the sole other finisher being a Bugatti Type 59 that was lapped four times. The S.E.F.A.C. had not shown up.

The French public was not pleased about the lack of performance by Bugatti, and even lack of participation of French brands like Delage, Delahaye or Talbot-Lago. To raise funds, France set up a Comité de la Souscription Nationale pour le Fonds de Course, thus it was literally Design by committee that operated a subscription fund for the Societé d'Etudes et de Fabrications d'Automobiles de Course, from whose initials the car took its name. The design was done by Émile Petit, who had designed Salmson cars in the 1920s; it was powered by a 2,771 cc engine in a U8 format, with twin overhead camshafts linked by a common crankcase, one crankshaft powering a supercharger, the other the gearbox. However the car only produced 275 hp and was considerably overweight, weighing in at over 900 kilograms.

The S.E.F.A.C. was entered for the 1935 Monaco Grand Prix, with Marcel Lehoux listed as driver, but it did not turn up. It made its first appearance at the 1935 French Grand Prix in Lehoux' hands, and, after a handful of practice laps, the car was withdrawn; it was in fact ineligible to start, as it was considerably over the 750kg maximum weight limit in force at the time.

France then changed its approach and organized the Million Franc Race, a performance challenge for manufacturers. Bugatti entered, and Lucy O'Reilly Schell for Delahaye. Schell won, but in 1938 was snubbed when another fund was given only to Bugatti and Talbot.

A new Grand Prix formula came into force in 1938, limiting engine size, and raising weight, and in theory the S.E.F.A.C. fitted into the new rules. It started only two Grande Epreuves, the 1938 French Grand Prix (driven by Eugene Chaboud) and the 1939 Pau Grand Prix (driven by Jean Trémoulet) and retired both times.

Petit sold the S.E.F.A.C. to the businessman Jean de Dommartin in 1948, who presented the car as a potential Grand Prix entrant, with new bodywork and the engine bored out to 3,619 cc, under the name Dommartin. However it never appeared at a race again. It has since been restored to its 1938 state and is a regular entry at motoring events.

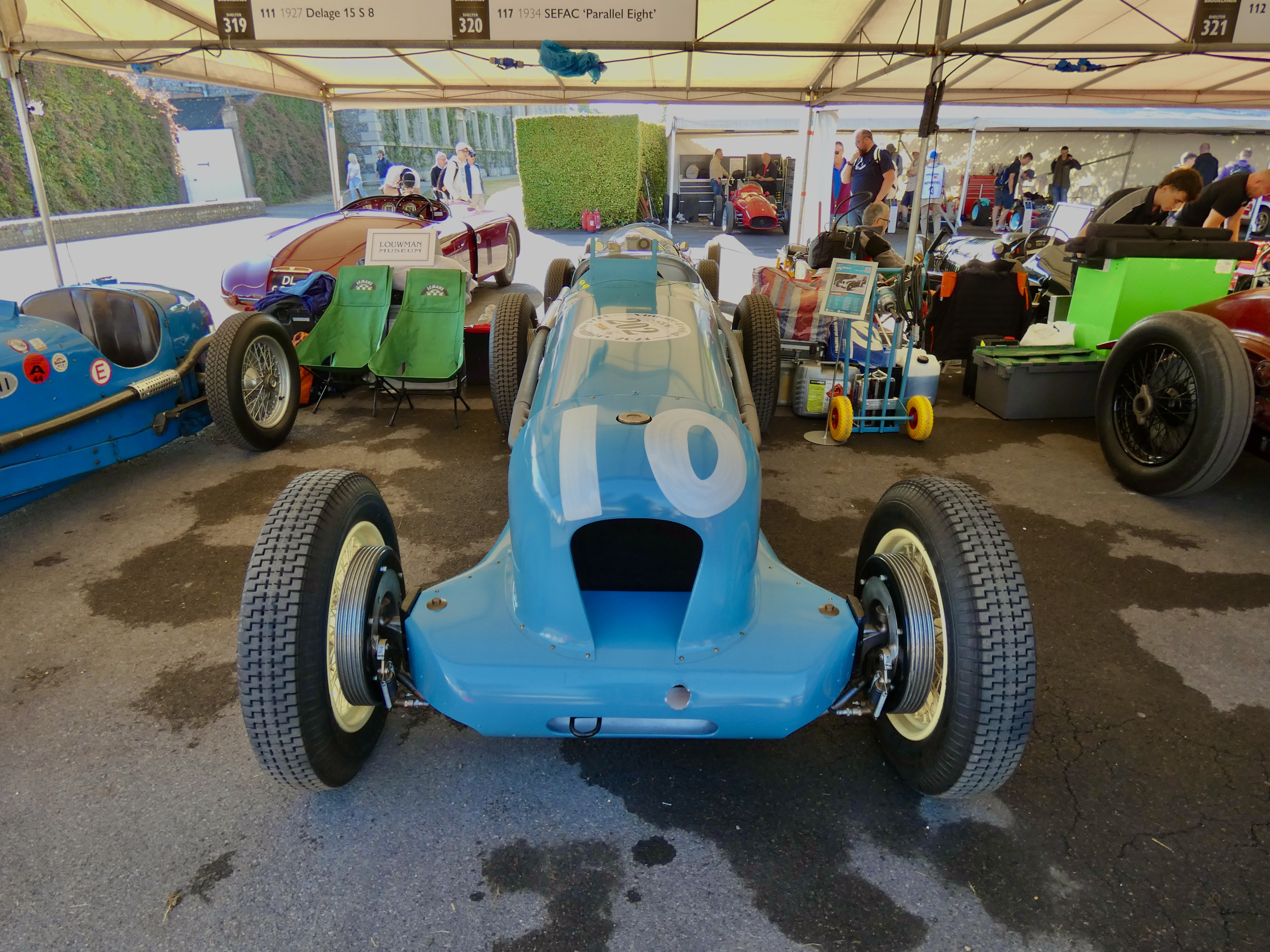
Front view of the S.E.F.A.C., Goodwood Festival of Speed 2024
