= 2011 in motorsport =

The following is an overview of the events of 2011 in motorsport including the major racing events, motorsport venues that were opened and closed during a year, championships and non-championship events that were established and disestablished in a year, and births and deaths of racing drivers and other motorsport people.

== Annual events ==
The calendar includes only annual major non-championship events or annual events that had significance separate from the championship. For the dates of the championship events see related season articles.

Date	Event	Ref
1–17 January	33rd Dakar Rally	
29–30 January	49th 24 Hours of Daytona	
20 February	53rd Daytona 500	
29 May	69th Monaco Grand Prix	
29 May	95th Indianapolis 500	
30 May-10 June	93rd Isle of Man TT	
11–12 June	79th 24 Hours of Le Mans	
25–26 June	39th 24 Hours of Nurburgring	
30–31 July	63rd 24 Hours of Spa	
31 July	34th Suzuka 8 Hours	
14 August	21st Masters of Formula 3	
9 October	54th Supercheap Auto Bathurst 1000	
20 November	58th Macau Grand Prix	
4 December	24th Race of Champions	

== Disestablished championships/events ==
Last race	Championship	Ref
11 July	Superleague Formula	

== Deaths ==
Date	Month	Name	Age	Nationality	Occupation	Note	Ref
1	July	Jean-Louis Rosier	86	French	Racing driver	Winner of the 24 Hours of Le Mans (1950)	
16	October	Dan Wheldon	33	British	Racing driver	Indianapolis 500 winner (2005, 2011).	
23	October	Marco Simoncelli	24	Italian	Motorcycle racer	250cc World champion (2008)	
23	November	Jim Rathmann	83	American	Racing driver	Winner of the Indianapolis 500 (1960)	
5	December	Peter Gethin	71	British	Racing driver	1971 Italian Grand Prix winner.	

== See also ==
- List of 1956 motorsport champions

== See also ==
- List of 2011 motorsport champions
