= Autodrome de Linas-Montlhéry =

Motorsport venue in France

- Map of the entire autodrome de Linas-Montlhéry

- Map of the speed ring of the autodrome
- Location: Montlhéry, France
- Coordinates: 48°37′20″N 2°14′08″E
- Owner: Utac
- Opened: 4 October 1924; 101 years ago
- Architect: Raymond Jamin
- Former names: Autodrome Parisien
- Major events: 1000 km of Paris (Intermittently 1956–1995); French Grand Prix (1925, 1927, 1931, 1933–1937); FIM EWC (1960, 1963, 1970)
- Website: https://www.montlhery.com/autodrom_eng.htm

Oval Circuit
- Length: 2.548 km (1.583 mi)
- Banking: 52° (maximal value in corners)

Full Circuit
- Length: 12.500 km (7.767 mi)
- Race lap record: 5:06.000 ( (Monaco) Louis Chiron, Alfa Romeo P3, 1934, GP)

Circuit 1 (Speed Ring)
- Length: 3.405 km (2.116 mi)
- Race lap record: 1:21.750 ( (France) Bruno Sotty, Osella PA8, 1985, S2000)

Circuit 2
- Length: 5.000 km (3.107 mi)

Circuit 3
- Length: 6.283 km (3.904 mi)
- Race lap record: 2:17.900 ( (France) Johnny Servoz-Gavin, Matra MS630, 1968, Group 5)

Circuit 4
- Length: 7.784 km (4.837 mi)
- Race lap record: 2:30.500 ( (Austria) Helmut Marko, Porsche 917 Spyder, 1971, Group 5)

Circuit Routier 1
- Length: 7.500 km (4.660 mi)

Circuit Routier 2
- Length: 9.181 km (5.705 mi)
- Race lap record: 2:35.300 ( (France) Henri Pescarolo, Matra-Simca MS660, 1970, Group 6)

Circuit Routier
- Length: 6.530 km (4.058 mi)

Autodrome de Montlhéry (established 4 October 1924) is a motor racing circuit, officially called L’autodrome de Linas-Montlhéry, owned by Utac, located southwest of the small town of Montlhéry about 30 km (19 mi) south of Paris.

== History ==
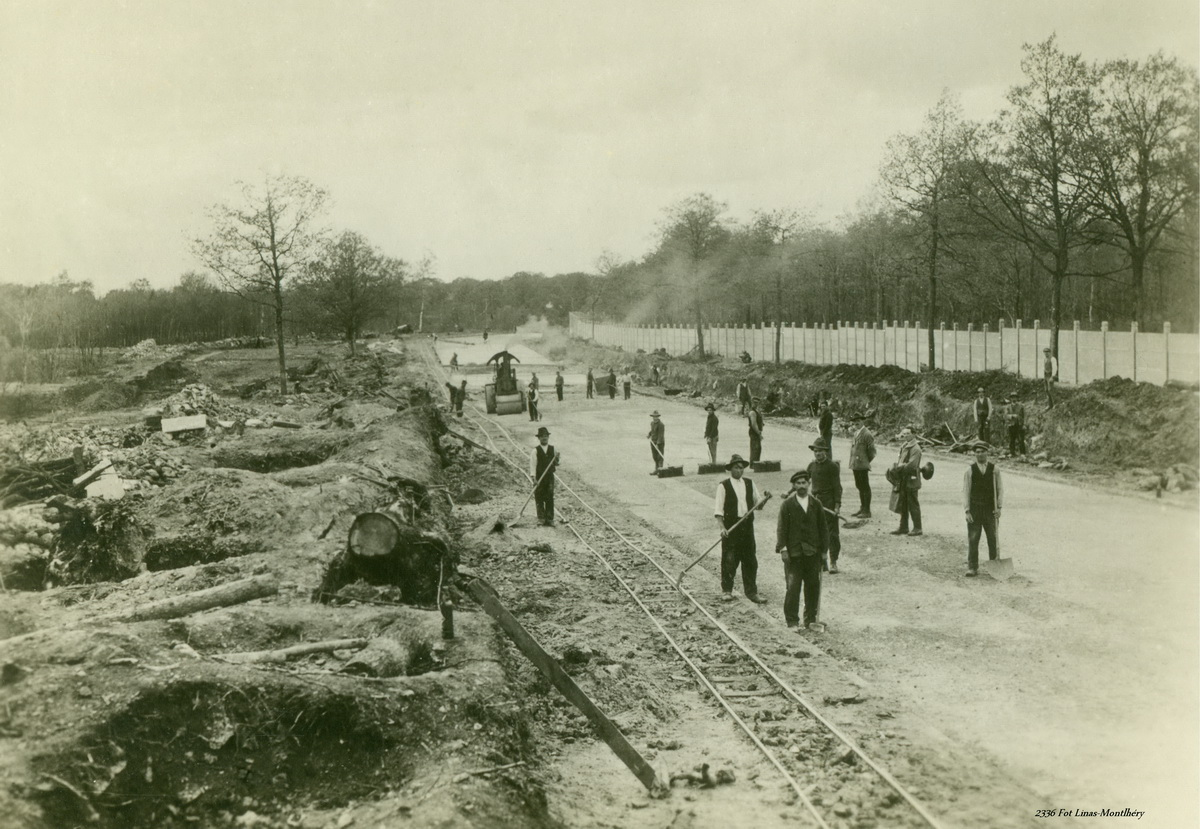
L'autodrome de Linas-Montlhéry year 1923

Industrialist Alexandre Lamblin hired René Jamin to design the 2.548 km (1.583 mi) oval-shaped track for up to 1,000 kg (2,205 lb) vehicles at 220 km/h (140 mph). It was initially called Autodrome Parisien, and had especially high banking. A road circuit was added in 1925.

The first race there, the 1925 French Grand Prix, was held on 26 July 1925 and organised by Automobile Club of France. It was a race in which Robert Benoist in a Delage won; Antonio Ascari died in an Alfa Romeo P2. The Grand Prix revisited the track in 1927 and each year between 1931 and 1937.

In 1939 the track was sold to the government, which deprived it of maintenance during the war. In December 1946, it was again sold to Union technique de l'automobile et du cycle (Utac).

The last certification for racing was gained in 2001.

== Motorcar races ==
The first race, the 1925 French Grand Prix, was held on 26 July 1925 and organised by the Automobile Club of France. Robert Benoist in a Delage won; but Antonio Ascari died in a crash of his Alfa Romeo P2.

In July 1926 Violette Cordery lead a team that averaged 113.8 km/h (70.7 mph) for 8,047 km (5,000 miles) driving an Invicta, and became the first woman to be awarded the Dewar Trophy by the Royal Automobile Club.

The Grand Prix revisited the track in 1927.

In 1929, Hellé Nice drove an Oméga-Six to victory in the all-female Grand Prix of the third Journée Feminine at the Autodrome de Linas-Montlhéry.

The Grand Prix revisited the track each year between 1931 and 1937.

The "Coupe du Salon", "Grand Prix de l'Age d'Or" and the "1000 km" were arranged irregularly since then, as the track has had several high-speed problems.

== Motorcycle races ==
The Grand Prix de France (UMF French Federation) was organized in Linas-Montlhéry in 1925, 1931, 1935 and 1937 with the best worldwide racers.

A competitor Grand Prix de France (MCF Club) was also organized from 1924 to 1937 with the best French and British racers.

The Bol d'or, the well-known French motorcycle endurance race of 24 hours, was held in Linas-Montlhéry before the Second War from 1937 to 1939, and after the Second War in 1949, in 1950, from 1952 to 1960, in 1969 and in 1970. British motorcycles were victorious usually from 1931 to 1959, (Velocette, Norton or Triumph); American Harley-Davidson, French Motobécane, German BMW, Italian Moto Guzzi, Austrian Puch and Czechoslovak Jawa won only once. A legendary French racer, Gustave Lefèvre (Norton Manx) is always the record holder with 7 victories despite riding alone during 24 hours : his average speed was 107 kilometres per hour (66 mph) in 1953. The year after, two riders were allowed. In 1969, a Japanese bike, Honda Four, wins for the first time. In 1970, a British one, Triumph Trident, wins for the last time.

Another race open the year in France, the Côte Lapize, climbing around the hill of Saint-Eutrope : the new engines confidentially prepared during the winter months were shown. In early 1950s, Pierre Monneret riding the famous Gilera Four, 500 cc, sent by the official Italian team, was one of them.

Some races were open to production motorcycles like the Coupe du Salon (morning for motorcycles, afternoon for motorcars) or the Coupes Eugène Mauve.

Fatal accidents at Autodrome de Montlhéry include Benoît Nicolas Musy (1956), and the one in which Peter Lindner, Franco Patria and three flag marshals died in 1964.

== Other events ==
In 1933 the circuit hosted the UCI Road World Championships for cycling.

In 1961 at Montlhery circuit the British motorcycle manufacturer Veloce used a team of eight riders, including managing director Bertram 'Bertie' Goodman and Motorcycling staff writer Bruce Main-Smith, to set a world record on a near-standard Velocette Venom Clubman machine of in excess of 100mph (100.06) for 24 hours for a 500cc machine, a record which still stands.

In 2010 the Speed Ring played host to Ken Block's Gymkhana Three video, an advertisement for his company, DC Shoes.

== Layout configurations ==
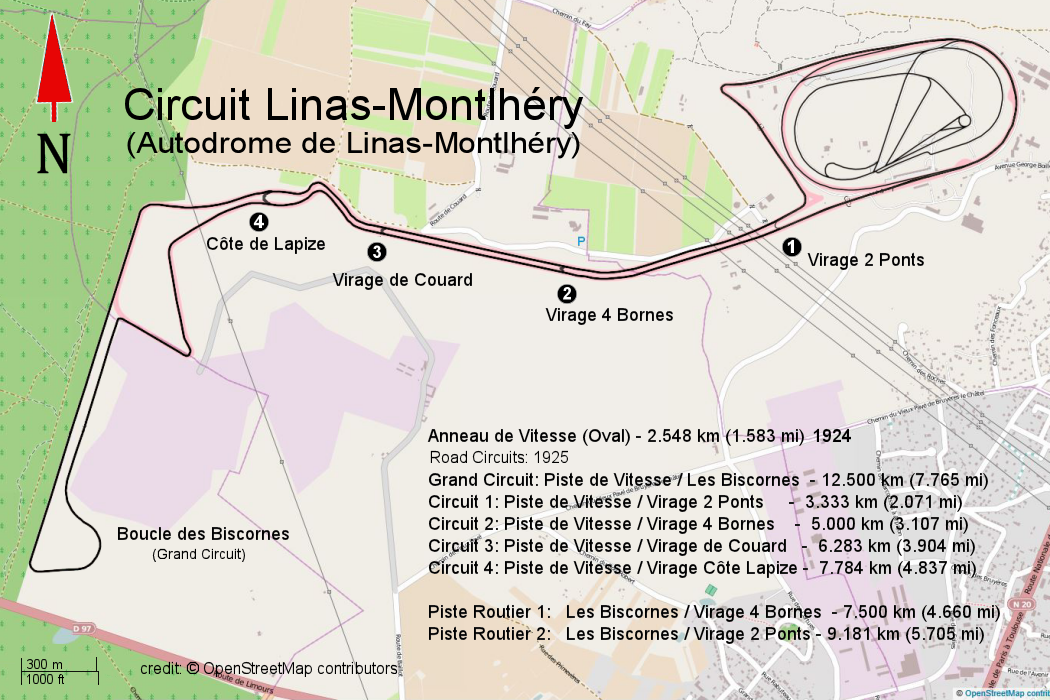
Entire map of the Autodrome de Linas-Montlhéry - 12.500 km (7.767 mi)

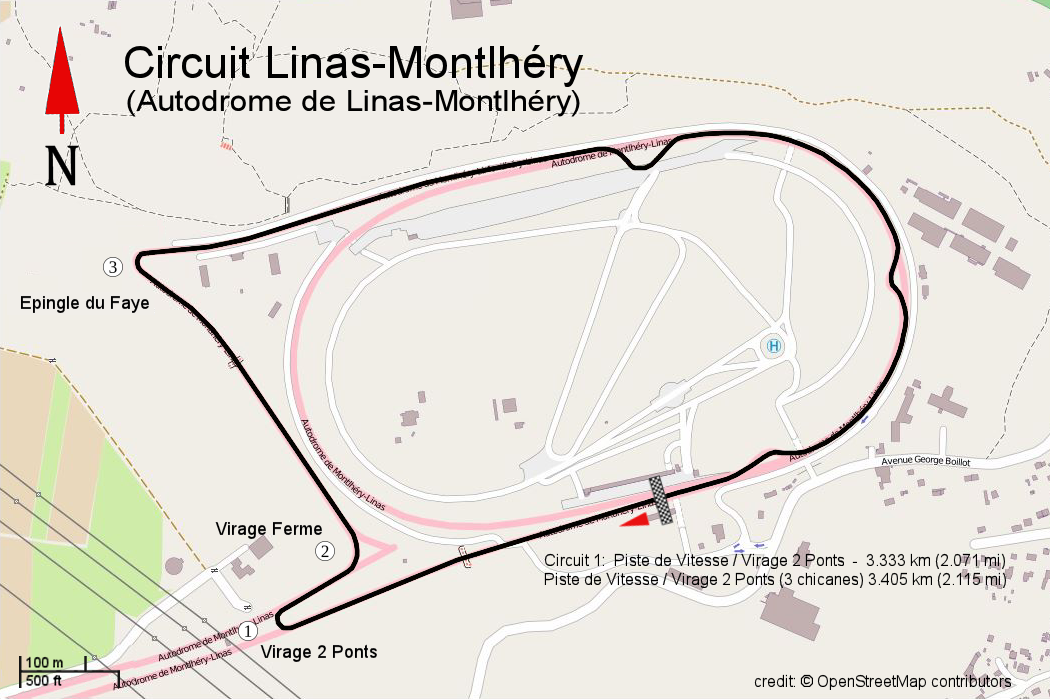
Autodrome de Linas-Montlhéry - Circuit 1 - 3.333 km (2.071 mi)

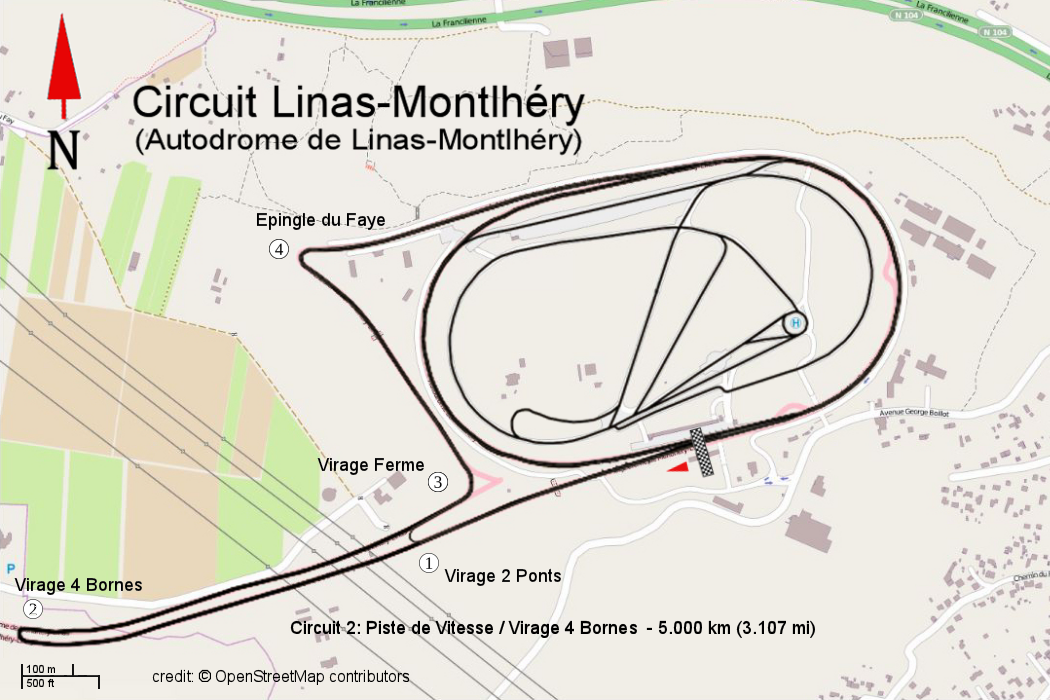
Autodrome de Linas-Montlhéry - Circuit 2 - 5.000 km (3.107 mi)

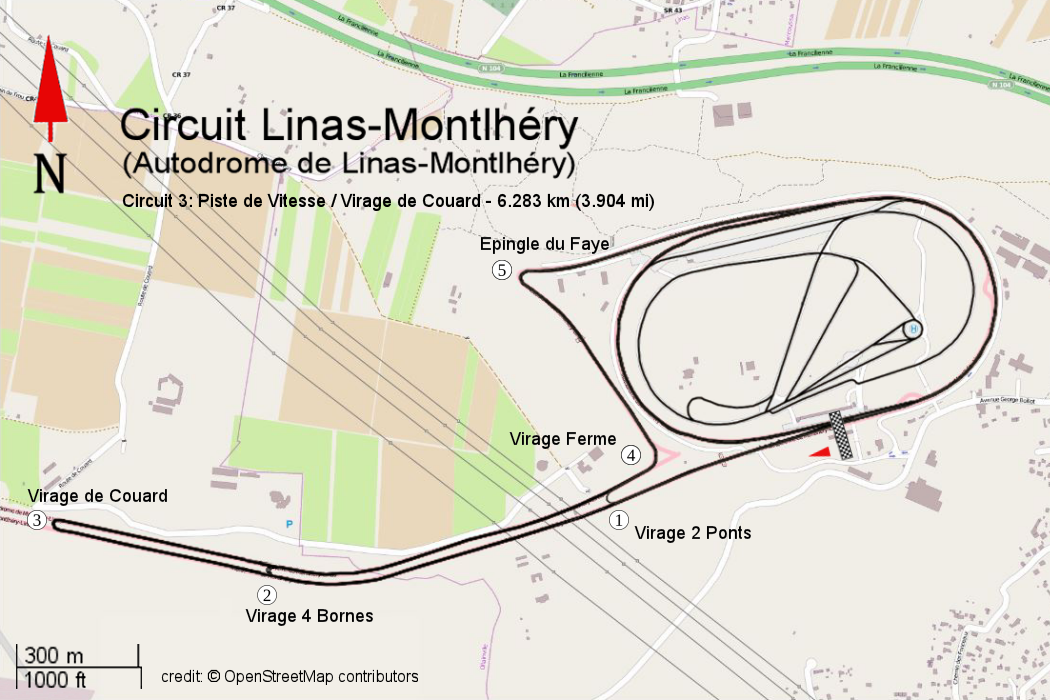
Autodrome de Linas-Montlhéry - Circuit 3 - 6.283 km (3.904 mi)

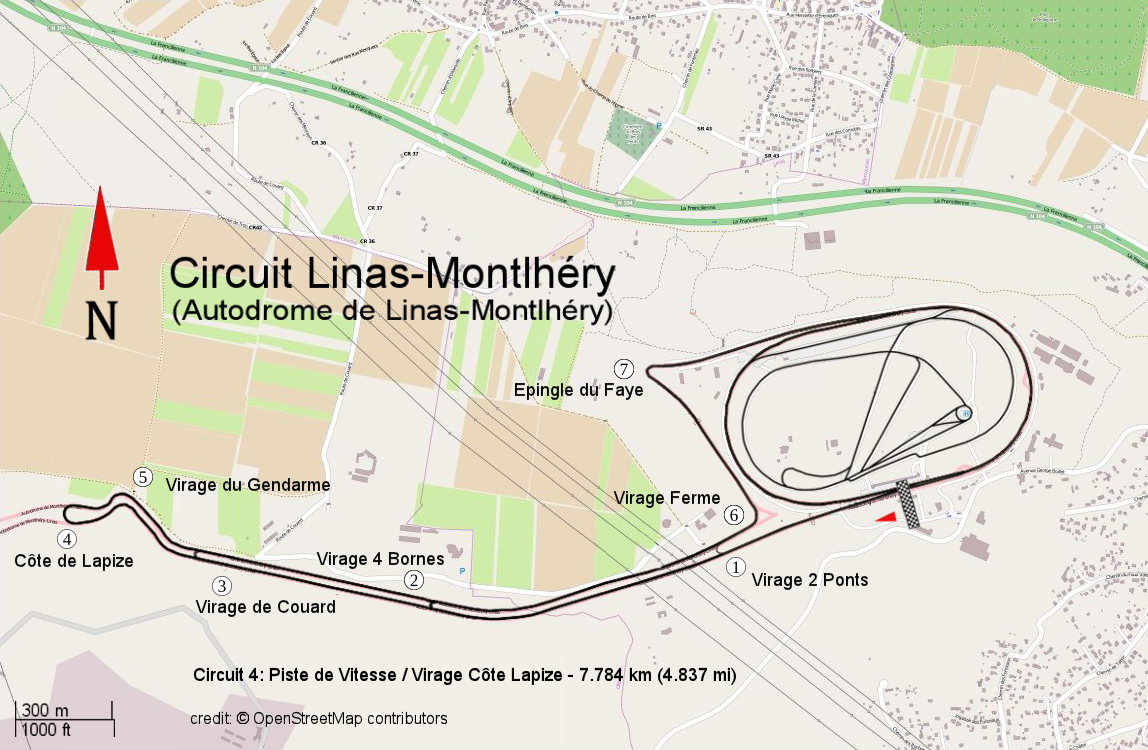
Autodrome de Linas-Montlhéry - Circuit 4 - 7.784 km (4.837 mi)

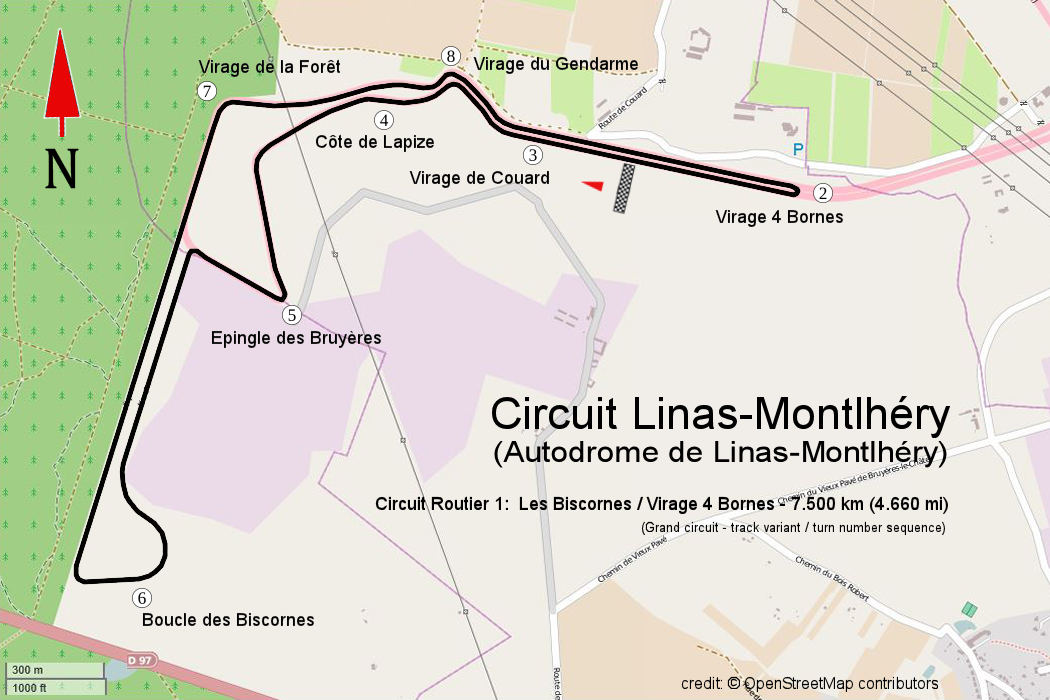
Autodrome de Linas-Montlhéry - Circuit Routier 1 - 7.500 km (4.660 mi)

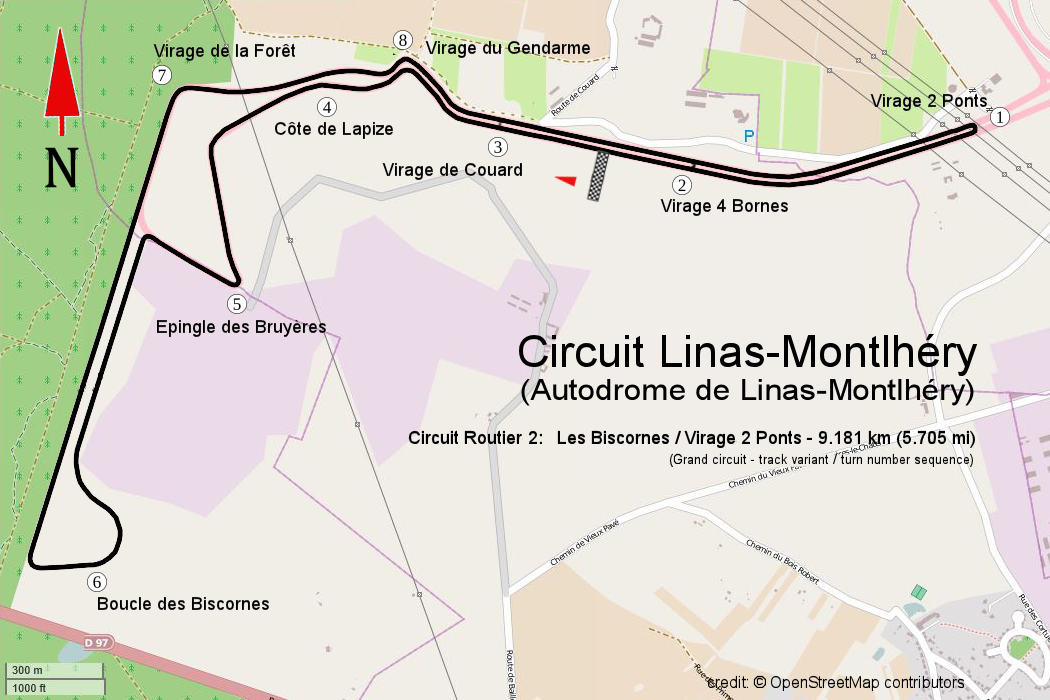
Autodrome de Linas-Montlhéry - Circuit Routier 2 - 9.181 km (5.705 mi)

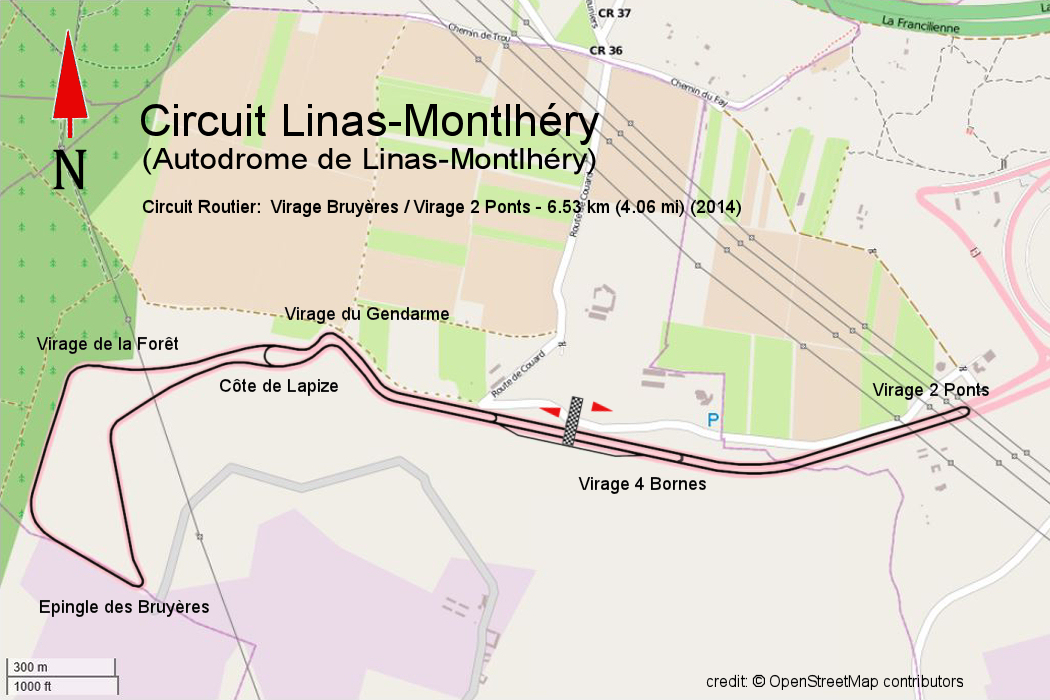
Autodrome de Linas-Montlhéry - Circuit Routier - 6.530 km (4.058 mi)

== Lap records ==
As of May 1995, the fastest official race lap records at Autodrome de Linas-Montlhéry are listed as:

Category	Time	Driver	Vehicle	Event
Full Circuit: 12.500 km (7.767 mi)
GT	5:03.9	René Dreyfus	Delahaye 145	1937 Million Franc Race
GP	5:06.0	Louis Chiron	Alfa Romeo P3	1934 French Grand Prix
Circuit 1 (Speed Ring): 3.405 km (2.116 mi)
Sports 2000	1:21.750	Bruno Sotty	Osella PA8	1985 Coupe D'Automne
GT1	1:21.990	Bob Wollek	Porsche 911 Bi-Turbo	1995 1000 km de Paris
Formula Three	1:22.230	Christian Vidal	Dallara F389	1989 Montlhery French F3 round
Formula Two	1:23.600	Maurice Trintignant	Cooper T45	1960 Montlhery F2 round
Group 4	1:23.600	Gijs van Lennep	Porsche 906	1966 Paris Grand Prix
Group 6	1:27.900	Gérard Larrousse	Porsche 908/02	1970 Coupe du Salon
Group 3	1:29.100	Franco Patria	Abarth Simca 2000	1964 Coupe de Paris
Formula Renault 2.0	1:29.600	Roger Dubos	Tecno FP120	1971 2nd Montlhéry French Formula Renault round
Group A	1:30.990	Jean-Pierre Jarier	Holden VL Commodore SS Group A	1987 Monthlhéry French Supertouring Group A round
Group 5	1:48.500	Jean Mazzanti (Note: Both drivers took the same lap time independently.); Bernard Consten	Fiat-Abarth 1000; Alfa Romeo GTA	1965 Coupe de Paris
Circuit 3: 6.283 km (3.904 mi)
Group 5	2:17.900	Johnny Servoz-Gavin	Matra MS630	1968 Paris Grand Prix
Formula One	2:20.300	Raymond Sommer	Talbot Lago T26C	1950 Paris Grand Prix
Formula Two	2:21.200	Piero Taruffi	Ferrari Tipo 500	1952 Paris Grand Prix
Group 4	2:26.500	Jean-Michel Giorgi	Lola T70 Mk.3 GT	1968 Coupe de Paris
Voiturette	2:37.600	Maurice Trintignant	Simca-Gordini 11	1948 Montlhery Voiturette round
Circuit 4: 7.784 km (4.837 mi)
Group 5	2:30.500	Helmut Marko	Porsche 917 Spyder	1971 1000 km of Paris
Group 6	2:40.100	Jean-Pierre Beltoise	Matra MS650	1969 1000 km of Paris
Group 3	2:45.100	Jackie Stewart	Ferrari 250 LM	1964 1000 km de Paris
Formula Two	2:50.700	Jack Brabham (Note: Both drivers took the same lap time independently.); Jim Clark	Brabham BT21; Lotus 44	1966 Grand Prix de L'île de France
Circuit Routier 2: 9.181 km (5.705 mi)
Group 6	2:35.300	Henri Pescarolo	Matra MS660	1970 1000 km de Paris
