= 1937 Vanderbilt Cup =

American auto race

(United States) 1937 Vanderbilt Cup
Race details
- Race 2 of 3 in the 1937 AAA Championship Car season
- Date: 5 July, 1937
- Official name: II George Vanderbilt Cup
- Location: Roosevelt Raceway, Westbury, New York, United States
- Course: Purpose-built race course 3.32 mi / 5.34 km
- Distance: 90 laps 300 mi / 500 km

Pole position
- Driver: (Germany) Rudolf Caracciola (Mercedes-Benz)
- Time: 20:58.01 (9 laps)

Podium
- First: (Germany) Bernd Rosemeyer (Auto Union)
- Second: (United Kingdom) Richard Seaman (Mercedes-Benz)
- Third: (United States) Rex Mays (Alfa Romeo)

The 1937 Vanderbilt Cup (formally known as II George Vanderbilt Cup) was a Championship Car race that was held on 5 July 1937, at Roosevelt Raceway near Westbury, New York. It was the second race of the 1937 AAA Championship Car season, not counting the non-championship events. The race, contested over 90 laps of 3.32 miles, was won by Bernd Rosemeyer driving an Auto Union Type C from second starting position.

== Background ==
For the history of the Vanderbilt Cup: see Vanderbilt Cup

This was the second and last of the revived Vanderbult Cup races, on a circuit which had been considerably modified from the previous year's, to make it less intricately curved, but within the same footprint, so it had been reduced from 3.9 to 3.3 miles. One corner was also given a banking to raise the average speed. As for the previous year, the formula was one of engine displacement, restricting vehicles to 6 litre capacity, and all entries had to be racing cars, with stock cars prohibited.

The main entry difference from 1936 was that the Silberpfeile came over from Germany to take part; this is despite the race clashing with the 1937 Belgian Grand Prix, which, as a result, had a denuded entry list. The teams travelled to the States on the ocean liner Bremen, accompanied by a number of Nazi Party officials, who warned the team members off from socializing with the many Jewish passengers on board.

The only other European manufacturer which came over was Alfa Romeo, on the orders of Benito Mussolini so that Hitler could not gain all of the propaganda benefits, and even then Tazio Nuvolari only agreed to attend at the last minute, having been persuaded by doctors that his seriously ill son Giorgio was not in any imminent danger to his life; sadly, while at sea, Nuvolari received news that Giorgio had died.

The only other European to attend was Eugen Bjørnstad, who had received sponsorship money from socialite twins Alistair and Esmond Martin to bring his Alfa Romeo over on the liner Bergenfjord; his presence allegedly added 25,000 to the gate, from the Norwegian community in Bay Ridge. The Martins' older brother Townsend had entered a Maserati V8RI for Mauri Rose.

== Entries ==
No.	Driver	Car	Note
1	(United States) Mauri Rose	Maserati V8RI	Entered by Townsend Martin, who bought it from "Raph" following the 1936 race
2	(United States) Jimmy Snyder	Miller	AKA the Boyle Valve Special; retained a two-man body
3	(United States) Ted Horn	Wetteroth-Miller	AKA the Hartz-Miller Special
4	(Nazi Germany) Bernd Rosemeyer	Auto Union Type C	
5	(Italy) Tazio Nuvolari	Alfa Romeo 12C	
6	(United States) Wilbur Shaw	Shaw-Offenhauser	DNA: AKA the Gilmore-Shaw Special; withdrawn because of handling issues
7	(United States) Billy Winn	Summers-Miller	AKA the Winn-Miller Special
8	(United States) Deacon Litz	Maserati V8RI	DNA; withdrawn after a legal dispute over commissions allegedly due after the Martin brothers bought the car from Carlo Felice Trossi
9	(Nazi Germany) Ernst von Delius	Auto Union Type C	To distinguish from Rosemeyer's car, Auto Union painted a red band around the radiator cowling
10	(Italy) Nino Farina	Alfa Romeo 12C	
12	(Nazi Germany) Rudolf Caracciola	Mercedes-Benz W125	
14	(United States) Rex Mays	Alfa Romeo 8C35	AKA the Bowes Seal Fast Special. Bought from Alfa Romeo by California sportsman Bill White in November 1936; it had been Alfa's test hack for the 1936 race
15	(United Kingdom) Richard Seaman	Mercedes-Benz W125	
16	(Norway) Eugen Bjørnstad	Alfa Romeo Monza	Briefly fitted with twin rear wheels for extra grip; sponsored by Esmond and Alistair Martin, under the team name "Balmacaan", which was the name of the Martin family house in Scotland
17	(United States) George Connor	Adams-Miller	AKA the Marks-Miller Special
18	(United States) Bill Cummings	Miller-Offenhauser	AKA the Burd Piston Ring Special
19	(United States) Harry Lewis	Studebaker	AKA the DeBaets Special
21	(United States) Babe Stapp	Maserati V8RI	AKA the Topping Special, owned by Bob Topping of Hawaii, who used it as a road car after the Cup race
22	(United States) Joel Thorne	Alfa Romeo Tipo B	Bought by Thorne from Raymond Sommer for $4,000 after the 1936 race
24	(United States) Frank Brisko	Stevens-Brisko	AKA the Elgin Piston Pin Special
25	(United States) Kelly Petillo	Wetteroth-Miller	AKA the Petillo-Miller Special
27	(United States) Albert Cusick	Schumacher-Cusick-Ford	Sprint car built by Gus Schumacher described as a "souped-up Model B Ford"
28	(United States) Bob Swanson	Bugatti	DNA
31	(United States) Chet Gardner	Duesenberg-Offenhauser	AKA the Burd Piston Ring Special
33	(United States) Frank Wearne	Miller	AKA the Weirick-Miller Special
34	(United States) Shorty Cantlon	Miller	DNA
42	(United States) Vern Orenduff	Alfa Romeo 8C 2300	DNQ: 5mph off 30th and final spot; entered by Frank Griswold and all sportscar paraphernalia stripped from it
43	(United States) Lucky Teter	not listed	DNA; entered as the Fowler Special
44	(United States) Ronney Householder	Stevens-Miller	AKA the Duray-Miller Special
45	(Italy) Enzo Fiermonte	Maserati V8RI	ultimately driven by Wilbur Shaw
46	(United States) John Moretti	Williams–Duesenberg	DNP; entered by Virgil Williams as the Williams Special, with "Bozo" Balus as alternate driver; dirt track car with Duesenberg engine, which broke its crankshaft before qualifying
49	(United States) Henry Banks	Kimmel-Offenhauser	
54	(United States) Herb Ardinger	Welch-Offenhauser	AKA the Chicago Rawhide Special
63	(United States) Benny Brandfon	Duesenberg	DNQ; Duesenberg Model A-powered dirt track racer
65	(United States) Milt Marion	Miller	AKA the Marion Miller Special; it retained its two-man body
66	(United States) Gus Zarka	Ambler–Hisso	Built by Bill and John Ambler of Pennsylvania, using Hispano-Suiza V8 engines split in half for two straight-four engines
67	(United States) Ora Bean	Ambler–Hisso	Built by Bill and John Ambler of Pennsylvania, using Hispano-Suiza V8 engines split in half for two straight-four engines
72	(United States) Russ Snowberger	Packard-Miller	AKA the Burd Piston Ring Special

- DNA = Did not arrive
- DNP = Did not practise
- DNQ = Did not qualify

== Qualifying ==
Qualifying was done by one car at a time, and based on an average of 3 runs of 3 laps each, amounting to around 30 miles, although entrants could run all three runs together, in one nine-lap run; the timing equipment proved somewhat sketchy, with eight drivers undertaking two sets of times because of failings, and others completing too many or too few laps. Although the German cars were much faster on the straights (Rosemeyer was clocked at 161mph; the fastest American car, Bill Cummings' Offenhauser, only at 132mph), the long curves and bankings were more suited to the American cars, as the Europeans (other than Nuvolari) were unused to the different lines available.

One controversy in practice arose in relation to crash helmets. They were compulsory in American racing, but, as the Germans claimed the race was run under an international formula, claimed they could wear their "light caps"; impishly "Wild" Bill Cummings declared that, in that case, the same international rules applied to American drivers, and tried to go out without a helmet, but he was banned from so doing.

After qualifying 24th, Enzo Fiermonte, a retired boxer who had never raced before and who had only just received his Maserati from the factory, agreed a handshake deal with Wilbur Shaw - whose own car had been plagued with handling difficulties - to replace him. Fiermonte had had a number of qualifying spins, and his driving was described as "inconsistent and lurid", all the while averaging 10 seconds per lap slower than the next-slowest Maserati. Also after qualifying the organizers insisted the German cars paint the German flag on their flanks - the first time that the Silberpfeile carried the Hakenkreuz outside Germany.

Auto Union test driver Ulrich Bigalke undertook test runs in practice, and proved so rapid that he was given a permanent place on the 1938 team as a reserve driver. The Bjørnstad Alfa was also fitted with twin rear wheels to improve grip, although it reverted to a regular set-up for the race.

=== Grid ===
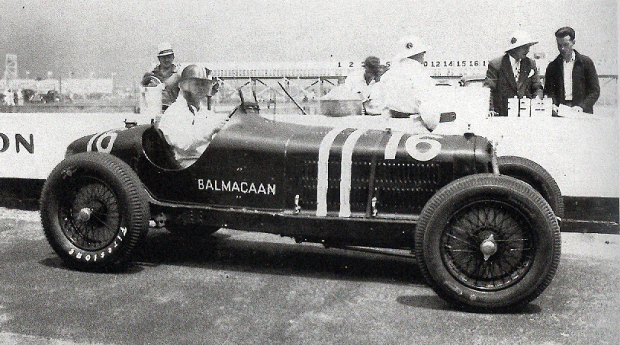
Bjørnstad in the Alfa 8C 2300

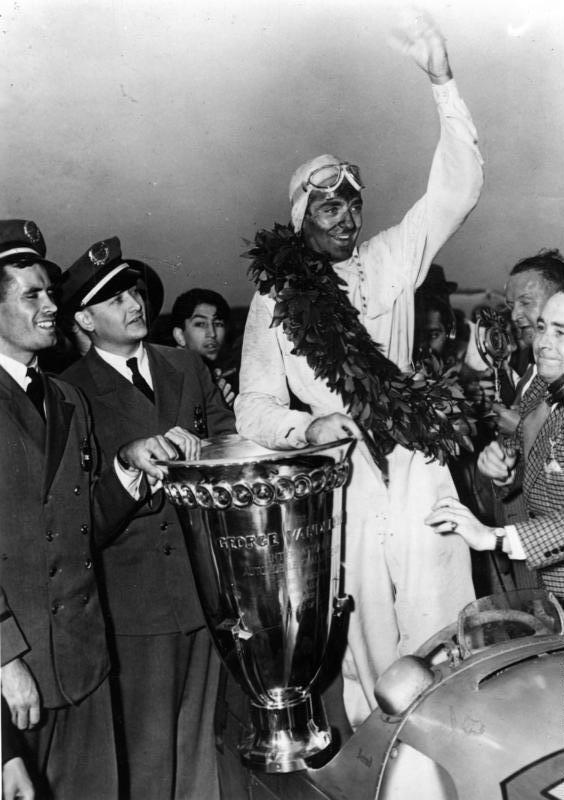
Rosemeyer with the trophy

Pos	1	2	3
Row 1	Caracciola; 20:58.01	Rosemeyer; 21:20.07	Mays; 21:24.89
Row 2	Seaman; 21:38.51	Nuvolari; 21:40.46	Farina; 21:51.08
Row 3	Winn; 21:56.08	von Delius; 22:00.62	Horn; 22:05.78
Row 4	Householder; 22:19.22	Stapp; 22:33.38	Connor; 22:42.88
Row 5	Petillo; 22:45.51	Snyder; 23:03.72	Thorne; 23:11.13
Row 6	Rose; 23:11.62	Wearne; 23:13.85	Cummings; 23:14.08
Row 7	Banks; 23:17.54	Bjørnstad; 23:17.79	Snowberger; 23:35.71
Row 8	Brisko; 23:43.22	Gardner; 23:48.46	Fiermonte; 23:59.31
Row 9	Bean; 24:30.78	Zarka; 24:32.51	Marion; 24:36.97
Row 10	Ardinger; 24:52.16	Cusick; 25:57.36	Lewis; 26:04.75
DNQ	Orenduff; 27:51.00	Brandfon unknown - 31st fastest	

== Race ==
After qualifying, Rosemeyer was installed as 8/5 favourite, with Winn the most favoured American, at 10/1.

The race was set for 3 July, but a shower of rain as the cars lined up persuaded the organizers to postpone it to 5 July (a Monday), although the raceday crowd was claimed at 70,000. The race was started by Ralph de Palma, and in the early laps, Caracciola and Rosemeyer - who did not like the circuit, but nevertheless had qualified second - diced for the lead, until "Caratsch" retired with engine trouble. Mays took over second, a minute ahead of Seaman, but Seaman had been involved in a fierce battle with Winn until Winn's transmission broke early on, and was now free to chase Mays. He passed Mays on lap 26; the two disputed second place for the next ten laps, until Mays' tyres gave out and he had to stop.

On lap 43, with the running order Rosemeyer, Seaman, Mays, von Delius, and Farina, the Italian stopped for fuel, and Nuvolari - whose own Alfa had retired early - tried to reduce the 3-minute gap to von Delius. Unable to do so, on lap 58 he handed the Alfa back to "Nino".

Seaman then started to catch Rosemeyer, and took the lead when the German had to stop for fuel, losing it back in turn when he had to stop. Despite the efforts of von Delius (Rosemeyer's team-mate and best friend) to block Seaman when the Englishman came to lap him, Seaman had gained back close to Rosemeyer, and a grandstand finish looked in prospect, but Seaman, in trying to force Rosemeyer (who had stopped earlier for fuel) to take another stop, unexpectedly required a late "splash and dash" himself, which meant Rosemeyer could coast home to victory. Rosemeyer's victory earned him promotion from Heinrich Himmler to Hauptsturmführer in the SS. Mays took third to a standing ovation, well clear of von Delius and Farina, who was driving a newer Alfa than Mays'. There were no crashes in the race; Mauri Rose provided the drama by running in sixth place with five laps to go when a balljoint broke.

Rosemeyer's prize money for winning was $20,000; Seaman collected $10,000 for second, and prizes were paid out to 10th, plus from a separate prize fund for American racers. The original result had Cummings finishing 9th, but a re-check of the scoring tapes placed him 7th, and leading American car and driver combination, which won him a bonus $2,500 for first American car and $1,000 for third American driver.

== Box score ==
Pos.	No.	Driver(s)	Car	Laps	Time/Retired	Pts
1	4	(Nazi Germany) Bernd Rosemeyer	Auto Union	90	3:38:00.75	600
2	15	(United Kingdom) Richard Seaman	Mercedes-Benz	90	3:38:51.78	495
3	14	(United States) Rex Mays	Alfa Romeo	90	3:44:35.82	405
4	9	(Nazi Germany) Ernst von Delius	Auto Union	90	3:48:09.5	330
5	10	(Italy) Nino Farina (Italy) Tazio Nuvolari	Alfa Romeo	90	3:51:29.75	256.5 n/a
6	22	(United States) Joel Thorne	Alfa Romeo	90	3:59:56.1	225
7	18	(United States) Bill Cummings	Miller	90	4:02:54.3	195
8	72	(United States) Russ Snowberger (United States) Ken Fowler	Packard	90	4:03:47.4	163.5; 1.5
9	45	(United States) Wilbur Shaw	Maserati	90	4:04:03.42	135
10	54	(United States) Herb Ardinger	Welch	90	4:17:18.43	105
11	33	(United States) Frank Wearne	Weirick	90	4:19:19.42	75
12	31	(United States) Chet Gardner	Duesenberg	90	4:22:00.37	45
13	24	(United States) Frank Brisko	Stevens	87	flagged	
14	65	(United States) Milt Marion	Miller	78	flagged	
15	1	(United States) Mauri Rose	Maserati	85	broken universal joint	
16	16	(Norway) Eugen Bjørnstad	Maserati	60	broken transmission	
17	3	(United States) Ted Horn	Miller	59	broken transmission	
18	17	(United States) George Connor	Adams	55	broken transmission	
19	67	(United States) Ora Bean	Ambler	42	sheared flywheel bolt	
20	25	(United States) Kelly Petillo	Wetteroth	39	broken pinion	
21	2	(United States) Jimmy Snyder	Miller	39	broken transmission	
22	19	(United States) Harry Lewis	Studebaker	25	magneto	
23	49	(United States) Henry Banks	Kimmel	24	lost right-rear axle	
24	12	(Nazi Germany) Rudolf Caracciola	Mercedes-Benz	17	broken supercharger	
25	5	(Italy) Tazio Nuvolari	Alfa Romeo	16	broken conrod	
26	27	(United States) Al Cusick	Schumacher-Cusick	11	broken left-rear hub	
27	11	(United States) Babe Stapp	Maserati	8	broken piston	
28	10	(United States) Ronney Householder	Stevens	8	broken oil line	
29	7	(United States) Billy Winn	Miller	8	broken transmission	
30	26	(United States) Gus Zarko	Ambler	2	broken conrod	

Sources: see Entries
