= 1937 AAA Championship Car season =

Auto racing season

- AAA National Championship Trail

Season
- Races: 3
- Start date: May 30
- End date: September 12

Awards
- National champion: (United States) Wilbur Shaw
- Indianapolis 500 winner: (United States) Wilbur Shaw

The 1937 AAA Championship Car season consisted of three races, beginning in Speedway, Indiana on May 30 and concluding in Syracuse, New York on September 12. There were three non-championship events. The AAA National Champion and Indianapolis 500 winner was Wilbur Shaw.

Albert Opalko, the riding mechanic of Frank McGurk, died during Indianapolis 500 qualifying on May 28.

== Schedule and results ==
Rnd	Date	Race name	Track	Location	Type	Pole position	Winning driver
1	May 31	(United States) International 500 Mile Sweepstakes	Indianapolis Motor Speedway	Speedway, Indiana	Brick	(United States) Bill Cummings	(United States) Wilbur Shaw
NC	June 13	(United States) Cleveland 50	Randall Park Raceway	North Randall, Ohio	Dirt	—	(United States) Rex Mays
2	July 5	(United States) George Vanderbilt Cup	Roosevelt Raceway	Westbury, New York	Road	(Nazi Germany) Rudolf Caracciola	(Nazi Germany) Bernd Rosemeyer
NC	August 21	(United States) Springfield 100	Illinois State Fairgrounds	Springfield, Illinois	Dirt	—	(United States) Mauri Rose
NC	August 29	(United States) Milwaukee 100	Wisconsin State Fair Park Speedway	West Allis, Wisconsin	Dirt	(United States) Billy Winn	(United States) Rex Mays
3	September 12	(United States) Syracuse 100	New York State Fairgrounds	Syracuse, New York	Dirt	(United States) Rex Mays	(United States) Billy Winn

Dirt/Brick Oval
Road Course/Hill Climb
Non-championship race

== Final points standings ==
Note: Drivers had to be running at the finish to score points. Points scored by drivers sharing a ride were split according to percentage of race driven. Starters were not allowed to score points as relief drivers, if a race starter finished the race in another car, in a points scoring position, those points were awarded to the driver who had started the car.
The final standings based on reference.

Pos	Driver	INDY (United States)	ROR (United States)	SYR (United States)	Pts
1	(United States) Wilbur Shaw	1*	9	DNQ	1135
2	(United States) Ted Horn	3	17	6	750
3	(Germany) Bernd Rosemeyer RY		1*		600
4	(United States) Ralph Hepburn	2			598.1
5	(United States) Louis Meyer	4			550
6	(United Kingdom) Richard Seaman R		2		495
7	(United States) Bill Cummings	**6**	7	DNQ	444.4
8	(United States) Rex Mays	33	3	**13**	405
9	(United States) Cliff Bergere	5			335.2
10	(Germany) Ernst von Delius R		4		330
11	(United States) Billy Devore R	7		DNQ	273
12	(Kingdom of Italy) Giuseppe Farina		5		256.5
13	(United States) Joel Thorne	DNQ	6	DNQ	225
14	(United States) George Connor	9	18	11	225
15	(United States) Tony Gulotta	8			206.2
16	(United States) Billy Winn	26	29	1*	200
17	(United States) Chet Gardner	11	12	8	191
18	(United States) Louis Tomei	10			175
19	(United States) Jimmy Snyder	32	21	2	165
20	(United States) Russ Snowberger	27	8	DNQ	163.5
21	(United States) Bob Sall			3	135
22	(United States) George Barringer	5			114.7
23	(United States) Duke Nalon R	DNQ		4	110
24	(United States) Herb Ardinger	22	10		105
25	(United States) Mauri Rose	18	15	5	90
26	(United States) Frank Wearne R	24	11	DNQ	75
27	(United States) Ken Fowler	19	8	7	66.5
28	(United States) Fred Frame	7			52
29	(United States) Shorty Cantlon	16	DNP	9	45
30	(United States) Ronney Householder R	12	28		42.3
31	(United States) Bob Henderson R			10	25
32	(United States) Henry Banks	12	23		14
33	(United States) Al Putnam	12			8.5
-	(United States) Gus Zarka		30	12	0
-	(United States) Frank Brisko	23	13	14	0
-	(United States) Floyd Roberts	13			0
-	(United States) Milt Marion	DNQ	14	DNQ	0
-	(United States) Deacon Litz	14	DNP		0
-	(United States) Floyd Davis	15		DNQ	0
-	(Norway) Eugen Bjørnstad R		16		0
-	(United States) Emil Andres	17		DNQ	0
-	(United States) Al Miller	17		DNQ	0
-	(United States) Ora Bean R		19	DNQ	0
-	(United States) Kelly Petillo	20	20		0
-	(United States) George Bailey	21			0
-	(United States) Harry Lewis R		22		0
-	(Germany) Rudolf Caracciola R		**24**		0
-	(United States) Tony Willman	25			0
-	(Kingdom of Italy) Tazio Nuvolari		25		0
-	(United States) Al Cusick R		26		0
-	(United States) Babe Stapp	31	27		0
-	(United States) Johnny Seymour	27			0
-	(United States) Bob Swanson	28	DNP		0
-	(United States) Harry McQuinn	29			0
-	(United States) Chet Miller	30			0
-	(United States) Lou Webb	DNQ		DNQ	0
-	(United States) John Moretti		DNQ	DNQ	0
-	(United States) Vern Ornduff	DNQ	DNP		0
-	(United States) Ben Brandfon		DNQ		0
-	(United States) Tom Cosman	DNQ			0
-	(United States) Dave Evans	DNQ			0
-	(United States) Ira Hall	DNQ			0
-	(United States) Luther Johnson	DNQ			0
-	(United States) Frank McGurk	DNQ			0
-	(United States) Zeke Meyer	DNQ			0
-	(United States) Lee Oldfield	DNQ			0
-	(United States) Overton Phillips	DNQ			0
-	(United States) Doc Williams	DNQ			0
-	(United States) Woody Woodford	DNQ			0
-	(United States) Ray Yeager	DNQ			0
-	(United States) Ernie Gesell			DNQ	0
-	(United States) Sam Grecco			DNQ	0
-	(United States) Tommy Hinnershitz			DNQ	0
-	(United States) Fred Tegtmeier			DNQ	0
-	(Kingdom of Italy) Enzo Fiermonte		Wth		0
-	(United States) Lewis Balus		DNP		0
-	(United States) Lucky Teter		DNP		0
Pos	Driver	INDY (United States)	ROR (United States)	SYR (United States)	Pts

Color	Result
Gold	Winner
Silver	2nd place
Bronze	3rd place
Green	4th & 5th place
Light Blue	6th-10th place
Dark Blue	Finished (Outside Top 10)
Purple	Did not finish (Ret)
Red	Did not qualify (DNQ)
Brown	Withdrawn (Wth)
Black	Disqualified (DSQ)
White	Did not start (DNS)
Blank	Did not participate (DNP)
Blank	Not competing

**In-line notation**
**Bold**	Pole position
Italics	Ran fastest race lap
*	Led most race laps
Rookie of the Year
Rookie

== See also ==
- 1937 Indianapolis 500

== General references ==
- Åberg, Andreas. "AAA National Championship 1937". Driver Database. Archived from the original on October 19, 2012.
- "1937 AAA National Championship Trail". ChampCarStats.com. Archived from the original on April 5, 2012.
- Harms, Phil. "1937 Championship Driver Summary" (PDF). Motorsport.com. Archived from the original (PDF) on August 10, 2012.
