= Bernd Rosemeyer =

German racing driver (1909–1938)

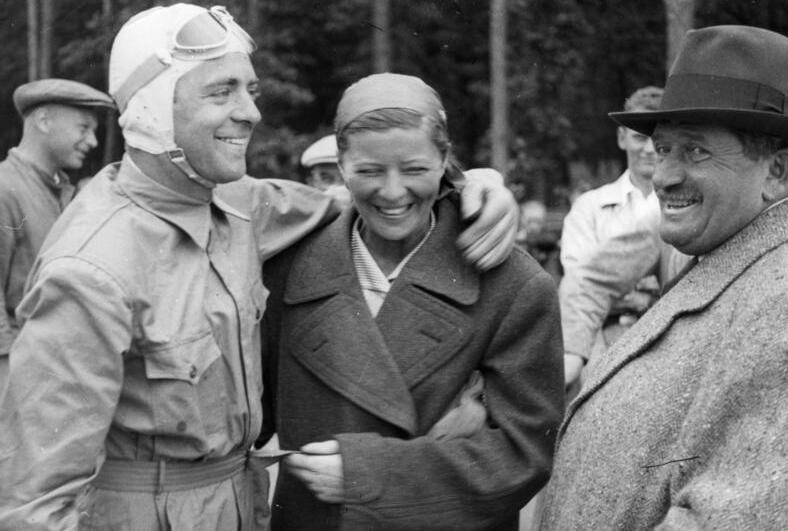
- Rosemeyer (left), with Elly Beinhorn and Ferdinand Porsche
- Nationality: (Germany) German
- Born: 14 October 1909 Lingen, Hanover, German Empire
- Died: 28 January 1938 (aged 28) Mörfelden-Walldorf, Hesse, German Reich

Championship titles
- AIACR European Drivers' Championship (1936); Major victories Vanderbilt Cup (1937)

European Championship career
- Years active: 1935–1937
- Teams: Auto Union
- Starts: 13
- Championships: 1 (1936)
- Wins: 3
- Podiums: 6
- Poles: 2
- Fastest laps: 5

Champ Car career
- 1 race run over 1 year
- Best finish: 3rd (1937)
- First race: 1937 Vanderbilt Cup (Westbury)
- First win: 1937 Vanderbilt Cup (Westbury)
Wins	Podiums	Poles
1	1	0

Bernd Rosemeyer (14 October 1909 – 28 January 1938) was a German racing driver and speed record holder. He is often considered one of the greatest racing drivers of his era.

== Career ==
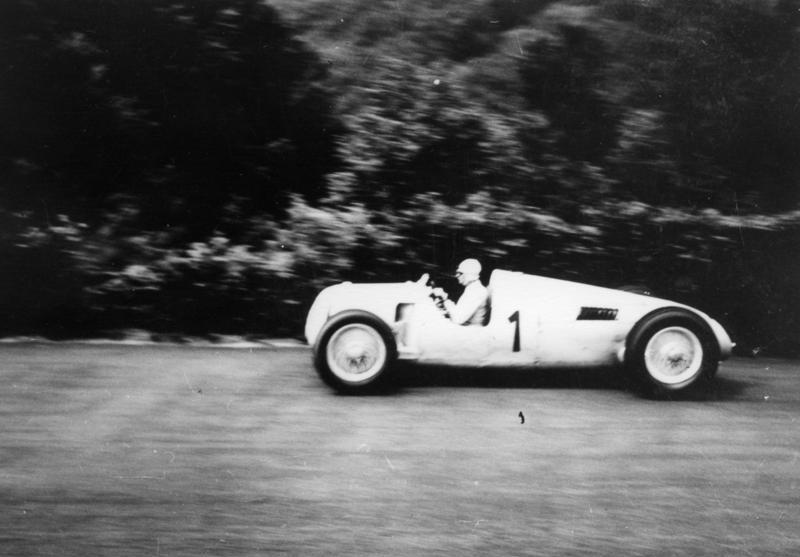
Bernd Rosemeyer at the Nürburgring in 1937

Rosemeyer's father owned an auto and motorcycle garage and repair shop Rosemeyer & Co sur Bahnhofstraße, where young Rosemeyer worked on motorcycles and cars. Having started by racing motorcycles, Rosemeyer became a member of the Auto Union racing team with hardly any experience in racing cars. This was later considered a benefit as he was not yet used to the handling of traditional layout race cars. The Ferdinand Porsche-designed mid-engined Silver Arrows of Auto Union were fast, but hard to drive, and only he, Tazio Nuvolari and to a lesser extent Hans Stuck truly mastered the 500 bhp (370 kW) machines. Rosemeyer was also a very skilled mechanic, so, like Hermann Lang of Mercedes, he was able to give good technical feedback to Dr. Porsche and development engineer Eberan von Eberhorst to further develop the Auto Union cars and set his cars up for races to make them quicker and easier to drive.

In only his second ever Grand Prix, at the daunting Nürburgring, Rosemeyer took the lead from the great Rudolf Caracciola and was almost in sight of the finish line when he missed a gear and was overtaken. However, in subsequent years he made up for this mistake by winning three consecutive races at the Nürburgring, one famously in thick fog. Later in 1935 he won his first Grand Prix at the Brno Masaryk Circuit in Czechoslovakia.

Whilst on the podium in 1935 at the Czechoslovakian Grand Prix he was introduced to the famous aviator Elly Beinhorn. Their celebrity relationship was too good an opportunity to miss for the Nazi Party. Rosemeyer and Beinhorn were exalted and instrumentalized by the Nazi Party to the ideal German celebrity couple of that time. Rosemeyer joined the SS in November 1933, though it is not known if he did it out of opportunism or ideological sympathies. Though he was not a member of the Nazi Party, he was made a member of the SS for propaganda purposes and held the rank of Hauptsturmführer.

Several sensational Grand Prix motor racing victories in 1936 and 1937, in addition to the AAA-sanctioned Vanderbilt Cup in the U.S., made him popular not only in Germany. He won the European driving championship in 1936. Of the twelve Grands Prix contested in 1937 between Mercedes and Auto Union, Rosemeyer won four of Auto Union's five victories against Mercedes's formidable new W125. Rosemeyer's superlative performances that year cemented him alongside Rudolf Caracciola and Tazio Nuvolari as three of the greatest drivers of 1930s Grand Prix racing.

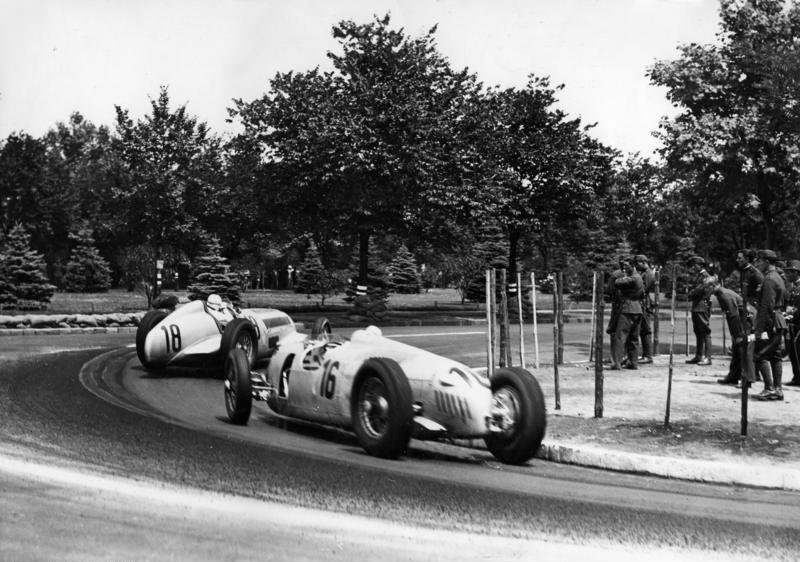
Budapest, Hungary 1936: Rudolf Carraciola in front of Bernd Rosemeyer

Rosemeyer's marriage to Beinhorn added even more celebrity hype. It also made it possible for him to learn to fly a private plane. Before a testing session, he once used a now-defunct airfield next to the Flugplatz section of the Nürburgring as a landing strip, and rolled his plane to the pits via the race track - in the opposite direction.

His son Bernd Jr. was born in November 1937, only ten weeks before his death.

Rosemeyer considered 13 to be his lucky number. He was married on 13 July 1936. 13 days later he won the German Grand Prix at the Nürburgring. His last Nürburgring victory came on 13 June 1937. His last race victory came at his 13th start of the 1937 season at Donington Park.

== Fatal record attempt ==
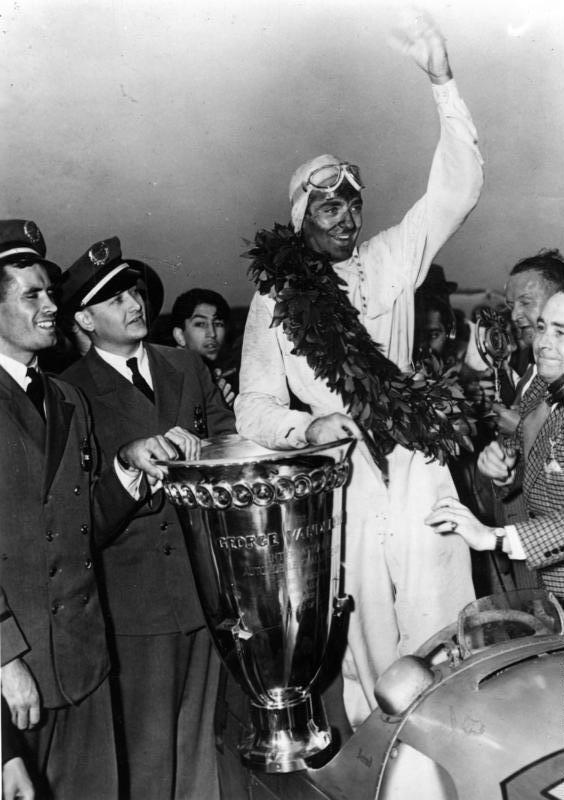
Bernd Rosemeyer with the Vanderbilt Cup (1937)

Rosemeyer was killed during a land speed record attempt on the regular traffic route of the Autobahn between Frankfurt and Darmstadt on 28 January 1938.

Competing for the record against Rudolf Caracciola, Rosemeyer went out later in the day in his Auto Union streamliner, setting a new class record of 432 km/h (268 mph). In an effort to raise the record even higher, despite a report that wind was picking up, Rosemeyer took the streamliner again. After two preliminary runs, he was on his third and final attempt at 11:47 when the car suddenly went out of control. Whether caught by a gust of wind or an unforeseen aerodynamic effect, it skidded to the left onto the median, then right and off the highway, where it went airborne and collided with a bridge embankment. Rosemeyer was thrown out of the car as it somersaulted through the air; he died at the roadside.

== Memorial ==
The Rosemeyer memorial is south of Frankfurt at the Rosemeyer layby (German: "Bernd-Rosemeyer-Parkplatz") on the southbound side of A5 motorway at kilometer marker 508. At the south end of the layby a footpath leads west into the forest, where the memorial is located at 49°58′25″N 8°36′11″E.

Audi honoured the 100th anniversary of Rosemeyer's birth by placing a wreath at the memorial.

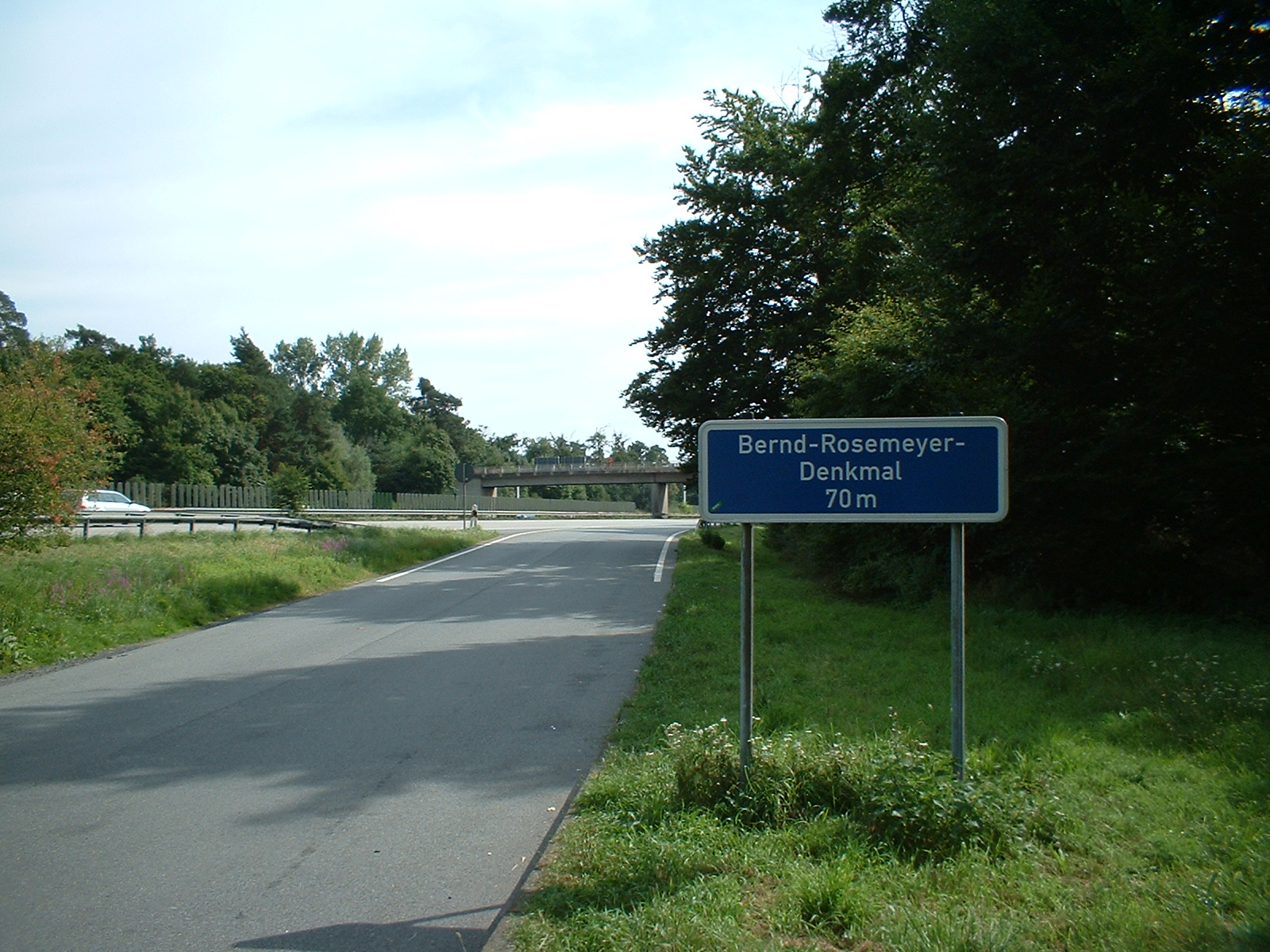
Road sign

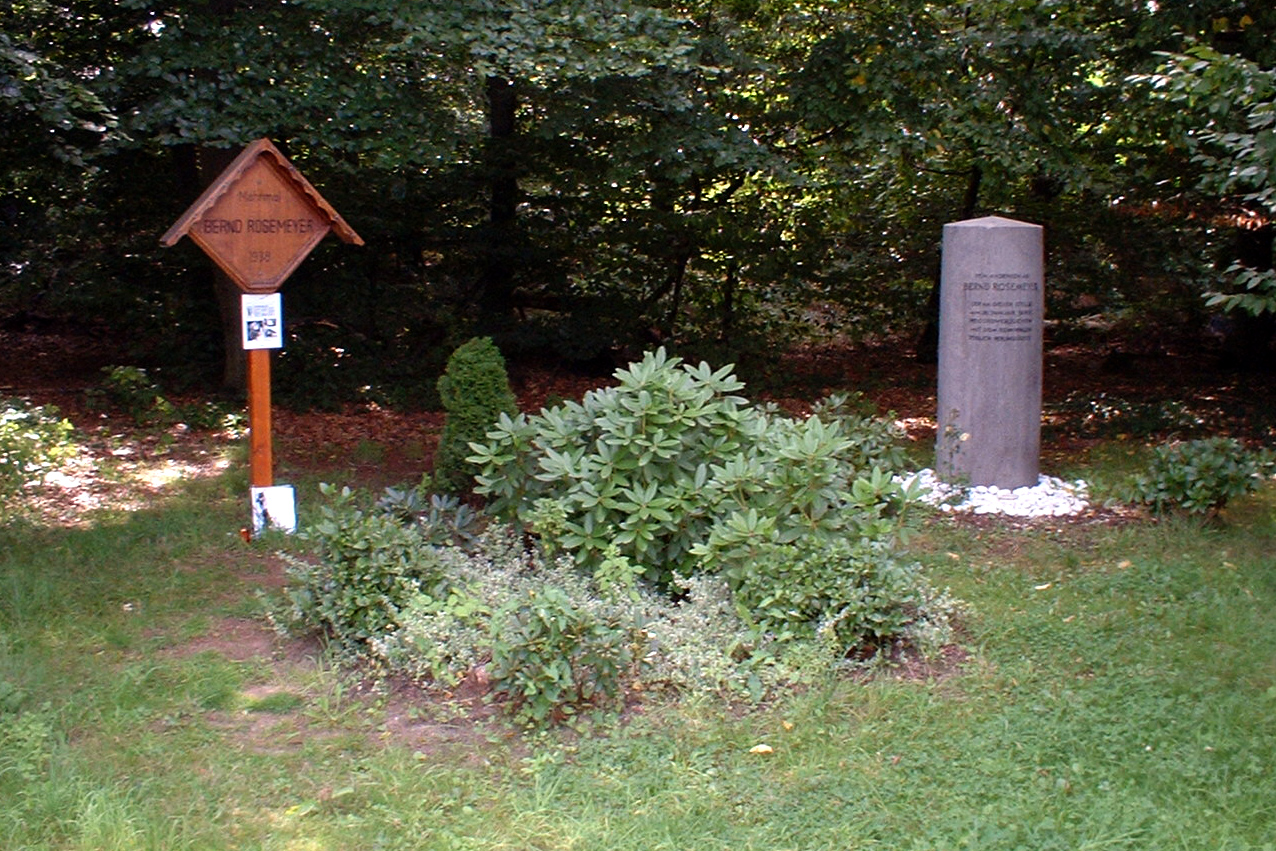
Memorial site

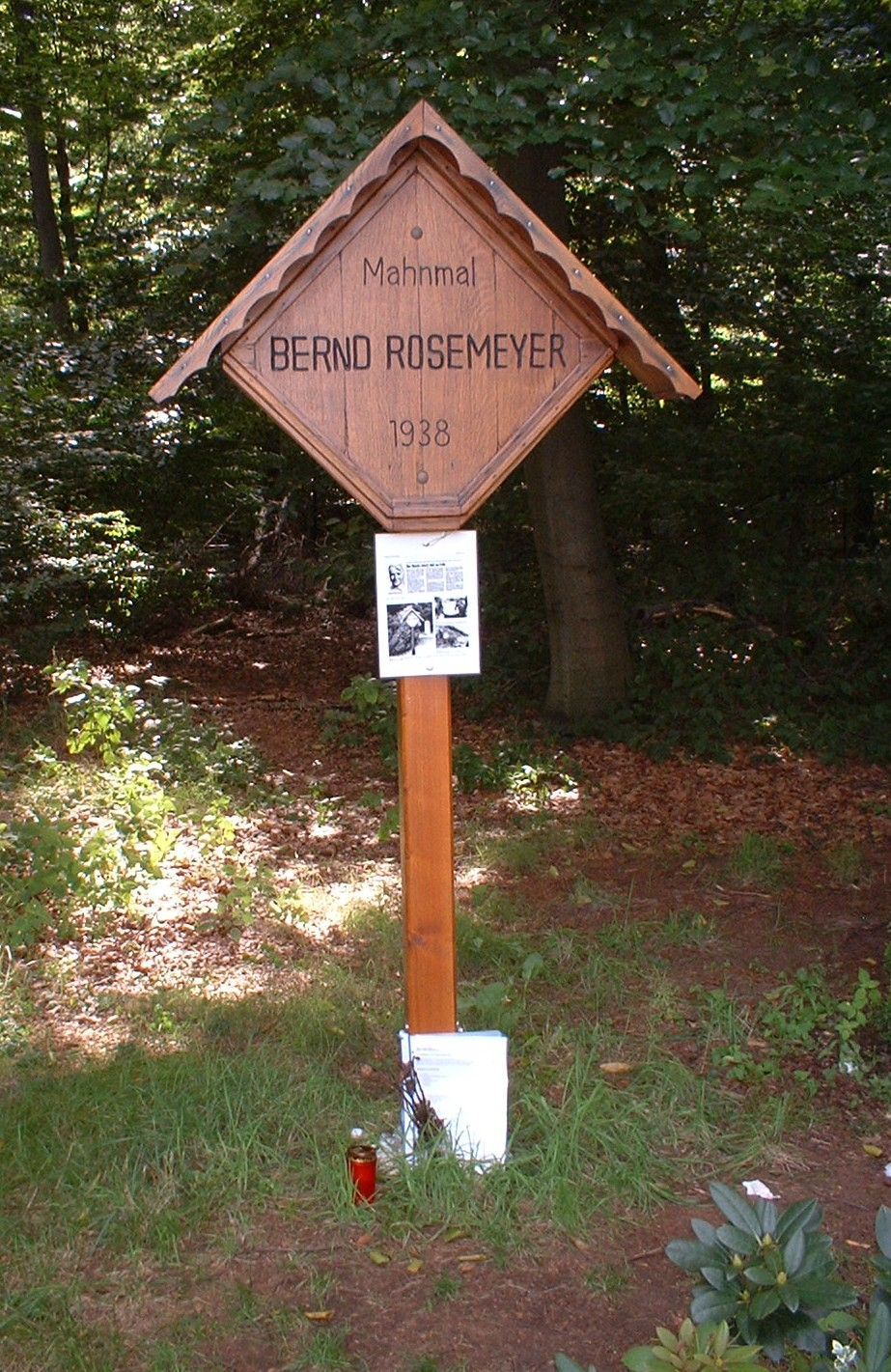
Memorial

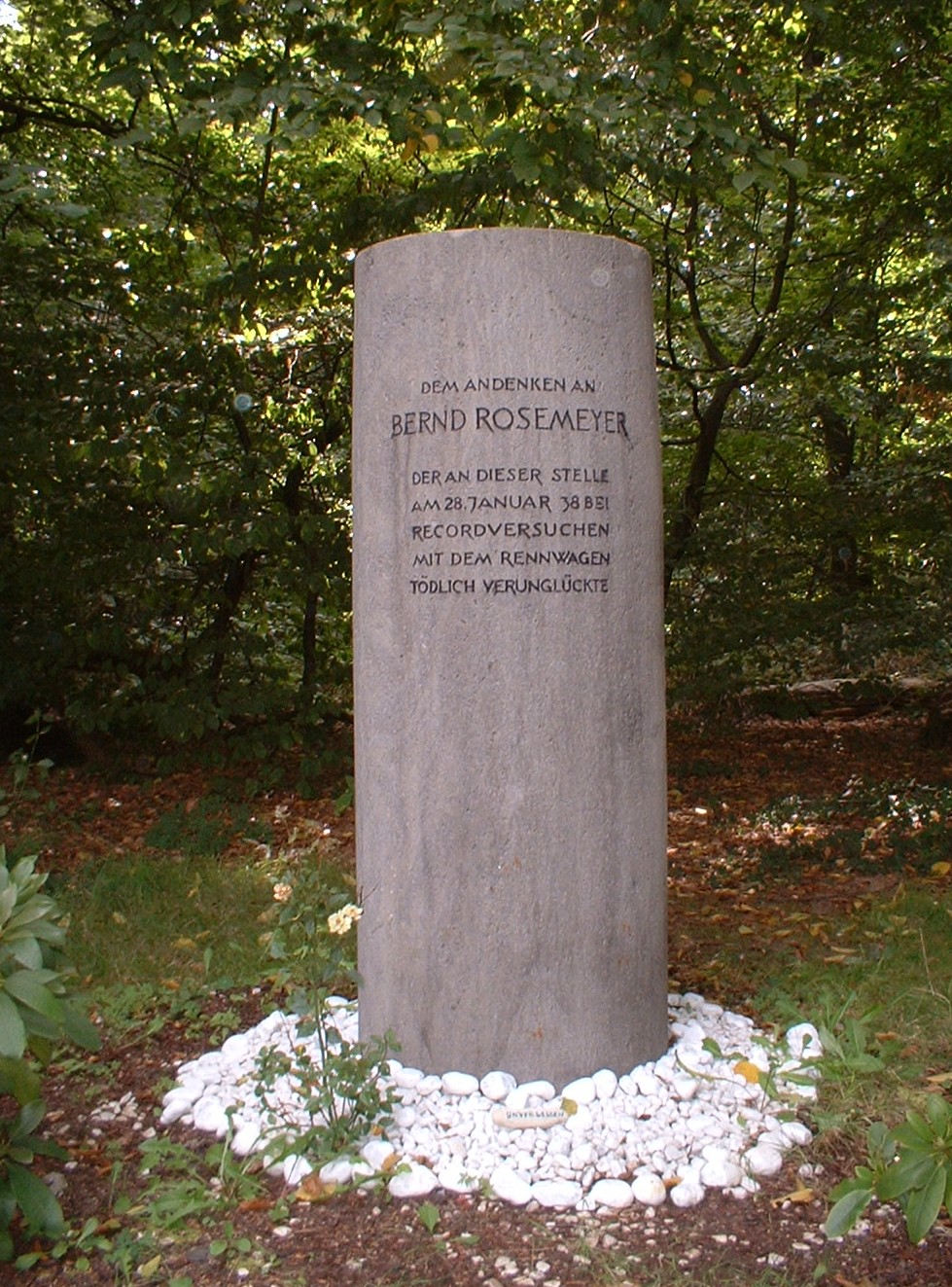
Memorial

Audi built a concept car, the Audi Rosemeyer, which combined elements of modern design with styling strongly resembling the former Auto Union "Silver Arrows" Grand Prix racers, namely their 16-cylinder car driven by Rosemeyer, after which the car is named.

There is also a bronze memorial situated next to the entrance to the Donington Park Museum in Leicestershire.

Bernd Rosemeyer is buried in the Waldfriedhof Dahlem on Hüttenweg in Berlin.

In his birthplace of Lingen (Ems), Bahnhofstraße, where the racer grew up, was renamed by the Nazi Party in his honor as "Bernd-Rosemeyer-Straße" in 1938. In addition, the city is the home of Motorsport Club "MSC Bernd Rosemeyer Lingen e.V. im ADAC", founded in 1964. The namesake "Autohaus Rosemeyer" at Lindenstraße 7 closed its doors on 30 November 2003.

== Motorsports career results ==
=== Notable career victories ===
- European driving championship 1936
- ADAC Eifelrennen (1936), (1937)
- Donington Grand Prix (1937)
- Coppa Acerbo (1936), (1937)
- Czechoslovakian Grand Prix (1935)
- Feldbergrennen in Hochtaunuskreis (not at Feldberg in Black Forest) (hillclimbing) (1936)
- German Grand Prix (1936)
- Großer Bergpreis von Deutschland at Schauinsland in Black Forest (hillclimbing) (1936)
- Italian Grand Prix (1936)
- Swiss Grand Prix (1936)
- Vanderbilt Cup (1937)

=== European Championship results ===
(key) (Races in bold indicate pole position)

Year	Entrant	Make	1	2	3	4	5	6	7	EDC	Points
1935	Auto Union	Auto Union	MON	FRA; Ret	BEL	GER; 4	SUI; 3	ITA; Ret	ESP; 5	5	25
1936	Auto Union	Auto Union	MON; Ret	GER; 1	SUI; 1	**ITA**; 1				**1**	**10**
1937	Auto Union	Auto Union	BEL	**GER**; 3	MON; Ret	SUI; Ret	ITA; 3			7	28

== Publications ==
- Nixon, Chris; Beinhorn, Elly (1989). Rosemeyer!. Transport Bookman Publications. ISBN 0851840469.
- Elly Beinhorn: Bernd Rosemeyer: Mein Mann, der Rennfahrer. Herbig, München 2009, ISBN 978-3-7766-2598-1.
- Frank O. Hrachowy: Stählerne Romantik, Automobilrennfahrer und nationalsozialistische Moderne. Schriften zur Literaturwissenschaft, Verlag BOD, Norderstedt 2008, ISBN 3-8370-1249-2.
- Eberhard Reuß: Hitlers Rennschlachten – Die Silberpfeile unterm Hakenkreuz Aufbau-Verlag, Berlin 2006, ISBN 3-351-02625-0.
- Jörg Reichle: Das Leben, ein Spiel. Vor 70 Jahren verunglückte der Rennfahrer und Nationalheld Bernd Rosemeyer. In: Süddeutsche Zeitung, 26./27. Januar 2008.
- Ludwig Remling, Die Anfänge der Rennsportkarriere Bernd Rosemeyers. In: Kivelingszeitung 2008. Hrsg. vom Bürgersöhne-Aufzug zu Lingen „Die Kivelinge“ e. V. von 1372, Lingen 2008, S. 149–155.
- Hans Langenfeld: Bernd Rosemeyer aus Lingen, ein Star der „braunen Dreißiger“. In: Jahrbuch / Niedersächsisches Institut für Sportgeschichte Hoya, 10, 2008, S. 242–262
- Peter Kirchberg (Hrsg.): Die Schicksalsfahrt, Verlag Delius Klasing, Bielefeld 2008, ISBN 978-3-7688-2505-4.
- Cesare De Agostini: Rosemeyer. L'asso invincibile. G. Nada Editore, Vimodrone 2009, ISBN 978-88-7911-475-2.
- Christoph Frilling, Elly Beinhorn und Bernd Rosemeyer – kleiner Grenzverkehr zwischen Resistenz und Kumpanei im Nationalsozialismus. Studien zu Habitus und Sprache prominenter Mitläufer, Verlag Peter Lang, Frankfurt am Main 2009 ISBN 3-631-58836-4.
- Christoph Frilling, Die Pilotin und der Rennfahrer – Elly Beinhorn und Bernd Rosemeyer auf Gratwanderung im Nationalsozialismus. Verlag W. Dietrich, Reinhardtsgrimma 2009, ISBN 978-3-933500-10-6.

Sporting achievements
Preceded by Rudolf Caracciola	European Drivers' Champion; 1936	Succeeded by Rudolf Caracciola
Preceded by Hans Stuck	German Mountain Climb Champion; 1936	Succeeded by Hans Stuck
