= Henry Banks =

American racing driver (1913–1994)

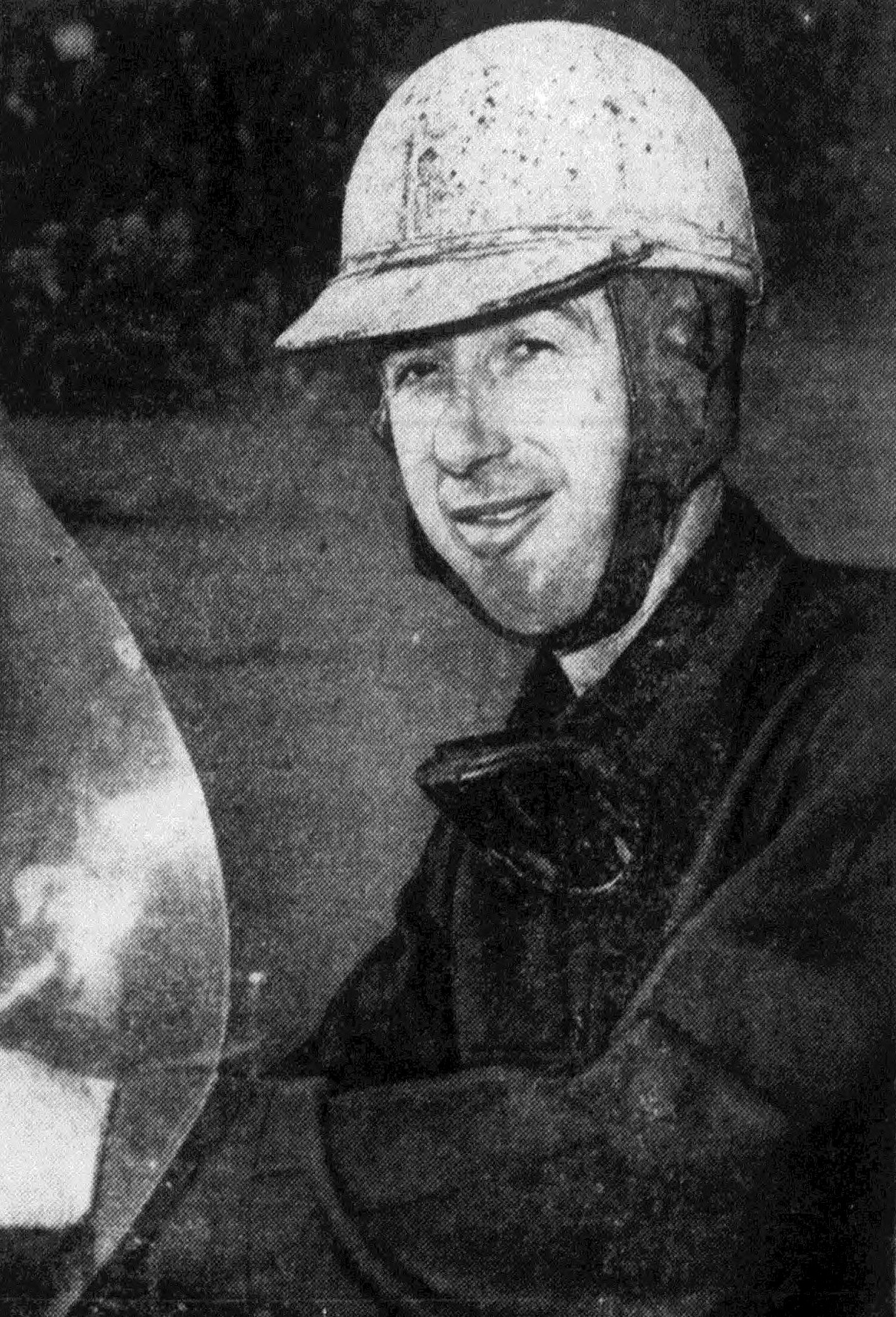
- Banks, circa 1951
- Born: Henry Edwin Banks; June 14, 1913 Croydon, Surrey, England
- Died: December 18, 1994 (aged 81) Indianapolis, Indiana, U.S.

Championship titles
- AAA Championship Car (1950)

Champ Car career
- 43 races run over 15 years
- Best finish: 1st (1950)
- First race: 1935 Syracuse 100 (Syracuse)
- Last race: 1952 Phoenix 100 (Phoenix)
- First win: 1950 Detroit 100 (Detroit)
Wins	Podiums	Poles
1	9	1

Formula One World Championship career
- Active years: 1950–1954
- Team(s): Maserati, Moore, Lesovsky
- Entries: 5 (3 starts)
- Championships: 0
- Wins: 0
- Podiums: 0
- Career points: 0
- Pole positions: 0
- Fastest laps: 0
- First entry: 1950 Indianapolis 500
- Last entry: 1954 Indianapolis 500

Henry Edwin Banks (June 14, 1913 – December 18, 1994) was an American racing driver. He competed in various disciplines of open-wheel motorsport. Banks is best remembered for winning the 1950 AAA National Championship, and for his later career as a USAC race official.

== Early life ==
Henry Banks was born in England, but brought up in Royal Oak, Michigan. He was the son of an early European race-driver.

== Driving career ==
=== Early career ===
Banks began competing in 1932, when he was 19 years old, and became successful in midget cars.

Banks was the first driver to pass the qualifying "rookie test" instituted at the Indianapolis Motor Speedway beginning in 1936. He also drove as a relief driver in 1937, 1939, and 1940, with a 21st-place finish in 1938.

Banks won the 1941 American Racing Drivers Club (ARDC) championship in New England.

=== Post-war career and AAA Championship ===
After a break during the war, when he worked at Ford’s aero-engine division, Banks’ career took off. In 1947, he won 30 midget car races. In 1950, he was the AAA National Champion, winning a three-way battle for the title during the final race of the season. That same year, he came second in AAA National Midget points.

=== World Drivers' Championship career ===
The AAA/USAC-sanctioned Indianapolis 500 was included in the FIA World Drivers' Championship from 1950 through 1960. Drivers competing at Indianapolis during those years were credited with World Drivers' Championship participation, and were eligible to score WDC points alongside those which they may have scored towards the AAA/USAC National Championship.

Banks participated in three World Drivers' Championship races at Indianapolis. His best finish was sixth place, and he scored no World Drivers' Championship points.

== Post-driving life ==
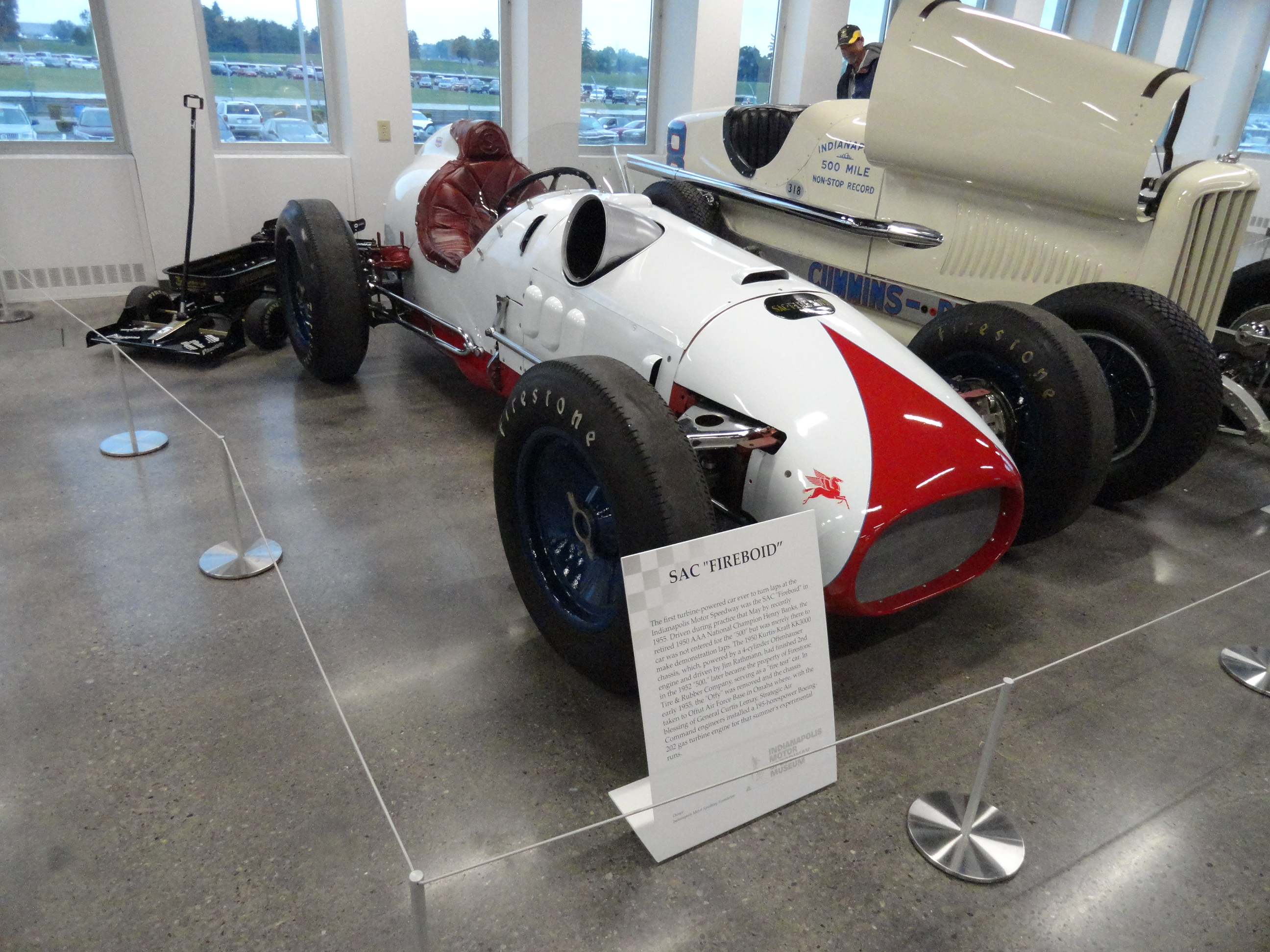
Banks tested the first-ever turbine-powered car at Indianapolis in 1955

After Banks retired from competition, he occasionally tested other automobiles. Later, he became the USAC Director of Competitions. He died in Indianapolis in 1994.

== Actor ==
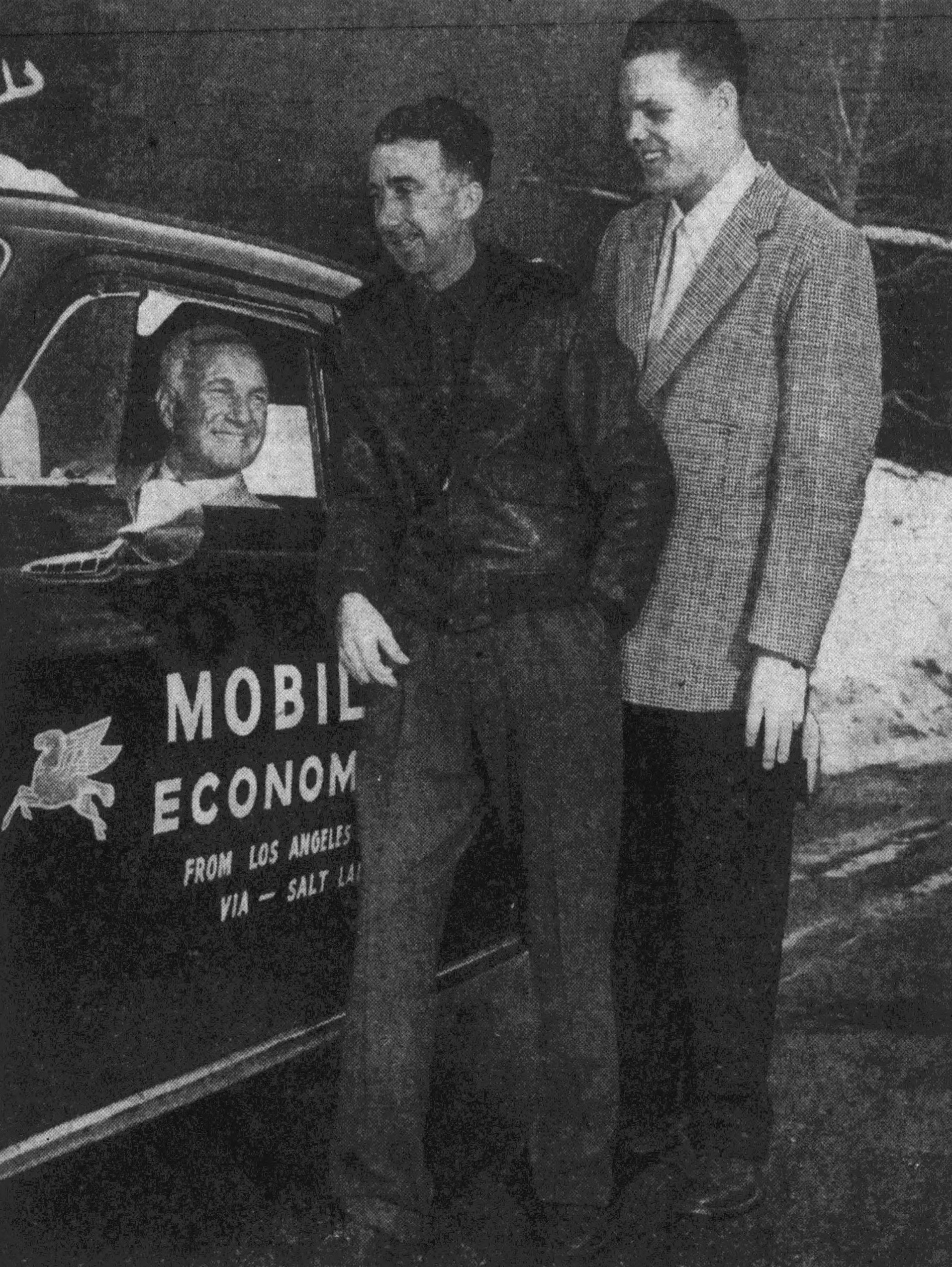
Banks (center), with Ralph DePalma and Troy Ruttman in 1952

Banks appeared in two racing-related films during his career. The first was To Please A Lady, starring Clark Gable. The second was Roar of the Crowd, starring Howard Duff.

== Awards and honors ==
Banks has been inducted into the following halls of fame:

- Michigan Motor Sports Hall of Fame (1982)
- Auto Racing Hall of Fame (1985)
- National Midget Auto Racing Hall of Fame (1987)
- Eastern Motorsports Press Association Hall of Fame (1988)
- United States Auto Club (USAC) Hall of Fame (2013)
- Motorsports Hall of Fame of America (2023)

Banks has been awarded the following honors:

- Automotive Hall of Fame Distinguished Service Citation (1978)

== Motorsports career results ==
=== Complete AAA Championship Car results ===
(key) (Races in bold indicate pole position)

Year	Team	1	2	3	4	5	6	7	8	9	10	11	12	13	14	15	Pos	Points	Ref
1935	Michel de Baets	INDY	HAM	SPR	SYR; 12	ALT; 9	LAN										26th	20	
1935	Lawrence Martz					ALT; DNQ											26th	20	
1936	Ralph DePalma	INDY; DNQ	GOS	SYR; 11													NC	0	
1936	Louis Kimmel				ROR; 20												NC	0	
1937	Louis Kimmel	INDY; DNQ	ROR; 23	SYR													32nd	14	
1938	Louis Kimmel	INDY; 21	SYR														NC	0	
1939	Bill Cheesman	INDY; DNQ															23rd	38.5	
1939	Leon Duray	INDY; 10*	MIL	SYR													23rd	38.5	
1940	Bill Cheesman	INDY; DNQ	SPR	SYR													NC	0	
1946	Lou Rassey	INDY; 27	LAN; DNQ	ATL	ISF	MIL	GOS										NC	0	
1947	Federal Engineering	INDY; 24	MIL	LAN	ATL	BAI	MIL	GOS	MIL	PIK	SPR	ARL					NC	0	
1948	Lou Fageol	ARL; 13															NC	0	
1948	Federal Engineering		INDY; DNQ	MIL	LAN	MIL	SPR	MIL	DUQ	ATL	PIK	SPR	DUQ				NC	0	
1949	Federal Engineering	ARL	INDY; DNQ	MIL	TRE	SPR	MIL	DUQ	PIK	SYR	DET; DNQ						NC	0	
1949	Ray Carter											SPR; DNQ	LAN	SAC	DMR		NC	0	
1950	Indianapolis Racing Cars	INDY; 25															1st	1,390	
1950	Lou Moore		MIL; 5	LAN; 2	SPR; DNQ	MIL; 2	PIK	SYR; DNQ	DET; 1	SPR; 18	SAC; 3	PHX; 12	BAY; 4	DAR; 3			1st	1,390	
1951	Lou Moore	INDY; 6	MIL; 11	LAN; 10	DAR; 7	SPR; 4	MIL; 5	DUQ; 6	DUQ; 5	PIK	SYR; 6	DET; 9	DNC; 2	SJS; 3	**PHX**; 2	BAY; 3	2nd	1,856.6	
1952	Lou Moore	INDY; 19	MIL; DNQ	RAL; 10	SPR; 7	MIL; 4	DET; 6	DUQ; 7	PIK	SYR; 8	DNC; 8	SJS; 17	PHX; 5				10th	700	
1953	Lindsey Hopkins	INDY; DNQ	MIL; Wth	SPR	DET	SPR	MIL	DUQ	PIK	SYR	ISF	SAC	PHX				NC	0	
1954	Lindsey Hopkins	INDY; DNQ	MIL	LAN	DAR	SPR	MIL	DUQ	PIK	SYR	ISF	SAC	PHX	LVG			NC	0	

* shared drive with Billy Devore, received 38.5 points.

=== Indianapolis 500 results ===
Year	Car	Start	Qual	Rank	Finish	Laps	Led	Retired
1938	33	31	116.279	31	21	109	0	Rod bearing
1946	3	21	120.220	25	27	32	0	Pinion shaft
1947	43	26	120.923	18	24	36	0	Oil line
1950	12	21	129.646	29	25	112	0	Flagged
1951	1	17	133.899	12	6	200	0	Running
1952	2	12	135.962	12	19	184	0	Flagged
**Totals**						673	0	

Starts	6
Poles	0
Front Row	0
Wins	0
Top 5	0
Top 10	1
Retired	3

=== FIA World Drivers' Championship results ===
(key)

Year	Entrant	Chassis	Engine	1	2	3	4	5	6	7	8	9	WDC	Pts
1950	Indianapolis Race Cars	Maserati 8CL	Offenhauser 3.0 L4s	GBR	MON	500; 25	SUI	BEL	FRA	ITA			NC	0
1951	Blue Crown Spark Plug / Hopkins	Moore	Offenhauser 4.5 L4	SUI	500; 6	BEL	FRA	GBR	GER	ITA	ESP		NC	0
1952	Blue Crown Spark Plug / Hopkins	Lesovsky	Offenhauser 4.5 L4	SUI	500; 19	BEL	FRA	GBR	GER	NED	ITA		NC	0
1953	Hopkins / Motor Racers	Lesovsky	Offenhauser 4.5 L4	ARG	500; DNQ	NED	BEL	FRA	GBR	GER	SUI	ITA	NC	0
1954	Hopkins / Motor Racers	Lesovsky	Offenhauser 4.5 L4	ARG	500; DNQ	BEL	FRA	GBR	GER	SUI	ITA	ESP	NC	0
