= Ulrich Bigalke =

German racing driver (1910–40)

- Born: Ulrich Bigalke; 1 July 1910 Essen, Germany
- Died: 12 August 1940 (aged 30) over England

Ulrich "Ulli" Bigalke (1 July 1910 – 12 August 1940) was a German racing driver, engineer, and film-maker, whose career lasted from 1934 to 1939.

== Racing career ==
Born in Essen, Bigalke studied in Berlin-Charlottenburg for an engineering's degree. In 1934, he entered a 2000km rally in a 1 litre Fiat Balilla, and won. This brought him to the attention of Auto Union, and he was recruited as an assistant to manager Willy Walb and test driver, as well as occasional sportscar racer.

At the 1937 Vanderbilt Cup, he made test runs to warm up the cars, and demonstrated such a turn of speed that he was promoted to reserve driver in 1938. He took part in practice for the 1938 French Grand Prix and the 1939 Belgrade Grand Prix, the last race before the Second World War, being used at the latter to clear a fuel feed issue with one of the Auto-Unions. Despite Auto Union designer Robert Eberan-Eberhorst believing Bigalke had a "huge talent", he only raced once, in the 1939 Eifelrennen. He finished 6th, generally the slowest of the Silberpfeile drivers, taking a cautious approach in the wet conditions to guarantee a finish; he was one place ahead of H. P. Müller, who had problems with damp sparkplugs.

== Film-making ==
A hobbyist photographer, Bigalke added to his Auto Union duties that of film-making; he produced two documentary films about the team's racing activities in 1936 and 1937.

== Death ==
Bigalke joined the Luftwaffe at the start of the War, and died on 12 August 1940, during the Battle of Britain, when he was shot down in his Junkers Ju 88 over southern England. His body was swept back across the English Channel and he was buried on the German coast on 1 September.

== Filmography ==
- Zwischen Sahara und Nürburgring (1936)
- Deutsche Siege in drei Erdteilen (1937)
