= List of American open-wheel racing national champions =

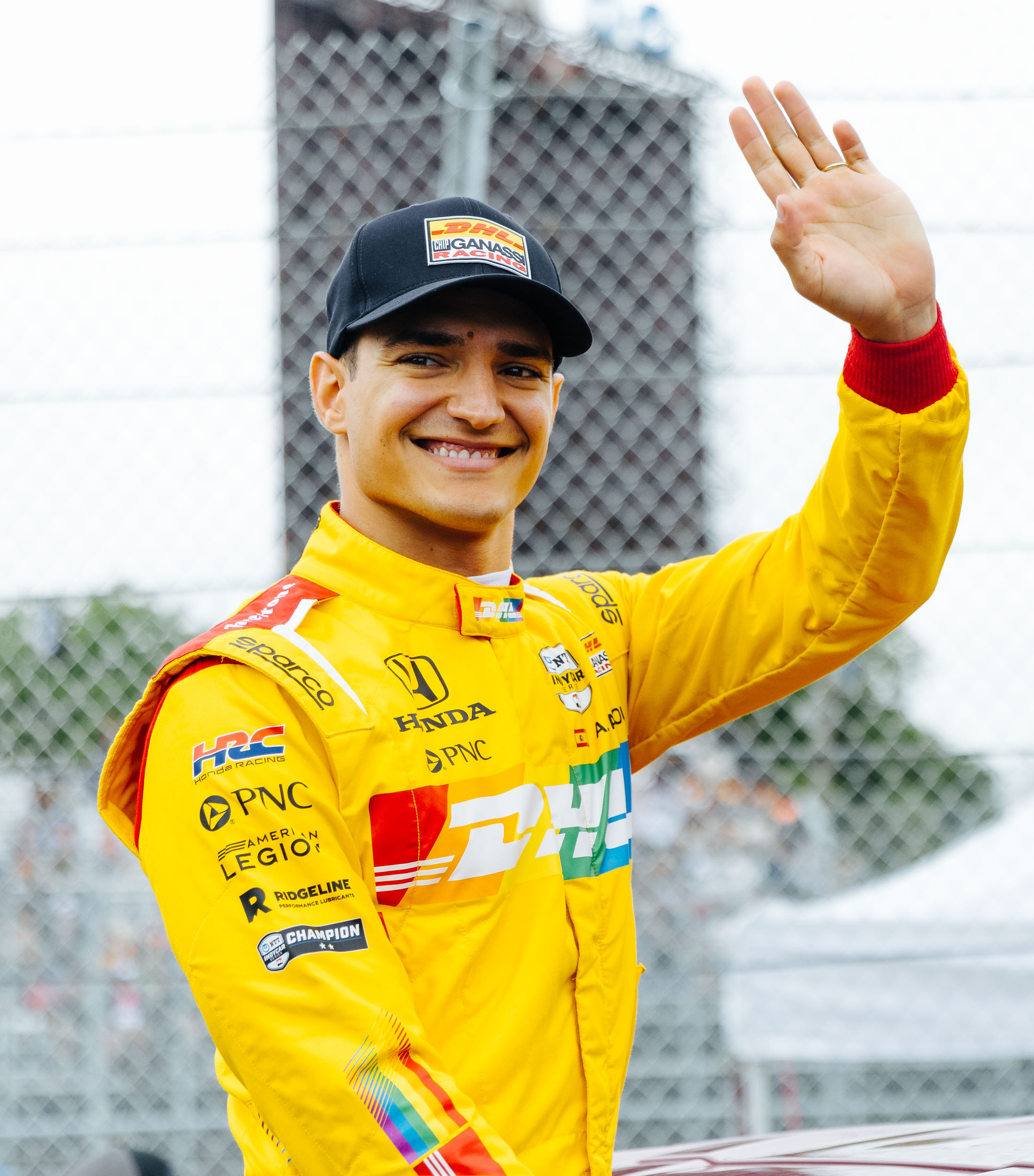
Álex Palou, the five-time and current National Champion.

American open-wheel car racing is the highest form of professional formula racing for single-seater open-wheel cars in North America. The sport was administered by the American Automobile Association (AAA) in 1905 until 1955 when the United States Auto Club (USAC) ran open-wheel racing starting from 1956 after the AAA dissolved its Contest Board in the wake of the 1955 Le Mans disaster and the fatal accident of driver Bill Vukovich.

USAC remained the sole governing body until 1979 when a group of disenchanted race team owners established the Championship Auto Racing Teams (CART) series, which would later become the dominant American open-wheel series by 1982. Despite this however, USAC would still sanction the Indy 500 until 1997, and would hold races outside the Indy 500 under the USAC Gold Crown championship from the 1981–82 season until the 1983–84 season, after which the USAC Gold Crown would consist of only the Indy 500 from the 1984–85 season until the 1994–95 season when the USAC Gold Crown was discontinued following the formation of the Indy Racing League (IRL). USAC would sanction the IRL until they were removed from their position by the IRL following a scoring error at the 1997 True Value 500, after which they would not sanction any American open-wheel races again. As a result the Indy 500 winner was also the USAC Gold Crown champion during those seasons.

A disagreement between CART and Indianapolis Motor Speedway president Tony George resulted in the establishment of the IRL in 1996 and the series rivalled CART before the latter went bankrupt in 2003 and was renamed the Champ Car World Series (CCWS) in 2004. The CCWS and the IRL merged in February 2008 to unify American open-wheel car racing and the merged body has run the sport under the IndyCar Series name since then.

The season consists of a series of races held variously on permanent road courses, closed city streets and oval tracks, usually in the United States and in a few cases abroad. The Drivers' Championship is presented to the most successful open-wheel driver over the course of the season through a points system based on individual race results. The Drivers' Championship is won when it is no longer mathematically possible for another competitor to overtake their points total regardless of the outcome of the remaining races, although is not officially awarded until the Victory Lap Celebration banquet that takes place after the season has ended. The winning driver and team owner are presented with a replica of the sterling silver Astor Cup and the driver's name is laser-etched into three black granite bases that support the permanent trophy on display in the Indianapolis Motor Speedway Museum.

As of 2026, 67 drivers from 11 different countries have won a national American open-wheel championship. (Note: In 1927, AAA Contest Board members Arthur Means and Val Haresnape retrospectively named Bert Dingley (1909), Ray Harroun (1910), Ralph Mulford (1911), Ralph DePalma (1912), Earl Cooper (1913), DePalma (1914), Cooper (1915), Cooper (1917), Mulford (1918), and Howdy Wilcox (1919) as AAA national champions. Means and Haresnape also attempted to retroactively add six events to the five-race 1920 season, and declared that Tommy Milton, instead of Gaston Chevrolet, was the 1920 AAA champion. In 1951, sportswriter Russ Caitlin deemed Harry Harkness (1902), Barney Oldfield (1903), George Heath (1904), Victor Hémery (1905), Joe Tracy (1906), Eddie Bald (1907), and Lewis Strang (1908) as AAA national champions. Disagreeing with Means and Haresnape, Catlin named George Robertson instead of Dingley to have been the 1909 champion. Catlin is not believed to have been aware of Oldfield's official 1905 AAA national championship. Accredited historians and statisticians do not consider the changes made by Means, Haresnape, and Catlin to be official.) The first national American open-wheel champion was Barney Oldfield in the 1905 AAA Championship Car season, and the current national title holder is Álex Palou in the 2026 IndyCar Series. A. J. Foyt holds the record for the most Drivers' Championships, having won the title on seven occasions. Scott Dixon is second with six titles, and Álex Palou is third with five titles. Sébastien Bourdais and Álex Palou both jointly hold the record for the most consecutive Drivers' Championships with four championships won between 2004 and 2007 for Bourdais, and 2023 and 2026 for Palou. Sébastien Bourdais is also the record holder for the most overall CART/CCWS titles. Louis Meyer and Ted Horn hold the record for the most AAA titles, having won the sanctioning body's championship three times. Foyt was the most successful competitor of the USAC era with seven series titles. Dixon is the most successful driver in the IndyCar Series with six series championships. As of 2026,Nigel Mansell remains the only driver to simultaneously hold both the Formula 1 World Championship and CART/IndyCar Championship doing so in 1993.

== Key ==
Series abbreviations
AAA	American Automobile Association
CART	Championship Auto Racing Teams
CCWS	Champ Car World Series
ICS	IndyCar Series
IRL	Indy Racing League
USAC	United States Auto Club

Tyre manufacturers
Symbol	Tyre manufacturer
B	Bridgestone
G	Goodyear
F	Firestone

Key
*	Driver is not recognized as a national champion

== By season ==
Drivers' Champions by season
Season	Series	Driver	Team	Car		Tire	Poles	Wins	Podiums	Points	Margin
Season	Series	Driver	Team	Chassis	Engine	Tire	Poles	Wins	Podiums	Points	Margin
1905	AAA	Barney Oldfield (USA)	Peerless	Peerless	Peerless	N/A	3	6	7	26	13
1906–1915	Not held										
1916	AAA	Dario Resta (GBR)	Peugeot Auto Import	Peugeot	Peugeot	N/A	0	5	5	4100	660
1917–1919	Not held because of World War I										
1920	AAA	Gaston Chevrolet (USA)	William Small Company	Frontenac	Frontenac	N/A	0	1	1	1030	100
1921	AAA	Tommy Milton (USA)	Louis Chevrolet	Frontenac	Frontenac	N/A	2	3	10	2230	250
1921	AAA	Tommy Milton (USA)	Cliff Durant	Miller	Miller	N/A	2	3	10	2230	250
1921	AAA	Tommy Milton (USA)	Edward A Hearne	Duesenberg	Duesenberg	N/A	2	3	10	2230	250
1922	AAA	Jimmy Murphy (USA)	Duesenberg Bros	Duesenberg	Duesenberg	N/A	5	7	14	3420	1510
1922	AAA	Jimmy Murphy (USA)	Jimmy Murphy	Duesenberg	Miller	N/A	5	7	14	3420	1510
1922	AAA	Jimmy Murphy (USA)	Cliff Durant	Miller	Miller	N/A	5	7	14	3420	1510
1923	AAA	Eddie Hearne (USA)	Cliff Durant	Miller	Miller	N/A	0	2	6	1882	532
1924	AAA	Jimmy Murphy (USA)	Jimmy Murphy	Miller	Miller	N/A	1	3	4	1595	355
1925	AAA	Pete DePaolo (USA)	Duesenberg Bros	Duesenberg	Duesenberg	N/A	2	5	7	3260	1515
1926	AAA	Harry Hartz (USA)	Harry Hartz	Miller	Miller	N/A	3	5	15	2954	1124
1927	AAA	Pete DePaolo (USA)	Pete DePaolo	Miller FD	Miller	N/A	0	3	9	1440	400
1927	AAA	Pete DePaolo (USA)	Cooper Engineering Company	Cooper	Miller	N/A	0	3	9	1440	400
1927	AAA	Pete DePaolo (USA)	Anthony Gulotta	Miller	Miller	N/A	0	3	9	1440	400
1928	AAA	Louis Meyer (USA)	Alden Sampson II	Miller	Miller	N/A	0	2	3	1596	681
1928	AAA	Louis Meyer (USA)	JR Burgamy	Miller	Miller	N/A	0	2	3	1596	681
1929	AAA	Louis Meyer (USA)	Alden Sampson II	Miller	Miller	N/A	0	2	4	1330	330
1930	AAA	Billy Arnold (USA)	Harry Hartz	Summers FD	Miller	N/A	4	3	3	1027.5	374.5
1930	AAA	Billy Arnold (USA)	Thomas J Mulligan	Ford T	Fronty Ford	N/A	4	3	3	1027.5	374.5
1930	AAA	Billy Arnold (USA)	Peter de Paolo	Duesenberg	Duesenberg	N/A	4	3	3	1027.5	374.5
1930	AAA	Billy Arnold (USA)	Louis F Schneider	Stevens	Miller	N/A	4	3	3	1027.5	374.5
1931	AAA	Louis Schneider (USA)	B. L. Schneider	Stevens	Miller	N/A	0	1	1	712.5	172.5
1932	AAA	Bob Carey (USA)	Louis Meyer	Stevens	Miller	N/A	1	2	3	815	105
1933	AAA	Louis Meyer (USA)	Louis Meyer	Miller	Miller	N/A	0	1	1	610	80
1934	AAA	Bill Cummings (USA)	H. C. Henning	Miller FD	Miller	N/A	2	1	1	681.7	151.7
1934	AAA	Bill Cummings (USA)	Peter de Paolo	Duesenberg	Miller	N/A	2	1	1	681.7	151.7
1935	AAA	Kelly Petillo (USA)	Kelly Petillo	Wetteroth	Offenhauser	N/A	1	3	3	890	260
1936	AAA	Mauri Rose (USA)	Four Wheel Drive Auto Company	Miller 4D	Miller	F	0	1	1	610	11
1936	AAA	Mauri Rose (USA)	Lou Moore	Miller	Offenhauser	F	0	1	1	610	11
1937	AAA	Wilbur Shaw (USA)	Wilbur Shaw	Shaw	Offenhauser	F	0	1	1	1135	385
1937	AAA	Wilbur Shaw (USA)	Enzo Fiermonte	Maserati V8RI	Maserati	N/A	0	1	1	1135	385
1938	AAA	Floyd Roberts (USA)	Lou Moore	Wetteroth	Miller	F	0	1	1	1000	175
1939	AAA	Wilbur Shaw (USA)	Boyle Racing Headquarters	Maserati 8CTF	Maserati	F	0	1	1	1000	175
1940	AAA	Rex Mays (USA)	Bowes Racing	Stevens	Winfield	N/A	3	3	3	1225	225
1941	AAA	Rex Mays (USA)	Bowes Racing	Stevens	Winfield	N/A	2	3	3	1225	550
1942–1945	Not held because of World War II										
1946	AAA	Ted Horn (USA)	Boyle Racing Headquarters	Maserati 8CTF	Maserati	F	0	0	3	1360	100
1946	AAA	Ted Horn (USA)	Fred A Peters	Wetteroth	Offenhauser	N/A	0	0	3	1360	100
1947	AAA	Ted Horn (USA)	HC Henning	Maserati 8CTF	Maserati	F	1	3	6	1920	310
1947	AAA	Ted Horn (USA)	Ted Horn Enterprises	Horn	Offenhauser	N/A	1	3	6	1920	310
1948	AAA	Ted Horn (USA)	HC Henning	Maserati 8CTF	Maserati	F	1	2	7	1880	721
1948	AAA	Ted Horn (USA)	Ted Horn Enterprises	Horn	Offenhauser	N/A	1	2	7	1880	721
1949	AAA	Johnnie Parsons (USA)	Kurtis Kraft	Kurtis	Offenhauser	N/A	0	5	7	2280	490
1950	AAA	Henry Banks (USA)	Indianapolis Race Cars	Maserati	Offenhauser	F	0	1	5	1390	73
1950	AAA	Henry Banks (USA)	Lou Moore	Moore	Offenhauser	N/A	0	1	5	1390	73
1951	AAA	Tony Bettenhausen (USA)	Rotary Engineering	Diedt FD	Offenhauser	F	4	8	10	2556	699.4
1951	AAA	Tony Bettenhausen (USA)	Murrell Belanger	Kurtis	Offenhauser	N/A	4	8	10	2556	699.4
1952	AAA	Chuck Stevenson (USA)	Bessie Lee Paoli	Kurtis KK4000	Offenhauser	N/A	0	2	4	1440	30
1953	AAA	Sam Hanks (USA)	Ed Walsh	Kurtis KK4000	Offenhauser	N/A	0	2	6	1659.5	409.5
1953	AAA	Sam Hanks (USA)	Lindsey Hopkins Racing	Kurtis KK4000	Offenhauser	N/A	0	2	6	1659.5	409.5
1954	AAA	Jimmy Bryan (USA)	Dean Van Lines Racing	Kuzma	Offenhauser	N/A	1	5	9	2630	1,340
1955	AAA	Bob Sweikert (USA)	John Zink	Kurtis KK500D	Offenhauser	F	4	2	7	2290	810
1955	AAA	Bob Sweikert (USA)	John Zink	Watson	Offenhauser	N/A	4	2	7	2290	810
1956	USAC	Jimmy Bryan (USA)	Dean Van Lines Racing	Kuzma	Offenhauser	N/A	0	4	7	1860	360
1957	USAC	Jimmy Bryan (USA)	Dean Van Lines Racing	Kuzma	Offenhauser	N/A	2	2	5	1650	180
1958	USAC	Tony Bettenhausen (USA)	Wiggers/Wright Racing	Kurtis KK4000	Offenhauser	N/A	0	0	6	1830	190
1958	USAC	Tony Bettenhausen (USA)	Wiggers/Wright Racing	Epperly	Offenhauser	F	0	0	6	1830	190
1958	USAC	Tony Bettenhausen (USA)	John Zink Racing	Watson	Offenhauser	N/A	0	0	6	1830	190
1959	USAC	Rodger Ward (USA)	Leader Card Racers	Watson	Offenhauser	N/A	1	4	8	2400	970
1960	USAC	A. J. Foyt (USA)	Bignotti-Bowes Racing	Kurtis	Offenhauser	N/A	0	4	8	1680	290
1960	USAC	A. J. Foyt (USA)	Bignotti-Bowes Racing	Meskowski	Offenhauser	N/A	0	4	8	1680	290
1961	USAC	A. J. Foyt (USA)	Bignotti-Bowes Racing	Kurtis	Offenhauser	N/A	1	4	6	2150	390
1961	USAC	A. J. Foyt (USA)	Bignotti-Bowes Racing	Trevis	Offenhauser	N/A	1	4	6	2150	390
1961	USAC	A. J. Foyt (USA)	Bignotti-Bowes Racing	Meskowski	Offenhauser	N/A	1	4	6	2150	390
1962	USAC	Rodger Ward (USA)	Leader Card Racers	Watson	Offenhauser	N/A	0	4	5	2460	510
1963	USAC	A. J. Foyt (USA)	Ansted-Thompson Racing	Meskowski	Offenhauser	N/A	2	5	10	2950	740
1963	USAC	A. J. Foyt (USA)	Ansted-Thompson Racing	Trevis	Offenhauser	N/A	2	5	10	2950	740
1964	USAC	A. J. Foyt (USA)	Ansted-Thompson Racing	Watson	Offenhauser	N/A	2	10	10	2900	772
1964	USAC	A. J. Foyt (USA)	Ansted-Thompson Racing	Lotus RE	Ford	N/A	2	10	10	2900	772
1964	USAC	A. J. Foyt (USA)	Ansted-Thompson Racing	Meskowski	Offenhauser	N/A	2	10	10	2900	772
1964	USAC	A. J. Foyt (USA)	Ansted-Thompson Racing	Hailbrand	Offenhauser	N/A	2	10	10	2900	772
1965	USAC	Mario Andretti (USA)	Dean Van Lines Racing	Blum	Offenhauser	N/A	3	1	10	3110	610
1965	USAC	Mario Andretti (USA)	Dean Van Lines Racing	Brawner Hawk I	Ford	N/A	3	1	10	3110	610
1965	USAC	Mario Andretti (USA)	Dean Van Lines Racing	Kuzma	Offenhauser	N/A	3	1	10	3110	610
1966	USAC	Mario Andretti (USA)	Dean Van Lines Racing	Brawner Hawk I	Ford	N/A	9	8	9	3070	640
1966	USAC	Mario Andretti (USA)	Dean Van Lines Racing	Kuzma	Offenhauser	N/A	9	8	9	3070	640
1966	USAC	Mario Andretti (USA)	Jim Robbins	Vollstedt	Ford	N/A	9	8	9	3070	640
1967	USAC	A. J. Foyt (USA)	A. J. Foyt Enterprises	Lotus	Ford	N/A	0	5	8	3440	80
1967	USAC	A. J. Foyt (USA)	A. J. Foyt Enterprises	Coyote	Ford	N/A	0	5	8	3440	80
1967	USAC	A. J. Foyt (USA)	A. J. Foyt Enterprises	Eagle	Ford	N/A	0	5	8	3440	80
1967	USAC	A. J. Foyt (USA)	A. J. Foyt Enterprises	Meskowski	Offenhauser	N/A	0	5	8	3440	80
1968	USAC	Bobby Unser (USA)	Leader Card Racers	Eagle	Offenhauser	N/A	3	5	11	4330	11
1968	USAC	Bobby Unser (USA)	Leader Card Racers	Eagle	Ford	N/A	3	5	11	4330	11
1968	USAC	Bobby Unser (USA)	Leader Card Racers	Coyote	Ford	N/A	3	5	11	4330	11
1968	USAC	Bobby Unser (USA)	Leader Card Racers	Watson	Offenhauser	N/A	3	5	11	4330	11
1968	USAC	Bobby Unser (USA)	Bobby Unser	Unser	Chevrolet	N/A	3	5	11	4330	11
1969	USAC	Mario Andretti (USA)	STP Corporation	Brawner Hawk Mk III	Ford	N/A	5	9	13	5055	2425
1969	USAC	Mario Andretti (USA)	STP Corporation	King	Chevrolet	N/A	5	9	13	5055	2425
1969	USAC	Mario Andretti (USA)	STP Corporation	Kuzma	Offenhauser	N/A	5	9	13	5055	2425
1970	USAC	Al Unser (USA)	Vel's Parnelli Jones Racing	Colt 70	Ford	N/A	8	10	15	5130	2870
1970	USAC	Al Unser (USA)	Vel's Parnelli Jones Racing	King D	Ford	N/A	8	10	15	5130	2870
1971	USAC	Joe Leonard (USA)	Vel's Parnelli Jones Racing	Colt 70	Ford	F	0	1	5	3015	695
1971	USAC	Joe Leonard (USA)	Vel's Parnelli Jones Racing	Colt 71	Ford	F	0	1	5	3015	695
1972	USAC	Joe Leonard (USA)	Vel's Parnelli Jones Racing	Parnelli VPJ1	Offenhauser	F	0	3	5	3460	1260
1973	USAC	Roger McCluskey (USA)	Lindsey Hopkins Racing	McLaren M16B	Offenhauser	G	0	1	5	3705	1085
1974	USAC	Bobby Unser (USA)	All American Racers	Eagle 74	Offenhauser	G	2	4	10	4870	1220
1975	USAC	A. J. Foyt (USA)	A. J. Foyt Enterprises	Coyote	Ford	G	7	7	10	4920	2020
1976	USAC	Gordon Johncock (USA)	Patrick Racing	Wildcat Mk2	DGS	G	1	2	11	4240	20
1977	USAC	Tom Sneva (USA)	Penske Racing	McLaren M24	Ford	G	2	2	6	3965	935
1977	USAC	Tom Sneva (USA)	Penske Racing	McLaren M24	Offenhauser	G	2	2	6	3965	935
1977	USAC	Tom Sneva (USA)	Penske Racing	Penske PC-5	Ford	G	2	2	6	3965	935
1978	USAC	Tom Sneva (USA)	Penske Racing	Penske PC-6	Ford	N/A	7	0	10	4153	122
1979	CART	Rick Mears (USA)	Penske Racing	Penske PC-6	Ford	G	2	3	9	4060	240
1979	CART	Rick Mears (USA)	Penske Racing	Penske PC-7	Ford	G	2	3	9	4060	240
1979	USAC	A. J. Foyt (USA)	Gilmore Racing	Parnelli VPJ6C	Ford	N/A	5	5	6	3320	1550
1979	USAC	A. J. Foyt (USA)	Gilmore Racing	Coyote	Foyt	N/A	5	5	6	3320	1550
1980	CART	Johnny Rutherford (USA)	Chaparral Racing	Chaparral 2K	Ford	G	3	5	8	4723	1009
1980	USAC	Johnny Rutherford (USA)	Chaparral Racing	Chaparral 2K	Ford	G	2	5	5	2740	770
1981	CART	Rick Mears (USA)	Penske Racing	Penske PC-9B	Ford	G	2	6	8	304	129
1981–82	USAC	George Snider (USA)*	Gilmore Racing	Coyote	Ford	N/A	0	1	2	1395	80
1981–82	USAC	George Snider (USA)*	David LeFevre	N/A	N/A	N/A	0	1	2	1395	80
1981–82	USAC	George Snider (USA)*	Fletcher Racing	March 82C	Ford	G	0	1	2	1395	80
1982	CART	Rick Mears (USA)	Penske Racing	Penske PC-10	Ford	G	8	4	6	294	52
1982–83	USAC	Tom Sneva (USA)*	Bignotti-Cotter Racing	March 83C	Ford	G	0	1	1	1000	200
1983	CART	Al Unser (USA)	Penske Racing	Penske PC-11	Ford	G	0	1	6	151	5
1983–84	USAC	Rick Mears (USA)*	Penske Racing	March 84C	Ford	G	0	1	1	1000	200
1984	CART	Mario Andretti (USA)	Newman/Haas Racing	Lola T800	Ford	G	8	6	8	176	13
1985	USAC	Danny Sullivan (USA)*	Penske Racing	March 85C	Ford	G	0	1	1	1000	200
1985	CART	Al Unser (USA)	Penske Racing	March 85C	Ford	G	1	1	6	151	1
1986	USAC	Bobby Rahal (USA)*	Truesports	March 86C	Ford	G	0	1	1	1000	200
1986	CART	Bobby Rahal (USA)	Truesports	March 86C	Ford	G	2	6	8	179	8
1987	USAC	Al Unser (USA)*	Penske Racing	March 86C	Ford	G	0	1	1	1000	200
1987	CART	Bobby Rahal (USA)	Truesports	Lola T87/00	Ford	G	1	3	10	188	30
1988	USAC	Rick Mears (USA)*	Penske Racing	Penske PC-17	Ilmor	G	1	1	1	1000	200
1988	CART	Danny Sullivan (USA)	Penske Racing	Penske PC-17	Ilmor	G	9	4	7	182	33
1989	USAC	Emerson Fittipaldi (BRA)*	Patrick Racing	Penske PC-18	Ilmor	G	0	1	1	1000	200
1989	CART	Emerson Fittipaldi (BRA)	Patrick Racing	Penske PC-17	Chevrolet	G	4	5	8	196	10
1989	CART	Emerson Fittipaldi (BRA)	Patrick Racing	Penske PC-18-	Ilmor	G	4	5	8	196	10
1990	USAC	Arie Luyendyk (NED)*	Doug Shierson Racing	Lola T90/00	Ilmor	G	0	1	1	1000	200
1990	CART	Al Unser Jr. (USA)	Galles-Kraco Racing	Lola T90/00	Ilmor	G	1	6	10	210	29
1991	USAC	Rick Mears (USA)*	Penske Racing	Penske PC-20	Ilmor	G	1	1	1	1000	200
1991	CART	Michael Andretti (USA)	Newman/Haas Racing	Lola T91/00	Ilmor	G	8	8	11	234	34
1992	USAC	Al Unser Jr. (USA)*	Galles-Kraco Racing	Galmer G92	Ilmor	G	0	1	1	1000	200
1992	CART	Bobby Rahal (USA)	Rahal-Hogan Racing	Lola T92/00	Ilmor	G	3	4	10	196	4
1993	USAC	Emerson Fittipaldi (BRA)*	Penske Racing	Penske PC-22	Ilmor	G	1	1	1	1000	200
1993	CART	Nigel Mansell (GBR)	Newman/Haas Racing	Lola T93/00	Ford XB	G	7	5	10	191	8
1994	USAC	Al Unser Jr. (USA)*	Penske Racing	Penske PC-23	Mercedes-Benz	G	1	1	1	1000	200
1994	CART	Al Unser Jr. (USA)	Penske Racing	Penske PC-23	Ilmor	G	4	8	11	225	47
1994	CART	Al Unser Jr. (USA)	Penske Racing	Penske PC-23	Mercedes-Benz	G	4	8	11	225	47
1995	USAC	Jacques Villeneuve (CAN)*	Team Green	Reynard 95I	Ford XB	G	0	1	1	1000	200
1995	CART	Jacques Villeneuve (CAN)	Team Green	Reynard 95I	Ford XB	G	6	4	7	172	11
1996	IRL	Buzz Calkins (USA) (Note: Calkins and Sharp share the 1996 Indy Racing League title as the series had no tiebreaker rule in effect at the time.)	Bradley Motorsports	Reynard 95I	Ford XB	F	0	1	1	246	0
1996	IRL	Scott Sharp (USA)	A. J. Foyt Enterprises	Lola T95/00	Ford XB	G	0	0	1	246	0
1996	IRL	Scott Sharp (USA)	A. J. Foyt Enterprises	Lola T94/00	Ford XB	G	0	0	1	246	0
1996	CART	Jimmy Vasser (USA)	Chip Ganassi Racing	Reynard 96I	Honda	F	4	4	5	154	22
1996–97	IRL	Tony Stewart (USA)	Team Menard	Lola T95/00	Buick/Menard	F	4	1	2	278	6
1996–97	IRL	Tony Stewart (USA)	Team Menard	G-Force GF01	Oldsmobile Aurora	F	4	1	2	278	6
1997	CART	Alex Zanardi (ITA)	Chip Ganassi Racing	Reynard 97I	Honda	F	5	4	7	195	33
1998	IRL	Kenny Bräck (SWE)	A. J. Foyt Racing	Dallara IR-7	Oldsmobile Aurora	G	0	3	4	332	40
1998	CART	Alex Zanardi (ITA)	Chip Ganassi Racing	Reynard 98I	Honda	F	0	7	15	285	116
1999	IRL	Greg Ray (USA)	Team Menard	Dallara IR-7	Oldsmobile Aurora	F	4	3	5	293	37
1999	CART	Juan Pablo Montoya (COL) (Note: Montoya and Dario Franchitti ended the 1999 CART season with the same number of points, but Montoya was declared champion because he had won seven races to Franchitti's three.)	Chip Ganassi Racing	Reynard 99I	Honda	F	7	7	9	212	0
2000	IRL	Buddy Lazier (USA)	Hemelgarn Racing	Riley & Scott MkVII	Oldsmobile Aurora	F	1	2	5	290	18
2000	IRL	Buddy Lazier (USA)	Hemelgarn Racing	Dallara IR-00	Oldsmobile Aurora	F	1	2	5	290	18
2000	CART	Gil de Ferran (BRA)	Team Penske	Reynard 2KI	Honda	F	5	2	7	168	10
2001	IRL	Sam Hornish Jr. (USA)	Panther Racing	Dallara IR-00	Oldsmobile Aurora	F	2	3	10	503	105
2001	CART	Gil de Ferran (BRA)	Team Penske	Reynard 01I	Honda	F	4	2	8	199	36
2002	IRL	Sam Hornish Jr. (USA)	Panther Racing	Dallara IR-00	Chevrolet	F	2	5	10	531	20
2002	CART	Cristiano da Matta (BRA)	Newman/Haas Racing	Lola B02/00	Toyota	B	7	7	11	237	73
2003	ICS	Scott Dixon (NZL)	Chip Ganassi Racing	G-Force GF09	Toyota	F	5	3	8	507	18
2003	CART	Paul Tracy (CAN)	Team Player's	Lola B02/00	Ford–Cosworth	B	6	7	10	226	27
2004	ICS	Tony Kanaan (BRA)	Andretti Green Racing	Dallara IR-03	Honda	F	2	3	11	618	85
2004	CCWS	Sébastien Bourdais (FRA)	Newman/Haas Racing	Lola B02/00	Ford–Cosworth	B	8	7	10	369	28
2005	ICS	Dan Wheldon (GBR)	Andretti Green Racing	Dallara IR-03	Honda	F	0	6	9	628	80
2005	CCWS	Sébastien Bourdais (FRA)	Newman/Haas Racing	Lola B02/00	Ford–Cosworth	B	5	6	7	348	60
2006	ICS	Sam Hornish Jr. (USA) (Note: Hornish and Wheldon ended the 2006 IndyCar Series with the same number of points, but Hornish won the title by virtue of him having won four races to Wheldon's two.)	Team Penske	Dallara IR-03	Honda	F	4	4	7	475	0
2006	CCWS	Sébastien Bourdais (FRA)	Newman/Haas Racing	Lola B02/00	Ford–Cosworth	B	7	7	11	387	89
2007	ICS	Dario Franchitti (GBR)	Andretti Green Racing	Dallara IR-05	Honda	F	4	4	11	637	13
2007	CCWS	Sébastien Bourdais (FRA)	Newman/Haas/Lanigan Racing	Panoz DP01	Cosworth XFE	B	6	8	9	364	81
2008	ICS	Scott Dixon (NZL)	Chip Ganassi Racing	Dallara IR-05	Honda	F	7	6	12	646	17
2009	ICS	Dario Franchitti (GBR)	Chip Ganassi Racing	Dallara IR-05	Honda	F	5	5	9	616	11
2010	ICS	Dario Franchitti (GBR)	Chip Ganassi Racing	Dallara IR-05	Honda	F	2	3	10	602	5
2011	ICS	Dario Franchitti (GBR)	Chip Ganassi Racing	Dallara IR-05	Honda	F	2	4	9	573	18
2012	ICS	Ryan Hunter-Reay (USA)	Andretti Autosport	Dallara DW12	Chevrolet	F	0	4	6	468	3
2013	ICS	Scott Dixon (NZL)	Chip Ganassi Racing	Dallara DW12	Honda	F	2	4	6	577	27
2014	ICS	Will Power (AUS)	Team Penske	Dallara DW12	Chevrolet	F	4	3	7	671	62
2015	ICS	Scott Dixon (NZL) (Note: Dixon and Montoya finished the 2015 IndyCar Series with the same number of points with Dixon winning the title by virtue of achieving three victories to Montoya's two.)	Chip Ganassi Racing	Dallara DW12	Chevrolet	F	2	3	4	556	0
2016	ICS	Simon Pagenaud (FRA)	Team Penske	Dallara DW12	Chevrolet	F	7	5	8	659	127
2017	ICS	Josef Newgarden (USA)	Team Penske	Dallara DW12	Chevrolet	F	1	4	9	642	13
2018	ICS	Scott Dixon (NZL)	Chip Ganassi Racing	Dallara DW12	Honda	F	1	3	9	678	57
2019	ICS	Josef Newgarden (USA)	Team Penske	Dallara DW12	Chevrolet	F	2	4	7	641	25
2020	ICS	Scott Dixon (NZL)	Chip Ganassi Racing	Dallara DW12	Honda	F	0	4	7	537	16
2021	ICS	Álex Palou (ESP)	Chip Ganassi Racing	Dallara DW12	Honda	F	2	3	8	549	38
2022	ICS	Will Power (AUS)	Team Penske	Dallara DW12	Chevrolet	F	5	1	9	560	16
2023	ICS	Álex Palou (ESP)	Chip Ganassi Racing	Dallara DW12	Honda	F	2	5	10	656	78
2024	ICS	Álex Palou (ESP)	Chip Ganassi Racing	Dallara DW12	Honda	F	3	2	6	544	31
2025	ICS	Álex Palou (ESP)	Chip Ganassi Racing	Dallara DW12	Honda	F	6	8	13	711	196
2026	ICS	Álex Palou (ESP)	Chip Ganassi Racing	Dallara DW12	Honda	F	8	6	7	631	86
Season	Series	Driver	Team	Chassis	Engine	Tire	Poles	Wins	Podiums	Points	Margin
Season	Series	Driver	Team	Car		Tire	Poles	Wins	Podiums	Points	Margin

== By driver ==
Key
†	Indicates driver won the USAC Gold Crown Championship

Championship victories by driver
Driver	Wins	Years
A. J. Foyt	7	1960, 1961, 1963, 1964, 1967, 1975, 1979
**Scott Dixon**	6	2003, 2008, 2013, 2015, 2018, 2020
**Álex Palou**	5	2021, 2023, 2024, 2025, 2026
Mario Andretti	4	1965, 1966, 1969, 1984
Sébastien Bourdais	4	2004, 2005, 2006, 2007
Dario Franchitti	4	2007, 2009, 2010, 2011
Louis Meyer	3	1928, 1929, 1933
Ted Horn	3	1946, 1947, 1948
Jimmy Bryan	3	1954, 1956, 1957
Rick Mears†	3	1979, 1981, 1982
Al Unser†	3	1970, 1983, 1985
Bobby Rahal†	3	1986, 1987, 1992
Sam Hornish Jr.	3	2001, 2002, 2006
Jimmy Murphy	2	1922, 1924
Pete DePaolo	2	1925, 1927
Wilbur Shaw	2	1937, 1939
Rex Mays	2	1940, 1941
Tony Bettenhausen	2	1951, 1958
Rodger Ward	2	1959, 1962
Joe Leonard	2	1971, 1972
Bobby Unser	2	1968, 1974
Tom Sneva	2	1977, 1978
Johnny Rutherford	2	1980, 1980
Al Unser Jr.†	2	1990, 1994
Alex Zanardi	2	1997, 1998
Gil de Ferran	2	2000, 2001
**Josef Newgarden**	2	2017, 2019
**Will Power**	2	2014, 2022
Barney Oldfield	1	1905
Dario Resta	1	1916
Gaston Chevrolet	1	1920
Tommy Milton	1	1921
Eddie Hearne	1	1923
Harry Hartz	1	1926
Billy Arnold	1	1930
Louis Schneider	1	1931
Bob Carey	1	1932
Bill Cummings	1	1934
Kelly Petillo	1	1935
Mauri Rose	1	1936
Floyd Roberts	1	1938
Johnnie Parsons	1	1949
Henry Banks	1	1950
Chuck Stevenson	1	1952
Sam Hanks	1	1953
Bob Sweikert	1	1955
Roger McCluskey	1	1973
Gordon Johncock	1	1976
Danny Sullivan	1	1988
Emerson Fittipaldi	1	1989
Michael Andretti	1	1991
Nigel Mansell	1	1993
Jacques Villeneuve	1	1995
Buzz Calkins	1	1996
Scott Sharp	1	1996
Jimmy Vasser	1	1996
Tony Stewart	1	1996–97
Kenny Bräck	1	1998
Juan Pablo Montoya	1	1999
Greg Ray	1	1999
Buddy Lazier	1	2000
Cristiano da Matta	1	2002
Paul Tracy	1	2003
Tony Kanaan	1	2004
Dan Wheldon	1	2005
**Ryan Hunter-Reay**	1	2012
Simon Pagenaud	1	2016

Drivers in bold were entered in the 2025 IndyCar Series, either as a full-time entrant or solely in the year's edition of the Indianapolis 500.

== By driver nationality ==
Drivers Champions' by nationality
Country	Total	Drivers
United States	83	48
United Kingdom	7	4
New Zealand	6	1
France	5	2
Brazil	5	4
Spain	5	1
Italy	2	1
Canada	2	2
Australia	2	1
Sweden	1	1
Colombia	1	1

== Records ==
=== Consecutive championships ===
There have been 16 drivers who have won consecutive National Championships. Only A. J. Foyt has achieved the feat on two separate occasions.

Consecutive championships by driver
Wins	Driver	Seasons	Series
4	Sébastien Bourdais	2004–2007	CCWS
4	Álex Palou	2023-2026	ICS
3	Ted Horn	1946–1948	AAA
3	Dario Franchitti	2009–2011	ICS
2	Louis Meyer	1928–1929	AAA
2	Rex Mays	1940–1941	AAA
2	Jimmy Bryan	1956–1957	USAC
2	A. J. Foyt	1960–1961	USAC
2	A. J. Foyt	1963–1964	USAC
2	Mario Andretti	1965–1966	USAC
2	Joe Leonard	1971–1972	USAC
2	Tom Sneva	1977–1978	USAC
2	Rick Mears	1981–1982	CART
2	Bobby Rahal	1986–1987	CART
2	Alex Zanardi	1997–1998	CART
2	Gil de Ferran	2000–2001	CART
2	Sam Hornish Jr.	2001–2002	IRL

Drivers in bold were entered in the 2027 IndyCar Series.

== Bibliography ==
- Perkins, Kris (1993). IndyCar. London, England: Osprey Automotive. ISBN 1-85532-399-0 – via Internet Archive.
- Higham, Peter (1995). "IndyCar Championship". The Guinness Guide to International Motor Racing. London, England: Motorbooks International. ISBN 978-0-7603-0152-4 – via Internet Archive.
- Taube, Dave (1996). All About Motorsports: The Race Fan and Beginner's Complete Guide. Swanton, Ohio: Windmill Publishing. ISBN 0-9638358-0-7 – via Internet Archive.
- Gifford, Clive (2006). "Champ Cars and Indy Racing League". The Kingfisher Motorsports Encyclopedia. London, England: Kingfisher. ISBN 978-0-7534-1382-1 – via Internet Archive.
- Wilson, Ed, ed. (2013). "Indy Car Racing". The Sports Book: The Sports, The Rules, The Tactics, The Techniques (4th ed.). London, England: Dorling Kindersley. ISBN 978-1-4093-3508-5 – via Internet Archive.
- Whitaker, Sigur E. (2015). The Indy Car Wars: The 30 Year Fight for Control of American Open-Wheel Racing. North Carolina: McFarland and Company. ISBN 978-1-4766-1980-4.
