= Eugen Bjørnstad =

Norwegian racing driver (1902–92)

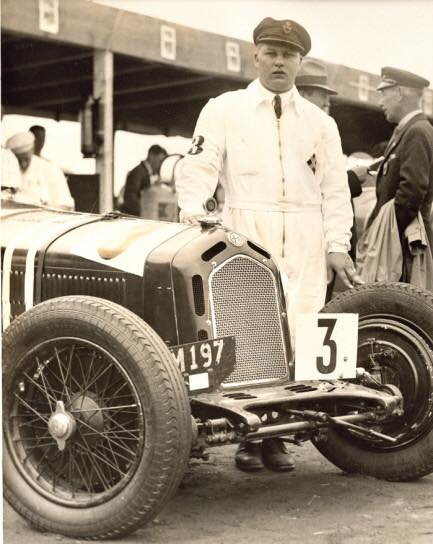
- With his Alfa 8C
- Born: Eugen Bjørnstad; 12 December 1909 Oslo, Norway
- Died: 13 August 1992 (aged 82) United States of America

Champ Car career
- 1 race run over 1 year
- Best finish: 40th (1937)
- First race: 1937 Vanderbilt Cup (Westbury)
- Last race: 1937 Vanderbilt Cup (Westbury)
Wins	Podiums	Poles
0	0	0

Eugen Bjørnstad (12 December 1909 – 13 August 1992) was a Norwegian Grand Prix driver, who was the first, and, as at 2026, only Norwegian to take part in an international formula Grand Prix.

== Career ==
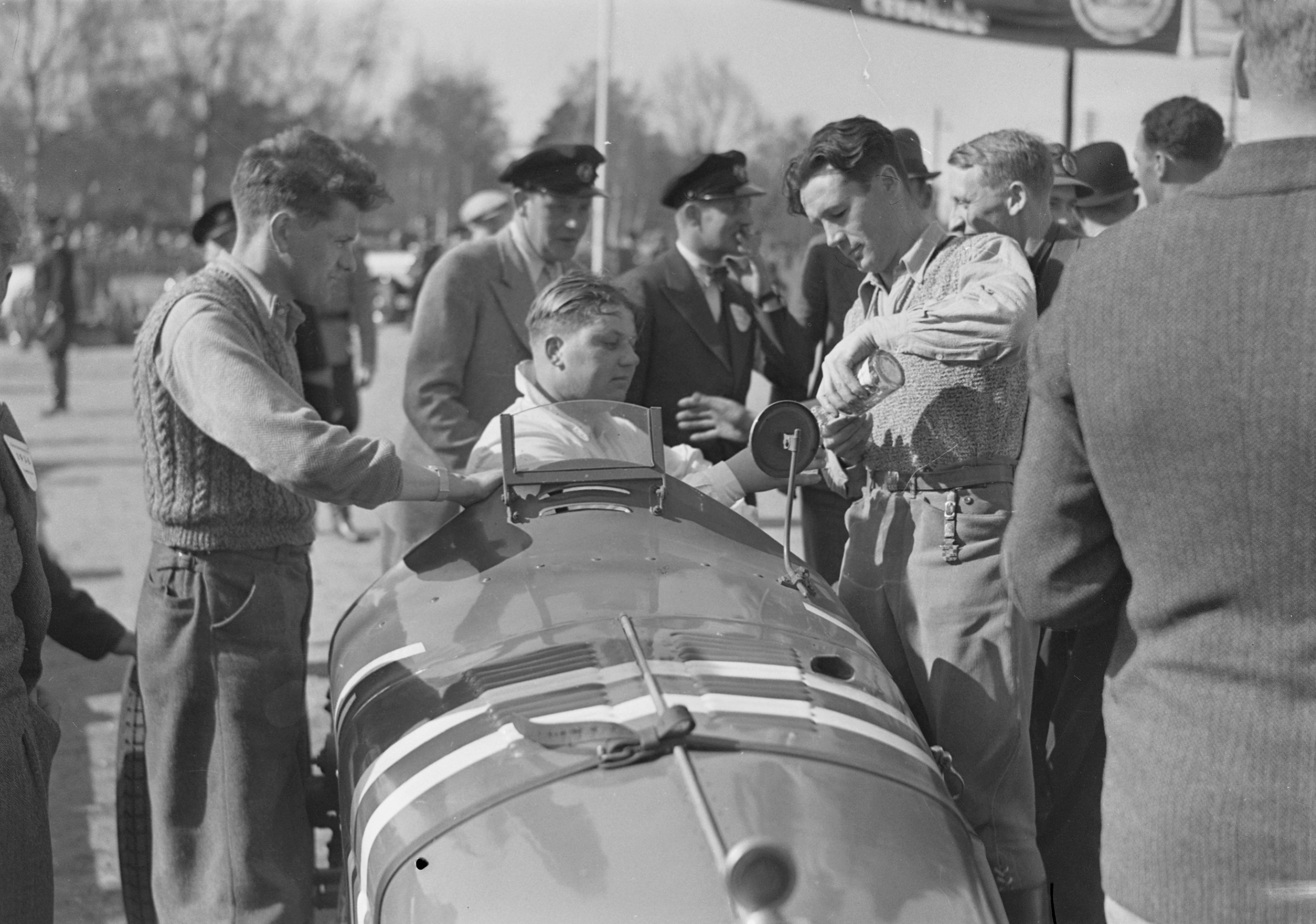
At the 1936 Finnish Grand Prix

Bjørnstad started racing on a motorcycle when he was 18, but soon switched to cars, with his parents fearing for his safety on two wheels. He originally made his name driving a Bugatti Type 35C, but in 1932 bought an Alfa Romeo 8C 2300 Monza, with which he became the leading Scandinavian racing driver. His successes included the 1934 and 1936 Finnish Grand Prix, and the 1936 Swedish Winter and Norwegian Grands Prix, both of which took place on ice circuits.

In 1933, Bjørnstad dipped his toe outside Scandinavia, taking the Alfa to the Lviv Grand Prix, and winning, thanks to adding an extra fuel tank to save time on refuelling. He tried his luck with the Alfa in a few other races, including two Grandes Eprueves; the 1934 Czech Grand Prix and 1937 Vanderbilt Cup, in the latter race sponsored by wealthy individuals who wanted to attract Norwegian ex-pats to the race. The more abrasive surface of the Roosevelt Raceway meant that Bjørnstad tried twin rear wheels in practice (an ice-racing practice). However he retired in both races.

He was prevented from starting the 1934 Spanish Grand Prix due to the Alfa being overweight. The Grand Prix formula at the time had a maximum weight limit, to cut down on engine sizes.

In 1937, having been impressed by the performance of Ian Connell in an E.R.A. at the Swedish Winter Grand Prix, Bjørnstad asked Connell to obtain one for him; Connell snagged the original R1A on its return from the 1936 Vanderbilt Cup. Bjørnstad's first race with it was at the voiturette Turin Grand Prix at the start of the season, and, despite a startline incident when he got entangled with another car, and spinning off on the second lap, Bjørnstad - "cannoning off everything" according to fellow competitor Reggie Tongue - came through to win.

However, financial reasons meant that 1937 was his last racing season. Connell re-possessed R1A (the car requiring £900 worth of repairs)and Bjørnstad gave up his car dealership to emigrate to the United States of America.
