= Lucky Teter =

American stunt driver (1901–1942)

- Born: Earl Moseman Teter; October 1, 1901 Noblesville, Indiana, U.S.
- Died: July 5, 1942 (aged 40) Indianapolis, Indiana, U.S.

Earl Moseman "Lucky" Teter (October 1, 1901 – July 5, 1942) was an American stunt driver, showman and entrepreneur. He pioneered and popularized the touring stunt driving show, performing across the country until his death in a car jumping stunt.

== Biography ==
Born in Noblesville, Indiana, Teter was a gas station attendant who, by 1932, was performing automobile and motorcycle stunts. "Lucky Teter and His Hell Drivers" performed across the United States and Canada beginning in 1936, and had great success for six years. His show was so popular that, in some years, he performed at the Canadian National Exhibition in Toronto in the afternoons, then flew to Syracuse, New York, to appear in the New York State Fair at night, which required two sets of equipment. He is credited with creating such now-staple stunts as jumping a car from ramp to ramp and rolling a car. He was also the first to team up with an automobile company, in his case Plymouth, promoting its products in exchange for backing.

Teter submitted entries for the 1936 Indianapolis 500 and the 1937 Vanderbilt Cup, but did not appear for either race. He also appeared in some documentary shorts and did some (uncredited) stunt driving for the 1936 film Speed, which featured James Stewart in his first starring role.

On July 5, 1942, Teter was the last performer at an Army Relief benefit at the Indiana State Fair Grounds. He planned to break his own world distance record by jumping 150 feet (46 m) over a transport truck. He drove a 1938 Plymouth at 65 miles per hour (105 km/h) and jumped off the first ramp, but came down several feet short and crashed into the supports of the landing ramp. He died in the ambulance taking him to the hospital. After his death, his widow sold the show to Joie Chitwood.

== Documentary ==
Teter was the subject of a 2011 documentary, Lucky Teter and His Hell Drivers.
