= Vanderbilt Cup =

American auto race

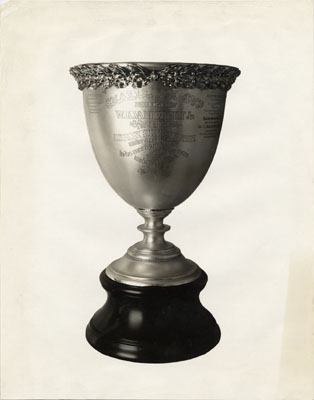
- Country: United States
- Inaugural season: 1904
- Folded: 1968

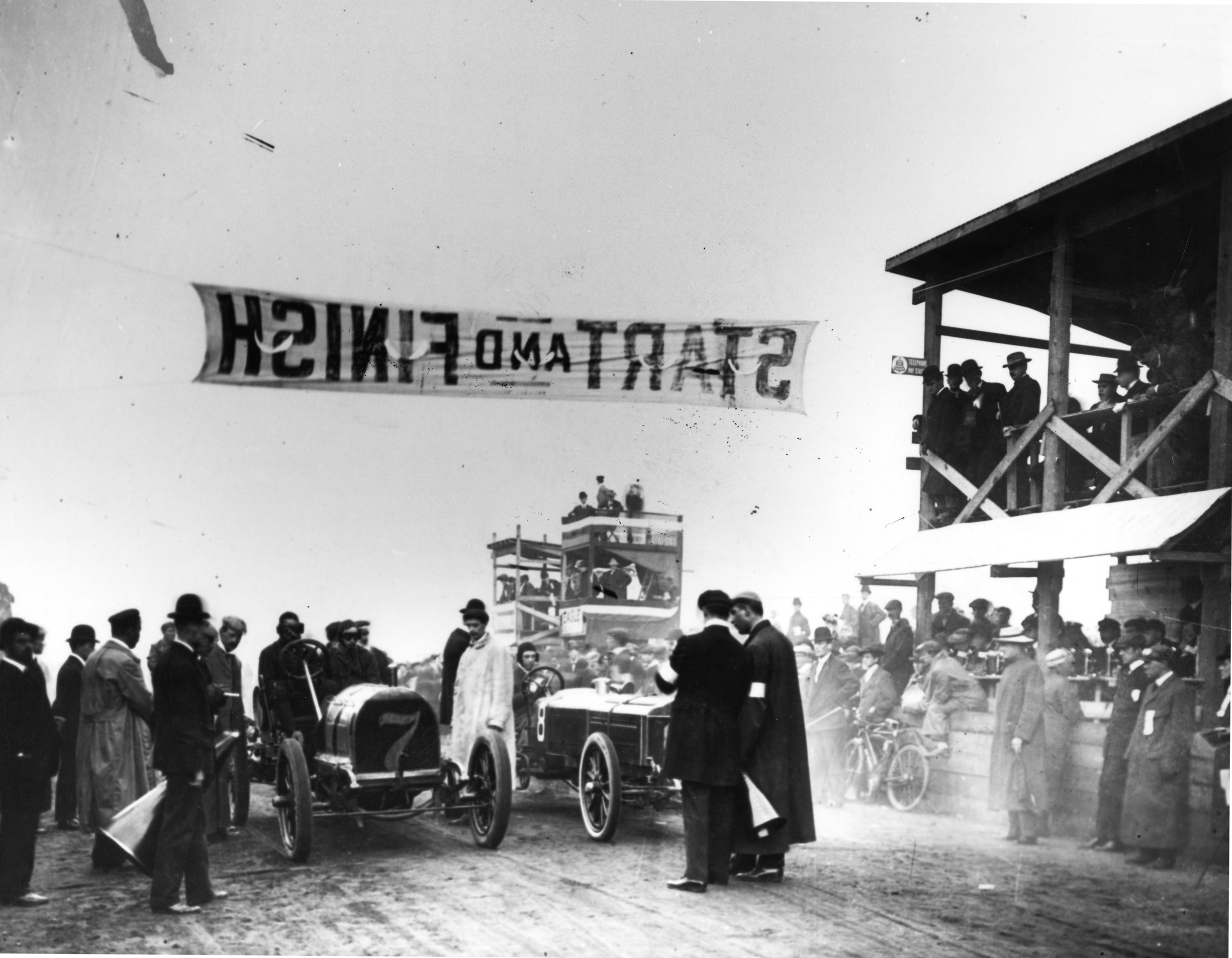
Vanderbilt Cup race start, 1905

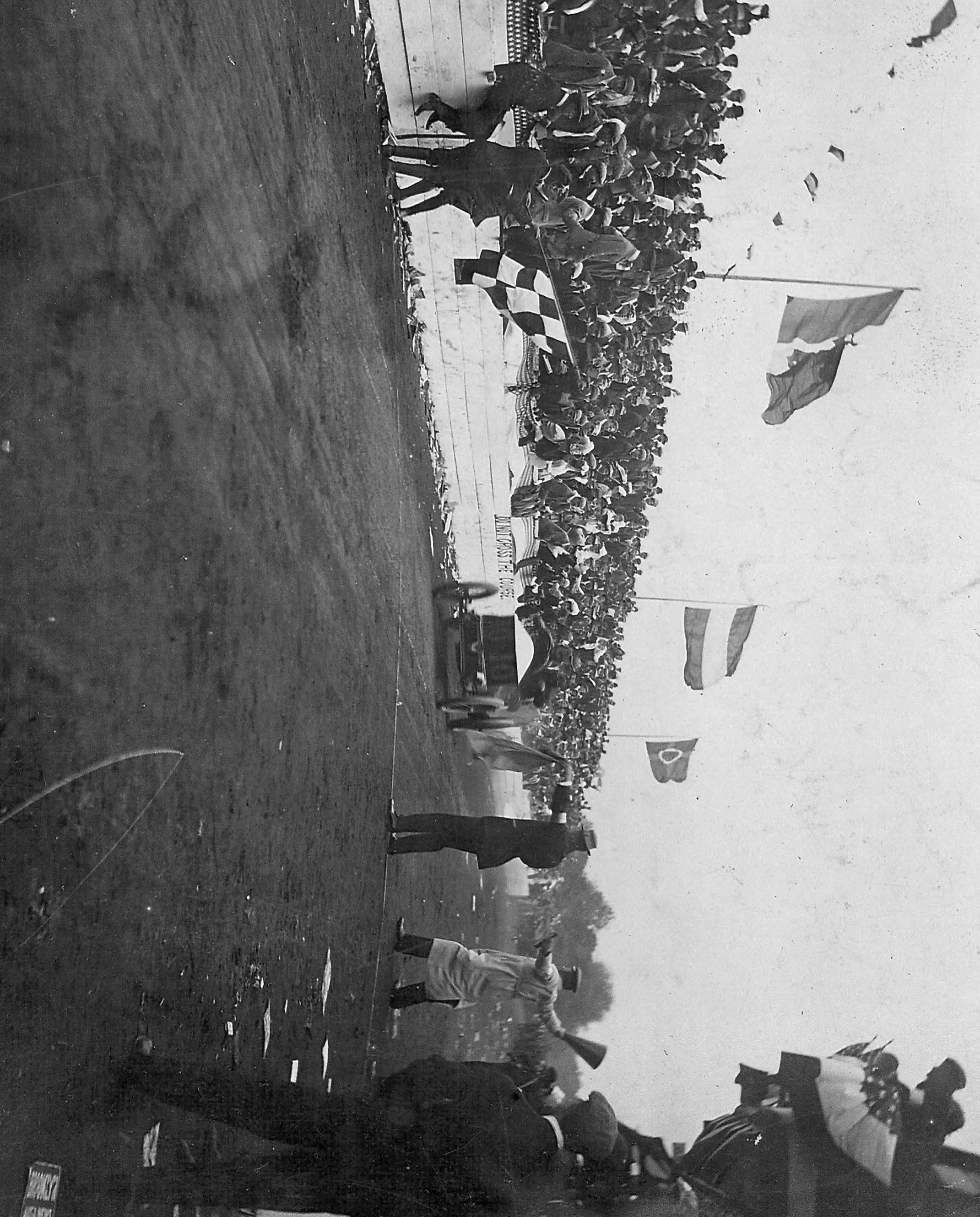
Vanderbilt Cup race finish, 1906

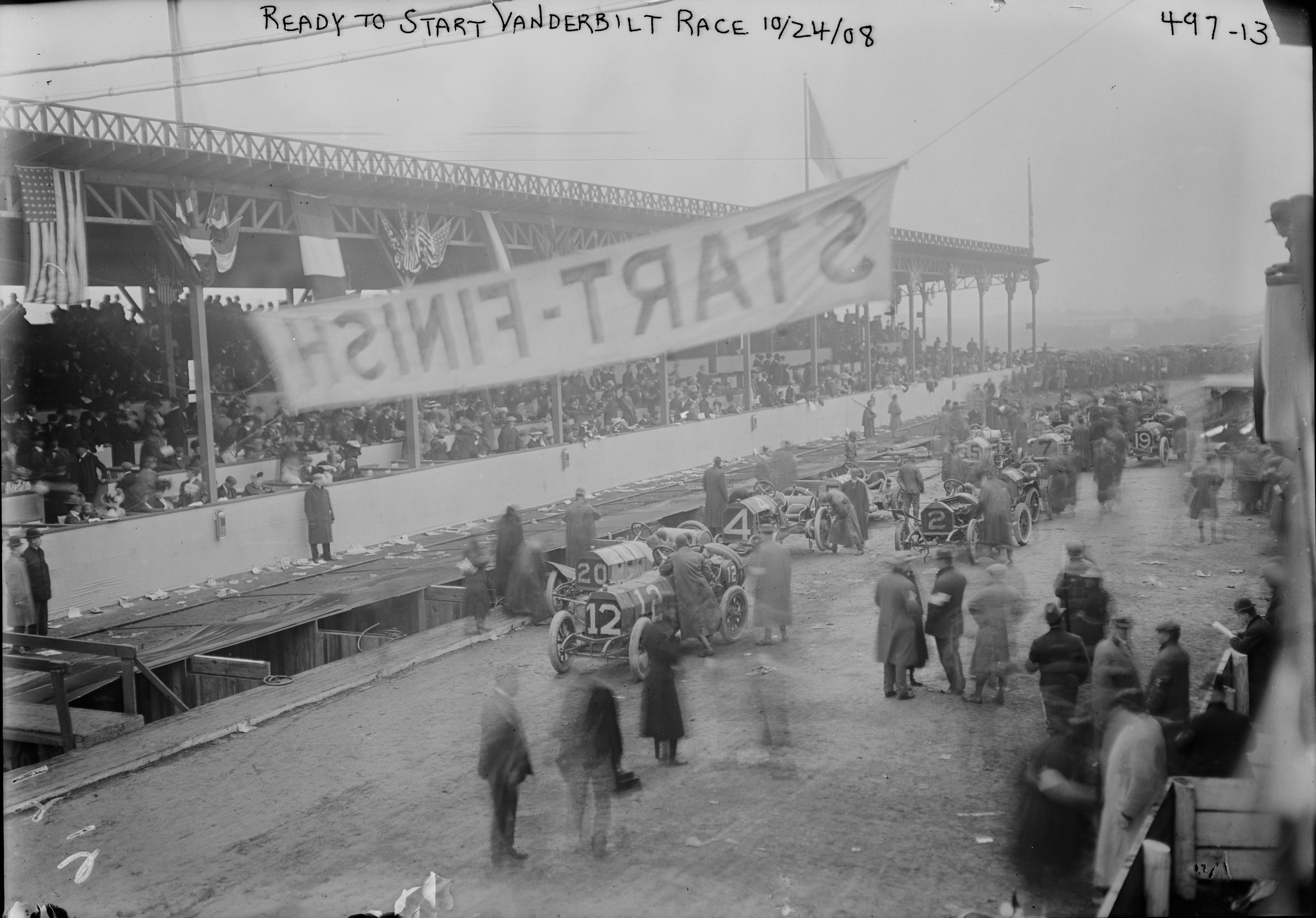
Vanderbilt Cup race start, 1908

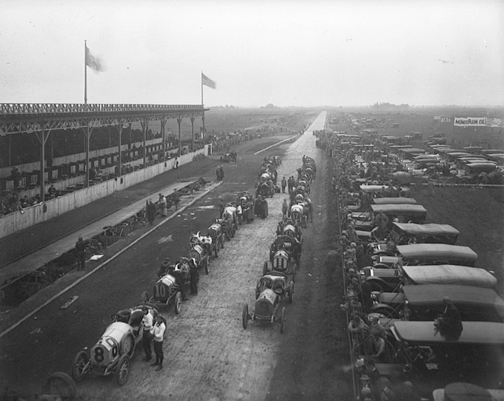
Vanderbilt Cup race start, 1910

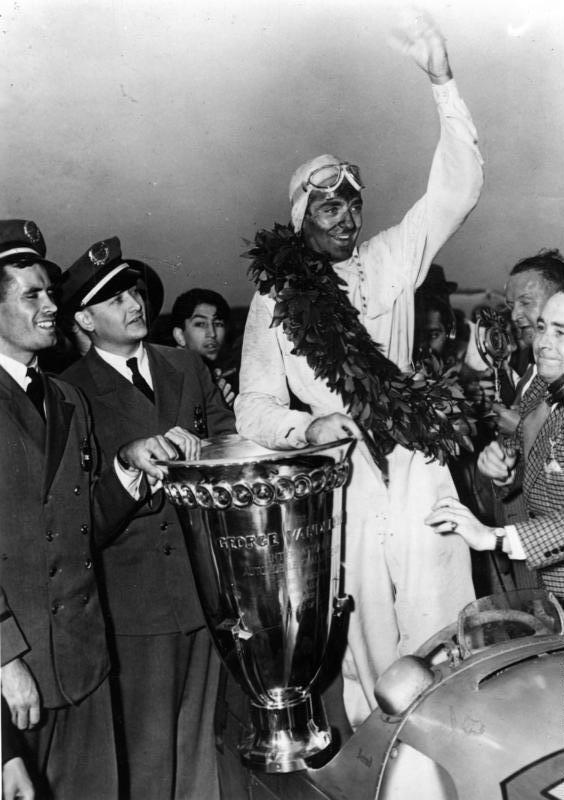
Bernd Rosemeyer with the George Vanderbilt Cup in 1937

The Vanderbilt Cup was the first major trophy in American auto racing.

== History ==
An international event, it was founded by William Kissam Vanderbilt II in 1904 and first held on October 8 on a course set out in Nassau County on Long Island, New York. The announcement that the race was to be held caused considerable controversy in New York, bringing a flood of legal actions in an attempt to stop the race. The politicians soon jumped in, holding public hearings on the issue. Vanderbilt prevailed and the inaugural race was run over a 30.24 miles (48.7 km) course of winding dirt roads through the Nassau County area.

Vanderbilt put up a large cash prize hoping to encourage American manufacturers to get into racing, a sport already well organized in Europe that was yielding many factory improvements to motor vehicle technology. The race drew the top drivers and their vehicles from across the Atlantic Ocean, some of whom had competed in Europe's Gordon Bennett Cup. The first Long Island race featured seventeen vehicles and the newspaper and poster art promotion drew large crowds hoping to see an American car defeat the mighty European vehicles. However, George Heath won the race in a Panhard and another French vehicle, a Darracq, took the Cup the next two years straight. Crowd control was a problem from the start and after a spectator, Curt Gruner, was killed in 1906, the race was cancelled. Meanwhile, in France, the first Grand Prix motor racing event had been run on June 26, 1906, under the auspices of the Automobile Club de France in Le Mans. One of the competitors was American Elliot Shepard, the son of Margaret Vanderbilt-Shepard and a cousin of William Kissam Vanderbilt.

Learning from his cousin about the success of the French Grand Prix and the rapid expansion of Grand Prix racing in other European countries, William Vanderbilt conceived a way to solve the safety issue as well as improve attendance to his race. Vanderbilt formed a company to build the Long Island Motor Parkway, one of the country's first modern paved parkways that could not only be used for the race but would open up Long Island for easy access and economic development. Construction began in 1907 of the multimillion-dollar toll highway, to run from the Kissena Corridor in Queens County over numerous bridges and overpasses to Lake Ronkonkoma, a distance of 48 miles (77 km). The 1908 race was held over parts of the new highway and much to the delight of the large crowd on hand, 23-year-old local hero George Robertson from Garden City, New York became the first American to win the event driving the American Locomobile, which was the company's first gas-powered car and designed by famed engineer Andrew L. Riker (built in Bridgeport, Connecticut) (in 1908, George Robertson (wearing #16) took the win in this car, ahead of fellow Locomobile pilot Joe Florida in third, becoming the first United States-built car to win in international competition).

The Vanderbilt Cup was held successfully on Long Island until 1911 when it was showcased at Savannah, Georgia in combination with the American Grand Prize. The next year it moved to a racecourse in Milwaukee, Wisconsin, then for three years in California: Santa Monica in 1914 and 1916, San Francisco in 1915. The race was canceled after the United States joined the Allies in World War I in 1917. Some of the drivers who participated in the Vanderbilt Cup became famous names, synonymous with automobiles and racing such as Louis Chevrolet, Vincenzo Lancia and Ralph DePalma.

The Vanderbilt Cup was not held again until 1936 when William Kissam Vanderbilt II's nephew, George Washington Vanderbilt III picked up the cause and sponsored a 300-mile (480 km) race at the new facilities at Roosevelt Raceway. Once again, the Europeans were enticed by the substantial prize money and Scuderia Ferrari entered three Alfa Romeo racers. A lack of American competition and a less-than-exciting course layout saw the race run for only two years, both won by Europeans.

== Trophies ==
The original Cup is cast of silver and measures 2.5 feet (0.76 m) in height. It bears the image of William K. Vanderbilt II driving his record-setting Mercedes at the Daytona Beach Road Course in 1904. The trophy today is stored at a Smithsonian Institution storage facility and is not available to be seen by the public.

The George Vanderbilt Cup is on display at Museo Nicolis in Verona.

== Race winners ==
Year	Winning driver	Car	Venue	Report
1904	(United States) George Heath	Panhard	Nassau County, New York	report
1905	(France) Victor Hémery	Darracq	Nassau County, New York	report
1906	(France) Louis Wagner	Darracq	Nassau County, New York	report
1907: Not held
1908	(United States) George Robertson	Locomobile	Long Island Motor Parkway	report
1909	(United States) Harry Grant	ALCO	Long Island Motor Parkway	report
1910	(United States) Harry Grant	ALCO	Long Island Motor Parkway	report
1911	(United States) Ralph Mulford	Lozier	Savannah, Georgia	report
1912	(United States) Ralph DePalma	Mercedes	Milwaukee, Wisconsin	report
1913: Not held
1914	(United States) Ralph DePalma	Schroeder-Mercedes	Santa Monica, California	report
1915	(United Kingdom) Dario Resta	Peugeot	San Francisco, California	report
1916	(United Kingdom) Dario Resta	Peugeot	Santa Monica, California	report
1917–1935: Not held
1936	(Italy) Tazio Nuvolari	Alfa Romeo	Roosevelt Raceway	report
1937	(Germany) Bernd Rosemeyer	Auto Union	Roosevelt Raceway	report

== 1960s attempted revivals ==
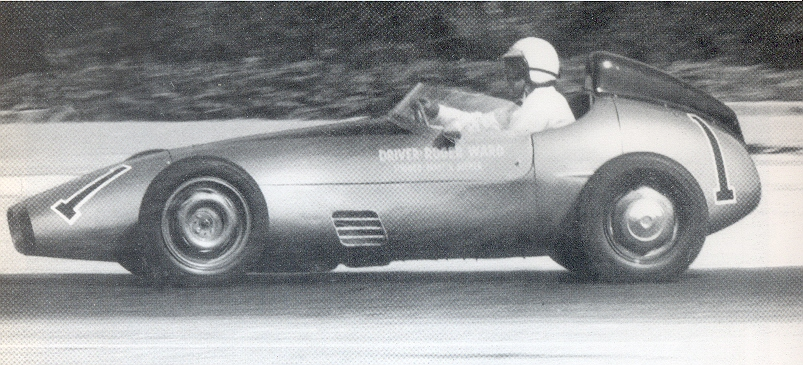
Rodger Ward, 1960

After the 1937 event, the Vanderbilt name would not return to the United States motor racing scene for more than twenty years. During the 1960s, in an attempt to "leverage the legacy" of the Vanderbilt Cup history and name, the Sports Car Club of America (SCCA) sanctioned several events featuring tertiary levels of competition, with the exception of the 1960 event, which drew two notable drivers: Jim Rathmann and Rodger Ward. Sponsored by Cornelius Vanderbilt IV, the 1960 race was run as a Formula Junior event and held again at Roosevelt Raceway. In 1965, 1967, and 1968, the Bridgehampton Sports Car Races were billed as the Vanderbilt Cup. Upon conclusion of the SCCA-sanctioned Bridgehampton event in 1968, the Vanderbilt Cup name disappeared for 28 years.

Year	Winning driver	Car	Venue	Report
1960	(United States) Harry Carter	Stanguellini Formula Junior	Roosevelt Raceway	report
1961–1964: Not held
1965	(United States) Jim Hall	Chaparral 2A-Chevrolet	Bridgehampton Race Circuit	report
1966: Not held
1967	(United States) Mark Donohue	Lola T70-Chevrolet	Bridgehampton Race Circuit	report
1968	(United States) Skip Scott	Lola T70-Chevrolet	Bridgehampton Race Circuit	report

== Revival trophy ==
In 1996, the sport of Indy car racing had become embroiled in a "Split" between Championship Auto Racing Teams (CART) and the Indy Racing League (IRL). Tony George, the owner of the Indianapolis Motor Speedway and the IRL, announced that the top 25 entries in IRL points standings would be guaranteed starting positions in the 1996 Indianapolis 500. That would leave only 8 "at-large" spots for the CART-based teams. On December 18, 1995 CART teams, convinced they were being deliberately locked out from the 1996 Indy 500, and the victims of a "power grab" by Tony George, announced their intentions to boycott that event. The owners, along with CART president and CEO Andrew Craig, jointly announced plans for a new race, the Inaugural U.S. 500, to be held at Michigan International Speedway the same day.

In an attempt to enhance the prestige of their new event and in recognition of William Kissam Vanderbilt's place in automotive racing history, CART had a facsimile of the original Vanderbilt Cup created as the winner's trophy for the 1996 U.S. 500. After only one running, the U.S. 500 on Memorial Day weekend was discontinued. The U.S. 500 name was instead used for the July race (formerly known as the Michigan 500).

After serving as the U.S. 500 winner's trophy through 1999, CART designated the Vanderbilt Cup as its series championship trophy in 2000. Names of U.S. 500 winners from 1996 to 1999, and the CART series champions from 2000 on-wards, were to be etched into the new Cup. Upon CART's demise in 2003 its successor, the Champ Car World Series (CCWS), continued using the Vanderbilt Cup copy.

After the bankruptcy of the CCWS in 2008 its assets were purchased by the IRL, unifying the most prestigious level of American open-wheel racing under a single sanctioning body. Tony George expressed an interest in having the Vanderbilt Cup copy replace the IRL's then-current Indy car National Champion's trophy, known as the Silver Cup. However, no change was made. Since the 2011 season the IRL - rebranded as the IndyCar Series since 2012 - has awarded National Champions the Astor Challenge Cup.

Year	Winning driver	Car	Report
U.S. 500
1996	(United States) Jimmy Vasser	Reynard-Honda	report
1997	(Italy) Alex Zanardi	Reynard-Honda	report
1998	(Canada) Greg Moore	Reynard-Mercedes	report
1999	(Brazil) Tony Kanaan	Reynard-Honda	report
CART/CCWS Season Championship
2000	(Brazil) Gil de Ferran	Reynard-Honda	report
2001	(Brazil) Gil de Ferran	Reynard-Honda	report
2002	(Brazil) Cristiano da Matta	Lola-Toyota	report
2003	(Canada) Paul Tracy	Lola-Ford	report
2004	(France) Sébastien Bourdais	Lola-Ford	report
2005	(France) Sébastien Bourdais	Lola-Ford	report
2006	(France) Sébastien Bourdais	Lola-Ford	report
2007	(France) Sébastien Bourdais	Panoz-Cosworth	report
