= James Weirick =

Australian academic

Professor James Weirick is an Australian academic who was the Director of the Master of Urban Development and Design (MUDD) program at the University of New South Wales (UNSW), Sydney, Australia. This program was last run in 2019.

Professor Weirick is well known as a world authority on Walter Burley Griffin and Marion Mahony Griffin, the architects who won the international competition to design the masterplan for Australia's capital, Canberra.

Prior to joining UNSW in 1991, Weirick was Head of Landscape Architecture at RMIT University (1988–91). He held academic positions at RMIT from 1987 to 1993. He was a lecturer in Landscape Architecture at Canberra College of Advanced Education (1982–1986). He has had various consultancies in Sydney, Melbourne and Canberra. Weirick holds a Master of Landscape Architecture from Harvard University.

== Selected publications ==
- Walker, M., Kabos, A. and Weirick, J. (1994) Building for nature : Walter Burley Griffin and Castlecrag, Castlecrag, N.S.W. : Walter Burley Griffin Society (ISBN 0-646-18133-5)
