= 1939 Finnish Grand Prix =

Eläintarha track profile, length 2,000 m (1.24 mi) (from 1933)

The 1939 Finnish Grand Prix was a Grand Prix motor race held at Eläintarharata on 7 May 1939.

The race had a limited field of competitors with only nine entries, three of whom failed to arrive for the event. The event was held on public roads and as permission was only granted to close the streets for race day, qualifying was held at 4am on Friday morning on a 400m section of the main straight. Each car did two runs with the best times used to assign grid positions. Race favourite Petre Cristea was not able to arrive until the Saturday so was not able to set a qualifying time.

== Classification ==
=== Qualifying ===
Pos	No	Driver	Vehicle	Time
1	2	(Finland) Aleksi Patama	Ford Special	14.9s
2	6	(Finland) Einar Alm	Ford	15.8s
5	3	(Finland) Walter Bergström	DKW Special	20.6s
3	1	(Romania) Petre Cristea	BMW 328	No Time
4	4	(Sweden) Tore Berg	Alfa Romeo 8C "Monza"	No Time
6	5	(Sweden) Adolf Westerblom	Alfa Romeo 8C "Monza"	No Time

=== Race ===
Pos	Driver	Car	Laps	Time/Retired
1	(Sweden) Adolf Westerblom	Alfa Romeo 8C Monza	25	28m56.0s
2	(Romania) Petre Cristea	BMW 328	25	+27.4s
3	(Finland) Aleksi Patama	Ford Special	25	+ 1m32.5s
4	(Finland) Walter Bergström	DKW Special	25	+ 7m27.0s
DNF	(Sweden) Tore Berg	Alfa Romeo 8C "Monza"	18	Brakes
DNS	(Finland) Einar Alm	Ford		DNS

Preceded by 1938 Finnish Grand Prix	Finnish Grand Prix; 1939	Succeeded by 1947 Finnish Grand Prix
