= 1932 Finnish Grand Prix =

Eläintarha track profile, length 2,034 m (1.26 mi) (1932)

The 1932 Finnish Grand Prix was a Grand Prix motor race held at Eläintarharata on 8 May 1932. It was the first Grand Prix ever held in Finland.

== Classification ==
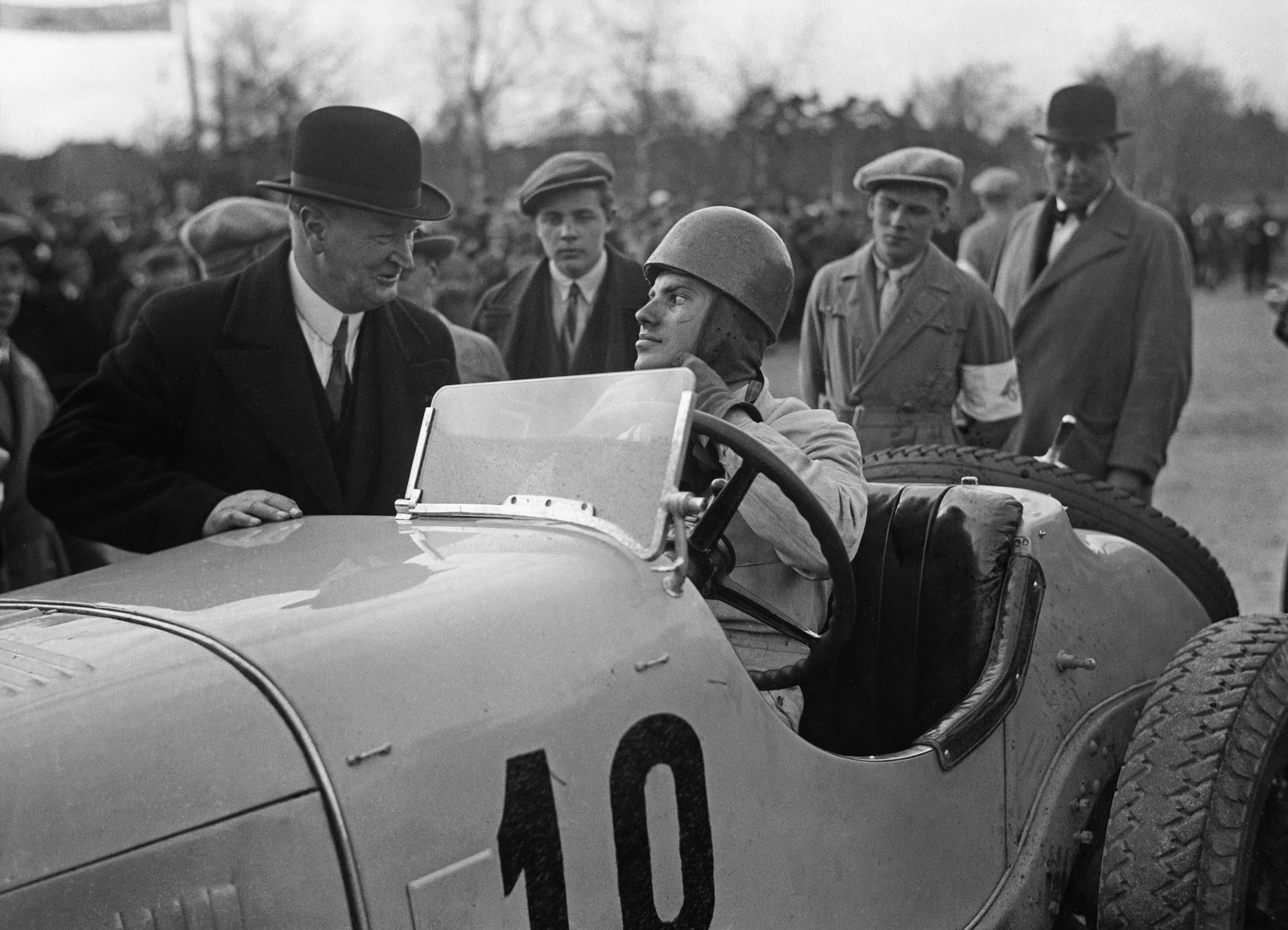
Per Viktor Widengren at the 1932 Finnish Grand Prix

Pos	Car Number	Driver	Car	Laps	Time/Retired
1	10	(Sweden) Per-Viktor Widengren	Mercedes-Benz SSK 7.1L	50	1:08:41.6
2	3	(Finland) S. P. J. Keinänen	Chrysler Special	50	+ 2:23.0
3	8	(Finland) Karl Ebb	Mercedes-Benz SSK 7.1L	50	+ 2:53.0
4	9	(Sweden) Knut G Sundstedt	Bugatti T35B	50	+ 3:22.6
5	1	(Finland) Asser Wallenius	Ford Special	50	+ 3:23.1
DNF	7	(Finland) Nikolai Nenonen	Delage	22	Gearbox
DNF	4	(Sweden) Ejnar Lindberg	Bugatti T43	17	Gearbox
DNF	6	(Finland) Johan Ramsey	Chrysler Special	10	
DNF	2	(Sweden) Harry Larsson	Ford Special	1	Radiator
DNS	5	(Sweden) Börje Dahlin	Amilcar	0	Clutch

Preceded by Event Established	Finnish Grand Prix; 1932	Succeeded by 1933 Finnish Grand Prix
