= Keimola Motor Stadium =

Former motor racing track in Vantaa, Finland

- Keimola track profile
- Location: Vantaa, Finland
- Coordinates: 60°19′10.24″N 24°49′51.72″E
- Broke ground: 1965
- Opened: 12 June 1966; 59 years ago
- Closed: 21 October 1978; 47 years ago
- Major events: European Rallycross Championship (1974–1978); Interserie (1970–1972); Formula Two (1966–1967)

Full Circuit (1966–1978)
- Length: 3.300 km (2.051 mi)
- Turns: 8
- Race lap record: 1:11.740 ( (Finland) Leo Kinnunen, Porsche 917/10 TC, 1972, Group 7)

The Keimola Motor Stadium (Finnish: Keimolan moottorirata, Swedish: Käinby Motorstadion) was a dedicated race track located in Vantaa, Finland. It was founded by Finnish racing driver Curt Lincoln after the closure of the Eläintarha track in 1963. Construction started in 1965 and the track was opened on 12 June 1966. The track was 3.300 km (2.051 mi) long, consisting of eight turns and a 1 km (0.62 mi) home straight. Multiple racing series, including Formula Two, Formula Vee and Interserie, raced on the track during the years it was used. After many years of financial difficulties, the track was abandoned in late 1978. For many years of decay, there are plans to transform it into a residential area.

== History ==
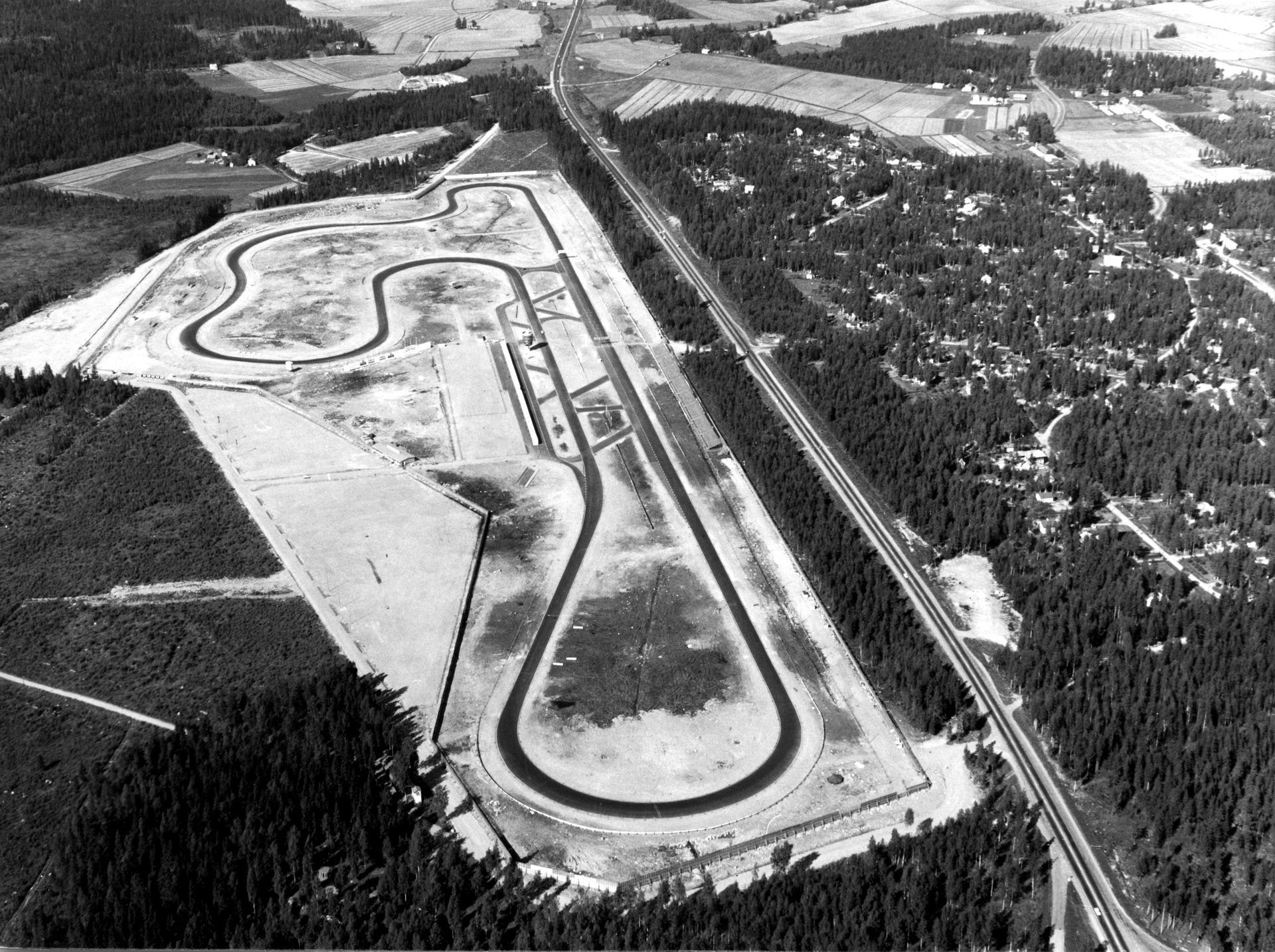
Aerial photograph from 1966.

Following a fatal accident at Eläintarha racetrack in 1963, the street circuit was closed for good and a need for a permanent racetrack was born in Finland. While the Finnish national motor racing association AKK was planning a new track at Tattarisuo in Helsinki, Curt Lincoln, a Finnish motorsport legend, leased a better suited place near the village of Keimola, Vantaa. The area of 52 ha (130 acres) was more than enough to build a racetrack of international proportions. The track was opened on 12 June 1966 with races of various classes.

The track was designed to fit Formula Two specifications, being too short for Formula One cars. Because Formula One drivers could also participate in Formula Two races during the late 1960s, the track saw legends like Jim Clark, Graham Hill, Jack Brabham, Jochen Rindt and Denny Hulme in 1966 and 1967. The track raised interest into Formula Vee in the late 1960s.

In addition to race events, the track was used to host music festivals in the 1970s. They included Helsinki Rock Festivals (or Keimola-Rock) in 1972 and 1973. The 1972 event became known as "Keimola mud festival" after a rainstorm transformed the rallycross track into a lake.

=== Closure ===
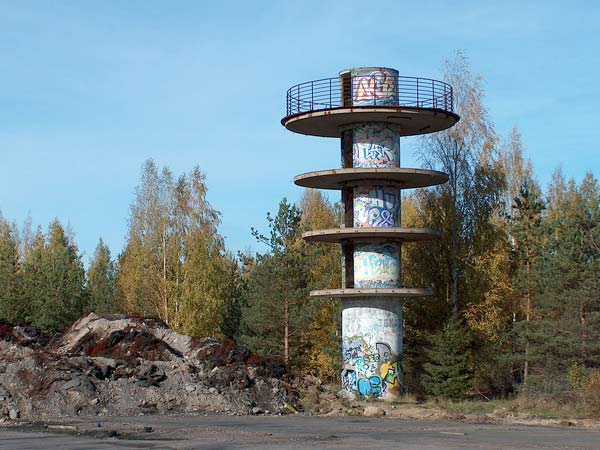
The burned control tower in 2005.

Financial difficulties finally led to the closure of the track at the end of 1978. The last event held on the track was a world record in reverse driving made by journalists of Tekniikan Maailma and Vauhdin Maailma on 20 and 21 October 1978. They drove a Volvo 343 equipped with a Variomatic continuously variable transmission, which meant the car could be driven at the same speed in both directions. The total distance was 1,770 km (1,100 mi) covered during 24 hours.

After the closure, the track remained in a good condition for some time, with local enthusiasts using the track illegally. These were called the "moonlight races" (Finnish: kuutamoajot). These races ended with a moose accident on 10 May 1988, which injured seriously a young motorist. Deep ditches were then cut through the track at five locations. These were quickly filled with sand by moonlight racers, but the owner of the track area soon learned about this and destroyed the surface of the track with a plough in early 1989. This ended the racing for good.

The track has been unsuitable for driving for many years, but some structures are left standing, such as the control tower next to the back straight and a television camera tower near turn seven. The control tower was badly damaged in a fire in 2004 and its door is sealed shut with concrete.

=== Future ===
During the next few years, the track will be redeveloped into a residential area with some roads running on the original track. The control tower will also be preserved as a historical monument. The track area is owned by media group Sanoma.

== Layout ==
The Keimola karting track.

The track was designed by Curt Lincoln and another Finnish race driver, Fred Geitel, using a ruler and compass. This resulted in clearly defined corners joined by long straights. The track length was measured to be 3.300 km (2.051 mi) on the center line. Its width varied between 9 and 15 m (30 and 49 ft) with height differences of only 14 m (46 ft). The pits were located on the back straight, between turns 1 and 2. Access roads between the front and back straights allowed various layout configurations to be used.

The first Finnish rallycross track was built partly inside of the twistier part of the circuit, partly outside of it, in 1974.

A twisty karting track was built behind the turn two Volkswagen grandstand in 1971. Many well-known Finnish racing drivers, such as Mika Häkkinen, JJ Lehto and Mika Salo took on the track in their youth. The track length was 687 m (2,254 ft) and its width 6 m (20 ft).

== Racing events in Keimola ==
=== Interserie ===
Keimola was host to a round of the European prototype series Interserie between 1970 and 1972 after a grid of three cars participated in a round of the Nordic Challenge Cup in 1969. Finnish driver Leo Kinnunen from AAW Racing Team drove three full seasons between 1971–1973 and won the championship in every year, which increased interest into the series. The track record is also held by Kinnunen who drove it in 1972 Interserie race with Porsche 917/10 TC. The lap time was 1:11.740 with an average speed of 165.4 km/h (102.8 mph). The winners of these races are listed as:

Year	Winner	Car	Laps	Time
1969	(Austria) Jochen Rindt	Porsche 908	35	0:45:31.030
1970	(Netherlands) Gijs van Lennep	Porsche 917	50	1:04:27.750
1971	(Finland) Leo Kinnunen	Porsche 917	70	1:26:07.190
1972	(Finland) Leo Kinnunen	Porsche 917	70	1:34:23.350

=== Drag racing ===
Keimola hosted Finland's first ever drag racing competition in 1975. The quarter-mile track was run on the front straight, opposite to the normal running direction.

== Rallycross events in Keimola ==
=== 1970s ===
The first Keimola Rallycross race was organised and driven on 9 June 1974. It was a round of the Embassy/ERA European Rallycross Championship that was won by Swede Björn Waldegård. Between 1974 and 1978 there were a total of five ERC rounds at the venue, all organised by the Helsinki-based club Helsingin Urheiluautoilijat, and the last three were recognized by the FIA as rounds of the FIA European Championships for Rallycross Drivers.

=== All ERC round winners at Keimola ===
- 09.06.1974: Björn Waldegård (Sweden), Porsche Carrera RSR
- 01.06.1975: Dick Riefel (Netherlands), VW 1303S with Porsche Carrera engine
- 30.05.1976: Franz Wurz (Austria), Lancia Stratos HF
- 29.05.1977: Herbert Grünsteidl (Austria), Alpine A310 V6
- 28.05.1978: TC Division – Per-Inge Walfridsson (Sweden), Volvo 343 Turbo
- 28.05.1978: GT Division – Olle Arnesson (Sweden), Porsche Carrera

== Lap records ==
The fastest official race lap records at the Keimola Motor Stadium are listed as:

Category	Time	Driver	Vehicle	Event
Full Circuit (1966–1978): 3.300 km (2.051 mi)
Group 7	1:11.740	Leo Kinnunen	Porsche 917/10 TC	1972 Keimola Interserie round
Group 6	1:16.300	Jochen Rindt	Porsche 908	1969 Keimola Nordic Challenge Cup round
Formula Two	1:16.810	Jim Clark	Lotus 48	1967 Keimola F2 round
