= Estonian Grand Prix =

International auto racing competition held in Estonia

- Pirita-Kose

Race information
- Number of times held: 3
- First held: 1934
- Last held: 1936
- Most wins (drivers): no repeat winners
- Most wins (constructors): no repeat winners
- Circuit length: 6.761 km (4.226 miles)
- Race length: 67.61 km (42.26 miles)
- Laps: 10 laps

Last race (1936)

Pole position

Podium
- 1. (Finland) Aleksi Patama; Ford Special

Fastest lap

The Estonian Grand Prix was a motor race. Mostly held for motorcycles, three times it was held for cars in the period between the World Wars. The race was established on a road course held between the villages of Pirita and Kose, near Tallinn.

The race was established in 1933 and in 1934 it was first held for cars. In 1935 a collection of Grand Prix style machinery with the race being won by regular Grand Prix racer, Karl Ebb in a Mercedes-Benz SSK ahead of the Bugatti Type 35 of Emil Elo and Asser Wallenius driving a Ford V8 roadster. The poorly attended 1936 race was won by Aleksi Patama but after that the race reverted purely to motorcycle racing.

== Winners of the Estonian Grand Prix ==
Year	Driver	Constructor	Location	Report
1934	(United Kingdom) Tom Ferrier (Estonia) Hans Tael	Singer; Chevrolet	Pirita-Kose	Report
1935	(Finland) Karl Ebb	Mercedes-Benz SSK	Pirita-Kose	Report
1936	(Finland) Aleksi Patama	Ford Special	Pirita-Kose	Report
