= Curt Lincoln =

Finnish racing driver (1918–2005)

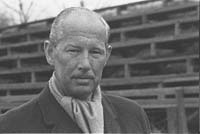
Lincoln in 1963

Curt Richard Lincoln (8 October 1918 – 28 August 2005) was a Swedish-Finnish racing driver. He was one of the most famous race car drivers in Finland, and also played Davis Cup tennis internationally.

== Early life ==
Born in Stockholm, Lincoln moved to Helsinki, Finland, as a child with his family in 1926. He was one of the Swedish volunteers who fought for Finland in World War II. Lincoln served as a transport driver in the 10th Division during the Continuation War.

== Racing career ==
Lincoln's racing career started with hydroplanes in 1947. In 1949 he changed to a 500 cc Effyh, later he also drove cars such as Jaguar D-type, Ferrari and Formula 3 Coopers. During his career he drove around 400 races and had around 200 wins. He won 14 Finnish Eläintarha races between 1951 and 1962 in the Formula 3 and Junior classes. Other wins were the GP of Angola and two class wins at the Swedish GP in Kristianstad. He was also one of the organisers when Keimola Motor Stadium was built in Finland. He had his last win in 1967 with F3 Brabham BT21 at Keimola and retired from racing in the next year, at age 50.

== Tennis career ==
Lincoln was also a top level tennis player, being both the Finnish and Swedish Champion. Lincoln represented Finland during the 1954 Davis Cup Europe Zone first round tie against Norway, played in Helsinki. He played in the doubles rubber with partner Sakari Salo and lost in four sets to Nils-Erik Hessen and Rolf Pape.

== Personal life ==
Lincoln became a Finnish citizen in 1961. His daughter Nina was married to Jochen Rindt who in 1970 became posthumous Formula One World Champion.

He died in Espoo. He is buried in the Hietaniemi Cemetery in Helsinki.

== See also ==
- List of Finland Davis Cup team representatives
