= 1954 Davis Cup America Zone =

International tennis competition

The America Zone was one of the two regional zones of the 1954 Davis Cup.

7 teams entered the America Zone, with the winner going on to compete in the Inter-Zonal Final against the winner of the Europe Zone. The United States defeated Mexico in the final, and went on to face Sweden in the Inter-Zonal Final.

== Draw ==
Quarterfinals; 9–18 July
Cuba
bye
Port of Spain, Trinidad and Tobago (clay)
United States	5
Caribbean/West Indies	0
Mexico City, Mexico (clay)
Mexico	3
Japan	2
Toronto, Canada (grass)
Chile	2
Canada	3

Semifinals; 31 July–22 August
St. Petersburg, FL, United States (grass)
Cuba	0
United States	5
Mexico City, Mexico (clay)
Mexico	4
Canada	1

Final; 1–3 October
Mexico City, Mexico (clay)
United States	4
Mexico	1

== Quarterfinals ==
=== Caribbean/West Indies vs. United States ===
Caribbean/West Indies
0
Tranquillity Square Lawn Tennis Club, Port of Spain, Trinidad and Tobago
16–18 July 1954
Clay

United States
5

			1	2	3	4	5
1	(Cricket West Indies) (United States)	Geoffrey Inglefield; Ham Richardson	2; 6	2; 6	0; 6
2	(Cricket West Indies) (United States)	Ralph Legall; Straight Clark	2; 6	0; 6	3; 6
3	(Cricket West Indies) (United States)	Ralph Legall / Harold Nothnagel; Harold Burrows / Straight Clark	0; 6	1; 6	3; 6
4	(Cricket West Indies) (United States)	Derek Phang; Ham Richardson	0; 6	0; 6	2; 6
5	(Cricket West Indies) (United States)	Geoffrey Inglefield; Harold Burrows	0; 6	0; 6	3; 6

=== Mexico vs. Japan ===
Mexico
3
Centro Deportivo Chapultepec, Mexico City, Mexico
9–11 July 1954
Clay

Japan
2

			1	2	3	4	5
1	(Mexico) (Japan)	Francisco Contreras; Atsushi Miyagi	5; 7	1; 6	6; 3	3; 6
2	(Mexico) (Japan)	Mario Llamas; Kosei Kamo	4; 6	7; 5	7; 5	6; 1
3	(Mexico) (Japan)	Francisco Contreras / Gustavo Palafox; Kosei Kamo / Atsushi Miyagi	11; 9	4; 6	4; 6	6; 2	6; 4
4	(Mexico) (Japan)	Mario Llamas; Atsushi Miyagi	6; 3	6; 2	8; 6
5	(Mexico) (Japan)	Rafael Ortega; Kosei Kamo	5; 7	4; 6	7; 5	4; 6

=== Canada vs. Chile ===
Canada
3
Toronto CS&C Club, Toronto, Canada
16–18 July 1954
Grass

Chile
2

			1	2	3	4	5
1	(Canada) (Chile)	Lorne Main; Luis Ayala	4; 6	6; 3	4; 6	8; 6	6; 3
2	(Canada) (Chile)	Robert Bédard; Ricardo Balbiers	6; 3	7; 5	7; 5
3	(Canada) (Chile)	Lorne Main / Paul Willey; Luis Ayala / Andrés Hammersley	11; 13	3; 6	0; 6
4	(Canada) (Chile)	Lorne Main; Andrés Hammersley	6; 4	11; 13	3; 6	6; 4	6; 3
5	(Canada) (Chile)	Robert Bédard; Luis Ayala	1; 6	3; 6	1; 6

== Semifinals ==
=== United States vs. Cuba ===
United States
5
St. Petersburg Tennis Club, St. Petersburg, FL, United States
31 July–2 August 1954
Grass

Cuba
0

			1	2	3	4	5
1	(United States) (Cuba)	Straight Clark; Reynaldo Garrido	6; 0	9; 7	7; 5
2	(United States) (Cuba)	Ham Richardson; Orlando Garrido	6; 2	6; 3	6; 1
3	(United States) (Cuba)	Harold Burrows / Straight Clark; Orlando Garrido / Reynaldo Garrido	6; 2	6; 4	6; 3
4	(United States) (Cuba)	Harold Burrows; Orlando Garrido	6; 4	6; 4	6; 4
5	(United States) (Cuba)	Ham Richardson; Reynaldo Garrido	6; 1	6; 2	6; 2

=== Mexico vs. Canada ===
Mexico
4
Centro Deportivo Chapultepec, Mexico City, Mexico
20–22 August 1954
Clay

Canada
1

			1	2	3	4	5
1	(Mexico) (Canada)	Mario Llamas; Lorne Main	6; 3	6; 4	6; 3
2	(Mexico) (Canada)	Gustavo Palafox; Robert Bédard	8; 6	6; 3	3; 6	6; 0
3	(Mexico) (Canada)	Francisco Contreras / Francisco Guerrero Arcocha; Brendan Macken / Lorne Main	5; 7	7; 5	3; 6	2; 6
4	(Mexico) (Canada)	Gustavo Palafox; Lorne Main	8; 6	3; 6	6; 3	1; 6	6; 4
5	(Mexico) (Canada)	Mario Llamas; Paul Willey	6; 1	6; 1	6; 4

== Final ==
=== Mexico vs. United States ===
Mexico
1
Centro Deportivo Chapultepec, Mexico City, Mexico
1–3 October 1954
Clay

United States
4

			1	2	3	4	5
1	(Mexico) (United States)	Gustavo Palafox; Vic Seixas	6; 4	6; 4	7; 5
2	(Mexico) (United States)	Mario Llamas; Tony Trabert	4; 6	3; 6	6; 8
3	(Mexico) (United States)	Mario Llamas / Gustavo Palafox; Vic Seixas / Tony Trabert	2; 6	6; 3	1; 6	4; 6
4	(Mexico) (United States)	Mario Llamas; Vic Seixas	4; 6	6; 2	3; 6	2; 6
5	(Mexico) (United States)	Gustavo Palafox; Tony Trabert	12; 14	1; 6	2; 6
