= Kose, Tallinn =

Subdistrict of Tallinn, Estonia

Coordinates: 59.459209°N 24.873176°E

Kose
- Subdistrict of Tallinn
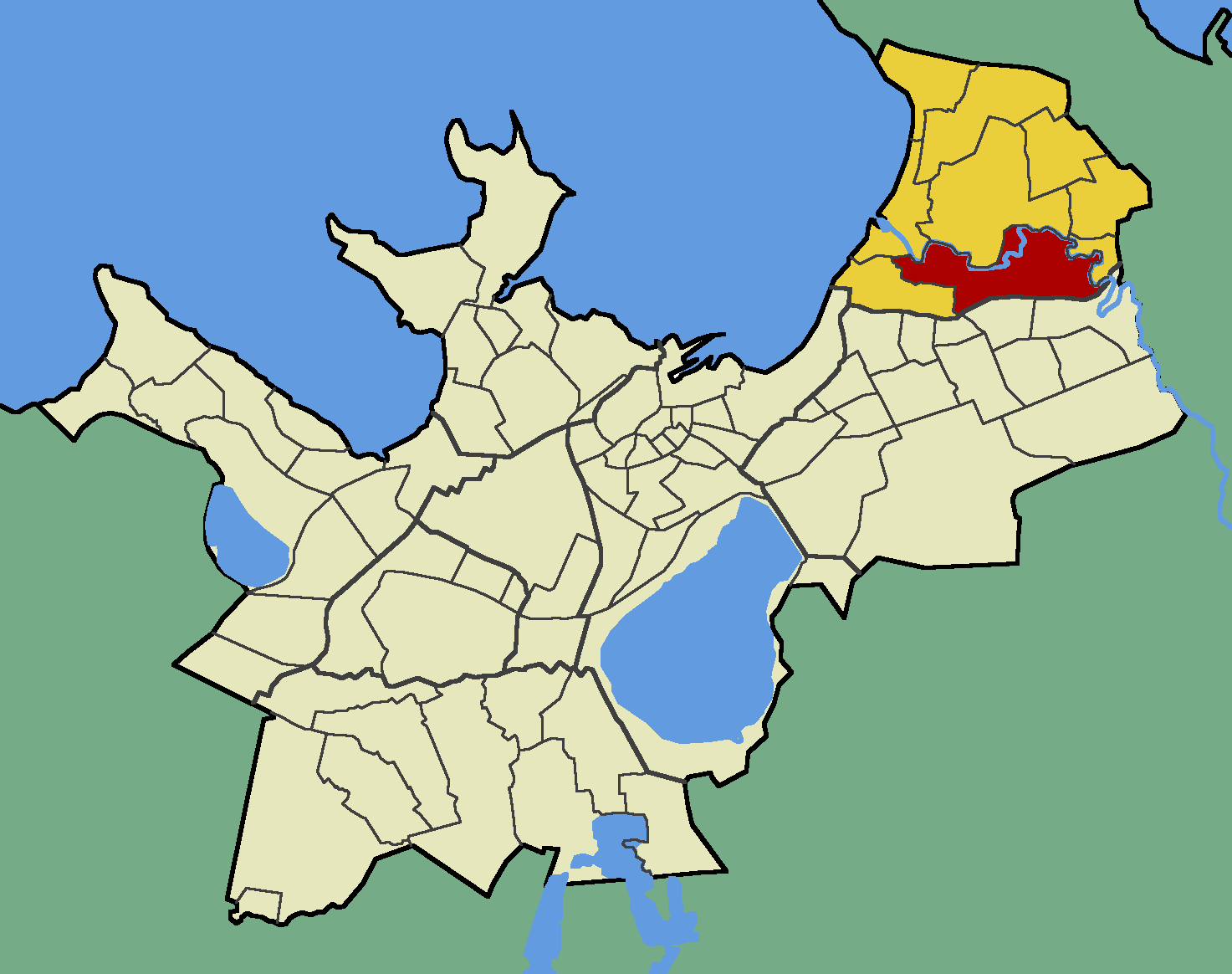
- Kose within Pirita District.
- Country: Estonia
- County: Harju County
- City: Tallinn
- District: Pirita

Population (01.01.2014)
  - Total: 3,351

Kose (Estonian for "Falls"; also known as Pirita-Kose) is a subdistrict of the district of Pirita in Tallinn, the capital of Estonia. It has a population of 3,351 (As of 1 January 2014).

== Gallery ==
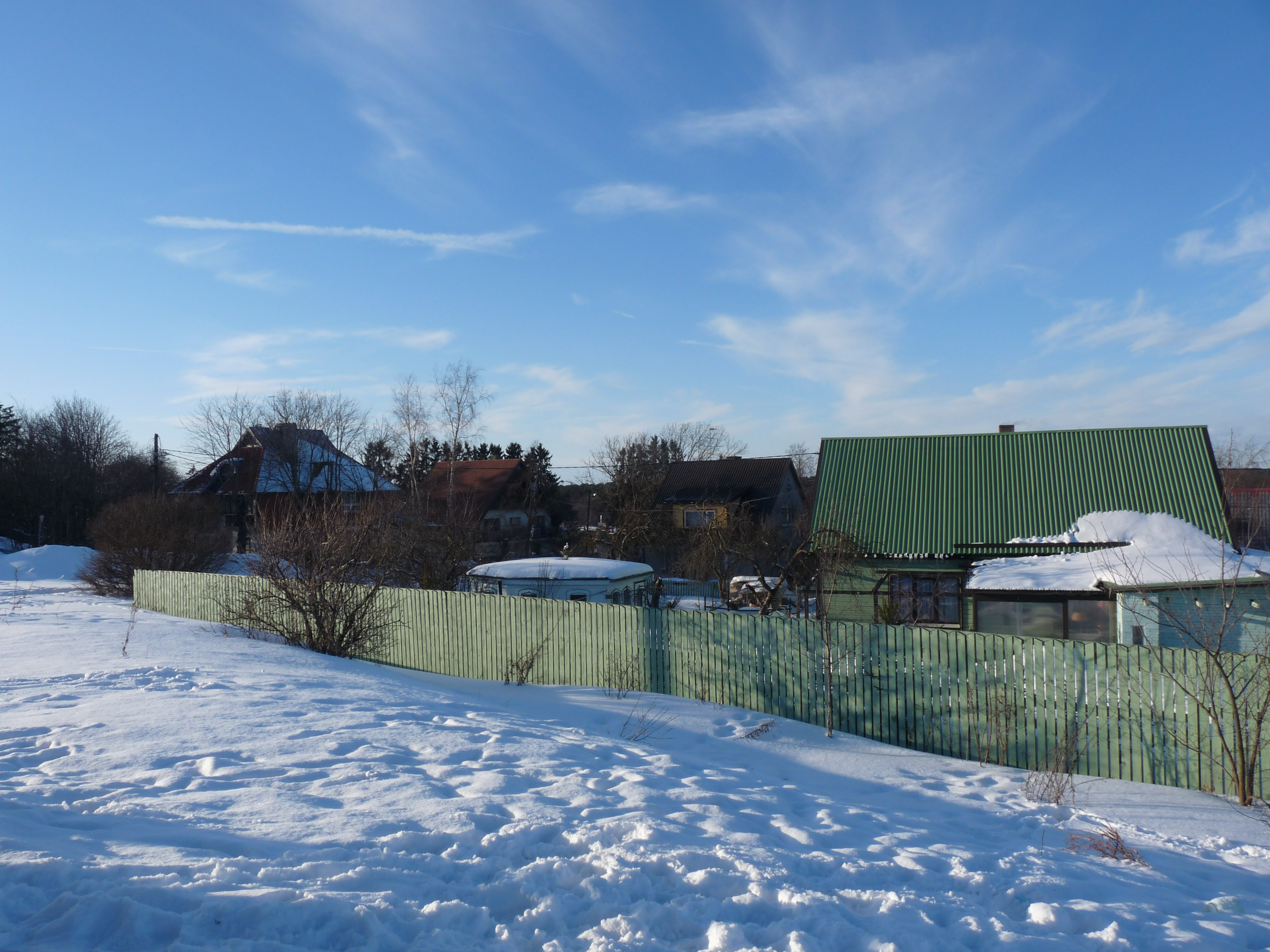

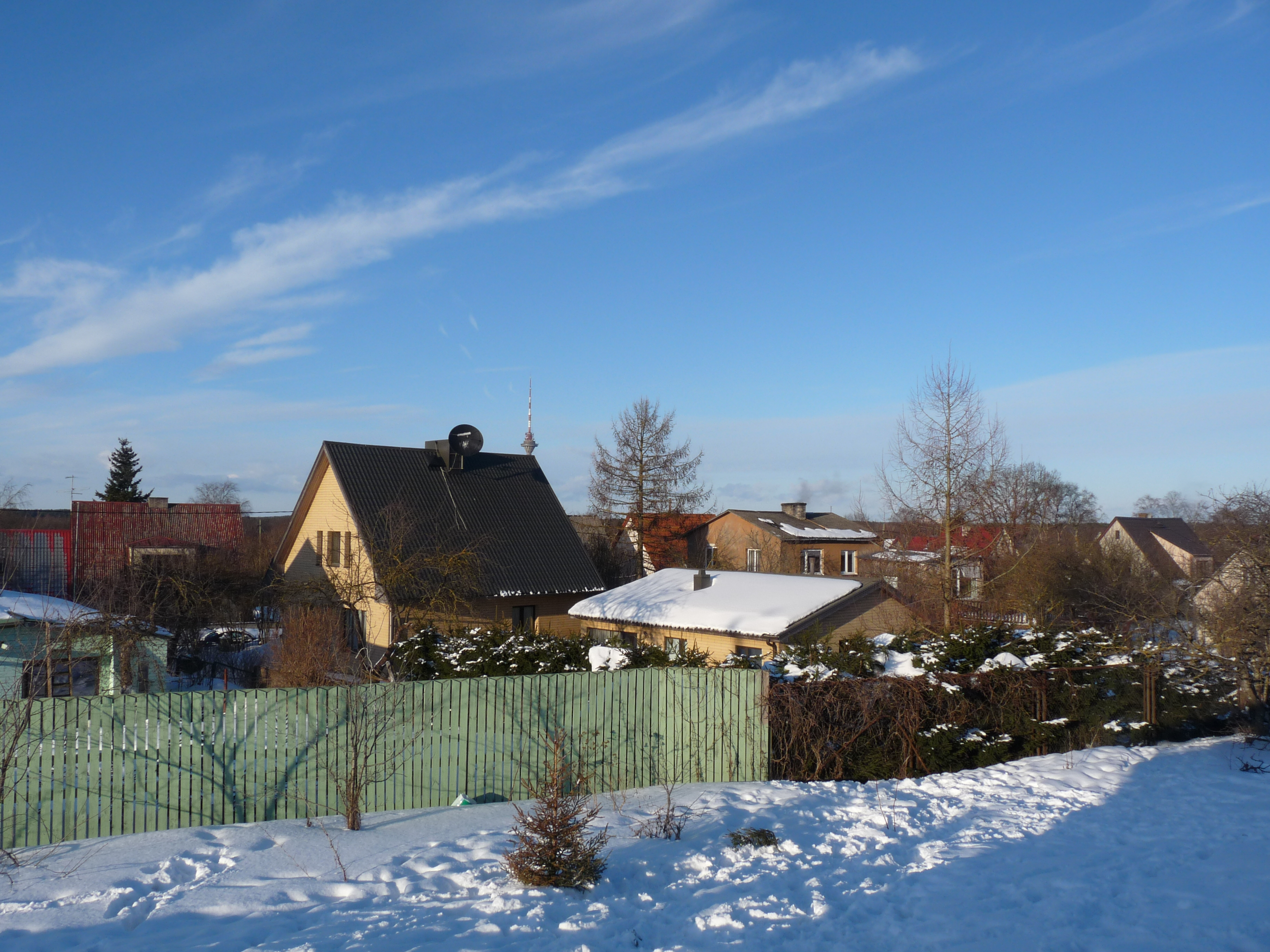

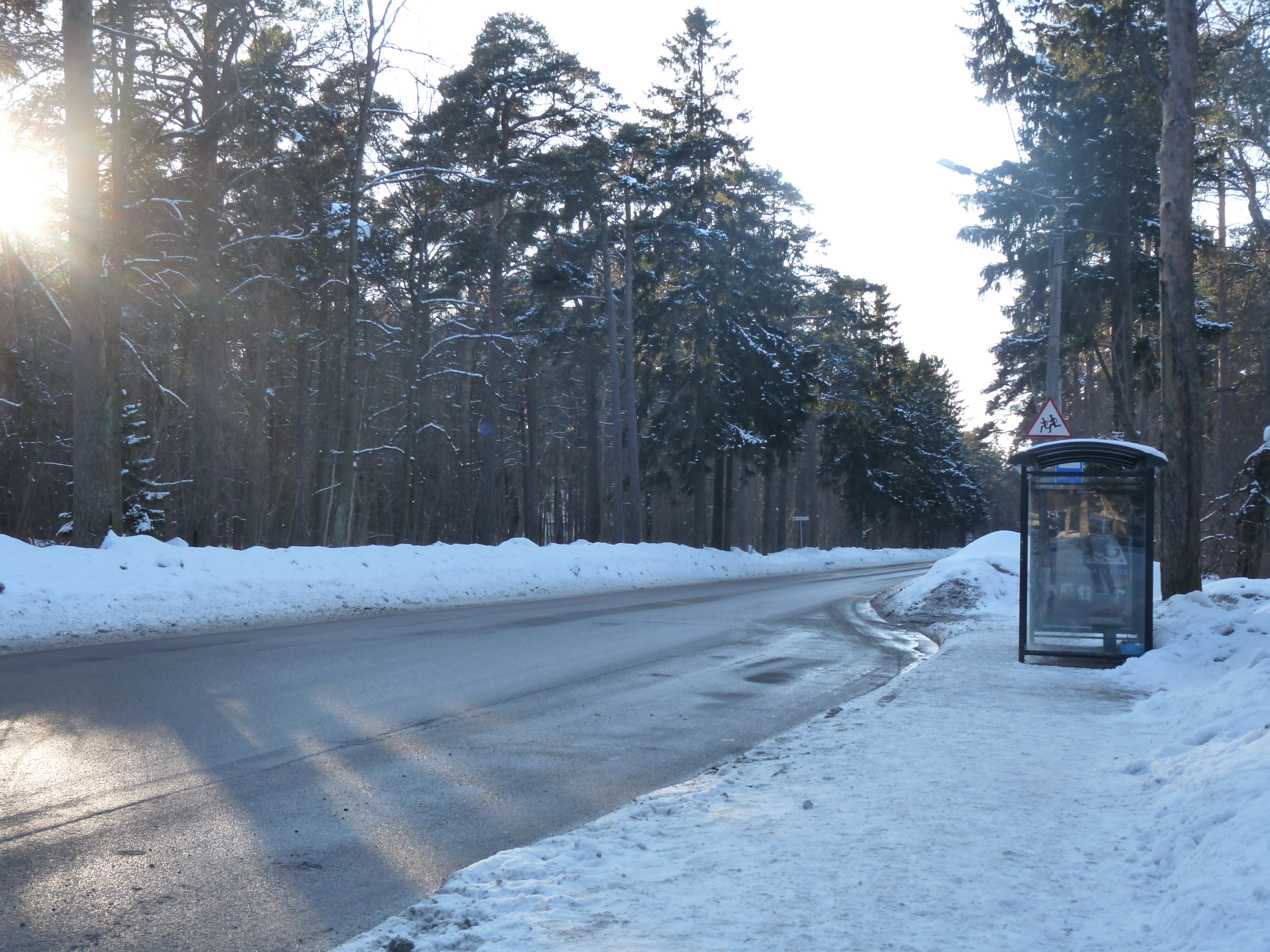

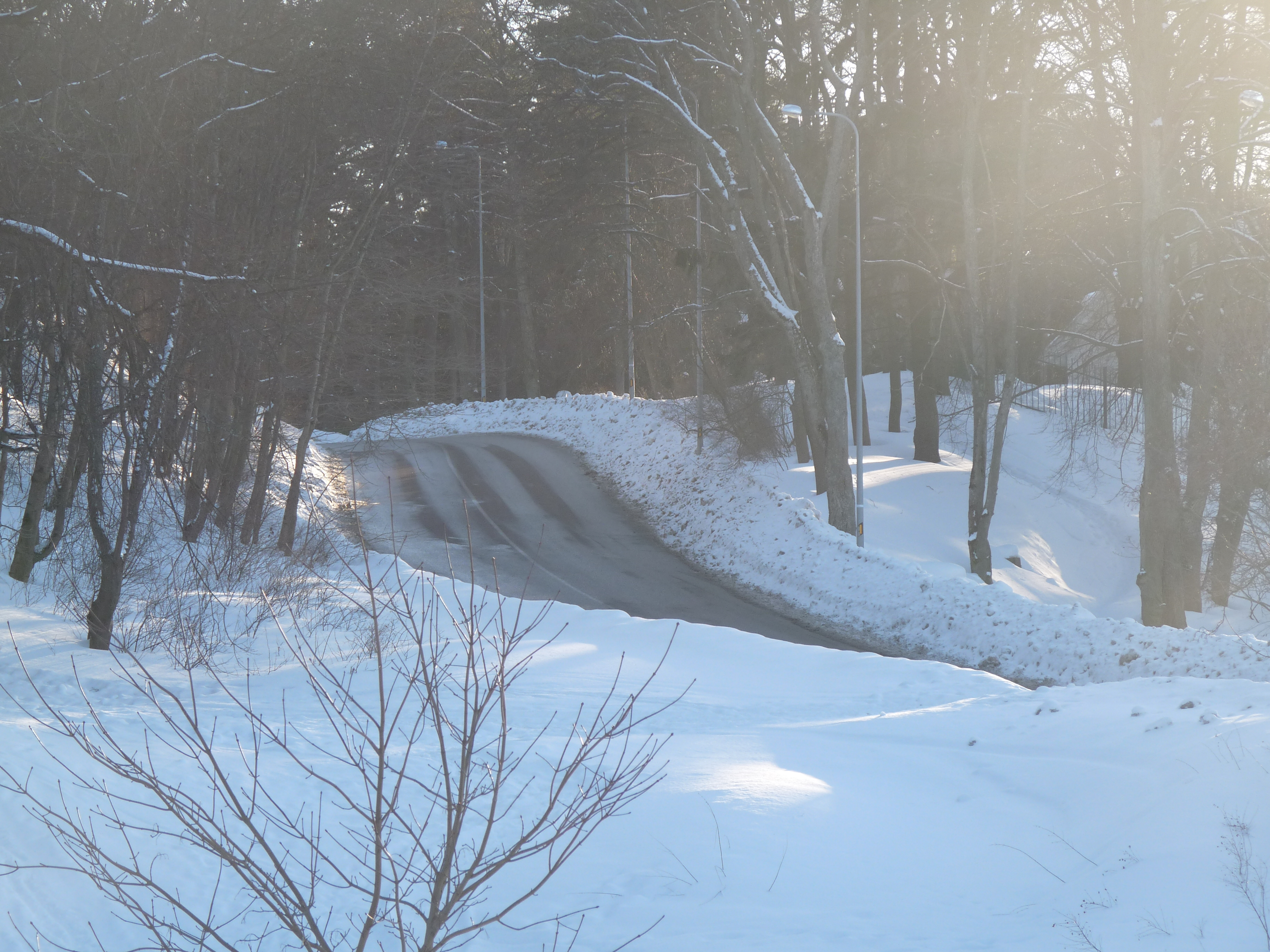

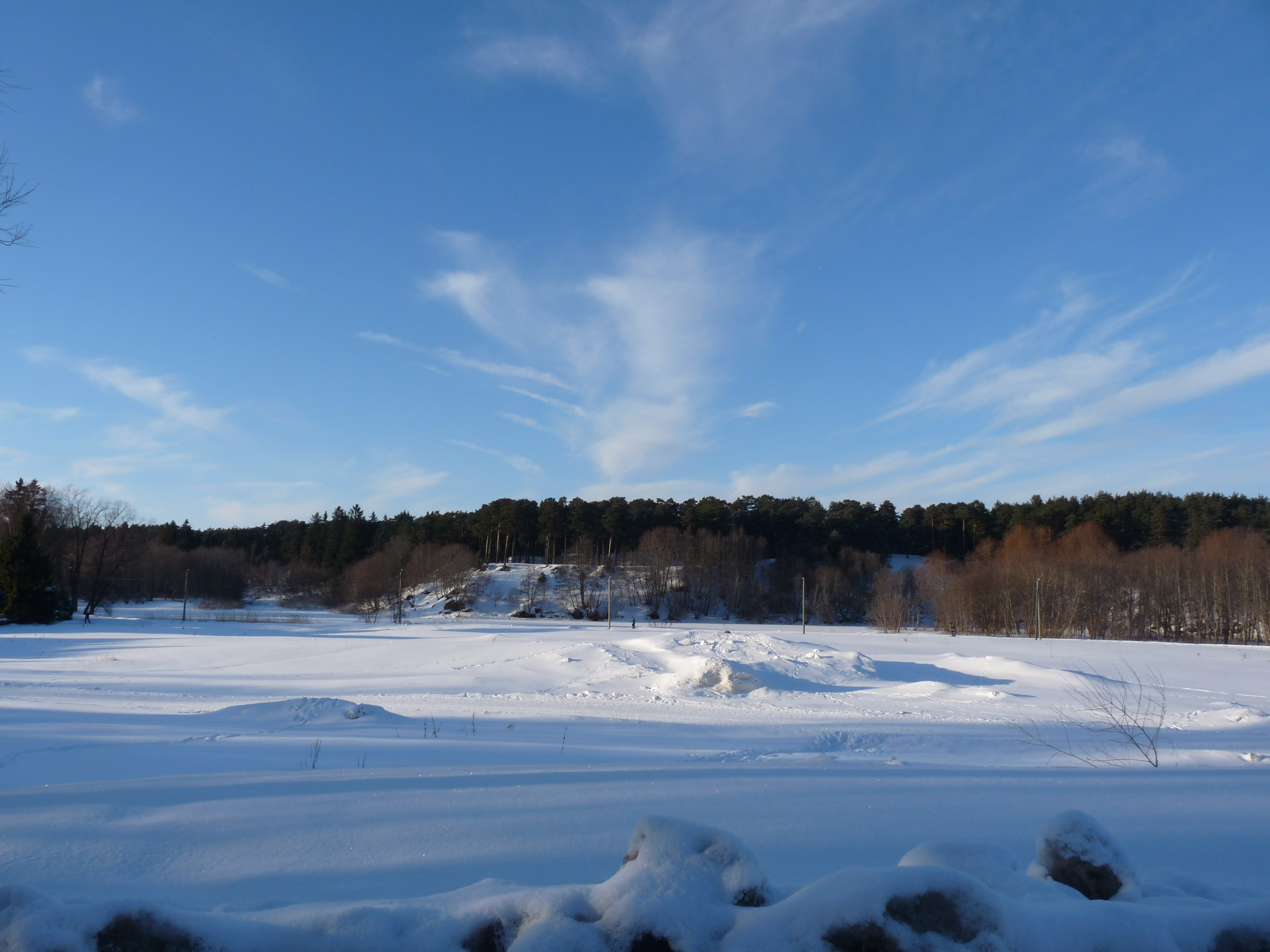

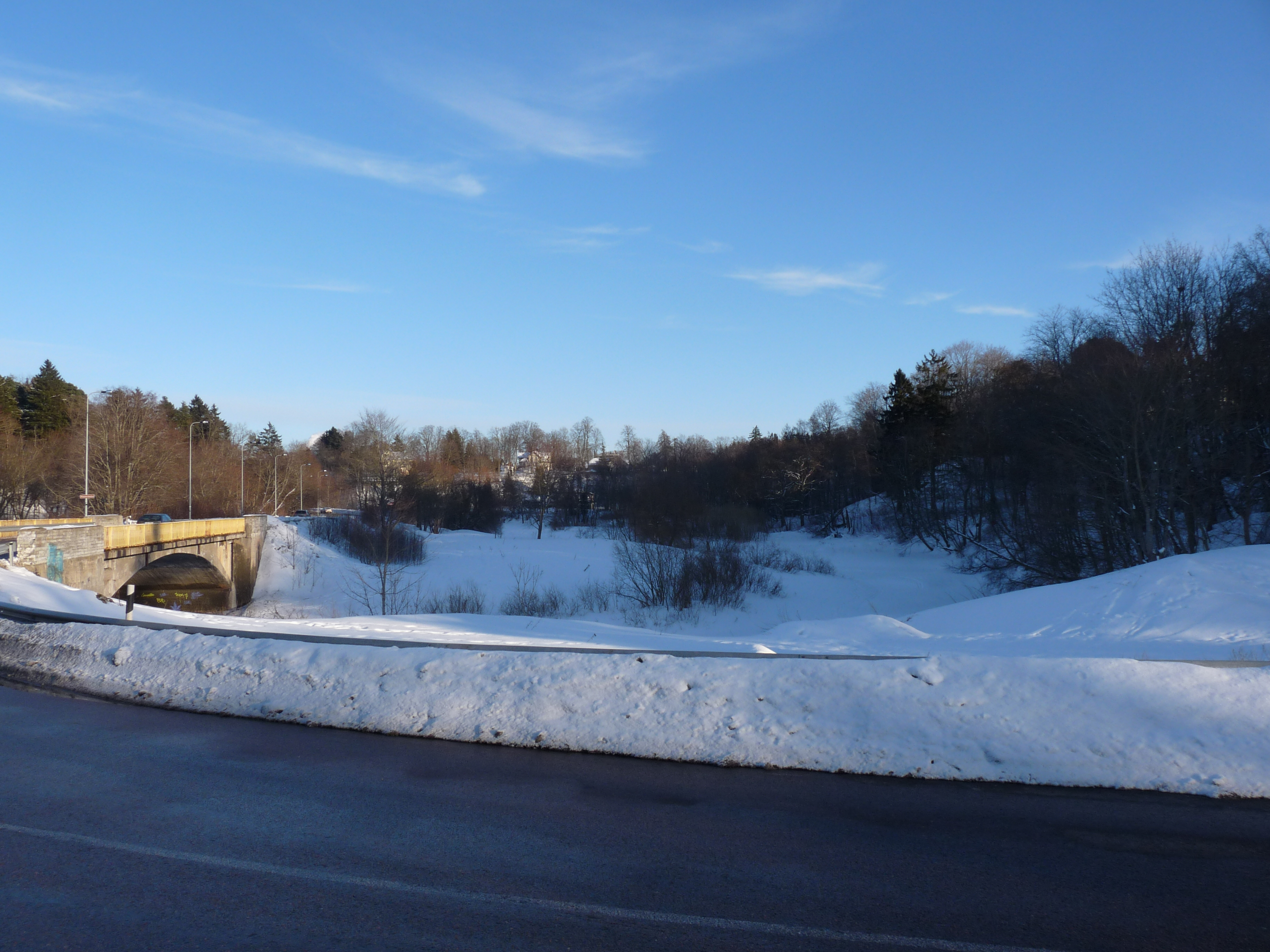

== See also ==
- Pirita River
- Pirita-Kose-Kloostrimetsa Circuit
- Tallinn Botanic Garden
