= Eläintarhan ajot =

Car race in Finland

Coordinates: 60.189009°N 24.931991°E

Eläintarha track profile, length 2,034 m (1.26 mi) (1932), 2,000 m (1.24 mi) (from 1933)

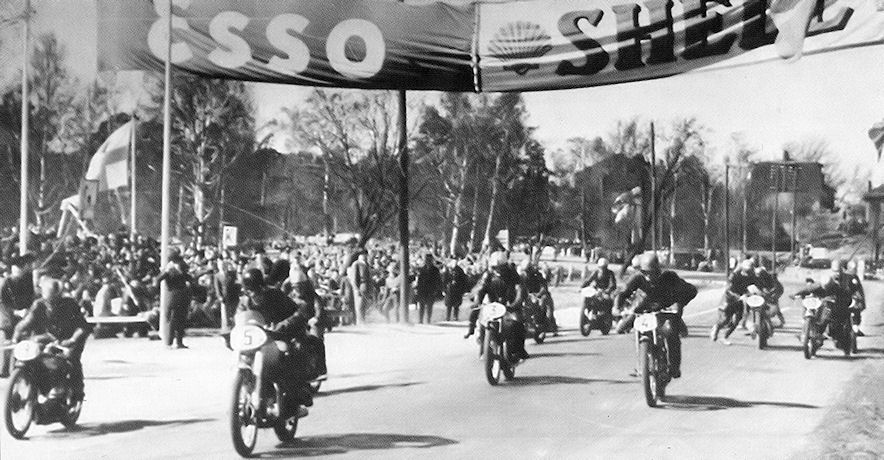
A start in the motorcycle class in the 1930s.

Eläintarhan ajot (Finnish: Suomen Suurajot; Suomen Grand Prix) was a Finnish motor racing competition arranged between years 1932 and 1963 in Eläintarha, Helsinki, Finland. The idea for the race came from a racing driver, S. P. J. Keinänen. Its racing history included the pre-war Finnish Grand Prix.

== First race ==
The first Grand Prix-race was a success and it attracted around 25,000 spectators. There were ten cars in the first start, six of them Finnish and four Swedish. The very first win went to the Swede Per Viktor Widengren who drove a Mercedes-Benz, second to qualify was S. P. J. Keinänen in a Chrysler and the third place went to Karl Ebb driving a Mercedes-Benz.

=== Motorcycles ===
Motorcycle races were also held from the beginning – the first motorcycle win was also taken by a Swede – Gunnar Kalén. The best-placed Finn was Raine Lampinen who finished second in the lower class.

== Last race ==
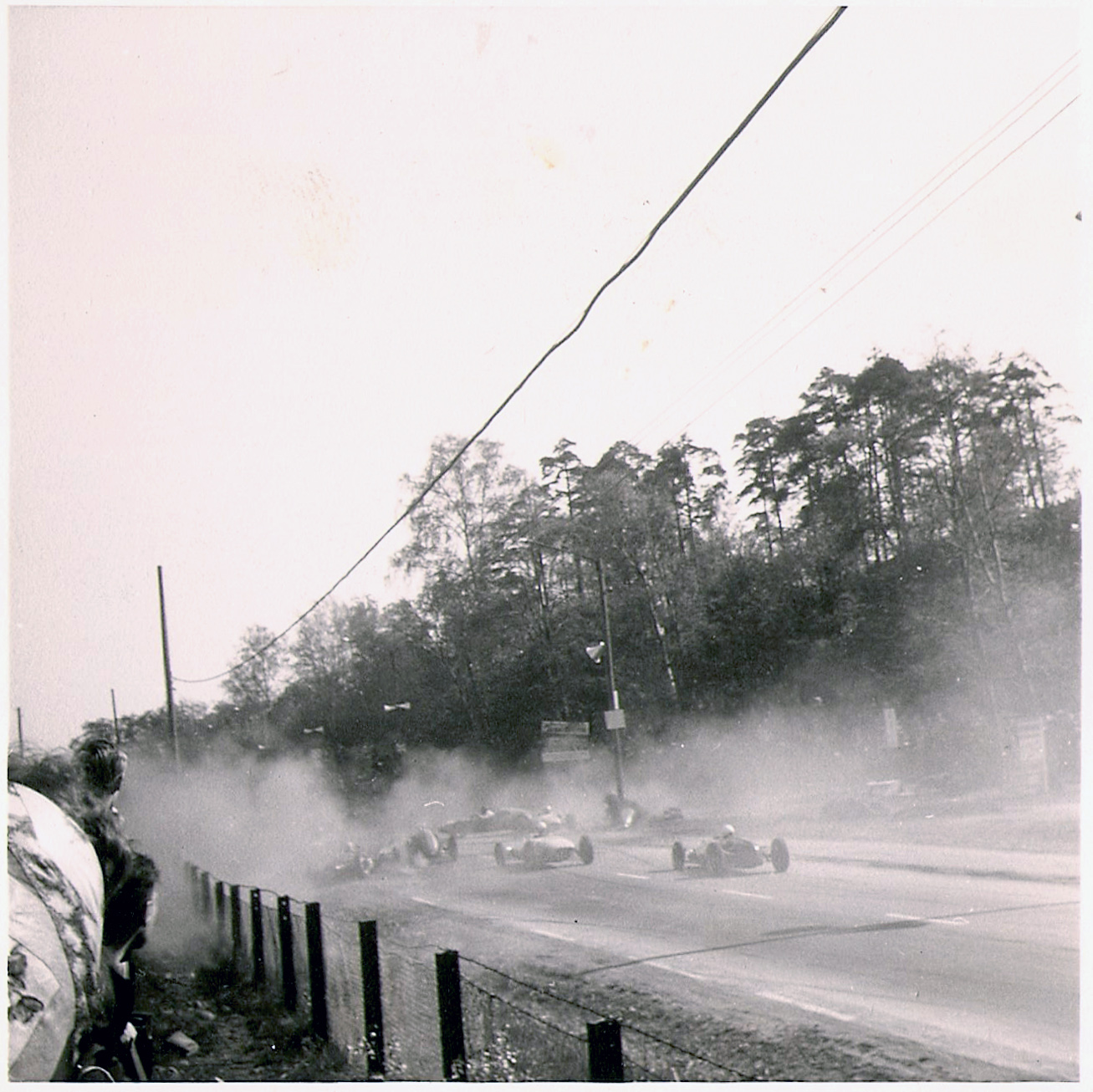
The accident which ended the races in May 1963

The Eläintarha race was an annual happening in Helsinki for almost 30 years until the final race was held in 1963. The winner of this last race was Timo Mäkinen, although the main start (Formula Junior) was canceled after a fatal accident. At the start a driver (whose identity has not been confirmed) hit Curt Lincoln's Brabham BT6 (Formula Junior), and the car slid to the left side of track. Most drivers managed to avoid a collision but the Swedish Örjan Atterberg hit his countryman Freddy Kottulinsky. Unfortunately Atterberg's car flipped over and the driver was pinned under his vehicle. As a result of the crash Atterberg sustained fatal injuries. The race was stopped by the race officials one minute after crash and the jury told the race was over.

As the setup was considered too dangerous this was the final race to be conducted on the city circuit. The racing events that followed the ill-fated Eläintarha race were held at Keimola Motor Stadium between 1966–1978.

In the 1930s motor racing events were also arranged couple of times in Munkkiniemi, a residential district in northwest Helsinki.

== Afterwards ==
The race has been arranged three times since to honour its memory – the first time was in 1982, then 1992 and the last time was in 2002. In the 1992 event Juan Manuel Fangio was present. Around 2005, a detailed and driveable virtual recreation of the circuit appeared for the Grand Prix Legends historical racing simulation.

== Statistics ==
- Active years: 1932–39 and 1946–63
- Circuit length: 2,034 m (1.26 mi) (1932), 2,000 m (1.24 mi) (from 1933)
- Lap record: David Hitches, Lola Mk 5 Ford, time: 57.1 seconds/126 km/h (78 mph) (1963)
- Most spectators: 82,597 (1958)
- Most wins: Curt Lincoln (14)

== Results 1932–1963 ==
Year	Driver	Car	Class	Report
1932	(Sweden) Per-Viktor Widengren	Mercedes-Benz SSK	Grand Prix	Report
1933	(Finland) Karl Ebb	Mercedes-Benz SSK	Grand Prix	Report
1934	(Norway) Eugen Bjørnstad	Alfa Romeo 8C 2300 Monza	Grand Prix	Report
1935	(Finland) Karl Ebb	Mercedes Benz SSK 7.1L	Grand Prix	Report
1936	(Norway) Eugen Bjørnstad	Alfa Romeo 8C 2300 Monza	Grand Prix	Report
1937	(Switzerland) Hans Rüesch	Alfa Romeo 8C-35 3.8L	Grand Prix	Report
1938	Not held			
1939	(Sweden) Adolf Westerblom	Alfa Romeo Monza 2.6L	Grand Prix	Report
1946	Only motorcycles			
1947	(Finland) Asser Wallenius	Ford Roadster 1934	Class B	–
1947	(Finland) Helge Hallmann	Ford special	Formula Libre	–
1948	(Sweden) Magnus Knutsson	BMW	Class A	–
1948	(Finland) Leo Mattila	Ford Roadster	Class B	–
1948	(Finland) S. P. J. Keinänen	Chrysler special	Formula Libre	–
1949	(Finland) S. P. J. Keinänen	BMW 328	Class A	–
1951	(Finland) S. P. J. Keinänen	Jaguar XK120	Production	–
1952	(United Kingdom) Michael Head	Jaguar XK120	Division +2000	–
1952	(Sweden) Valdemar Stener	Ferrari 166 MM Touring Barchetta	Division 2000	–
1952	(Belgium) Roger Laurent	Talbot-Lago T26C	Formula 1	Report
1953	(Denmark) Robert Nelleman	Allard	+2000 GT	–
1953	(Sweden) Valdemar Stener	Ferrari 166 MM Touring Barchetta	2000 GT	–
1953	(United Kingdom) Rodney Nuckey	Cooper T23	Formula 1	Report
1953	(Finland) Curt Lincoln	Cooper-Norton	Formula 3	–
1954	(United Kingdom) Michael Head	Jaguar C-type	GT +2000	–
1954	(Sweden) John Bengtsson	Ferrari 166 Touring Barchetta	GT 2000	–
1954	(United Kingdom) Rodney Nuckey	Cooper-Bristol F2	Formula Libre	–
1954	(United Kingdom) Eric Brandon	Cooper-Norton	Formula 3	–
1955	(United Kingdom) Michael Head	Jaguar D-type	Division +2000	–
1955	(Finland) Curt Lincoln	Jaguar C-type	+2000 production	–
1955	(Sweden) Joakim Bonnier	Alfa Romeo 1900 Sprint	2000 production	–
1955	(United Kingdom) Eric Brandon	Cooper	Formula 3	–
1956	(Finland) Curt Lincoln	Jaguar D-type	+2000 production	–
1956	(Finland) Harry Saaristo	Triumph TR2	2000 production	–
1956	(Sweden) John Kvarnström	Ferrari 750 Monza	+2000	–
1956	(United Kingdom) Eric Brandon	Halselec-Climax	2000	–
1956	(United Kingdom) Eric Brandon	Cooper	Formula 3	–
1957	(Sweden) Joakim Bonnier	Maserati 200S	S+2.0	–
1957	(Finland) Curt Lincoln	Ferrari 500 TR	S 2.0	–
1957	(Sweden) Arne Lindberg	Mercedes-Benz 300 SL	GT+2.0	–
1957	(Norway) J.A. Iversen	Porsche 356 Carrera	GT 2.0	–
1957	(Finland) Curt Lincoln	Cooper T 42 Mark XI	Formula 3	–
1958	(United Kingdom) Graham Whitehead	Aston Martin DB3S	Division +2000	–
1958	(United Kingdom) Ivor Bueb	Lotus 12 Coventry Climax	Division 2000	–
1958	(Finland) Curt Lincoln	Ferrari 250 GT TDF	GT +2000	–
1958	(Finland) Curt Lincoln	Cooper T 42 Mark XII	Formula 3	–
1959	(Finland) Carl-Otto Bremer	Ferrari 750 Monza	S+2.0	–
1959	(Finland) Curt Lincoln	Cooper Monaco	S 2.0	–
1959	(Sweden) Carl-Gunnar Hammarlund	Porsche 356 Carrera	GT	–
1959	(Finland) Curt Lincoln	Cooper T 42 Mark XII	Formula 3	–
1960	(United Kingdom) Jimmy Blumer	Cooper Monaco	S 2.0	–
1960	(Finland) Heimo Hietaranta	Cooper/Norton	Formula 3	–
1960	(Finland) Curt Lincoln	Cooper	Formula Junior	–
1961	(United Kingdom) David Hitches	Lola	2000	–
1961	(Finland) Heimo Hietaranta	Cooper/Norton	Formula 3	–
1961	(Finland) Carl-Otto Bremer	Elva 100	Formula Junior	–
1962	(Sweden) Carl-Gunnar Hammarlund	Porsche 356 Carrera	GT +1300cc	–
1962	(Finland) Curt Lincoln	Lotus Elite	GT 1300cc	–
1962	(Finland) Curt Lincoln	Cooper T 42 Mark XII	Formula 3	–
1962	(Sweden) Olle Nygren	Cooper T56	Formula Junior	–
1963	(Finland) Holger Laine	Volvo PV544	ST +1600cc	–
1963	(Finland) Timo Mäkinen	Morris Mini Cooper	ST 1150cc	–
