= Pirita-Kose-Kloostrimetsa Circuit =

Estonian racing track in Tallinn

- Kalevi Circuit (1965–2006)
- Location: Tallinn, Estonia
- Coordinates: 59°28′2.08″N 24°52′8.91″E
- Opened: 17 September 1933; 92 years ago
- Closed: 3 June 2006; 20 years ago
- Major events: Estonian Grand Prix (1934–1936)

Kalevi Circuit (1965–2006)
- Length: 6.026 km (3.744 mi)
- Race lap record: 2:08.832 ( (Estonia) Hanno Velt, Kawasaki Ninja ZX-7RR, 2004, SBK)

Kalevi Circuit (1962–1964)
- Length: 8.648 km (5.374 mi)

Kalevi Circuit (1960–1962)
- Length: 6.755 km (4.197 mi)

Kalevi Circuit (1959–1960)
- Length: 8.566 km (5.323 mi)

Full Circuit (1947–1959)
- Length: 6.735 km (4.185 mi)

Original Circuit (1933–1940)
- Length: 6.761 km (4.201 mi)
- Turns: 20

Pirita-Kose-Kloostrimetsa Circuit (Estonian: Pirita-Kose-Kloostrimetsa ringrada) is an inactive street circuit in Tallinn, Estonia. It is located in Pirita in Kloostrimets (Monastery Forest), crosses the Pirita River twice. The length of the original track was 6.761 km (4.201 mi).

The circuit was opened on 17 September 1933. Motorcycle TT races took place from 1933 to 1939 and car races were held from 1934 to 1936 as Estonian Grand Prix with mainly local and Finnish entries. After World War II the track was used for Soviet championships.

Five-time world champion Joey Dunlop was killed in an accident on the Kloostrimetsa circuit in 2000. A memorial stone was erected a year later. On 3 June 2006, the track was closed for racing after the 2006 annual Kalevi Suursõit motorcycle race as in order to bring the safety up to acceptable levels, hundreds of trees along the track would be needed to be felled, all of which are under protection as part of the park surrounding the track.

== Gallery ==
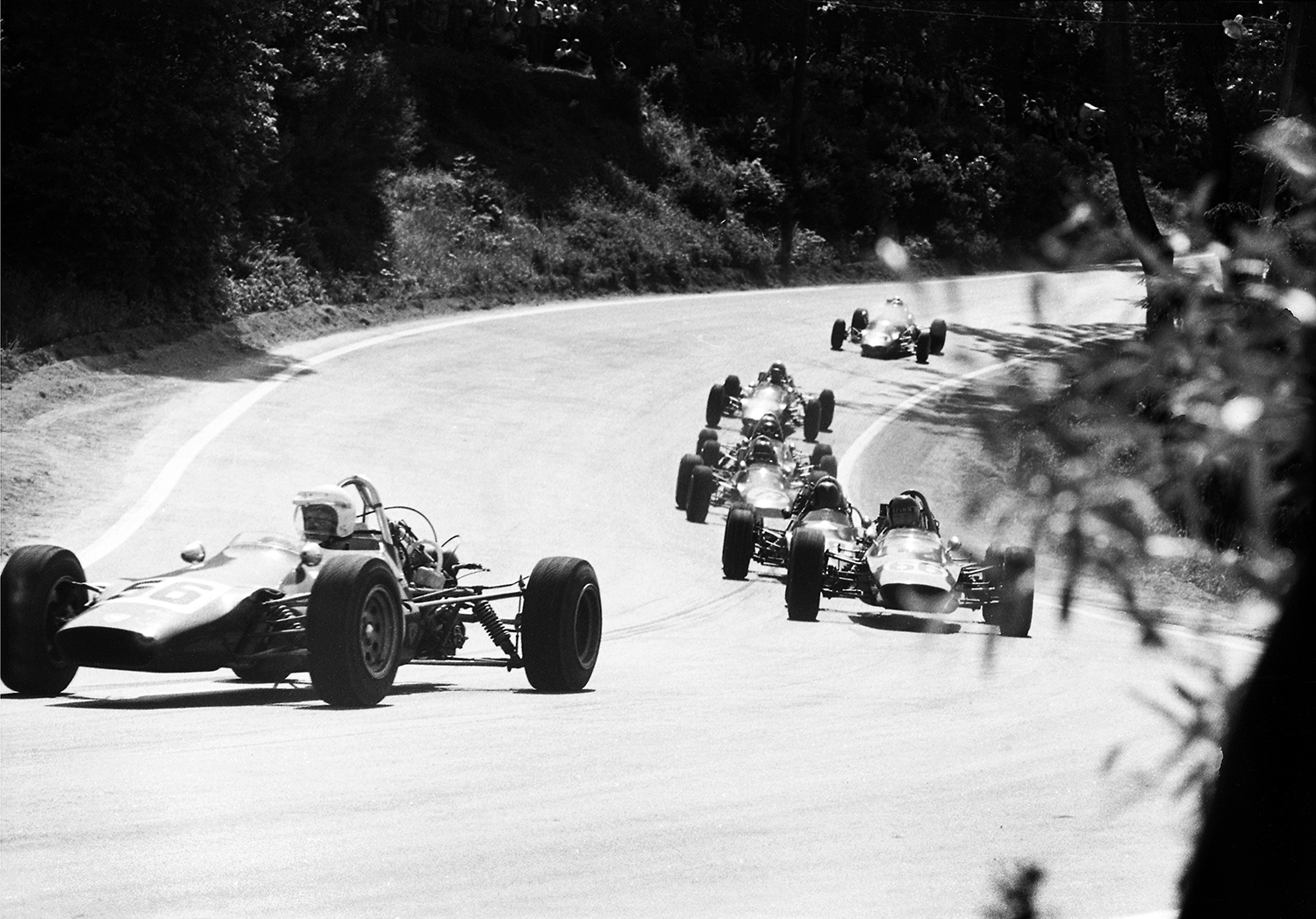
Race in 1974

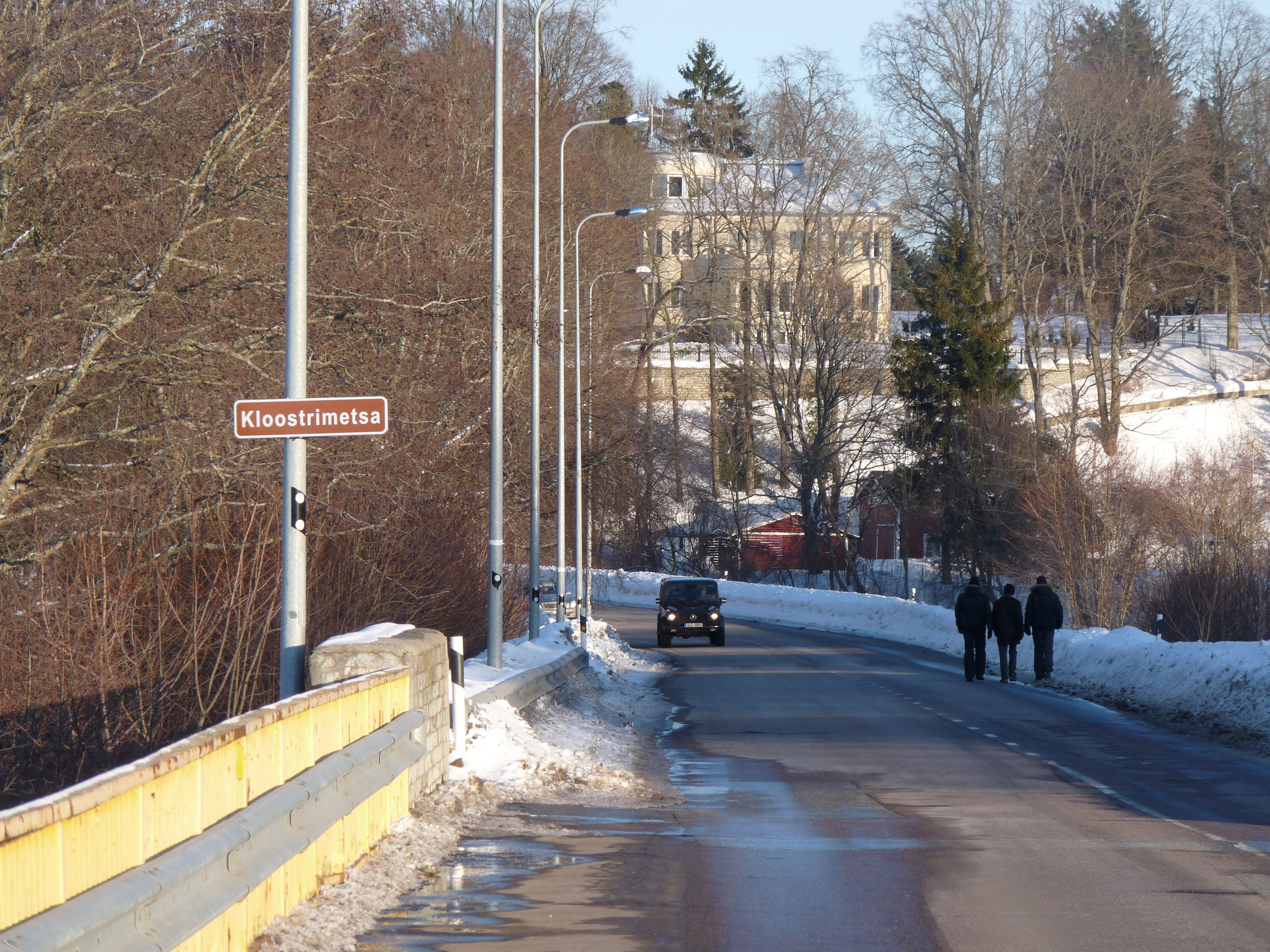
Lükati bridge

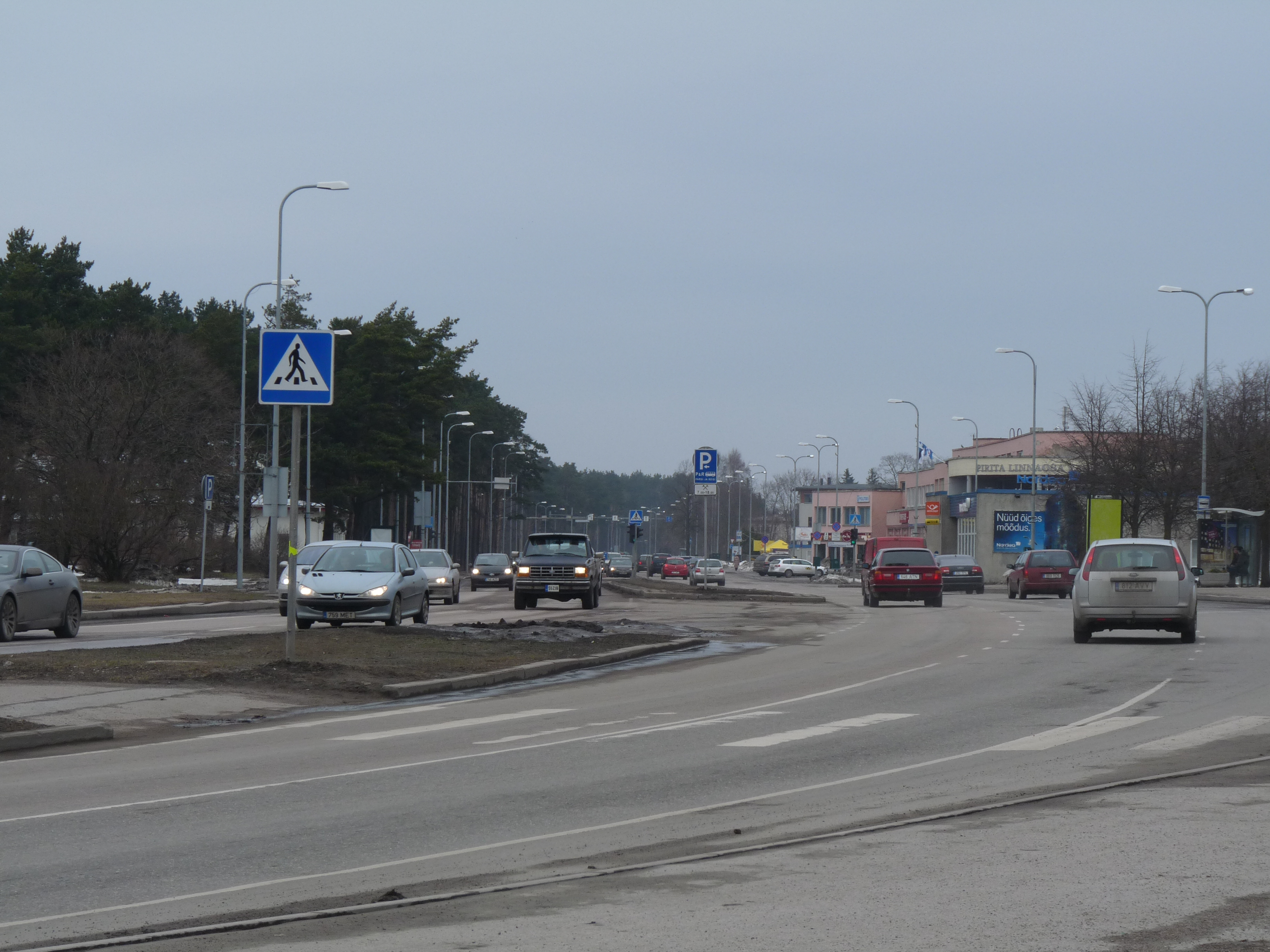
In Pirita

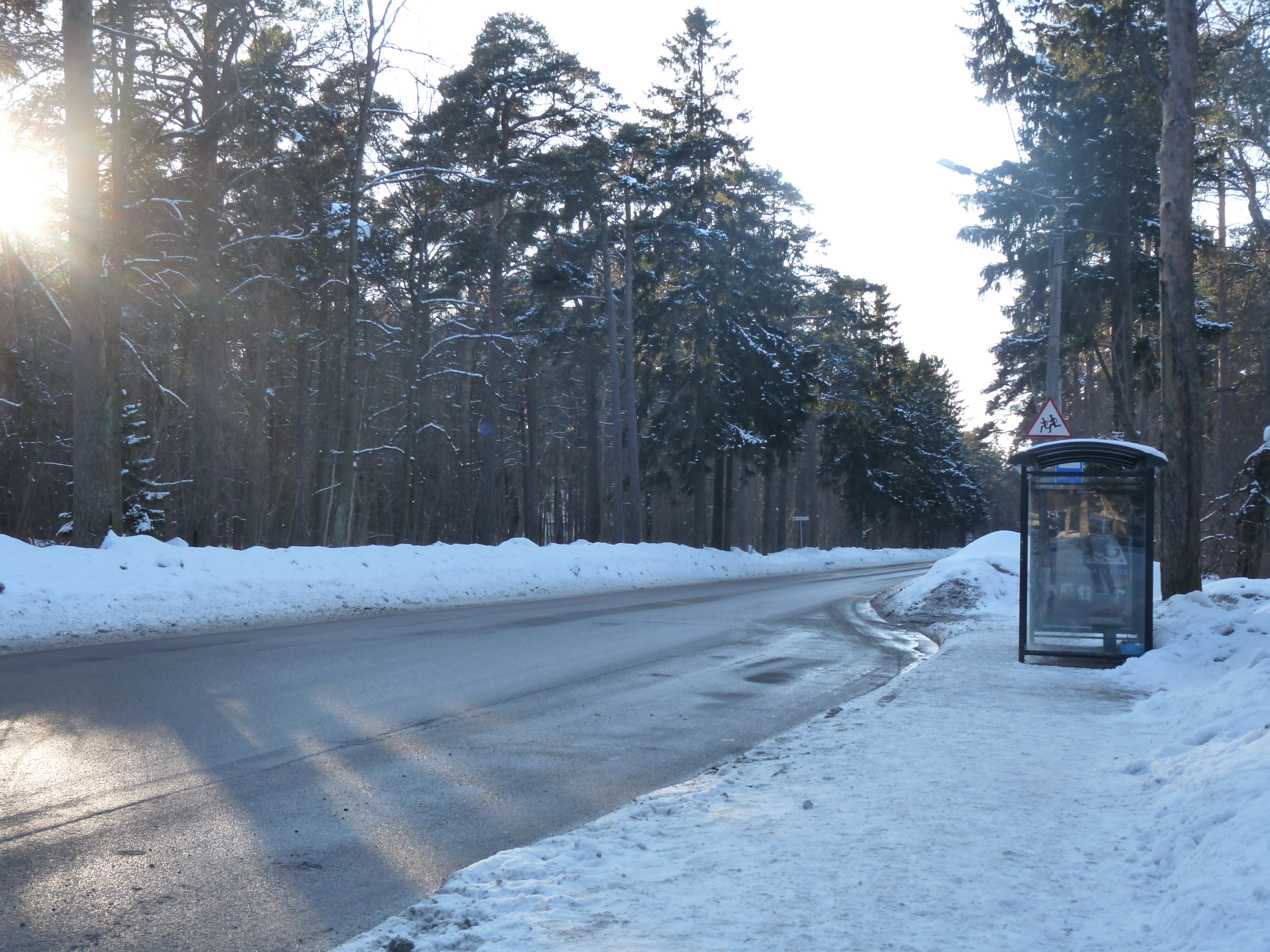
In Kose

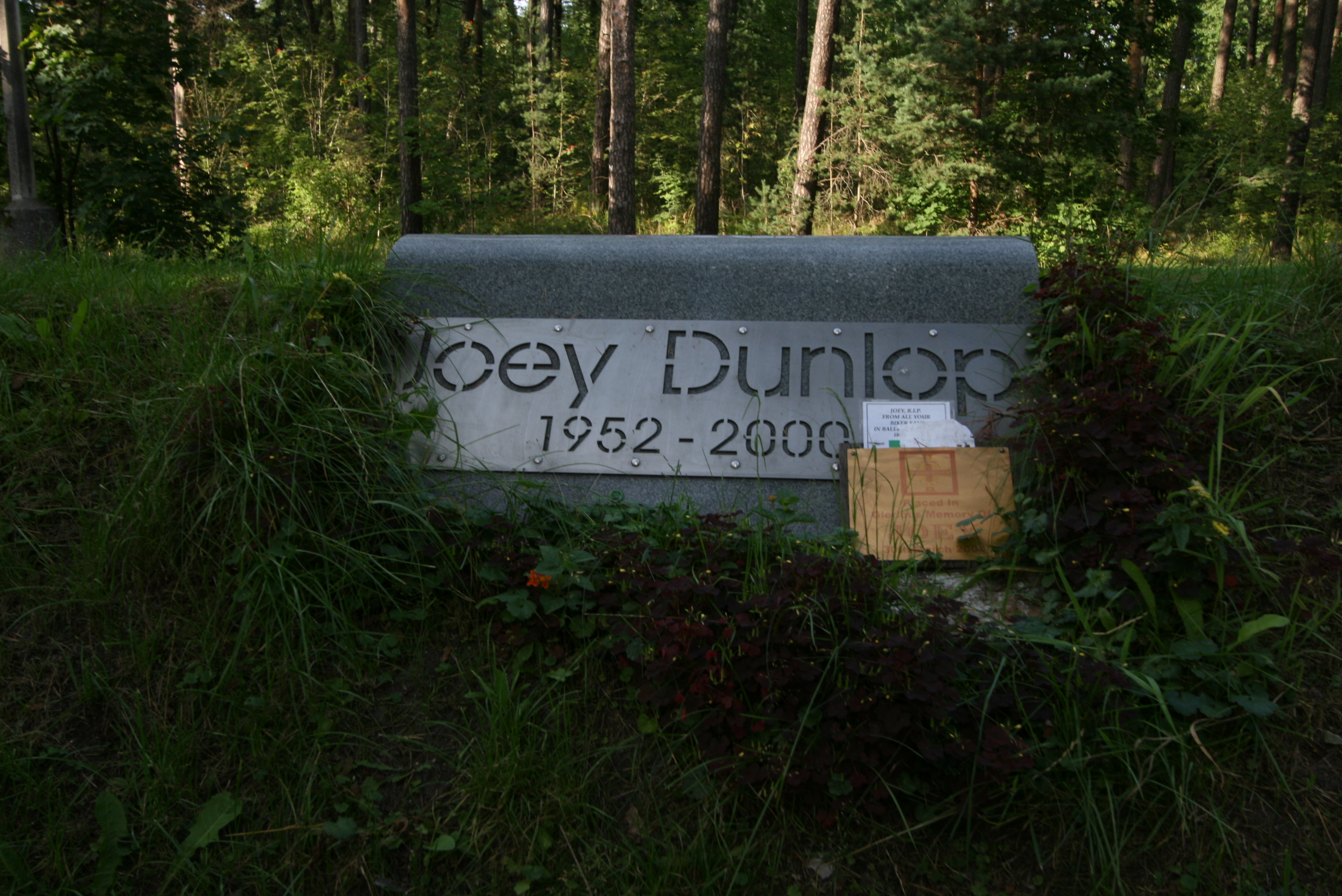
Memorial of Joey Dunlop.

== Lap records ==
The fastest official race lap records at the Pirita-Kose-Kloostrimetsa Circuit are listed as:

Category	Time	Driver	Vehicle	Event
Kalevi Circuit (1965–2006): 6.026 km (3.744 mi)
Superbikes	2:08.832	Hanno Velt	Kawasaki Ninja ZX-7RR	2004 Kalevi Suursõit Motorcycle Race
Supersport	2:16.689	Joel Vides	Kawasaki Ninja ZX-6RR	2004 Kalevi Suursõit Motorcycle Race
125cc	2:26.70	Nigel John	Honda RS125R	2001 Kalevi Suursõit Motorcycle Race
Formula Three	2:27.0	Leo Kinnunen	Tecno	1969 Kalevi F3 Race
