= 1936 Hörkenloppet =

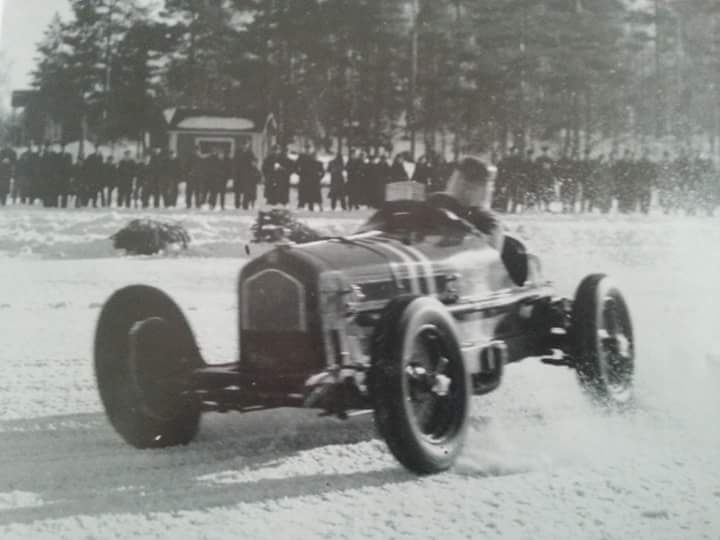
- Winner Bjørnstad

Race details
- Date: 16 February 1936
- Official name: I Hörkenloppet
- Location: Hörken, Grängesberg
- Course: Ice circuit
- Course length: 1.200 km (0.745 miles)
- Distance: 10 laps, 12.003 km (7.458 miles)

Podium
First	(Norway) Eugen Bjørnstad	Alfa Romeo
Second	(Sweden) Helmer Carlsson	Bugatti
Third	(Sweden) Karl-Gustav Sundstedt	Bugatti

The 1936 Hörkenloppet was a Grand Prix motor race held on 16 February 1936. The race was a part of the 1936 Grand Prix season as a non-championship race. The race was won by Eugen Bjørnstad in an Alfa Romeo 8C 2300.

== Results ==
Pos	No	Driver	Constructor	Laps	Time/Retired
1	11	(Norway) Eugen Bjørnstad	Alfa Romeo	10	11'04.3
2	12	(Sweden) Helmer Carlsson	Bugatti	10	11'34.6
3	15	(Sweden) Karl-Gustav Sundstedt	Bugatti	10	11'47.3
4	13	(Finland) Karl Ebb	Mercedes-Benz	10	11'59.0
5	16	(Sweden) Adolf Westerblom	Amilcar	10	12'16'15
6	14	(Finland) Emil Elo	Bugatti	10	12'53.0
Ret	17	(Sweden) Per-Viktor Widengren	Alfa Romeo	1	Accident

== Earlier ==
Bjørnstad and his Alfa also won the ice race the previous hear held in March 1935, with around 12 000 spectators. The 1500 meter track was circled 15 times, which for Bjørnstad took 16,30 minutes (average of 82 kph). The race had Widengren on second in an Alfa Romeo, and H. Karlsson in an Amilcar in third place.
