= 1954 Davis Cup Europe Zone =

International tennis competition

Details
- Duration: 30 April 1954 – 26 July 1954
- Teams: 23
- Categories: 1954 Davis Cup Europe Zone; 1954 Davis Cup America Zone

Champion
- Winning nation: Sweden; Qualified for: 1954 Davis Cup; Inter-Zonal Final

The Europe Zone was one of the two regional zones of the 1954 Davis Cup.

23 teams entered the Europe Zone, with the winner going on to compete in the Inter-Zonal Final against the winner of the America Zone. Sweden defeated France in the final, and went on to face the United States in the Inter-Zonal Final.

== Draw ==
First Round; 30 April–8 May
Denmark
bye
Luxembourg
bye
West Germany
bye
Hungary	3
New Zealand	2
India
bye
Austria	3
Ireland	2
France
bye
Finland	2
Norway	3
Netherlands	1
Spain	4
bye
Italy
Egypt	4
Turkey	1
bye
Sweden
Monaco	1
Yugoslavia	4
bye
Belgium
Switzerland	1
Brazil	3
bye
Great Britain

Second Round; 13–17 May
Mondorf-les-Bains, Luxembourg (clay)
Denmark	5
Luxembourg	0
Budapest, Hungary
West Germany	1
Hungary	4
Vienna, Austria
India	3
Austria	0
Oslo, Norway (clay)
France	5
Norway	0
Madrid, Spain (clay)
Spain	0
Italy	5
Cairo, Egypt (clay)
Egypt	0
Sweden	5
Brussels, Belgium
Yugoslavia	0
Belgium	5
Eastbourne, England (grass)
Brazil	1
Great Britain	4

Quarterfinals; 10–15 June
Copenhagen, Denmark (clay)
Denmark	4
Hungary	1
Paris, France (clay)
India	1
France	4
Solna, Sweden (clay)
Italy	0
Sweden	5
Scarborough, England (grass)
Belgium	3
Great Britain	2

Semifinals; 9–19 July
Copenhagen, Denmark (clay)
Denmark	1
France	4
Båstad, Sweden (clay)
Sweden	3
Belgium	2

Final; 24–26 July
Paris, France (clay)
France	0
Sweden	5

== First round ==
=== Hungary vs. New Zealand ===
Hungary
3
Budapest, Hungary
1–3 May 1954

New Zealand
2

			1	2	3	4	5
1	(Hungary) (New Zealand)	András Ádám-Stolpa; John Barry	6; 0	3; 6	6; 3	8; 6
2	(Hungary) (New Zealand)	József Asbóth; Jeff Robson	6; 3	4; 6	6; 2	6; 0
3	(Hungary) (New Zealand)	András Ádám-Stolpa / Antal Jancsó; Mark Otway / Jeff Robson	1; 6	1; 6	6; 2	2; 6
4	(Hungary) (New Zealand)	József Asbóth; John Barry	6; 4	7; 5	6; 2
5	(Hungary) (New Zealand)	András Ádám-Stolpa; Mark Otway	3; 6	2; 6	2; 6

=== Austria vs. Ireland ===
Austria
3
Vienna, Austria
30 April–2 May 1954

Ireland
2

			1	2	3	4	5
1	(Austria) (Republic of Ireland)	Franz Saiko; Vivian Gotto	6; 2	6; 1	6; 4
2	(Austria) (Republic of Ireland)	Hans Redl; Guy Jackson	6; 3	9; 7	4; 6	6; 5		retired
3	(Austria) (Republic of Ireland)	Hans Redl / Franz Saiko; Vivian Gotto / Guy Jackson	3; 6	1; 6	6; 3	3; 6
4	(Austria) (Republic of Ireland)	Franz Saiko; Guy Jackson	7; 5	6; 4	6; 2
5	(Austria) (Republic of Ireland)	Hans Redl; Vivian Gotto	3; 6	6; 4	6; 4	6; 3

=== Finland vs. Norway ===
Finland
2
Helsinki, Finland
6–8 May 1954
Clay

Norway
3

			1	2	3	4	5
1	(Finland) (Norway)	Sakari Salo; Rolf Pape	7; 5	6; 8	6; 2	6; 4
2	(Finland) (Norway)	Lars-Henrik Krause; Finn Søhol	2; 6	4; 6	3; 6
3	(Finland) (Norway)	Curt Lincoln / Sakari Salo; Nils-Erik Hessen / Rolf Pape	5; 7	4; 6	6; 4	2; 6
4	(Finland) (Norway)	Lars-Henrik Krause; Rolf Pape	1; 6	3; 6	2; 6
5	(Finland) (Norway)	Sakari Salo; Finn Søhol	6; 4	6; 2	6; 3

=== Netherlands vs. Spain ===
Netherlands
1
Mets Tennis Club, Scheveningen, Netherlands
30 April–2 May 1954
Clay

Spain
4

			1	2	3	4	5
1	(Netherlands) (Spain)	Ludwig Krijt; Emilio Martínez del Rey	3; 6	0; 6	3; 6
2	(Netherlands) (Spain)	Fred Dehnert; Carlos Ferrer	5; 7	1; 6	1; 6
3	(Netherlands) (Spain)	Fred Dehnert / Boebi van Meegeren; José María Draper / Carlos Ferrer	4; 6	3; 6	4; 6
4	(Netherlands) (Spain)	Fred Dehnert; Emilio Martínez del Rey	3; 6	3; 6	6; 3	8; 6	3; 6
5	(Netherlands) (Spain)	Ludwig Krijt; José María Draper	6; 4	4; 6	6; 3	6; 4

=== Egypt vs. Turkey ===
Egypt
4
Cairo, Egypt
30 April–2 May 1954

Turkey
1

			1	2	3	4	5
1	(Egypt) (Turkey)	Adli El Shafei; Suzan Gürel	6; 1	6; 0	6; 2
2	(Egypt) (Turkey)	Adel Ismail; Nazmi Bari	5; 7	6; 3	6; 0	6; 4
3	(Egypt) (Turkey)	Donald Acobas / Adel Ismail; Nazmi Bari / Suzan Gürel	6; 1	6; 1	6; 3
4	(Egypt) (Turkey)	Donald Acobas; Suzan Gürel	5; 7	5; 7	7; 5	6; 2	5; 7
5	(Egypt) (Turkey)	Adel Ismail; Behbut Cevanşir	6; 2	6; 2	6; 0

=== Monaco vs. Yugoslavia ===
Monaco
1
Monte Carlo, Monaco
1–3 May 1954

Yugoslavia
4

			1	2	3	4	5
1	(Monaco) (Socialist Federal Republic of Yugoslavia)	Aleco Noghès; Josip Palada	4; 6	2; 6	1; 6
2	(Monaco) (Socialist Federal Republic of Yugoslavia)	Georges Pasquier; Vladimir Petrović	1; 6	5; 7	5; 7
3	(Monaco) (Socialist Federal Republic of Yugoslavia)	Aleco Noghès / Georges Pasquier; Josip Palada / Vladimir Petrović	2; 6	2; 6	7; 9
4	(Monaco) (Socialist Federal Republic of Yugoslavia)	Georges Pasquier; Ilija Panajotović	1; 6	3; 6	7; 5	6; 4	6; 4
5	(Monaco) (Socialist Federal Republic of Yugoslavia)	Aleco Noghès; Ivko Plećević	2; 6	3; 6	2; 6

=== Switzerland vs. Brazil ===
Switzerland
1
Montreux, Switzerland
30 April–2 May 1954

Brazil
3

			1	2	3	4	5
1	(Switzerland) (Brazil)	Erwin Balestra; Bob Falkenburg	2; 6	5; 7	4; 6
2	(Switzerland) (Brazil)	Paul Blondel; Armando Vieira	1; 6	2; 6	3; 6
3	(Switzerland) (Brazil)	Jean-Pierre Blondel / Paul Blondel; Bob Falkenburg / Armando Vieira	6; 3	8; 6	4; 6	3; 6	6; 2
4	(Switzerland) (Brazil)	Erwin Balestra; Armando Vieira	2; 6	1; 6	3; 6
5	(Switzerland) (Brazil)	Paul Blondel; Fabio Guimarães	0; 6	5; 6				not completed

== Second round ==
=== Luxembourg vs. Denmark ===
Luxembourg
0
Mondorf-les-Bains, Luxembourg
14–16 May 1954
Clay

Denmark
5

			1	2	3	4	5
1	(Luxembourg) (Denmark)	Gaston Wampach; Torben Ulrich	4; 6	4; 6	0; 6
2	(Luxembourg) (Denmark)	Géza Wertheim; Kurt Nielsen	2; 6	0; 6	0; 6
3	(Luxembourg) (Denmark)	Gaston Wampach / Géza Wertheim; Kurt Nielsen / Torben Ulrich	4; 6	7; 9	0; 6
4	(Luxembourg) (Denmark)	Gaston Wampach; Kurt Nielsen	3; 6	1; 6	2; 6
5	(Luxembourg) (Denmark)	Géza Wertheim; Torben Ulrich	0; 6	2; 6	3; 6

=== Hungary vs. West Germany ===
Hungary
4
Budapest, Hungary
14–16 May 1954

West Germany
1

			1	2	3	4	5
1	(Hungary) (West Germany)	József Asbóth; Ernst Buchholz	6; 2	3; 6	6; 3	10; 8
2	(Hungary) (West Germany)	András Ádám-Stolpa; Engelbert Koch	3; 6	6; 4	6; 2	6; 1
3	(Hungary) (West Germany)	Antal Jancsó / István Sikorszki; Ernst Buchholz / Horst Hermann	2; 6	4; 6	5; 7
4	(Hungary) (West Germany)	József Asbóth; Horst Hermann	7; 5	6; 3	6; 0
5	(Hungary) (West Germany)	Antal Jancsó; Ernst Buchholz	6; 0	6; 1	6; 4

=== Austria vs. India ===
Austria
0
Vienna, Austria
14–16 May 1954

India
3

			1	2	3	4	5
1	(Austria) (India)	Hans Redl; Naresh Kumar	6; 4	3; 6	4; 6	5; 7
2	(Austria) (India)	Franz Saiko; Ramanathan Krishnan	0; 6	2; 6	5; 7
3	(Austria) (India)	Hans Redl / Franz Saiko; Naresh Kumar / Narendra Nath	3; 6	3; 6	4; 6
4	(Austria) (India)	Franz Saiko; Naresh Kumar						not played
5	(Austria) (India)	Hans Redl; Ramanathan Krishnan						not played

=== Norway vs. France ===
Norway
0
Oslo, Norway
14–16 May 1954
Clay

France
5

			1	2	3	4	5
1	(Norway) (France)	Nils-Erik Hessen; Jean-Claude Molinari	3; 6	6; 3	3; 6	2; 6
2	(Norway) (France)	Rolf Pape; Robert Haillet	5; 7	2; 6	6; 4	4; 6
3	(Norway) (France)	Nils-Erik Hessen / Rolf Pape; Jean Ducos de la Haille / Paul Rémy	4; 6	2; 6	4; 6
4	(Norway) (France)	Nils-Erik Hessen; Robert Haillet	4; 6	3; 6	4; 6
5	(Norway) (France)	Rolf Pape; Jean-Claude Molinari	3; 6	3; 6	7; 5	6; 8

=== Spain vs. Italy ===
Spain
0
Real Club de la Puerta de Hierro, Madrid, Spain
15–17 May 1954
Clay

Italy
5

			1	2	3	4	5
1	(Spain) (Italy)	Carlos Ferrer; Orlando Sirola	1; 6	6; 8	5; 7
2	(Spain) (Italy)	Emilio Martínez del Rey; Marcello del Bello	2; 6	5; 7	3; 6
3	(Spain) (Italy)	Jaime Bartroli / Carlos Ferrer; Marcello del Bello / Giovanni Cucelli	3; 6	3; 6	7; 5	4; 6
4	(Spain) (Italy)	Carlos Ferrer; Nicola Pietrangeli	4; 6	3; 6	6; 2	2; 6
5	(Spain) (Italy)	Emilio Martínez del Rey; Orlando Sirola	2; 6	6; 4	4; 6	4; 6

=== Egypt vs. Sweden ===
Egypt
0
Gezira Sporting Club, Cairo, Egypt
14–16 May 1954
Clay

Sweden
5

			1	2	3	4	5
1	(Egypt) (Sweden)	Adel Ismail; Sven Davidson	4; 6	4; 6	4; 6
2	(Egypt) (Sweden)	Adli El Shafei; Lennart Bergelin	0; 6	2; 6	1; 6
3	(Egypt) (Sweden)	Donald Acobas / Adel Ismail; Lennart Bergelin / Sven Davidson	2; 6	3; 6	6; 3	2; 6
4	(Egypt) (Sweden)	Adel Ismail; Lennart Bergelin	1; 6	3; 6	3; 6
5	(Egypt) (Sweden)	Adli El Shafei; Sven Davidson	0; 6	0; 6	1; 6

=== Belgium vs. Yugoslavia ===
Belgium
5
Brussels, Belgium
14–16 May 1954

Yugoslavia
0

			1	2	3	4	5
1	(Belgium) (Socialist Federal Republic of Yugoslavia)	Jacques Brichant; Ilija Panajotović	6; 1	6; 4	6; 4
2	(Belgium) (Socialist Federal Republic of Yugoslavia)	Philippe Washer; Vladimir Petrović	6; 3	6; 1	6; 3
3	(Belgium) (Socialist Federal Republic of Yugoslavia)	Jacques Brichant / Philippe Washer; Josip Palada / Vladimir Petrović	6; 4	6; 2	6; 2
4	(Belgium) (Socialist Federal Republic of Yugoslavia)	Jacques Brichant; Vladimir Petrović	6; 0	7; 5	6; 2
5	(Belgium) (Socialist Federal Republic of Yugoslavia)	Philippe Washer; Ilija Panajotović	6; 0	6; 4	6; 1

=== Great Britain vs. Brazil ===
Great Britain
4
Devonshire Park Lawn Tennis Club, Eastbourne, England
13–17 May 1954
Grass

Brazil
1

			1	2	3	4	5
1	(United Kingdom) (Brazil)	Tony Mottram; Bob Falkenburg	8; 6	6; 4	6; 0
2	(United Kingdom) (Brazil)	Geoffrey Paish; Armando Vieira	6; 8	7; 5	4; 6	2; 6
3	(United Kingdom) (Brazil)	Tony Mottram / Geoffrey Paish; Bob Falkenburg / Armando Vieira	5; 7	6; 1	6; 2	6; 1
4	(United Kingdom) (Brazil)	Tony Mottram; Armando Vieira	6; 3	6; 4	6; 3
5	(United Kingdom) (Brazil)	Gerald Oakley; Bob Falkenburg	6; 1	5; 7	6; 2	4; 6	6; 4

== Quarterfinals ==
=== Denmark vs. Hungary ===
Denmark
4
Copenhagen, Denmark
11–15 June 1954
Clay

Hungary
1

			1	2	3	4	5
1	(Denmark) (Hungary)	Torben Ulrich; András Ádám-Stolpa	6; 3	6; 3	4; 6	1; 6	5; 7
2	(Denmark) (Hungary)	Kurt Nielsen; József Asbóth	6; 0	6; 4	6; 1
3	(Denmark) (Hungary)	Kurt Nielsen / Torben Ulrich; Antal Jancsó / István Sikorszki	5; 7	6; 2	6; 1	6; 4
4	(Denmark) (Hungary)	Kurt Nielsen; András Ádám-Stolpa	4; 6	6; 2	6; 3	6; 3
5	(Denmark) (Hungary)	Torben Ulrich; József Asbóth	0; 6	7; 5	6; 3	6; 2

=== France vs. India ===
France
4
Stade Roland Garros, Paris, France
11–13 June 1954
Clay

India
1

			1	2	3	4	5
1	(France) (India)	Robert Haillet; Ramanathan Krishnan	6; 4	6; 4	8; 6
2	(France) (India)	Paul Rémy; Naresh Kumar	6; 3	6; 4	6; 1
3	(France) (India)	Jean Ducos de la Haille / Paul Rémy; Naresh Kumar / Narendra Nath	6; 2	6; 2	3; 6	7; 5
4	(France) (India)	Jean-Claude Molinari; Ramanathan Krishnan	4; 6	4; 6	2; 6
5	(France) (India)	Robert Haillet; Naresh Kumar	3; 6	9; 11	6; 4	8; 6	6; 0

=== Sweden vs. Italy ===
Sweden
5
Solna Tennisstadion, Solna, Sweden
10–12 June 1954
Clay

Italy
0

			1	2	3	4	5
1	(Sweden) (Italy)	Sven Davidson; Marcello del Bello	6; 1	6; 2	6; 2
2	(Sweden) (Italy)	Lennart Bergelin; Nicola Pietrangeli	7; 5	6; 1	3; 6	6; 4
3	(Sweden) (Italy)	Lennart Bergelin / Sven Davidson; Marcello del Bello / Giovanni Cucelli	4; 6	7; 5	2; 6	6; 4	6; 3
4	(Sweden) (Italy)	Sven Davidson; Nicola Pietrangeli	6; 4	2; 6	6; 4	6; 1
5	(Sweden) (Italy)	Lennart Bergelin; Orlando Sirola	6; 2	6; 3	2; 6	6; 1

=== Great Britain vs. Belgium ===
Great Britain
2
Yorkshire Lawn Tennis Club, Scarborough, England
10–12 June 1954
Grass

Belgium
3

			1	2	3	4	5
1	(United Kingdom) (Belgium)	Tony Mottram; Jacques Brichant	6; 4	3; 6	7; 5	2; 6	5; 7
2	(United Kingdom) (Belgium)	Geoffrey Paish; Philippe Washer	3; 6	0; 6	4; 6
3	(United Kingdom) (Belgium)	Tony Mottram / Geoffrey Paish; Jacques Brichant / Philippe Washer	6; 1	7; 5	6; 3
4	(United Kingdom) (Belgium)	Geoffrey Paish; Jacques Brichant	6; 1	7; 5	6; 3
5	(United Kingdom) (Belgium)	Tony Mottram; Philippe Washer	5; 7	4; 6	4; 6

== Semifinals ==
=== Denmark vs. France ===
Denmark
1
Copenhagen, Denmark
9–12 July 1954
Clay

France
4

			1	2	3	4	5
1	(Denmark) (France)	Torben Ulrich; Paul Rémy	7; 5	6; 1	3; 6	8; 10	1; 6
2	(Denmark) (France)	Kurt Nielsen; Robert Haillet	1; 6	9; 7	6; 4	7; 5
3	(Denmark) (France)	Kurt Nielsen / Torben Ulrich; Jean Ducos de la Haille / Paul Rémy	2; 6	10; 12	3; 6
4	(Denmark) (France)	Torben Ulrich; Robert Haillet	3; 6	6; 2	5; 7	3; 6
5	(Denmark) (France)	Kurt Nielsen; Paul Rémy	3; 6	7; 9	2; 6

=== Sweden vs. Belgium ===
Sweden
3
Båstad Tennis Stadium, Båstad, Sweden
17–19 July 1954
Clay

Belgium
2

			1	2	3	4	5
1	(Sweden) (Belgium)	Sven Davidson; Jacques Brichant	6; 3	6; 3	4; 6	6; 4
2	(Sweden) (Belgium)	Lennart Bergelin; Philippe Washer	4; 6	5; 7	4; 6
3	(Sweden) (Belgium)	Sven Davidson / Torsten Johansson; Jacques Brichant / Philippe Washer	6; 3	6; 8	3; 6	9; 7	6; 3
4	(Sweden) (Belgium)	Lennart Bergelin; Jacques Brichant	7; 5	8; 6	5; 7	2; 6	8; 10
5	(Sweden) (Belgium)	Sven Davidson; Philippe Washer	7; 5	5; 7	8; 6	6; 2

== Final ==
=== France vs. Sweden ===
France
0
Stade Roland Garros, Paris, France
24–26 July 1954
Clay

Sweden
5

			1	2	3	4	5
1	(France) (Sweden)	Robert Haillet; Lennart Bergelin	6; 4	5; 7	6; 3	3; 6	0; 6
2	(France) (Sweden)	Paul Rémy; Sven Davidson	1; 6	6; 3	3; 6	4; 6
3	(France) (Sweden)	Jean Ducos de la Haille / Paul Rémy; Sven Davidson / Torsten Johansson	3; 6	4; 6	6; 3	7; 9
4	(France) (Sweden)	Paul Rémy; Lennart Bergelin	2; 6	3; 6	8; 6	4; 6
5	(France) (Sweden)	Robert Haillet; Sven Davidson	4; 6	4; 6	6; 4	3; 6
