= P. G. Cristea =

"The winning crew: At the wheel - The articles author" (Petre Trucu Cristea)

Petre G. Cristea (31 January 1909 – 6 July 1995) is considered by many to be Romania's best racing driver, winner of the 1936 Monte Carlo Rally.

Cristea was born in Bucharest, Romania.

Having a passion for motor vehicles, Cristea forged his ID card in 1925 and obtained his driving licence even though he was only 16 and a half. He started racing in 1930 and entered his first Rallye Automobile Monte Carlo in 1931, finishing 11th with his teammate, driving a Dodge Victory Six. He pursued his driving career in parallel with joining the Bucharest Polytechical University, of which he dropped out after 3 years for medical reasons. He entered the 1934 and 1935 Monte Carlo Rallies, finishing 18th and 15th driving a modified Ford V8 in both rallies.

After these progresses, Cristea, together with Ion Zamfirescu, a motorcycling champion, decided to modify a Ford V8 in order to attempt a top finish in the 1936 Monte Carlo Rally. To help him, Ford Romania gave him an already competitive Ford V8, which he heavily tuned up: he only kept from the original car the radiator's mask, the engine hood, the headlights, the fenders, the windshield and the dashboard. He modified the engine, which received a British-made cylinder head which reduced the compression ratio, he replaced the Delco ignition with a Vertex-Scintila magneto and replaced the stock carburettor with a double Weber carburettor taken from Maserati, he reinforced the chassis, changed the shocks with some Lincoln provenance, more rigid shocks, obtained a rigid transmission by obtaining the current effect of the limited slip differential and transformed the car's body into a roadster's body. When the car was finished, he stated that he couldn't possibly take any more weight off his car. Together with his teammate Ion Zamfirescu and his mechanic Gogu Constantinescu he started the rally from Athens and arrived to Monte Carlo without accumulating any penalty points (like other 15 crews). The winner was going to be selected after a slalom contest, which Cristea won 0.4 seconds ahead of Frenchman Laury Schell, driving a more powerful Delahaye. This was Ford's first win at Monte Carlo and Romania's only victory in the Principality. The following year, he won the Monte Carlo Rally, but he was disqualified because his back fenders were illegal (they did not fully covered the wheels). In 1939, he won a sports car event at the Nürburgring in Germany. In the post-war period, Cristea only competed in local races and hillclimbing events in Romania.

During his career, Cristea raced in 80 competitions (of which 35 were international ones) and had 56 podium finishes (30 wins, 20 second places and 6 third places).

After ending his driving career, Cristea founded the Autoturism (Car) magazine in 1969, today owned by the Romanian Auto Club and wrote several reference books including Cum să devii campion (How to Become a Champion), Arta de a conduce automobilul (The Art of Driving The Car), Practica automobilului (The Practice of Car), Motorul de automobil (The engine of the automobile). He also wrote Dicționar tehnic auto în 7 limbi (Dictionary of Automotive Terms in 7 Languages - English, French, German, Italian, Romanian, Russian and Spanish) with Carol Szabados. Practica automobilului , a best seller, was published in four editions; the book is recognized as the "bible" of the Romanian automotive technology and is widespread in many libraries of automotive enthusiasts.

Cristea died in Bucharest on 6 July 1995, aged 89.
