= Karl Ebb =

Finnish skier, athlete and racing driver (1896–1988)

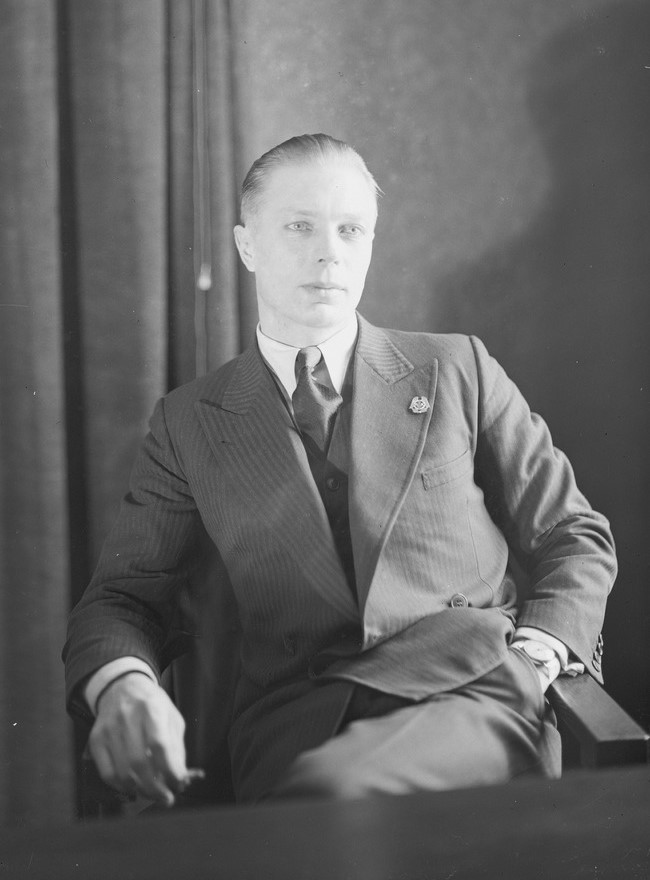
Ebb in 1931

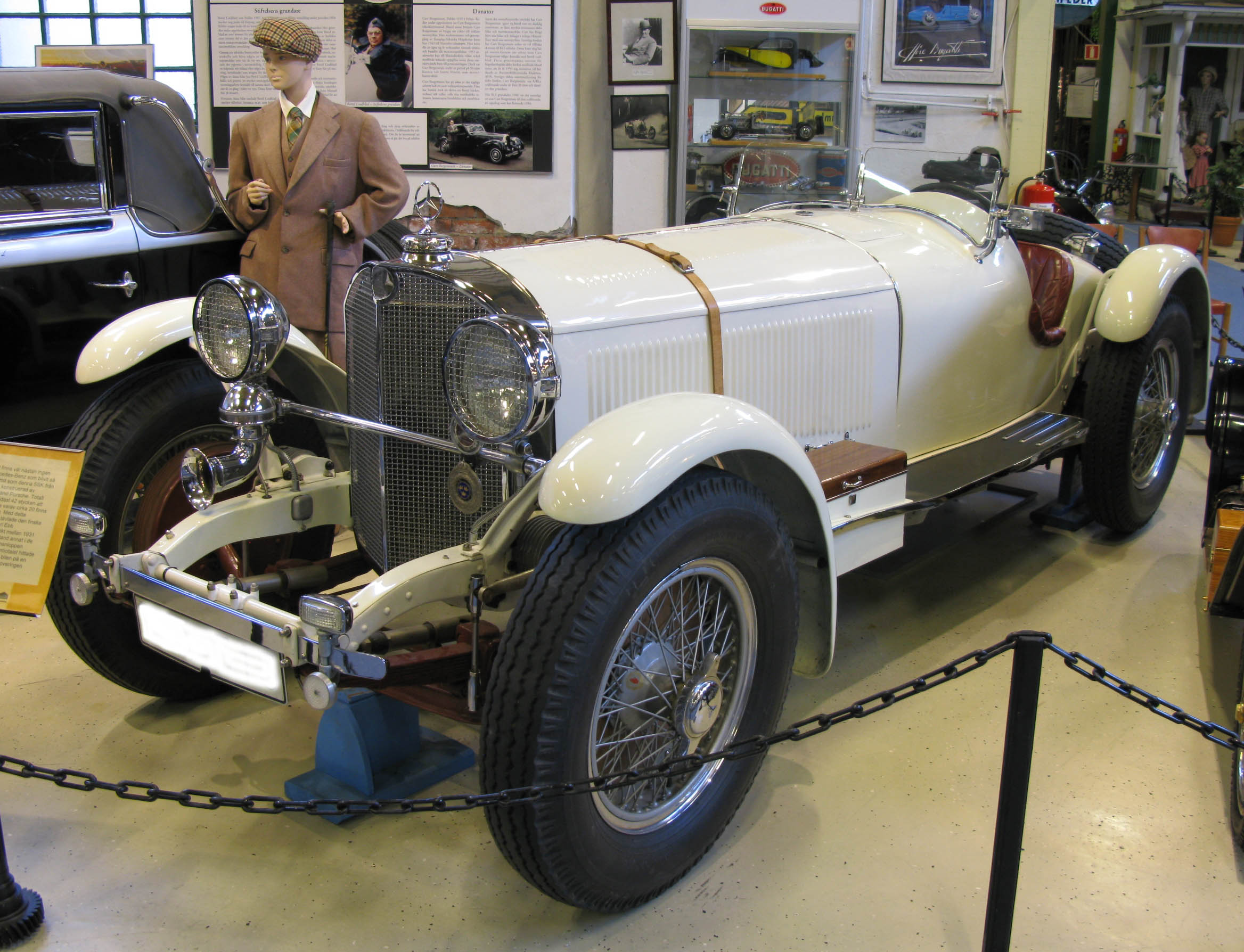
Ebb's Mercedes-Benz SSK raced in the 1930s

Karl Alfred "Kalle" Ebb (5 September 1896 – 2 August 1988) was an athlete and racing driver. He represented Finland at the Summer Olympics in athletics and was Finland's first internationally successful driver.

Born in Turku, he gained selection for Finland at the 1924 Summer Olympics. He competed in the 3000 metres steeplechase and placed fifth, while his more celebrated compatriots Ville Ritola and Elias Katz took the top two spots. He was a versatile athlete and competed nationally in numerous disciplines, including cycling, swimming, and alpine skiing.

In his thirties he began to compete in top level Northern European motor races, driving a Mercedes-Benz SSK. His best results included wins at the 1931 Swedish Winter Grand Prix, the Eläintarhan ajot in 1933 and 1935, the 1935 Estonian Grand Prix, and a runner-up finish to Per Victor Widengren at the 1935 Norwegian Grand Prix. He was the first Finnish driver to have success at international level. In 1936, he came in 4th with Mercedes Benz at the 1936 Hörkenloppet.

He founded the Finnish Slalom Association in 1941. He was also a businessman, forming a company with his first wife, Lempi Järvinen, which sold men's ties. The couple had a son, Heimo, who later died in World War II. Ebb remarried later in his life to Märtha Charlotte Reikko. He resided in Helsinki during much of his life and died there in 1988.
