= 1955 RAC Tourist Trophy =

1955 car race

Dundrod Circuit

The 1955 RAC Tourist Trophy took place on 17 September, on the roads around Dundrod, (County Antrim, Northern Ireland). It was also the fifth round of the F.I.A. World Sports Car Championship, and it was the first championship race following the tragedy at Le Mans. This event was marred by another three fatal accidents.

It was also the Golden Jubilee year for the RAC Tourist Trophy. Going into the race, Ferrari were leading the Manufacturers Championship by four points from Jaguar, and victory for the Italian marque would have put them in a strong position to win a third successive title.

== Report ==
=== Entry ===
A grand total of 64 racing cars were registered for this event, of which 55 arrived for practice and qualifying. Scuderia Ferrari entered a pair of Ferrari 857 Monzas for regulars Eugenio Castellotti and Piero Taruffi, and Umberto Maglioli and Maurice Trintignant, alongside a 750 Monza for the partnership of Olivier Gendebien and Masten Gregory. Their closest championship rivals, Jaguar, brought just one D-Type to Northern Ireland for Mike Hawthorn and Desmond Titterington. Hoping to keep the championship alive, Officine Alfieri Maserati sent two of their 300S and an A6GCS over. Amongst their line-up were Jean Behra and Luigi Musso.

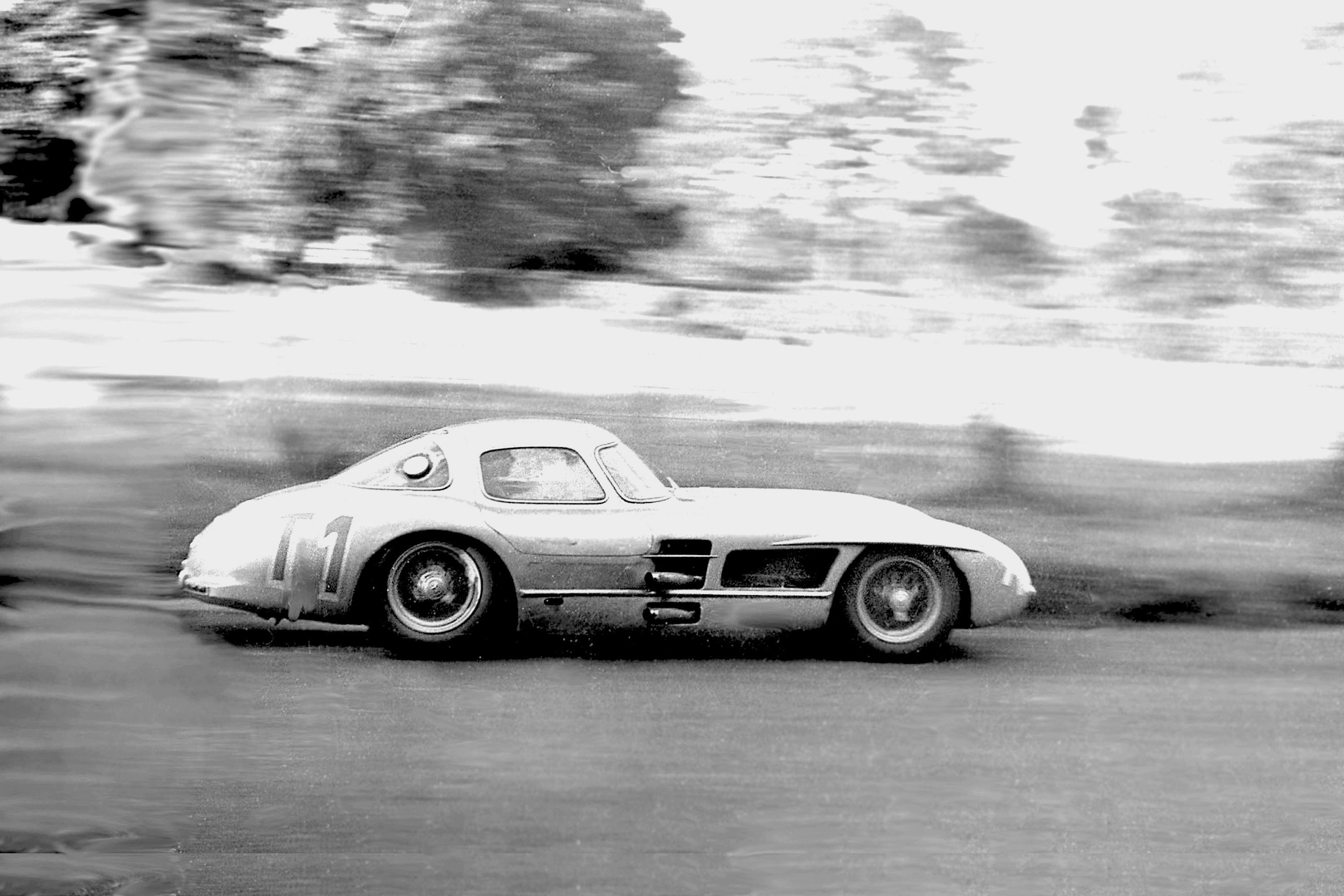
Mercedes 300 SLR "Uhlenhaut Coupe" Gullwing with No. T1

From West Germany, Daimler-Benz AG entered three of their Mercedes-Benz 300 SLRs to tackle the 7.41 mile circuit and the championships chances, which, after having skipped the first two rounds, having withdrawn at Le Mans, and cancellation of the 1000km Nürburgring, depended on winning the remaining two races 1-2. The cars were to be driven by 5 of the 6 drivers that were at Le Mans, but in new pairs: Juan Manuel Fangio and Karl Kling, Stirling Moss and John Fitch, and André Simon joined by team newcomer Wolfgang von Trips replacing the killed Levegh. Mercedes also brought two more 300 SLR as T-Cars (test cars or backup or spare cars): a regular open top with No. T2, and T1 on a "Uhlenhaut Coupe" Gullwing. This car version, originally built in 1954, was intended as an option for the 1956 season which Mercedes never competed. Only two Uhlenhaut Coupes were made, one was sold in 2022 for 135 Million Euro, as the world's most expensive car.

With works entries also from the likes of Aston Martin and Porsche, a total of fifteen manufacturers were represented in the field.

=== Qualifying ===
In qualifying, the number 10 Mercedes-Benz of Moss and Fitch emerged with the fastest lap. Next was the Hawthorn/Titterington Jaguar. A Ferrari was in third place, driven by Gendebien and Gregory, followed by the Mercedes of Fangio/Kling. The third Mercedes, of von Trips and Simon, would start the race from seventh position.

=== Race ===
Following an accident in practice, the Ferrari 857 Monza of Gendebien and Gregory did not start.

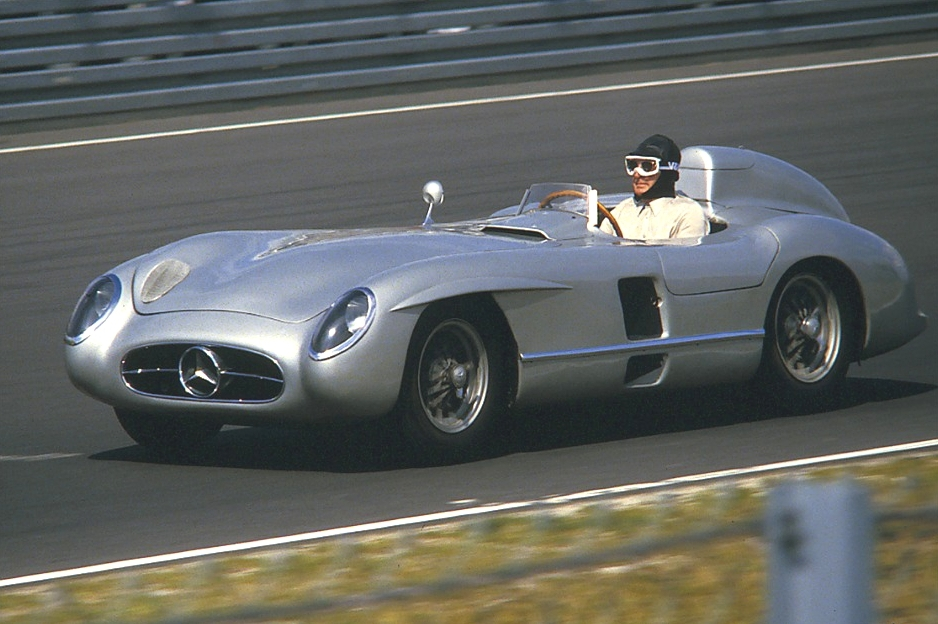
A Mercedes-Benz 300 SLR, similar to that driven by Moss/Fitch

The race was held over 84 laps of the 7.416 miles Dundrod Circuit, giving a distance of 622.936 miles (1002.518 km). The race started in warm, dry conditions, but it would not remain dry. Despite this, the German marque would finish in the first three places.

As the flag dropped, it was Moss who led the incredible array of cars around the County Antrim countryside. As there was an obvious threat of rain, this motivated the drivers to push a little harder at the beginning of the race than normal for a seven-hour event. But with so many cars, on such a tight and dangerous circuit, racing at high speed, on par with Le Mans, the TT was balancing between safety and catastrophic danger, with no margin for error. Mercedes driver John Fitch had already publicly criticized the safety of the Dundrod circuit.

While everyone was looking forward to a Mercedes/Jaguar duel, the Tourist Trophy was marred by tragedy, within the first few laps of the race. The Cooper-Climax T39 of Jim Mayers, who was sharing the car with Jack Brabham, hit a concrete pillar and the car immediately burst into a ball of flame. Mayers was killed instantly. The explosion caught out the approaching William Smith, at the wheel of a Connaught AL/SR, who ploughed straight into Mayers' car and perished a little while later.

Meanwhile, Moss was strong right from the start, as was Hawthorn. Hawthorn pushed his Jaguar D-Type as hard as he had when he won at Le Mans. He set the fastest lap of the race, averaging a speed of nearly 95 mph.

With a lead of one and a half minutes, the right rear tyre on Moss's 300 SLR began to throw its tread and tore through the rear-end bodywork. Incredibly, Moss managed to bring the car back to the pits, even with the damaged bodywork and shredded tyre. The mechanics set to work changing the wheel and pulling away some of the dangling bodywork. Having lost a lot of time, Moss and his co-driver Fitch drove flat-out in an effort to catch up with Hawthorn who was now in the lead.

As the rain began to fall, the accidents kept on coming. In the first two laps, a total of nine cars had been eliminated due to accidents, including the two which were fatal, and then on lap 35, Richard Manwaring lost control of his Elva-Climax Mk I and crashed off the track and a third driver lost his life. It was clear that the cars of that day were out-pacing the roads upon which they were competing, and the deaths of three more drivers shortly after the horrific events previously at Le Mans only added to the numbness for many. Incredibly dangerous, the combination of fast cars and narrow lanes still made for some entertaining action, and, despite the deaths, the crowd remained, watching Hawthorn and Titterington trying to hold off Moss and Fitch.

Once the repairs had been made to the number 10 300SLR, Moss and Fitch managed to bring the car up to second place overall behind the sole works Jaguar D-Type. Hawthorn and Titterington managed to hold off Mercedes, turning some truly fast laps around the Dundrod circuit.

With the finish in sight, the Jaguar remained in the lead ahead of the Mercedes, and despite everything that Moss and Fitch could do, the Jaguar stayed out of reach. But, all of a sudden, Hawthorn came to a screeching halt, just a few miles from the finish line. The Jaguar's engine had seized, leaving the Coventry marque with no hope of winning the race, or even finishing. Although slowed by the damage and weather conditions, Moss and Fitch had been unable to close down the gap enough to be able to challenge for the lead, but Mercedes were "gifted" the race.

As a result, car number 10 (Daimler-Benz AG), took an impressive victory, winning in a time of 7hrs 03:11 mins., averaging a speed of 88.321 mph. The retirement of the Jaguar led to Mercedes being able to take a sweep of the top three positions. Second place went to Fangio, for the second year in a row, and Kling, one lap down. The podium was complete by the other 300SLR, that of von Trips and Simon, two laps adrift. Meanwhile, the Aston Martin DB3S of Peter Walker and Dennis Poore was the best of the English entrants, finishing in fourth place, with the best of the works-Maserati further behind in fifth.

One of the outstanding drives of the race came from Peter Collins, whose Aston Martin DB3S was left stranded at the start due to a seized starter motor. Once the mechanics got the engine started, a furious Collins set off after the pack. After what must have been an astonishing first lap, he had climbed up to 14th. By lap 31, Collins had caught and passed Fangio for third before handing the car over to Tony Brooks, who was only able to complete a few laps before the Aston's engine expired.

== Official Classification ==
Class Winners are in Bold text.

Pos	No	Class	Driver		Entrant	Chassis	Laps	Reason Out
1st	**10**	**S3.0**	(United Kingdom) **Stirling Moss**	(United States) **John Fitch**	**Daimler-Benz AG**	**Mercedes-Benz 300 SLR**	**7hr 03:11, 84**	
2nd	9	S3.0	(Argentina) Juan Manuel Fangio	(West Germany) Karl Kling	Daimler-Benz AG	Mercedes-Benz 300 SLR	83	
3rd	11	S3.0	(West Germany) Wolfgang von Trips	(France) André Simon	Daimler-Benz AG	Mercedes-Benz 300 SLR	82	
DNF	1	S5.0	(United Kingdom) Mike Hawthorn	(United Kingdom) Desmond Titterington	Jaguar Cars Ltd.	Jaguar D-Type	81	Engine
4th	18	S3.0	(United Kingdom) Peter Walker	(United Kingdom) Dennis Poore	Aston Martin Ltd.	Aston Martin DB3S	81	
5th	15	S3.0	(Italy) Luigi Musso	(Italy) Franco Bordoni	Officine Alfieri Maserati	Maserati 300S	79	
6th	4	S3.0	(Italy) Eugenio Castellotti	(Italy) Piero Taruffi	Scuderia Ferrari	Ferrari 875 Monza	79	
7th	17	S3.0	(United Kingdom) Reg Parnell	(United Kingdom) Roy Salvadori	Aston Martin Ltd.	Aston Martin DB3S	78	
8th	5	S3.0	(Italy) Umberto Maglioli	(France) Maurice Trintignant	Scuderia Ferrari	Ferrari 875 Monza	79	
9th	**28**	**S1.5**	(United States) **Carroll Shelby**	(United States) **Masten Gregory**	**Huschke von Hanstein**	**Porsche 550 Spyder**	**75**	
10th	**41**	**S1.1**	(United Kingdom) **Mike MacDowel**	(United Kingdom) **Ivor Bueb**	**Cooper Car Co.**	**Cooper-Climax T39**	**74**	
11th	46	S1.1	(United Kingdom) Colin Chapman	(United Kingdom) Cliff Allison	Lotus Cars Ltd.	Lotus-Climax Mark IX	74	
12th	29	S1.5	(West Germany) Helmut Glöckler	(West Germany) Wolfgang Seidel	Porsche KG	Porsche 550 Spyder	74	
13th	7	S3.0	(Belgium) Jacques Swaters	(Belgium) Johnny Claes	Equipe Nationale Belge	Ferrari 750 Monza	73	
14th	19	S3.0	(United Kingdom) Raymond Flower	(United Kingdom) Mike Llewellyn	Raymond Flower	Austin-Healy 100S	71	
15th	47	S1.1	(United Kingdom) Dick Steed	(United Kingdom) Peter Scott-Russell	Richard Steed	Lotus-Climax Mark IX	71	
16th	30	S1.5	(West Germany) Richard von Frankenberg	(West Germany) Herbert Linge	Porsche KG	Porsche 550 Spyder	70	
17th	**50**	**S750**	(France) **Paul Armagnac**	(France) **Gérard Laureau**	**Ecurie Jeudy-Bonnet**	**D.B. HBR Panhard**	**70**	
18th	**56**	**S2.0**	(France) **André Loëns**	(Sweden) **Jo Bonnier**	**André Loëns**	**Maserati A6GCS**	**69**	
19th	49	S750	(France) Louis Cornet	(France) Claude Storez	Ecurie Jeudy-Bonnet	D.B. HBR Panhard	69	
20th	35	S1.5	(United Kingdom) Jack Fairman	(United Kingdom) Peter Wilson	MG Car Co.	MG EX182	69	
21st	23	S2.0	(United Kingdom) Wilbert Todd	(United Kingdom) Ian Titterington	Jasper B. Johnstone	Triumph TR2	68	
22nd	21	S2.0	(United Kingdom) Bob Dickson	(United Kingdom) W. Ken Richardon	Robert Dickson	Triumph TR2 Prototype	67	
23rd	26	S2.0	(United Kingdom) John Maurice Tew	(Republic of Ireland) Joe Kelly	J. Maurice Tew	Frazer Nash Le Mans Replica	66	
24th	51	S750	(France) Robert Mougin	(France) Guillaume Mercader	Ecurie Jeudy-Bonnet	D.B. HBR Panhard	66	
25th	27	S1.5	(United Kingdom) John Fisher	(United Kingdom) Ronnie Adams	Kieft Cars Ltd.	Kieft-Bristol	66	
26th	37	S1.5	(United Kingdom) Berwyn Baxter	(United Kingdom) Max Trimble	Kieft Cars Ltd.	Kieft-BMC	65	
DNF	14	S3.0	(France) Jean Behra	(Italy) Luigi Musso	Officine Alfieri Maserati	Maserati 300S	63	Accident
NC	38	S1.5	(United Kingdom) John Coombs	(United Kingdom) Ian Burgess	Lotus Cars Ltd.	Lotus-Connaught Mark VIII	55	
DNF	48	S1.1	(Republic of Ireland) Cecil Vard	(United Kingdom) Ken Rudd	Automobiles Fraser Nash Ltd.	DKW Sonderklasse	52	Engine
DNF	22	S2.0	(Republic of Ireland) Brian McCaldin	(United Kingdom) Charles Eyre-Maunsell	Jasper B. Johnstone	Triumph TR2	48	Unknown
DNF	3	S5.0	(United Kingdom) Peter Whitehead	(United Kingdom) Graham Whitehead	Peter Whitehead	Cooper-Jaguar T38	43	Chassis
DNF	16	S3.0	(United Kingdom) Peter Collins	(United Kingdom) Tony Brooks	Aston Martin Ltd.	Aston Martin DB3S	43	Con-rod bolt/Oil leak
DISQ	12	S3.0	(France) Henri de Barry		Ecurie Côte d'Azure	Mercedes-Benz 300 SL	39	Poor driving/too slow
DNF	44	S1.1	(United Kingdom) Otway Plunkett	(United Kingdom) Alan Rippon	Kieft Cars Ltd.	Kieft-Climax 1100	38	Accident
DNF	45	S1.1	(United Kingdom) Robbie MacKenzie-Low	(United Kingdom) Richard Mainwaring	Elva	Elva-Climax Mk. I	34	Fatal accident (Mainwaring)
DNF	24	S2.0	(Italy) Luigi Bellucci	(Republic of Ireland) Cecil Vard	Officine Alfieri Maserati	Maserati A6GCS	31	Engine
DNF	55	S750	(France) René Philippe Faure	(France) Philippe Duval	Automobili Stanguellini	Stanguellini 750 Sport	29	Unknown
DNF	34	S1.5	(United Kingdom) Ron Flockhard	(United Kingdom) John Lockett	MG Car Co.	MG EX182	23	Engine
DNF	54	S750	(France) Pierre Chancel	(France) René Chancel	Pierre Chancel	Panhard X88	22	Gearbox
DNF	36	S1.5	(United Kingdom) Ted Lund	(United Kingdom) Dickie Stoop	David Brown	Aston Martin DB3S	15	Final drive
DNF	2	S1.5	(United Kingdom) Bob Berry	(United Kingdom) Ninian Sanderson	Jack Broadhurst	Jaguar D-Type	1	Accident
DNF	20	S750	(United Kingdom) Lance Macklin	(United Kingdom) John Dalton	John Dalton	Austin-Healey 100S	1	Accident
DNF	25	S1.5	(United Kingdom) Ken Wharton	(Republic of Ireland) Cecil Vard	Automobiles Fraser Nash Ltd.	Fraser Nash Le Mans Replica Mk.II	1	Accident
DNF	31	S1.5	(West Germany) Friedrich Kretschmann (United Kingdom) Raymond Flower	(United Kingdom) Ernie McMillen	Raymond Flower	Porsche 550 Spyder	1	Accident
DNF	39	S1.5	(United Kingdom) William Smith	(United Kingdom) John Young	Connaught	Connaught AL/SR	1	Fatal accident (Smith)
DNF	40	S1.5	(United Kingdom) Peter Jopp	(United Kingdom) Mike Anthony	Lotus Cars Ltd.	Lotus-Climax Mark IX	1	Accident
DNF	42	S1.1	(United Kingdom) Jim Russell	(United Kingdom) Dennis Taylor	Cooper Car Co	Cooper-Climax T39	1	Accident
DNF	43	S1.1	(United Kingdom) Jim Mayers	(Australia) Jack Brabham	O'Shea Racing	Cooper-Climax T39	1	Fatal accident (Mayers)
DNS	6	S3.0	(Belgium) Olivier Gendebien	(United States) Masten Gregory	Scuderia Ferrari	Ferrari 750 Monza		Accident in practice
DNS	8	S3.0	(France) Jean Lucas	(Spain) Alfonso de Portago	Ecurie Bullfrog	Ferrari 750 Monza		

- Fastest Lap: Mike Hawthorn, 4:42.000secs (94.671 mph)

=== Class Winners ===
Class	Winners		
Sports 5000			no finishers
Sports 3000	10	Mercedes-Benz 300 SLR	Moss / Fitch
Sports 2000	56	Maserati A6GCS	Loëns / Bonnier
Sports 1500	28	Porsche 550 Spyder	Shelby / Gregory
Sports 1100	41	Cooper-Climax T3	MacDowel / Bueb
Sports 750	50	D.B. HBR Panhard	Armagnac / Laureau

== Standings after the race ==
Pos	Championship	Points
1	(Italy) Ferrari	19
2=	(United Kingdom) Jaguar	16
	(West Germany) Mercedes-Benz	16
4	(Italy) Maserati	13
5	(United Kingdom) Aston Martin	9

- Note: Only the top five positions are included in this set of standings. Championship points were awarded for the first six places in each race in the order of 8-6-4-3-2-1. Manufacturers were only awarded points for their highest finishing car with no points awarded for positions filled by additional cars. Only the best 4 results out of the 7 races could be retained by each manufacturer. Points earned but not counted towards the championship totals are listed within brackets in the above table.

World Sportscar Championship
Previous race: 24 Hours of Le Mans	1955 season	Next race: Targa Florio
