= 1955 24 Hours of Le Mans =

23rd 24 Hours of Le Mans endurance race

Previous: 1954	Next: 1956
Index: Races | Winners

The 1955 24 Hours of Le Mans was the 23rd 24 Hours of Le Mans and took place on 11 and 12 June 1955 on Circuit de la Sarthe. It was also the fourth round of the F.I.A. World Sports Car Championship. During the race, a crash killed driver Pierre Levegh and at least 81 spectators while injuring at least 120 others, making it the deadliest accident in motor racing history.

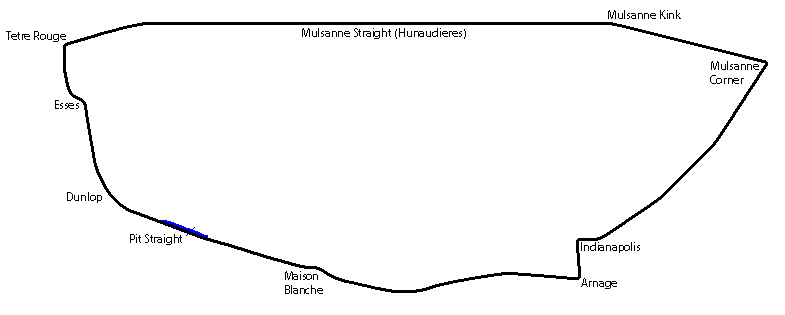
Le Mans in 1955

== Regulations ==
The Automobile Club de l'Ouest (ACO) again lifted the replenishment window (just changed the year before) of fuel, oil and water from 30 to 32 laps — just over 430 km (270 mi) — but by the same token, the maximum fuel allowance for all cars was increased to 200 L (44 imp gal; 53 US gal) for the race.

On the track, road improvements continued with the whole back section, from Tertre Rouge around to Maison Blanche, resurfaced.

== Entries ==
A total of 87 racing cars were registered for this event, of which 70 arrived for practice, to qualify for the 60 places on the starting grid, and included 15 factory teams.

Category	Classes	Entries
Large-engines	S-5000 / S-3000	26 +1 reserve
Medium-engines	S-2000 / S-1500	17 +7 reserves
Small-engines	S-1100 / S-750	17 +4 reserves

The battle between Coventry and Maranello of the previous year was joined by Mercedes-Benz, fresh from a triumphant 1-2 debut win in the Mille Miglia with their new 300 SLR backed up with a 1-2 Eifelrennen win at the Nürburgring, along with dark horses Cunningham, Aston Martin and Maserati, all with new 3-litre cars, as well as Talbot, Gordini, Cooper, and Austin-Healey. It led observers to anticipate a great contest.

Title-holders Ferrari arrived with the new 735 LM, powered by a straight-six engine derived from the previous year's Formula 1 car (and stepping away from the usual 12-cylinder Ferrari engines) producing a 360 bhp (270 kW). The works team mixed its current F1 drivers along with new talent: Eugenio Castellotti with Paolo Marzotto, Maurice Trintignant with Harry Schell and Umberto Maglioli drove with Phil Hill. Maglioli and Hill had been Ferrari rivals in the previous Carrera Panamericana. There were also two 3-litre 750 Monzas run by French private entries.

The original Mercedes-Benz 300 SL Gullwing (W194) had succeeded already in 1952 in international sports car racing, including Le Mans 24h and the Carrera Panamericana, but it came a year too soon for the first World Sportscar Championship. In the 1954 Formula One season1, Mercedes-Benz missed two rounds and debuted only in July. Despite entering three or four cars, team manager (Rennleiter) Alfred Neubauer had only one winning driver under contract, Juan Manuel Fangio, who already had been at the wheel of Silver Arrows in early 1951, when Mercedes was running pre-war cars at Argentinian Formula Libre races like the 1951 Buenos Aires GP. Sports car endurance racing required even more resources, and mostly two drivers per car, thus a return was postponed to the 1955 WSC season despite having the car already in 1954: the 300 SLR (W196S), which only shared name and engine capacity of 3.0 litre with the original carburetted 1952 300 SL, and with the fuel injected 300 SL Gullwing (W198) that already was on sale in 1954. The Mercedes-Benz W196 had been developed in two variants: for F1, a single seater with aerodynamic closed-wheel aluminium "Type Monza" streamliner body was made, and concurrently a two-seat sports car coupé, again with Gullwing doors, as the 1952 300 SL mostly had been raced as low drag closed coupe, except at the Nürburgring, where all cars were open. The road car had the trademark Gullwing doors, too, but only until 1957. Both early W196 variants had too much sheet metal, as the defeat at the 1954 British GP showed that a proper open wheeler was needed, and drivers asked for an open top sports car which already was tested in public in September 1954 at Monza where Fangio won the 1954 Italian GP. More adjustments were needed after the 1954 Spanish GP where the low-mounted air-intake picked up debris, which led to the intake's relocation atop the hood. Mercedes did not show up at the late November 1954 Carrera Panamericana, but young driver Hans Herrmann was allowed to race in a Porsche 550 with just 1500cc and finished 3rd.

The Mercedes factory team was present for the 1955 Argentine Grand Prix, won by Fangio in blistering heat, but inexplicably skipped the 1955 1000 km Buenos Aires, and then Fangio also won the 1955 Buenos Aires Grand Prix Formula Libre race with the 3.0 liter sports car engines mounted in all four F1 chassis. Capacity of the 8-cylinder was enlarged by longer stroke from 2.5 to 3.0 liter, still significantly smaller than competitors. Instead of the toxic special fuel mixture used in F1, it had to run on regular pump gas, with lower compression and lower revs. The fuel-injected 3-litre straight-8 was the most advanced of the entire field, producing 300 bhp (220 kW) later in the season. Mercedes also skipped Sebring to practise in Italy for the 1955 Mille Miglia in which four SLR were entered, two with passengers as the single lap around Northern Italy did not allow the usual pit stops for driver changes. Moss famously used Denis Jenkinson to copy the pace notes principle Mercedes had used at the 1952 Carrera, scoring another win, while Herrmann carried a mechanic to no avail, dropping out with a leaking fuel filler cap.

After two 1-2 wins at the fast Mille and at the twisty Nürburgring, the 300 SLR were rated by many experts as the best sports cars in the world. There was one Achilles' heel the team tried to address already in 1952: braking from the high speeds of Le Mans straights into the slow Mulsanne and Indianapolis corners. An air-brake flap was added to the Gullwing roof, but not permitted by the ACO. Average speeds in 1952 of 173 kp/h (107 mph) went up in 1955 to some 190 kp/h (118mph) in practise and even faster in the race, with Fangio being clocked at 292.21 kp/h (181.57 mph). Jaguar had won in 1953 using new disc brakes that barely faded. The inboard drum brakes of Mercedes, however, were only questionably adequate for the heavier chassis, facing the tough braking demands of Le Mans. To compensate, the now larger hand-operated air brake was added to the rear deck for high speed braking which was permitted after adding glass-covered viewing ports.

Team manager Alfred Neubauer had already guided Mercedes to the 1952 Le Mans win, but that was rather lucky as the original 300 SL Gullwing in 24h tuning delivered few more horses than the 150 in the two-door luxury sports tourer 300 S it was taken from. Three pre-war heroes and several barely known Germans were to be on the three car team, but only Hermann Lang raced and won after Rudolf Caracciola in Bern and Luigi Fagioli in Monaco suffered severe injuries. Thus Mercedes was all German in 1952, but quite the opposite in 1955. In a remarkably diplomatic move (recalling the war had only ended 10 years earlier), and with more funds, performance and credibility than in 1952, Neubauer assembled a more multi-national and talented team. Four factory pilots had started the year, with Stirling Moss added to Fangio, Kling and Herrmann, but at least six were needed. With Pierre Levegh nearly winning the 1952 race without handing over to a co-driver, Neubauer decided to offer him a future ride, and did so for 1955. American John Fitch already had been on the 1952 Carrera team. In the Mille Miglia, Kling crashed and broke his ribs, preventing him from racing in the 1955 Monaco GP, thus Frenchman André Simon was brought in. When Hans Herrmann got badly injured and was out for the year, Simon filled the gap. Belgian racing-journalist, class winner and future overall winner Paul Frère had originally been approached but signed to drive for Aston Martin, instead. For the 24 hour race, Neubauer paired his two best drivers Fangio and Moss in the lead car to prevent them racing each other. Kling was teamed up with Simon, and Fitch with Levegh.

Jaguar arrived with three works D-types. This year's model had engine power increased from 250 to 270 bhp (190 to 200 kW), for a top speed of almost 280 km/h (170 mph). The team consisted of 1953 winners Tony Rolt and Duncan Hamilton; up-and-coming English star Mike Hawthorn (stolen from Ferrari) paired with rookie Ivor Bueb; and Jaguar test driver Norman Dewis sharing the third car with Don Beauman. They were backed up by D-Types entered by Belgium's Ecurie Francorchamps and from American Briggs Cunningham's team.

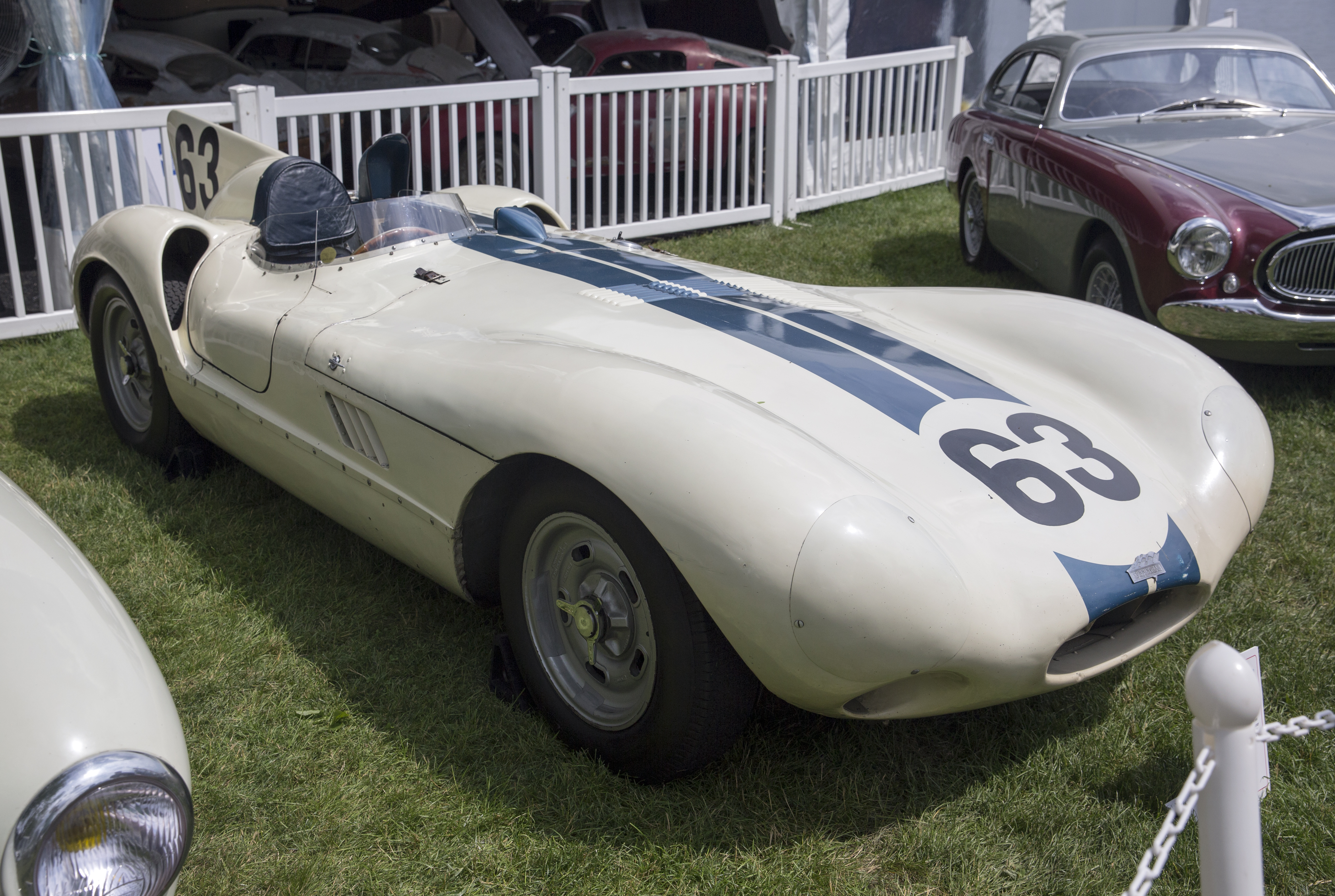
Cunningham C6-R, driven by Cunningham and Johnston. It wore #22 during the race and retired early.

Cunningham hedged his bets this year – along with the Jaguar he loaned 750 Monzas to French privateer Michel Pobejersky (racing as "Mike Sparken") and American Masten Gregory. He also brought (for the last time, as it happened) a new Cunningham C6-R, giving up on a big V8 Hemi to instead use an Indianapolis-style Offenhauser 3.0L straight-4. He and Sherwood Johnston would race it.

The Maserati team did make it this year – with a pair of their new 3.0L 300Ss, which had already shown promise at Sebring. They were run by the team's regular F1 drivers, one shared by Roberto Mieres and Cesare Perdisa, the other by Luigi Musso and endurance racing veteran Luigi "Gino" Valenzano. Maserati also ran a smaller A6GCS in the S-2000 class.

Louis Rosier's privateer Talbot did not make the start, so the large-engined French challenge this year came from Gordini with a 3-litre T24S for F1 drivers Jean Behra and Élie Bayol. Like Maserati, they also ran a smaller T20S in the S-2000 class.

There was great interest for British fans, aside from the Jaguar team. In total there were 27 British cars starting, nearly half the field. Aston Martin pared back its effort a bit, to just three DB3S (now with disc brakes and an improved 225 bhp (168 kW) 3-litre engine). They came with a good driver line-up: Peter Collins and Paul Frère, 1951 winner Peter Walker and Roy Salvadori, and rookies Tony Brooks and John Riseley-Prichard. They also persisted with the Lagonda project – the 4.5L V12 being biggest engine in the field. This year Reg Parnell was co-driven by Dennis Poore.

After boycotting the previous year's race, Austin-Healey returned with a single 100S prototype. Cooper brought two cars – one a Jaguar-engined T38, the other, a T39, with a Climax engine. In the S-2000 class, along with a pair each of Triumph TR2s and Frazer Nash Sebrings, Bristol was back, this time with its 450C open-top variant. To save pit-time, the team also pioneered a multi-barrel spanner to remove and re-apply all the wheelnuts together when changing the wheel. MG returned after 20 years with the EX.182 prototype – a 1.5L forerunner of the upcoming MGA roadster. Colin Chapman, racing with Scotsman Ron Flockhart arrived with his new Lotus 9 sports car – like the other small English firms Kieft, Cooper and Arnott, running the 1100cc Climax engine.

After a fortuitous class victory in 1954, Porsche arrived in force with a mix of works and (nominally) private entries: four Porsche 550 spyders in their usual S-1500 class, and two with smaller engines in the S-1100 classes. In contrast, after the despair of their 1954 race, OSCA only had a single privateer in the S-1500 class.

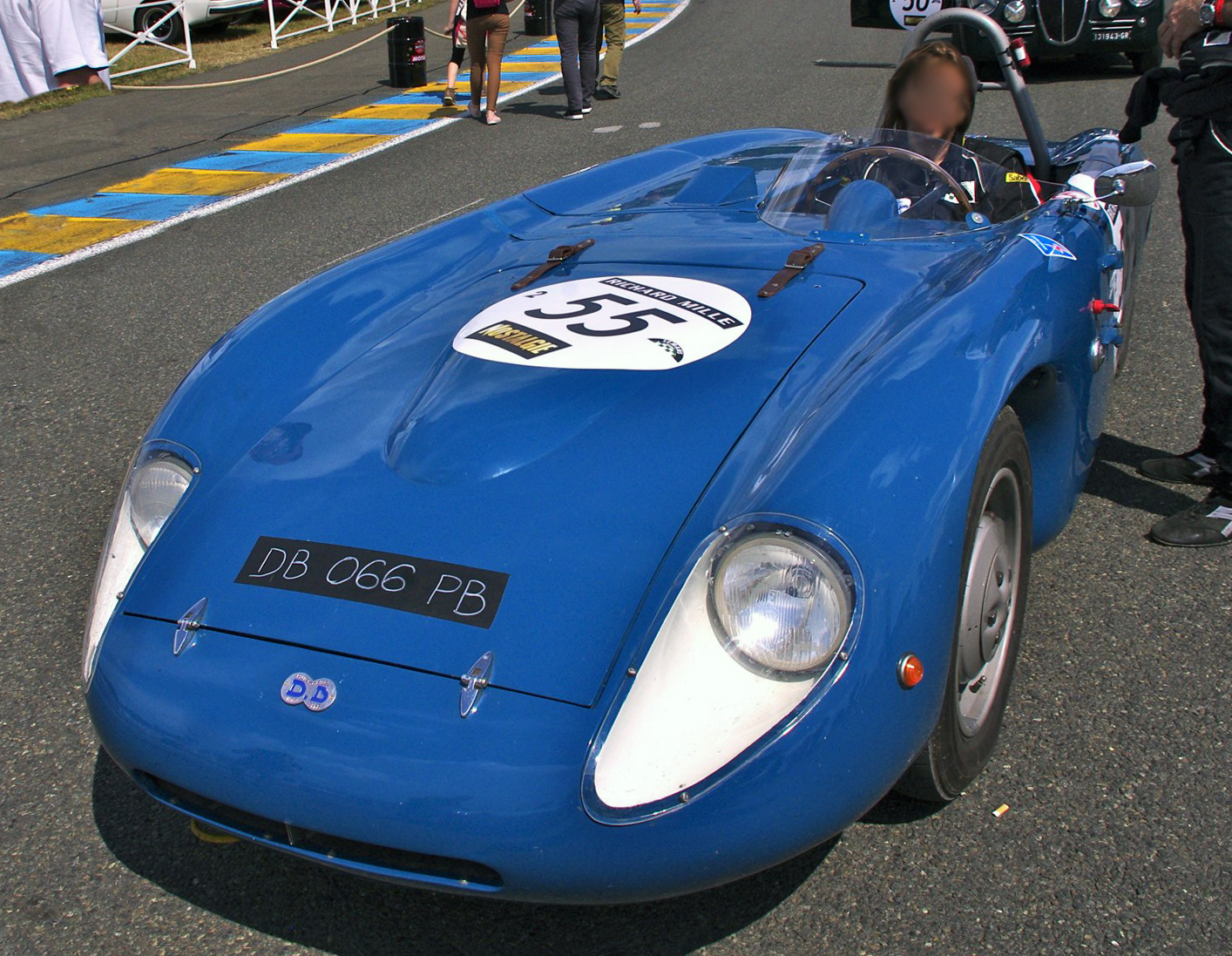
DB of Louis Héry and Georges Trouis. It wore #59 and finished 19th overall.

The smallest, S-750, class was again dominated by French cars, from Panhard, Monopole, DB (all with Panhard engines), and VP-Renault. Panhard also fielded two bigger, 850cc-engined, cars that had to run in the S-1100 class. However several Italian teams arrived to take on the French with entries from Moretti and Stanguellini. Perhaps the most unusual entry was the tiny catamaran-style Damolnar Bisiluro from Ufficine Nardi – where the driver sat in one boom and the engine and running gear was in the other.

== Practice ==
As expected, the Ferraris showed themselves to be extremely fast on a single lap, and Castellotti set the fastest official time, easily breaking the lap record and was a second quicker than Fangio in his Mercedes. But there were also a number of serious accidents during practice: Moss was leaving the pits just as the DB-Panhard of Claude Storez came in, the small car hit Jean Behra. While both cars were able to start the race, Behra had face and leg injuries that forced him out, to be replaced by reserve driver Robert Manzon. Coming into Maison Blanche, Behra's erstwhile teammate Élie Bayol in the new Gordini T24S came upon two spectators crossing the track. He swerved and rolled the car and was taken to hospital with a fractured skull and broken vertebrae; Peter Taylor was also severely injured when he crashed the new Arnott. Levegh came in after a close brush with a Gordini, commenting "We have to get some sort of signal system working. Our cars go too fast". Neubauer tried, unsuccessfully, to persuade the ACO to allow him to erect a small signalling tower at the top of pit-line for his team.

As a comparison, some of the lap-times recorded during practice were:

Position	Car	Driver(s)	Best Time
1	Ferrari 735 LM No. 4	Castellotti	4min 14sec
2	Mercedes-Benz 300SLR No. 19	Fangio	4min 15sec
3	Mercedes-Benz 300SLR No. 21	Kling	
4	Jaguar D-Type No. 6	Hawthorn	
5	Ferrari 735 LM No. 3	Maglioli / Hill	4min 21sec
-	Maserati 300S No. 16	Musso / Valenzano	4min 23sec
-	Gordini T20S No. 30	Ramos / Pollet	4min 47sec
-	Porsche 550 RS Spyder		4min 50sec
-	Panhard VM-5		< 4min 50sec

Over the flying kilometre on the Mulsanne straight, the following top speeds in practice and the race were recorded:

Car	Engine	Maximum Speed
Ferrari 735 LM	Ferrari 4.4L S6	291.2 km/h
Jaguar D-Type	Jaguar 3.4L S6	281.9 km/h
Mercedes-Benz 300SLR	Mercedes-Benz 3.0L S8	270.7 km/h
Cunningham C6-R	Offenhauser 3.0L S4	237.6 km/h
Aston Martin DB3S	Aston Martin 2.9L S6	236.8 km/h
Porsche 550 RS Spyder	Porsche 1.5L F4	225.3 km/h
D.B. HBR-MC	Panhard 745cc F2	170.8 km/h

== Race ==
=== Start ===
This year the honorary starter was Conte Aymo Maggi, the President and organiser of the Mille Miglia. Giovanni Moretti's two cars arrived on the start grid a few minutes after the 2pm deadline and were excluded from starting. It was Castellotti, by dint of being near the front of the grid formation, who was first under the Dunlop Bridge and leading the first lap, followed by Hawthorn in the Jaguar. Fangio's start was delayed when his trouser leg snagged on the gear shift lever, but he worked his way up the field to join Hawthorn and Castellotti. The crowd's expectations of a showdown between the three top marques were soon fulfilled as, by lap 4, the three manufacturers’ works cars filled the top 8 places – excepting Trintignant's Ferrari in the pits with an early issue. One of the first casualties was on lap 5 as the leaders started lapping the backmarkers – the tiny Nardi was literally blown off the road into a ditch by the slipstream of the bigger cars. The pace was furious but Castellotti managed to keep Hawthorn and Fangio at bay for the first hour. Behind them was Maglioli's Ferrari, the American Jaguar, the other pair of works Mercedes-Benz's and Jaguars and in 10th Mieres in the Maserati.

Finally, after 70 minutes, it was Castellotti's mistake braking for the Mulsanne corner that let the Jaguar and Mercedes through. Those two then set about pushing harder still, dropping the Ferrari and successively beating the lap record – broken ten times in the first two hours and finally claimed by Hawthorn on lap 28 – setting it over 7 seconds faster than the Ferrari's practice lap.

=== Disaster ===
At 6.20pm, at the end of lap 35 when the first pit-stops were due, the 1955 Le Mans disaster occurred. Having got the order from his Jaguar crew to pit, Hawthorn braked sharply in front of Lance Macklin's Austin-Healey. Macklin then braked hard, getting off the right-hand edge of the track and throwing up dust. Macklin's car then veered back to the centre of the track, into the path of Levegh's Mercedes-Benz, which was running 6th having just gone a lap down. Travelling at 150 mph, Levegh's right-front wheel rode up onto the left rear corner of Macklin's, launching the car into the air and rolling end over end for 80 metres over spectators.

The car slammed into a four-foot earthen embankment – the only barrier between the spectators and the track - and disintegrated. The momentum of the heaviest components of the car – the engine, radiator and front suspension - carried them into the crowd for almost 100 metres. Those who had climbed onto ladders and scaffolding to get a better view of the track found themselves in the direct path of the lethal debris. The remainder of the car, on the earth bank, exploded into flames, burning with extra heat from its magnesium-alloy body. Levegh was killed instantly in the impact.

Race officials kept the race running, reasoning that if the huge crowd tried to leave en masse it would clog the roads, severely restricting access for medical and emergency crews trying to save the injured. Hawthorn, after being initially waved through his stop because of the confusion and potential danger, stopped along with the other lead cars for their scheduled pit stops and driver changes. Then thirteen minutes later, the MG of Dick Jacobs lost control exiting Maison Blanche, rolled and landed upside-down, burning. Jacobs survived the accident, but was severely injured and never raced again. Phil Hill, now driving Maglioli's Ferrari noted "At this point I was numbed by it all, shocked that all this could be happening at once and on my first-ever Ferrari racing lap of Le Mans. But then Stirling Moss went by me like a streak in his Mercedes 300 SLR, and that woke me up. That was a lesson I never forgot, which was that when something happens, get on the gas."

His teammates, Castellotti and Marzotto in the No. 4 Ferrari 735 LM, were the first of the leaders to falter: a slipping clutch eventually led to engine failure just before 8pm. Maglioli and Hill took up their third place until they too were stopped about 11pm when a rock pierced their radiator.

=== Night ===
With the driver changes from Hawthorn to Bueb and Fangio to Moss, the Jaguar team's talent was outmatched and the Mercedes team was able to extend its lead. At midnight, the Mercedes of Fangio/Moss was leading Hawthorn/Bueb by two laps, themselves two laps ahead of the Kling/Simon Mercedes and the other two works Jaguars all scrapping between themselves. Further back were Musso's Maserati, Collins’ Aston Martin, the Belgian Jaguar and the remaining big Ferrari fighting its way up from the back of the field. The race remained competitive, however with Hawthorn behind the wheel, as the lead was whittled down to 1½ laps by 2am. The other Mercedes still trailed the Hawthorn/Bueb car by two laps. Race spotters' reports on the Mercedes' braking points led the Jaguar team to believe that their brakes were weakening.

After the catastrophic accident, John Fitch, picking up on the early media reports, had urged the Mercedes team to withdraw from the race – he could see that win or lose, it would be a PR disaster for the company. Mercedes team manager Alfred Neubauer had already reached the same conclusion but did not have the authority to make such a decision. After an emergency meeting of the company directors in Stuttgart, Neubauer finally got the call approving the team's withdrawal just before midnight. Waiting until 1.45am, when many spectators had left, he stepped onto the track and quietly called his cars into the pits, at the time running 1st and 3rd. The public address made a brief announcement regarding their retirement. Chief engineer Rudolf Uhlenhaut, born and raised in England, went to the Jaguar pits to ask if the Jaguar team would respond in kind, out of respect for the accident's victims. Jaguar team manager Lofty England declined.

Meanwhile, Don Beauman had planted his works Jaguar in the sandtrap at Arnage. Having taken over an hour to dig it out, he had just got it free after 10 pm when Colin Chapman came off at Arnage and smacked the Jaguar. Chapman quickly reversed and got going again only to be disqualified because he had restarted without the marshal's permission.

The Aston Martins had been running to a strict lap-time set by team manager John Wyer, but keeping just in the top-10. Either side of midnight two of them were sidelined by mechanical issues. They followed their sister-Lagonda that had run out of fuel from a loose-fitting filler-cap.

Soon after the Mercedes-Benz team withdrawal, the last Ferrari (that of Trintignant / Schell) retired with engine trouble, having fought back up to 10th position. With no further challenge from Mercedes-Benz or Ferrari, Jaguar were holding a comfortable 1–2, although Rolt and Hamilton were having problems with their gearbox.

In the 2-litre category, the Maserati and Gordini had been battling each other, well ahead of the British cars and just outside the top-10. The Gordini was delayed by a defective battery, but the Maserati then retired just after midnight with ignition failure. Even at this stage though, the two works 1500cc Porsches were ahead of these bigger cars. Further back, third in class, was the Belgian-entered Porsche, giving a first Le Mans drive to future endurance great Olivier Gendebien.

=== Morning ===
Dawn broke under a heavy, overcast sky and by 6am it had started to rain. Soon after, the class-leading Gordini pitted with a holed radiator just two laps before its replenishment window. Trying to inch its way round the circuit it over-heated and had to retire. The S-2000 class fell into the lap of the Bristols. Around 8am, the second Jaguar's gearbox finally seized and they were out. With gloomy weather and little enthusiasm now for the race, the running order saw few changes. Second place remained in contention until late morning as the Valenzano/Musso Maserati, five laps down from the leader, was pushing hard and being chased by the Collins/Frère Aston Martin until the Maserati retired with a seized transmission. About the same time the Cunningham also retired: never in the running, lapping in 13th behind the smaller Porsches and Bristols, it had lost its lower gears the night before.

A special mass was held in the morning in the Le Mans Cathedral for the first funerals of the accident victims.

=== Finish ===
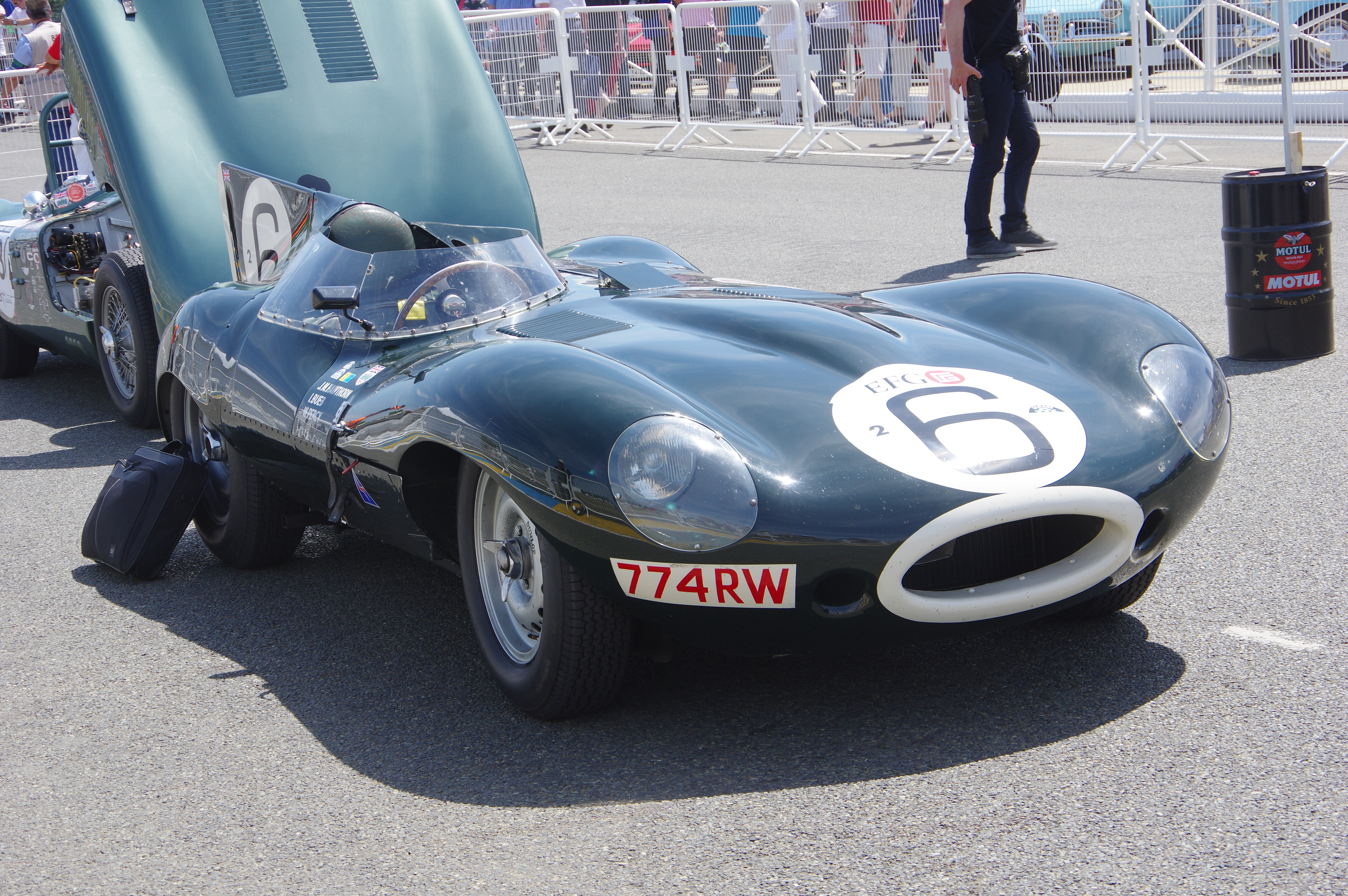
The winning Jaguar D-Type of Hawthorn and Bueb

The race finished in drizzle. Bueb, in his first event for the Coventry marque, handed over the leading Jaguar to Hawthorn for the final 15 minutes, and they coasted to a comfortable victory, completing a record-breaking 306 laps and finishing five laps ahead of the Aston Martin (achieving their best result to date, and only finish since 1951). The podium was completed by the Belgian pair of Johnny Claes and Jacques Swaters, in their yellow Ecurie Francorchamps Jaguar D-Type. Although 11 laps (nearly 150 km) behind the winners, they were again a model of reliability.

Porsche had its best finish yet with the trio of 1.5 litre Porsche 550 Spyders finishing fourth, fifth and sixth with Helmut Polensky and Richard von Frankenberg winning the S-1500 class, the Index of Performance, as well as the Biennial Cup. The Belgian Porsche had moved up the order late in the race to split the two works cars. Additionally the privateer Porsche comprehensively won the S-1100 class finishing nearly 40 laps ahead of the unclassified Cooper. The three-car Bristol team finished seventh, eighth and ninth, in formation for a consecutive year at the top of two-litre class. Managing director Sir George White donated the team's winnings to a charity for the disaster's victims. After their debacle of the previous year's race, the only Italian car to finish this year was the 1.5L OSCA. Two of the DB-Panhards were the only French cars to finish in the normally reliable small-car classes. For the first time none of the Cunningham team cars finished.

Despite the disaster and poor weather, there were a number of new records set: Both first and second beat the old distance record – and five new class records were set. In fact, the two leading 1.5L Porsches both went further than the overall distance covered by the 1952-winning Mercedes-Benz. The opening hours had also seen the lap record broken by a significant margin.

== Post-race and aftermath ==
The catastrophic crash, which came to be known as the 1955 Le Mans disaster, remains the deadliest accident in the history of motorsport. The actual death toll is uncertain, put at from 80 to 84, including Levegh, with many more than that number severely injured. Spurring mentions that the official report cites "Levegh" and 80 spectators were killed and 178 were injured.

Several Grand Prix and the next round of the 1955 World Sportscar Championship, the 28 August 1955 1000km at the Nürburgring, were cancelled, as was the Carrera Panamericana. The accident caused widespread shock and immediate bans on auto racing in some countries (e. g. Switzerland), while others did not react. A number of racing teams including Mercedes-Benz, MG and Bristol were disbanded and withdrawn from racing by the end of the season, with Mercedes management already having decided prior to the crash to divert resources to road car development when racing success has been achieved. The scale of the accident caused some drivers present, including Phil Walters (who had been offered a drive with Ferrari for the rest of the season), Sherwood Johnston, and John Fitch (after completing the season with Mercedes-Benz), to retire from racing. Fitch was coaxed out of retirement by his friend Briggs Cunningham to help the Chevrolet Corvette effort at Le Mans in 1960 and later worked to develop traffic safety devices including the sand-filled "Fitch barrels". Less than three months later, Lance Macklin decided to retire after being involved in a twin fatality accident during the 1955 RAC Tourist Trophy race at Dundrod Circuit. Juan Manuel Fangio never raced at Le Mans again.

Although Hawthorn was relieved to have gotten his first Le Mans victory, he was devastated by the tragedy. A press photo showed him smiling on the podium swigging from the victor's bottle of champagne, and the French press ran it with the sarcastic headline "Here's to You, Mr Hawthorn".

The official enquiry concluded that no one driver was to blame and that it was instead a tragic combination of circumstances that had caused the accident, including serious deficiencies in the track design and safety.

A few days after the race, a full ban on motor racing events was put into effect by the French government, pending the creation of new rules to ensure the safety of the sport. This complete ban was lifted on September 14, 1955. At this time, the Ministry of the Interior released new regulations for racing events, and codified the approval process that future racing events would need to follow. On the same day, the ACO announced their intent to hold the Le Mans race in 1956, and to make modifications to the Circuit de la Sarthe as necessary to adhere to the Ministry's new regulations. Before the 1956 event, the grandstands and pits were demolished, as well as straightening and widening the track at and approaching the pits, and realigning Dunlop Curve. They increased the separation between the road and the spectators including a wide ditch, and revised other hazardous stretches of the track. Track safety technology and practices evolved slowly until Formula 1 driver Jackie Stewart organized a concerted campaign to advocate for better safety measures 10 years later. Stewart's campaign gained momentum after the deaths of Lorenzo Bandini and Jim Clark.

== Official results ==
Results taken from Quentin Spurring's book, officially licensed by the ACO. Class Winners are in bold text.

Pos	Class	No	Team	Drivers	Chassis	Engine	Laps
1	**S** **5.0**	6	(United Kingdom) Jaguar Cars Ltd.	(United Kingdom) Mike Hawthorn (United Kingdom) Ivor Bueb	Jaguar D-Type	Jaguar 3.4L S6	307
2	**S** **3.0**	23	(United Kingdom) Aston Martin Lagonda Ltd	(United Kingdom) Peter Collins (Belgium) Paul Frère	Aston Martin DB3S	Aston Martin 2.9L S6	302
3	S 5.0	10	(Belgium) Ecurie Francorchamps	(Belgium) Jacques Swaters (Belgium) Johnny Claes	Jaguar D-Type	Jaguar 3.4L S6	296
4	**S** **1.5**	37	(West Germany) Porsche KG	(West Germany) Helmut Polensky (West Germany) Richard von Frankenberg	Porsche 550 RS Spyder	Porsche 1498cc F4	284
5	S 1.5	66; Reserve	(Belgium) Ecurie Belge / (France) Gustave Olivier	(West Germany) Wolfgang Seidel (Belgium) Olivier Gendebien	Porsche 550 RS Spyder	Porsche 1498cc F4	276
6	S 1.5	62	(West Germany) Porsche KG	(Germany) Helmut 'Helm' Glöckler (Guatemala) / (Czech Republic) Jaroslav Juhan	Porsche 550 RS Spyder	Porsche 1498cc F4	273
7	**S** **2.0**	34	(United Kingdom) Bristol Aeroplane Co.	(United Kingdom) Peter Wilson (United Kingdom) Jim Mayers	Bristol 450C	Bristol 1979cc S6	271
8	S 2.0	33	(United Kingdom) Bristol Aeroplane Co.	(United Kingdom) Mike Keen (United Kingdom) Tommy Line	Bristol 450C	Bristol 1979cc S6	270
9	S 2.0	32	(United Kingdom) Bristol Aeroplane Co.	(United Kingdom) Tommy Wisdom (United Kingdom) Jack Fairman	Bristol 450C	Bristol 1979cc S6	268
10	S 2.0	35	(United Kingdom) Automobiles Frazer Nash Ltd.	(France) Marcel Becquart (United Kingdom) Richard ‘Dickie’ Stoop	Frazer Nash Sebring	Bristol 1971cc S6	260
11	S 1.5	40	(United States) Edgar Fronteras (private entrant)	(Italy) Giulio Cabianca (Italy) Giuseppe Scorbati	O.S.C.A. MT-4	O.S.C.A. 1491cc S4	256
12	S 1.5	41	(United Kingdom) MG Cars Ltd.	(United Kingdom) Ken Miles (United Kingdom) John Lockett	MG EX.182	MG 1489cc S4	249
13	**S** **1.1**	49	(Germany) Porsche KG	(France) Auguste Veuillet (United States) Zora Arkus-Duntov	Porsche 550 RS Spyder	Porsche 1097cc F4	245
14	S 2.0	28	(United Kingdom) Standard Triumph Ltd.	(United Kingdom) Ninian Sanderson (United Kingdom) Bob Dickson	Triumph TR2	Triumph 1991cc S4	242
15	S 2.0	29	(United Kingdom) Standard Triumph Ltd.	(United Kingdom) Ken Richardson (United Kingdom) Bert Hadley	Triumph TR2	Triumph 1991cc S4	242
16	**S** **750**	63	(France) Ecurie Jeudy-Bonnet	(France) Louis Cornet (France) Robert Mougin	DB HBR-MC	Panhard 745cc F2	236
17	S 1.5	64	(United Kingdom) MG Cars Ltd.	(United Kingdom) Ted Lund (Switzerland) Hans Waeffler	MG EX.182	MG 1489cc S4	234
18	S 1.5	65	(France) Gustave Olivier (private entrant)	(France) Gonzague Olivier (West Germany) Josef Jeser	Porsche 550 RS Spyder	Porsche 1498cc F4	234
N/C *	S 2.0	68; Reserve	(United Kingdom) Standard Triumph Ltd.	(United Kingdom) Leslie Brooke (United Kingdom) Mortimer Morris-Goodall	Triumph TR2	Triumph 1991cc S4	214
19	S 750	59	(France) Ecurie Jeudy-Bonnet	(France) Louis Héry (France) Georges Trouis	DB HBR Spyder	Panhard 745cc F2	209
N/C *	S 1.1	47	(United Kingdom) Cooper Car Co.	(United Kingdom) John Brown (United Kingdom) Edgar Wadsworth	Cooper T39	Coventry Climax 1098cc S4	207

- Note *: Not Classified because of Insufficient distance, as car failed to cover 70% of its class-winner's distance.

== Did not finish ==
Pos	Class	No	Team	Drivers	Chassis	Engine	Laps	Reason
DNF	S 3.0	16	(Italy) Officine Alfieri Maserati	(Italy) Luigi Musso (Italy) Luigi "Gino" Valenzano	Maserati 300S	Maserati 3.0L S6	239	Gearbox (20hr)
DNF	S 3.0	22	(United States) Briggs Cunningham	(United States) Briggs Cunningham (United States) Sherwood Johnston	Cunningham C6-R	Offenhauser 2.9L S4	196	Piston (19hr)
DNF	S 5.0	7	(United Kingdom) Jaguar Cars Ltd.	(United Kingdom) Tony Rolt (United Kingdom) Duncan Hamilton	Jaguar D-Type	Jaguar 3.4L S6	186	Gearbox (16hr)
DNF	S 2.0	30	(France) Automobiles Gordini	(Brazil) Hermano da Silva Ramos (France) Jacques Pollet	Gordini T15S	Gordini 1987cc S8	145	Holed radiator (14hr)
DNF	S 750	52	(France) Société Monopole	(France) Jean Hémard (France) Pierre Flahault	Monopole X86	Panhard 745cc F2	145	Accident (23hr)
DNF	S 750	60	(Italy) Automobili Stanguellini	(France) René Philippe Faure (France) Pierre Duval	Stanguellini S750 Bialbero	Stanguellini 740cc S4	136	Ignition (17hr)
DNF	S 3.0	19	(Germany) Daimler-Benz AG	(Argentina) Juan Manuel Fangio (United Kingdom) Stirling Moss	Mercedes-Benz 300 SLR	Mercedes-Benz 3.0L S8	134	Withdrawn (10hr)
DNF	S 3.0	21	(Germany) Daimler-Benz AG	(Germany) Karl Kling (France) André Simon	Mercedes-Benz 300 SLR	Mercedes-Benz 3.0L S8	130	Withdrawn (10hr)
DNF	S 1.1	51	(France) Automobiles Panhard et Levassor	(France) René Cotton (France) André Beaulieux	Panhard VM-5	Panhard 850cc F2	108	Gearbox (13hr)
DNF	S 5.0	5	(Italy) Scuderia Ferrari	(France) Maurice Trintignant (United States) Harry Schell	Ferrari 735 LM	Ferrari 4.4L S6	107	Clutch (10hr)
DNF	S 5.0	8	(United Kingdom) Jaguar Cars Ltd.	(United Kingdom) Don Beauman (United Kingdom) Norman Dewis	Jaguar D-Type	Jaguar 3.4L S6	106	Accident (11hr)
DNF	S 3.0	24	(United Kingdom) Aston Martin Lagonda Ltd	(United Kingdom) Roy Salvadori (United Kingdom) Peter Walker	Aston Martin DB3S	Aston Martin 2.9L S6	105	Engine (10hr)
DNF	S 3.0	12	(France) "Heldé"	(France) "Heldé" (Pierre Louis-Dreyfus) (France) Jean Lucas	Ferrari 750 Monza	Ferrari 3.0L S4	104	Distributor (10hr)
DNF	S 750	58	(France) Ecurie Jeudy-Bonnet	(France) Paul Armagnac (France) Gérard Laureau	DB HBR-MC	Panhard 745cc F2	101	Wheel (23hr)
DSQ	S 1.1	48	(United Kingdom) Lotus Engineering	(United Kingdom) Colin Chapman (United Kingdom) Ron Flockhart	Lotus Mark IX	Coventry Climax 1098cc S4	99	reversed on track (12hr)
DNF	S 2.0	31	(Italy) Officine Alfieri Maserati	(Argentina) Carlo Tomasi (Italy) Francesco Giardini	Maserati 200S	Maserati 1986cc S4	96	Distributor (9hr)
DNF	S 1.1	50	(France) Automobiles Panhard et Levassor	(France) Pierre Chancel (France) Robert Chancel	Panhard VM-5	Panhard 850cc F2	94	Fuel system (11hr)
DNF	S 5.0	1	(United Kingdom) Aston Martin Lagonda Ltd	(United Kingdom) Reg Parnell (United Kingdom) Dennis Poore	Lagonda DP-166	Lagonda 4.5L V12	93	Out of fuel (8hr)
DNF	S 3.0	25	(United Kingdom) Aston Martin Lagonda Ltd	(United Kingdom) Tony Brooks (United Kingdom) John Riseley-Pritchard	Aston Martin DB3S	Aston Martin 2.9L S6	83	Battery (9hr)
DNF	S 3.0	27	(France) J.-P. Colas (private entrant)	(France) Jean-Paul Colas (France) Jacques Dewez	Salmson 2300S Cabriolet	Salmson 2.3L L4	82	Oil leak (9hr)
DNF	S 5.0	3	(Italy) Scuderia Ferrari	(Italy) Umberto Maglioli (United States) Phil Hill	Ferrari 735 LM	Ferrari 4.4L S6	76	Clutch (7hr)
DNF	S 1.5	38	(Switzerland) W. Ringgenberg (private entrant)	(Switzerland) Walter Ringgenberg (Switzerland) Hans-Jörg Gilomen	Porsche 550	Porsche 1498cc F4	65	Engine (8hr)
DNF	S 1.5	43	(United Kingdom) Connaught Engineering	(United Kingdom) Kenneth McAlpine (United Kingdom) Eric Thompson	Connaught AL/SR	Lea-Francis 1484cc S4	60	Engine (9hr)
DNF	S 5.0	4	(Italy) Scuderia Ferrari	(Italy) Eugenio Castellotti (Italy) Paolo Marzotto	Ferrari 735 LM	Ferrari 4.4L S6	52	Engine (5hr)
DNF	S 2.0	69	(France) A. Constantin (private entrant)	(France) Jacques Savoye (France) Jacques Poch	Constantin 203C Spyder	Peugeot 1425cc S4; Supercharged	52	Gearbox (9hr)
DNF	S 1.1	46	(United Kingdom) Kieft Cars Ltd.	(United Kingdom) Alan Rippon (United Kingdom) Ray Merrick	Kieft Sport	Coventry Climax 1098cc S4	47	Oil leak (6hr)
DNF	S 750	57	(France) Ecurie Jeudy-Bonnet	(France) René Bonnet (France) Claude Storez	D.B. HBR	Panhard 745cc F2	44	Distributor (9hr)
DNF	S 5.0	9	(United States) Briggs Cunningham	(United States) Phil Walters (United States) William "Bill" Spear	Jaguar D-Type	Jaguar 3.4L S6	43	Engine (Valve) (7hr)
DNF	S 5.0	11	(United Kingdom) Cooper Car Co	(United Kingdom) Peter Whitehead (United Kingdom) Graham Whitehead	Cooper T38	Jaguar 3.4L S6	38	Oil leak (4hr)
DNF	S 3.0	20	(Germany) Daimler-Benz AG	(France) "Pierre Levegh" (Pierre Bouillin) (United States) John Fitch	Mercedes-Benz 300 SLR	Mercedes-Benz 3.0L S8	34	Fatal accident (3hr)
DNF	S 2.0	36	(United Kingdom) Automobiles Frazer Nash Ltd.	(Republic of Ireland) Cecil Vard (Republic of Ireland) Dick Odlum	Frazer Nash Sebring	Bristol 1971cc S6	33	Engine (6hr)
DNF	S 750	53	(France) Société Monopole	(France) Francis Navarro (France) Jean de Montrémy	Monopole Sport X88	Panhard 745cc F2	30	Oil leak (6hr)
DNF	S 3.0	26	(United Kingdom) Lance Macklin (private entrant)	(United Kingdom) Lance Macklin (United Kingdom) Les Leston	Austin-Healey 100 S	BMC A90 2.7L S4	28	Accident damage (6hr)
DNF	S 1.5	42	(United Kingdom) MG Cars Ltd.	(United Kingdom) Dick Jacobs (Republic of Ireland) Joe Flynn	MG EX.182	MG 1489cc S4	27	Accident (6hr)
DNF	S 750	56	(France) Automobiles VP	(France) Yves Giraud-Cabantous (France) Yves Lesur	VP 166R	Renault 747cc S4	26	Engine (8hr)
DNF	S 3.0	15	(Italy) Officine Alfieri Maserati	(Argentina) Roberto Mieres (Italy) Cesare Perdisa	Maserati 300S	Maserati 3.0L S6	24	Gearbox (6hr)
DNF	S 3.0	14	(France) "Mike Sparken" (private entrant)	(France) "Mike Sparken" (Michel Pobejersky) (United States) Masten Gregory	Ferrari 750 Monza	Ferrari 3.0L S4	23	Engine (piston) (3hr)
DNF	S 750	61	(Italy) Ufficine Nardi	(Italy) Dr. Mario Damonte (France) Roger Crovetto	Nardi ‘Damolnar’ Bisiluro	Giannini 735cc S4	5	Accident (1hr)
DNF	S 1.5	39	(United Kingdom) Kieft Cars Ltd.	(United Kingdom) Berwyn Baxter (United Kingdom) John Deeley	Kieft Sport	Turner 1493cc S4	4	Overheating (1hr)

== Did not start ==
Pos	Class	No	Team	Drivers	Chassis	Engine	Reason
DNS	S 5.0	2	(France) Ecurie Rosier	(France) Louis Rosier (France) Georges Grignard	Talbot-Lago T26 GS Spyder	Talbot 4.5L S6	Engine
DNS	S 3.0	17	(France) Automobiles Gordini	(France) Robert Manzon (France) Élie Bayol (France) Jean Behra	Gordini T24S	Gordini 3.0L S8	Accident in practice
DNS	S 1.1	45	(United Kingdom) Arnott Racing Cars	(United Kingdom) Jim Russell (United Kingdom) Peter Taylor	Arnott Sports	Coventry Climax 1098cc S4	Accident in practice
DNS	S 750	54	(Italy) Moretti Automobili	(Venezuela) Lino Fayen (France) Herman Rogenry	Moretti 750S	Moretti 750cc S4	Took grid too late
DNS	S 750	55	(Italy) Moretti Automobili	(Italy) Giorgio Ubezzi (France) Mesnest Bellanger	Moretti 750S	Moretti 750cc S4	Took grid too late
Reserve	S 750	70	(France) Société Pierre Ferry	(France) Jacques Blaché (France) Louis Pons	Ferry Sports F750	Renault 747cc S4	
Reserve	S 750	72	(France) Automobiles VP	(France) Jean-Marie Dumazer (France) André Héchard (France) Jérôme Pourond	VP 155R	Renault 747cc S4	
Reserve	S 750	75	(France) Ecurie Rosier	(France) Jean-Louis Rosier (France) Jean Estager	Renault 4CV/1068 Spyder	Renault 747cc S4	

== Index of performance ==
Pos	Class	No	Team	Drivers	Chassis	Score
1	S 1.5	37	(West Germany) Porsche KG	(West Germany) Helmut Polensky (West Germany) Richard von Frankenberg	Porsche 550 RS Spyder	1.241
2	S 5.0	6	(United Kingdom) Jaguar Cars Ltd.	(United Kingdom) Mike Hawthorn (United Kingdom) Ivor Bueb	Jaguar D-Type	1.232
3	S 3.0	23	(United Kingdom) Aston Martin Lagonda Ltd	(United Kingdom) Peter Collins (Belgium) Paul Frère	Aston Martin DB3S	1.228
4	S 1.5	66; Reserve	(Belgium) Ecurie Belge / (France) Gustave Olivier	(West Germany) Wolfgang Seidel (Belgium) Olivier Gendebien	Porsche 550 RS Spyder	1.204
5	S 1.5	62	(West Germany) Porsche KG	(Germany) Helmut Glöckler (Guatemala) / (Czech Republic) Jaroslav Juhan	Porsche 550 RS Spyder	1.193
6	S 5.0	10	(Belgium) Ecurie Francorchamps	(Belgium) Jacques Swaters (Belgium) Johnny Claes	Jaguar D-Type	1.186
7	S 750	63	(France) Ecurie Jeudy-Bonnet	(France) Louis Cornet (France) Robert Mougin	DB HBR-MC	1.179
8	S 2.0	34	(United Kingdom) Bristol Aeroplane Co.	(United Kingdom) Peter Wilson (United Kingdom) Jim Mayers	Bristol 450C	1.139
9	S 2.0	33	(United Kingdom) Bristol Aeroplane Co.	(United Kingdom) Mike Keen (United Kingdom) Tommy Line	Bristol 450C	1.131
10	S 1.1	49	(Germany) Porsche KG	(France) Auguste Veuillet (United States) Zora Arkus-Duntov	Porsche 550 RS Spyder	1.128

- Only the top ten positions are included in this set of standings. A score of 1.00 means meeting the minimum distance for the car, and a higher score is exceeding the nominal target distance.

== 21st Rudge-Whitworth Biennial Cup (1954/1955) ==
Pos	Class	No	Team	Drivers	Chassis	Score
1	S 1.5	37	(West Germany) Porsche KG	(West Germany) Helmut Polensky (West Germany) Richard von Frankenberg	Porsche 550 RS Spyder	1.241
2	S 1.5	62	(West Germany) Porsche KG	(Germany) Helmut Glöckler (Guatemala) / (Czech Republic) Jaroslav Juhan	Porsche 550 RS Spyder	1.193
3	S 2.0	33	(United Kingdom) Bristol Aeroplane Co.	(United Kingdom) Mike Keen (United Kingdom) Tommy Line	Bristol 450C	1.131

== Statistics ==
Taken from Quentin Spurring's book, officially licensed by the ACO

- Fastest lap in practice – Castellotti, #4 Ferrari 735 LM – 4m 14.0s; 191.14 kp/h (118.77 mph)
- Fastest lap – Hawthorn, #6 Jaguar D-Type – 4m 06.6s; 196.96 kp/h (122.39 mph)
- Fastest car in speedtrap – Fangio, #19 Mercedes-Benz 300 SLR – 292.21 kp/h (181.57 mph)
- Distance – 4135.38 km (2569.73 miles)
- Winner's average speed – 172.31 km/h (107.07 mph)
- Attendance – about 400,000

== World Championship standings after the race ==
Pos	Championship	Points
1	(Italy) Ferrari	18
2	(United Kingdom) Jaguar	16
3	(Italy) Maserati	11
4	(West Germany) Mercedes-Benz	8
5=	(United Kingdom) Aston Martin	6
5=	(West Germany) Porsche	6
6	(France) Gordini	2
7	(United Kingdom) Austin-Healey	1

Championship points were awarded for the first six places in each race in the order of 8-6-4-3-2-1. Manufacturers were only awarded points for their highest finishing car, with no points awarded for positions filled by additional cars.

== Citations ==
World Sportscar Championship
Previous race: Mille Miglia	1955 season	Next race: RAC Tourist Trophy
