= 1955 Mille Miglia =

Motor race held on public roads around Italy in 1955

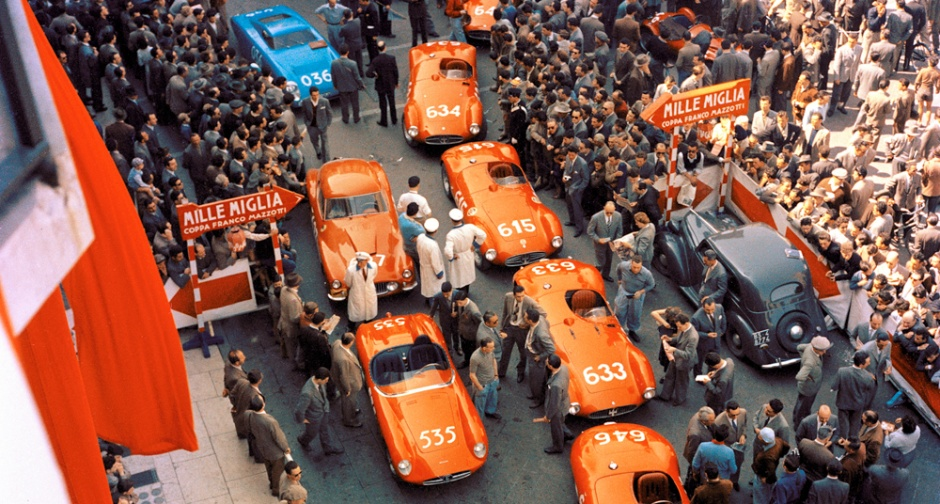
Mille Miglia start on 30 April 1955

The 1955 Mille Miglia was a 1,000 mile motor race held on a course made up entirely of public roads around Italy, mostly on the outer parts of the country on April 30-May 1, 1955. Also known as the 22. edizione Mille Miglia, the 992.332 mile (1597 km) route was based on a round trip between Brescia and Rome, with start/finish in Brescia. It was the 3rd round of the 1955 World Sportscar Championship and for the Coppa Franco Mazzotti.

As in previous years, the event was race against the clock, as the cars were released at one-minute intervals. In the Mille Miglia, the smaller displacement slower cars started first late in the previous evening, and the large-bore professional cars started last early the next morning. Each car number related to their allocated start time. For example, Luigi Musso’s car had the number 651, he left Brescia at 6:51am. Some drivers went with navigators, others didn't; a number of local Italian drivers had knowledge of the routes being used and felt confident enough that they wouldn't need one.

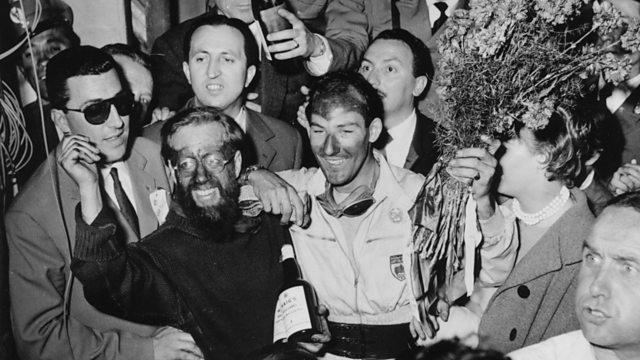
Winners Denis Jenkinson in a dark sweater, and Stirling Moss.

This race was won by Mercedes-Benz factory driver Stirling Moss with the aid of his navigator Denis Jenkinson. They completed the 992-mile distance in 10 hours, 7 minutes and 48 seconds- an average speed of 99 mph (158 km/h). The two Englishmen finished 32 minutes in front of their second-placed teammate, Argentine Juan Manuel Fangio. Unusual for this race, the weather was good for extended periods all around northern Italy, and Moss and Jenkinson never encountered any rain or other adverse conditions, which helped them to achieve the all-time record average speed for this race.

Typical of the very high danger of this race and the large amateur field it attracted for a race where professional teams would participate, 3 people- 2 drivers and 1 spectator were killed in this race. Giovanni Brinci, driving a Ferrari 212 with Dorando Malinconi hit a gate at rail crossing, overturned and crashed against a cement road sign in the village of Tortoreto Lido, just north of the 20th checkpoint at Giuilanova in Teramo about 300 miles into the race. Although Malinconi survived, Brinci was gravely injured in this accident, and would pass away in a hospital in the nearby city of Teramo the following day. An Alfa Romeo 6C 2500, #657 driven by Giannino Festari went out of control on the approach to a 90-degree turn along the Via Goito, towards the Scaricatore bridge over the Bassanello river, in the neighbourhoods of Padua, Italy, some 50 miles into his race. The accident occurred at about 08h00 on Sunday. According to eyewitnesses reports, Festari was one of three competitors who arrived together at the same time, and the Alfa went off the road and hit a group of spectators standing behind the straw bales, in a prohibited area. Fifteen people were severely injured, eleven of them were children. One of them, 4-year old Giuliano Carraro died in a hospital in Padua. And 50-year old Giuseppe Donnini, driving a Fiat 600 crashed into a parked car in Montichari near Brescia less than 20 miles from the finish, after nearly 24 consecutive hours of driving. He suffered grave head injuries and died a few hours later in a hospital in Montichari; his co-driver Fausto Castellarin had minor injuries and survived.

== Report ==
=== Route ===
The 1955 Mille Miglia was run on a clockwise 1,597 kilometres (992 mi) "lap" of Northern Italy

- Brescia Viale Venezia – Verona – Vicenza – Padua – Ravenna – Forlì – Cesena– Ancona – Pescara checkpoint, refuel (about 652 kilometres (405 mi))
- about 62.5 mile (100 km) route through the mountains to L’Aquila, checkpoint (about 109 kilometres (68 mi))
- about 130 km via Rieti to Rome Ponte Milvio, checkpoint (about 139 kilometres (86 mi))
- mountainous and twisty 140 mile (227 km) – Viterbo – Radicofani – Siena time control (about 232 kilometres (144 mi)) At this point, 690 mi (1,101 km) of distance had been covered in 6 hours, 51 minutes and 16 seconds by Moss and Jenkinson.
- 44 mi (70 km) Florence (about 71 kilometres (44 mi))
- 65 miles (107 km) away, over the fearsome Futa Pass in Tuscany – Raticosa pass – Bologna (about 112 kilometres (70 mi))
- Modena – Reggio nell’Emilia – Parma – Piacenza – Cremona 115 mile (185 km) stage.(about 189 kilometres (117 mi))
- Mantua – Guidizzolo – Montichiari – Brescia (about 136 kilometres (85 mi))

=== Entry ===
A total of 661 cars were entered for the event, across 12 classes based on engine sizes, ranging from up to 750cc to over 2.0-litre, for Grand Touring Cars, Touring Cars and Sport Cars. Of these, 534 cars started the event.

For this year's Mille Miglia, Ferrari, Mercedes-Benz, Maserati and Aston Martin all came to Brescia wanting to win. Scuderia Ferrari brought cars for Umberto Maglioli, Sergio Sighinolfi, Paolo Marzotto and Piero Taruffi, Aston Martin had a DB3S for Peter Collins and DB2/4s for Paul Frère and Tommy Wisdom; and Maserati only had one 300S for Cesare Perdisa.

Daimler Benz AG, who were making their Championship debut in this event, had probably the strongest line-up: Juan Manuel Fangio, Stirling Moss, Hans Herrmann and Karl Kling in their Mercedes-Benz 300 SLRs. Scuderia Lancia decided to put all their efforts into Grand Prix and did not attend the race.

The 1955 race was the only time when the event included a separate class for diesel cars. Ten were entered, these being four Fiat 1400A and six Mercedes-Benz 180 D examples.

== Race ==
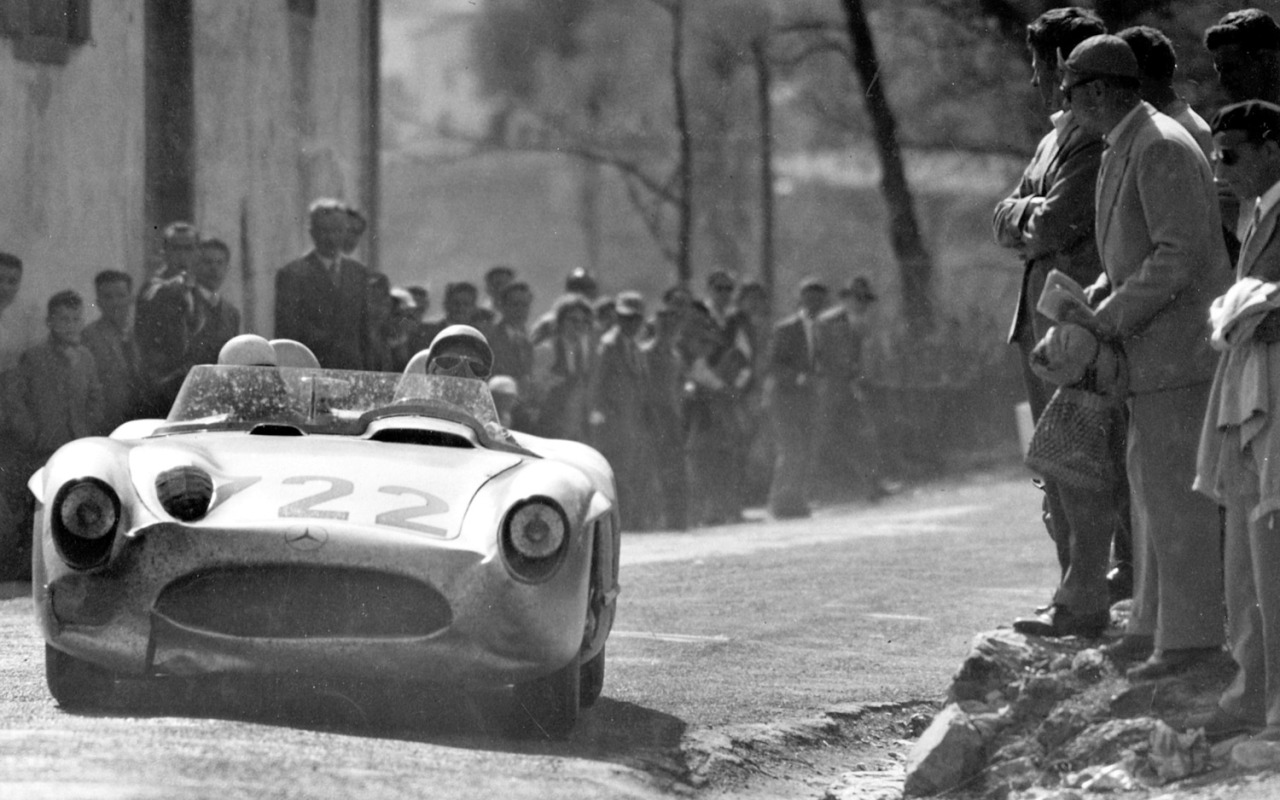
Stirling Moss and navigator Denis Jenkinson on the road

Mercedes did not enter the first two overseas WC races, and used the time for an astonishingly thorough preparation for the 1955 Mille Miglia. Tens of thousands of miles were covered as the entire route was travelled on every training run and extreme punishment was dished out to a mixture of Mercedes 220 Saloons, Gullwings and the first two 300 SLR chassis. Favourites to win were Moss and his navigator Denis Jenkinson, a motor racing journalist and World Champion side car passenger of the 1949 Grand Prix motorcycle racing season. Despite this being Moss’s fifth attempt at the Mille Miglia, Moss was relying entirely on Jenkinson's pace notes, a system used when Mercedes drivers Karl Kling/Hans Klenk won the 1952 Carrera Panamericana, now used ubiquitously in modern rallying. They had spent months before the race compiling while driving a 300SL on the route. Jenkinson's notes were written on a home-made roller scroll and signalled by hand. The others three works drivers did not use navigators, Fangio not since his had been killed in a crash. Kling also entered alone, while Hans Herrmann had a Mercedes mechanic on board, Herrmann Eger.

Initially the race wasn't in favor of the Mercedes duo, as Eugenio Castellotti streaked away from the field in his privately entered Ferrari 735 LM with its powerful 4.4-litre engine. By the time the fastest cars reached the town of Ravenna on the Adriatic Sea, Castellotti was two minutes ahead of Moss/Jenkinson, but Castellotti was driving very aggressively, sliding his Ferrari through the corners, his tyres leaving large black streaks on the road. As the cars streaked down the coastline towards Pescara, Castellotti had pushed too hard, and his Ferrari suffered a mechanical failure. His teammate Marzotto had a promising start but disaster struck when a tyre blew as he was traveling at 174 mph. He was able to keep the car on the road but as he stopped to grab the spare, he noticed that it was a different size from the others, so he was forced into retirement.

Moss surged into the lead as the fastest Ferrari expired, but there was still formidable opposition, this time from the Scuderia Ferrari driver, Piero Taruffi. Taruffi, who in No. 728 was the last driver to leave Brescia had averaged a stunning 130 mph on the sprint down to Pescara, shattering all previous Mille Miglia speed records with his 376 S. At this time, only a thin margin now separated the lead two cars as they refuelled, with Moss snatching the advantage thanks to a quicker stop. Fangio car at this stage began to develop engine problems.

The next checkpoint was in the town of L'Aquila. In order to get there, a 62.5 mile (100 km) route through the mountains had to be traversed. When Moss and Jenkinson reached this town, they were leading by 35 seconds, followed by Herrmann, Taruffi, Fangio and Kling - All the Mercedes cars entered were running 1st, 2nd, 4th, and 5th.

By this time, Jenkinson’s map-rolling device was paying off well. Moss’s supreme confidence in his co-driver allowed him to slam over blind brows in absolute confidence at around 170 mph; once the Mercedes actually flew for about 200 feet before crashing back on the tarmac. In that 28 second stop at Pescara, the 300SLR was quickly topped with 18 gallons of fuel, sufficient to reach its main stop in Rome.

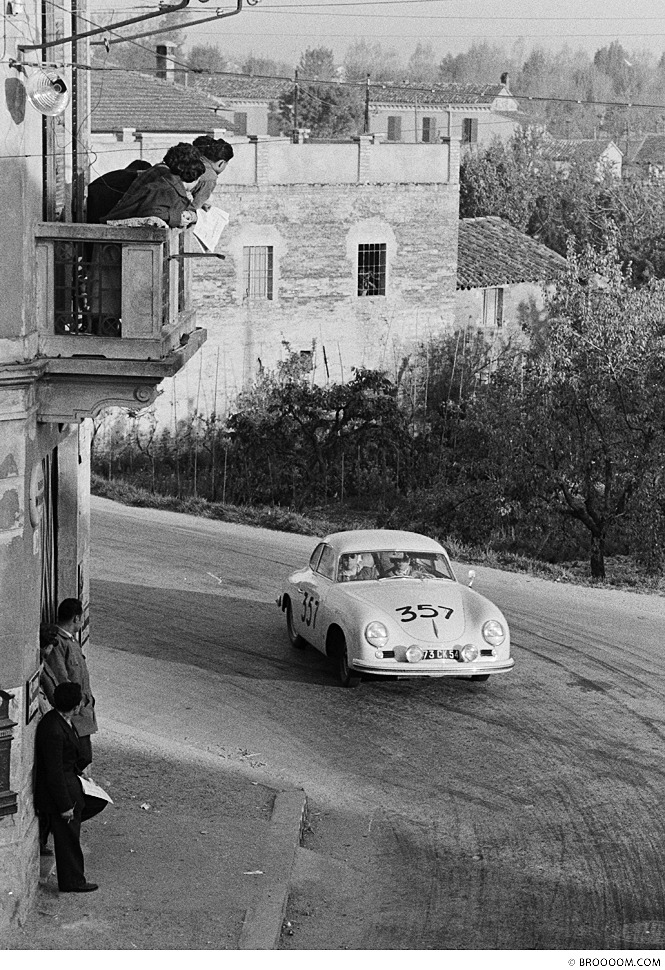
Hartmuth Oesterle and Jean Harmand in Porsche 356. They ended in 58th place

The next checkpoint was the Italian capital of Rome, which was the halfway point. Moss had taken 1 hour and 6 minutes to reach Rome from L’Aquila and he had extended his lead to 1 minute and 15 seconds over Taruffi. Kling crashed just outside the city when his Mercedes No. 701 ran wide in a right hand sweeper as he crashed avoiding some spectators. The car was in a ditch, up against a tree. Luckily, he only suffered broken ribs, but he could not race in the 1955 Monaco Grand Prix. Meanwhile, Fangio was still struggling with engine problems; his complaints were ignored by Mercedes pit personnel in Rome. Moss buckled down to tackle the most challenging and demanding section of the route. Constantly on his mind was a fierce desire to disprove one of the old sayings – ‘He who leads at Rome never finishes’.

The mountainous and twisty 140 mile (227 km) route from Rome to the next time control in Siena was a race of attrition. Perdisa and Taruffi both retired, and by the time he reached Siena, Moss had extended his lead to 5 minutes and 40 seconds over Herrmann - he had extended 1 minute and 36 seconds on Herrmann on this section alone. At this point, 690 mi (1,101 km) of distance had been covered in 6 hours, 51 minutes and 16 seconds by Moss and Jenkinson.

The next stage was from Siena to Florence, 44 mi (70 km) long, or relatively short. Moss had pulled out only 8 seconds over Herrmann, who was pushing hard. Fangio's engine began to make unhealthy noises, and when the mechanics checked the engine, one of the pipes of the very advanced fuel injection had broken; the engine in Fangio's car was now running on 7 cylinders. Moss in No. 722 passed the stationary No. 658 and thus was 25 minutes ahead of Fangio.

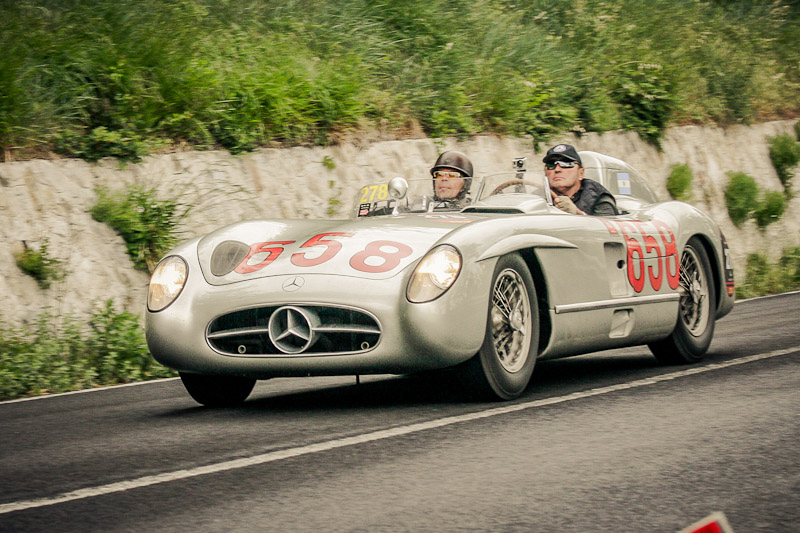
Fangio’s Mercedes-Benz 300 SLR on the 2012 Mille Miglia

After Florence was Bologna, 65 miles (107 km) away, over the fearsome Futa Pass in Tuscany - one of the most difficult parts of this race. Bologna was nearby Modena, which was home to the headquarters of both Ferrari and Maserati. After the pit stop, Herrmann's car had a loose gas filler cap, located right behind the driver's head inside the streamlined headrest. Under braking, fuel came onto the driver and into the cockpit; when it was impairing his vision, he crashed. Thus Herrmann/Eger No. 704 were out; Moss was at his best, out to shatter the one-hour bogey, and he was now 27 minutes and 38 seconds ahead of Fangio, and was fastest on this section, 4½ minutes ahead of Maglioli. When Moss and Jenkinson reached Bologna, they had crossed the Futa in 1 hour 1 minute- but had broken the record set by Giannino Marzotto in 1953.

By the time Moss and Jenkinson had reached the town of Cremona, they had extended their lead over Fangio to 30 minutes. They were once again fastest over this 115 mile (185 km) stage.

Now Moss and Jenkinson were on the final stage from Cremona to Brescia, however there was no letting up as Moss would bring the Mercedes up to 170 mph for a quick finale. At the finish, fêted by the Italian fans and surrounded by their team, the Englishmen discovered just how successful they had been. They had won the Mille Miglia, and had left all records shattered in the wake of their victorious 300 SLR. In second place came Fangio driving alone in the only other 300 SLR to finish, 32 minutes behind. Third was the Ferrari 376 S of Umberto Maglioli/Gino Monetferrario and fourth Francesco Giardini’s 2-litre Maserati A6GCS. Moss and Jenkinson reached Brescia at 17:29; 10 hours and 7 minutes after they left Brescia at 07:22. Moss became the first and only Briton and one of the few non-Italians to win the Mille Miglia. Moss also won the Index of Performance, normally won by the smaller capacity cars.

== Classification ==
=== Official results ===
Of the 521 starters, 281 were classified as finishers. Therefore, only a selection of notable racers has been listed below.

Class winners are in bold text.

| Pos. | No. | Class | Driver | Navigator | Entrant | Car - Engine | Time | Reason Out |
|---|---|---|---|---|---|---|---|---|
| 1st | **722** | **S+2.0** | **(United Kingdom) Stirling Moss** | **(United Kingdom) Denis Jenkinson** | **Daimler Benz AG** | **Mercedes-Benz 300 SLR** | **10hr 07:48** | |
| 2nd | 658 | S+2.0 | (Argentina) Juan Manuel Fangio | | Daimler Benz AG | Mercedes-Benz 300 SLR | 10hr 39:33 | |
| 3rd | 705 | S+2.0 | (Italy) Umberto Maglioli | (Italy) Luciano Monteferrario | Scuderia Ferrari | Ferrari 376 S Scaglietti | 10hr 52:47 | |
| 4th | **621** | **S2.0** | **(Italy) Francesco Giardini** | | | **Maserati A6GCS/53** | **11hr 15:32** | |
| 5th | **417** | **GT+1.3** | **(United States) John Fitch** | **(United States) Kurt Gesell** | | **Mercedes-Benz 300 SL** | **11hr 29:21** | |
| 6th | 724 | S+2.0 | (Italy) Sergio Sighinolfi | | Scuderia Ferrari | Ferrari 750 Monza | 11hr 33:27 | |
| 7th | 428 | GT+1.3 | (Belgium) Olivier Gendebien | (Belgium) Jacques Washer | | Mercedes-Benz 300 SL | 11hr 36:00 | |
| 8th | **541** | **S1.5** | **(West Germany) Wolfgang Seidel** | **(West Germany) Helmut Glöckler** | **Porsche KG** | **Porsche 550 Spyder** | **12hr 08:17** | |
| 9th | 646 | S2.0 | (Italy) Luigi Bellucci | | | Maserati A6 GCS | 12hr 09:10 | |
| 10th | 445 | GT1.1 | (Italy) Salvatore Casella | | | Mercedes-Benz 300 SL | 12hr 55:08 | |
| 11th | 700 | S+2.0 | (United Kingdom) George Abecassis | | | Austin-Healey 100S | 12hr 11:15 | |
| 12th | 631 | S2.0 | (Italy) Siro Sbraci | | | Maserati A6GCS | 12hr 24:31 | |
| 13th | 408 | GT+1.3 | (Italy) Carlo Castelbarco | (Italy) Angelo Savoretti | | Fiat 8V Zagato | 12hr 24:43 | |
| 14th | 542 | S1.5 | (France) Luc Descollanges | (France) Robert Nicol | | Osca MT4 1500 | 12hr 29:56 | |
| 15th | 717 | S+2.0 | (Italy) “Kammamuri” | | | Ferrari 250 Monza | 12hr 40:42 | |
| 16th | 441 | GT+1.3 | (Brazil) Hermano da Silva Ramos | (France) Jean-Charles Vidilles | | Aston Martin DB2/4 | 12hr 43:50 | |
| 17th | 650 | S2.0 | (Italy) Enrico Sterzi | (Italy) Vittoriano Vigano | | Maserati A6GCS | 12hr 49:04 | |
| 18th | 411 | GT+1.3 | (Italy) Carlo Croce | | | Lancia Aurelia | 12hr 52:29 | |
| 19th | 451 | GT+1.3 | (Italy) V. Vanini | (Italy) Ivo Badaracco | | Alfa Romeo 1900 SS Zagato | 12hr 56:11 | |
| 20th | 647 | S2.0 | (Italy) Luigi Olivari | | | Maserati A6GCS | 12hr 57:31 | |
| 21st | **244** | **GT1.3** | **(West Germany) Richard von Frankenberg** | **(West Germany) Peter Oberndorf** | | **Porsche 356 1300 Super** | **12hr 58:39** | |
| 22nd | 354 | GT+1.3 | (West Germany) Rainer Günzler | | | Porsche 356 1300 Super | 12hr 58:46 | |
| 23rd | 548 | S1.5 | (West Germany) Ernst Lautenschlager | (West Germany) Rudi Scholl | | Porsche 550 Spyder | 12hr 59:52 | |
| 24th | **518** | **S1.1** | **(France) Claude Bourillot** | | | **Osca MT4 1100** | **13hr 01:21** | |
| 25th | 238 | GT1.3 | (West Germany) Wolfgang von Trips | | | Porsche 356 1300 Super | 13hr 02:55 | |
| 26th | 416 | GT+1.3 | (Italy) Vladimiro Galluzzi | (Italy) “Ippocampo” | | Alfa Romeo 1900 SS Zagato | 13hr 13:08 | |
| 27th | 720 | S+2.0 | (Italy) Enzo Pinzero | | E. Pinzero | Ferrari 750 Monza | 13hr 14:01 | |
| 28th | **334** | **T+1.3** | **(Italy) Guido Cestelli-Guidi** | **(Italy) Giuseppe Musso** | | **Alfa Romeo 1900 TI** | **13hr 14:05** | |
| 29th | 638 | S2.0 | (Italy) Pietro Pagliarini | | | Maserati A6GCS | 13hr 14:07 | |
| 30th | 344 | T+1.3 | (Italy) Giancarlo Sala | (Italy) Manuel Vigliani | | Alfa Romeo 1900 TI | 13hr 14:57 | |
| 33rd | 533 | S1.1 | (Italy) Arnaldo Colantoni | (Italy) Raffaele Foglia | | Osca MT4 1100 | 13hr 18:27 | |
| 34th | 532 | S1.1 | (Italy) Luigi Nobile | (Italy) Luigi Bettiol | | Osca MT4 1100 | 13hr 18:38 | |
| 35th | **021** | **S750** | **(France) Claude Storez** | | | **D.B. HBR Panhard** | **13hr 19:03** | |
| 36th | 708 | S+2.0 | (United Kingdom) Lance Macklin | | | Austin-Healey 100S | 13hr 19:55 | |
| 37th | 501 | GT+1.3 | (Italy) Salvatore Leto di Priolo | (Italy) Massimo Leto di Priolo | | Fiat 8V Zagato | 13hr 21:36 | |
| 46th | 614 | S2.0 | (Italy) Franco Cortese | (Italy) Achille Stazzi | | Fiat 8V Zagato | 13hr 35:25 | |
| 55th | **118** | **T1.3** | **(Italy) Ersilio Mandrini** | **(Italy) Luigi Bertassi** | | **Fiat 1100/103 TV** | **13hr 48:12** | |
| 56th | 243 | GT1.3 | (Argentina) Oscar Cabalén | (Italy) Ottavio Guarducci | | Alfa Romeo Giulietta Sprint | 13hr 49:04 | |
| 57th | 554 | S1.5 | (Belgium) Gilberte Thirion | (Switzerland) Nadège Ferrier | Thirion/Bousquet | Gordini T15S | 13hr 52:18 | |
| 58th | 357 | GT+1.3 | (Germany) Hartmuth Oesterle | Jean Harmand | | Porsche 356 1500 Super | 13hr 53:04 | |
| 59th | 611 | S2.0 | (United Kingdom) Leslie Brooke | (United Kingdom) David Lampe | | Triumph TR2 | 13hr 54:52 | |
| 62nd | 026 | S750 | (Italy) Vincenzo Auricchio | | Vincenzo Auricchio | Stanguellini 750 Sport | 13hr 55:22 | |
| 65th | 041 | S750 | (France) Louis Navarro | | | Panhard Dyna | 13hr 58:01 | |
| 67th | 022 | S750 | (France) Élie Bayol | | | D.B. HBR Panhard | 13hr 58:45 | |
| 74th | **2254** | **TN1.1** | **(Italy) Olinto Morolli** | | | **Fiat 1100/103** | **14hr 14:43** | |
| 83rd | **203** | **GT1.1** | **(Italy) Ferrante Viola** | | | **Fiat 1100/103 TV** | **14hr 32:50** | |
| 93rd | **93** | **T750** | **(France) Juillet Galtier** | **(France) Maurice Michy** | | **Renault 4CV Allemano** | **14hr 44:58** | |
| 100th | 325 | T+1.3 | (Italy) Giovanna Maria Cornaggia Medici | (Italy) Luigi Grassi | | Alfa Romeo 1900 TI | 14hr 50:42 | |
| 108th | 84 | T750 | (France) Jean Rédélé | (France) Louis Pons | | Alpine-Renault A106 MM | 15hr 01:43 | |
| 201st | **04** | **D** | **(West Germany) Helmut Retter** | **(West Germany) Wolfgang Larcher** | | **Mercedes-Benz 180D** | **16hr 52:25** | |
| 215th | 09 | D | (West Germany) Karl Reinhardt | (West Germany) Wulf Wsnewski | | Mercedes-Benz 180D | 17hr 12:14 | |
| 273rd | 2211 | T750 | (Italy) Osvaldo Pieri | (Italy) Luigi Villoresi | | Fiat 600 | 20hr 51:18 | |
| DNF | 045 | S750 | (France) Jean Lucas | | | D. B. HBR Panhard | | DNF |
| DNF | 346 | T+1.3 | (Sweden) Jo Bonnier | (Sweden) B. Boscen | | Alfa Romeo 1900 TI | | DNF |
| DNF | 418 | GT+1.3 | (Belgium) Paul Frére | (United Kingdom) Louis Klementas | Aston Martin Ltd | Aston Martin DB2/4 | | Clutch |
| DNF | 436 | GT+1.3 | (United Kingdom) Tommy Wisdom | (United Kingdom) Peter Bolton | | Aston Martin DB2/4 | | Clutch |
| DNF | 615 | S2.0 | (Italy) Giorgio Scarlatti | | | Maserati A6GCS | 5hr 55:06 | DNF |
| DNF | 620 | S2.0 | (Italy) Maria Teresa de Filippis | | | Maserati A6GCS | 6hr 04:29 | DNF |
| DNF | 628 | S2.0 | (Italy) Luigi Taramazzo | | | Ferrari 500 Mondial | 5hr 52:07 | DNF |
| DNF | 651 | S2.0 | (Italy) Luigi Musso | | | Maserait A6GCS | 5hr 36:41 | DNF |
| DNF | 701 | S+2.0 | (West Germany) Karl Kling | | Daimler Benz AG | Mercedes-Benz 300 SLR | 5hr 13:20 | Accident |
| DNF | 702 | S+2.0 | (United Kingdom) Peter Collins | | Aston Martin Ltd | Aston Martin DB3S | | Con rod |
| DNF | 704 | S+2.0 | (West Germany) Hans Herrmann | (West Germany) Hermann Eger | Daimler Benz AG | Mercedes-Benz 300 SLR | 5hr 07:06 | Accident |
| DNF | 706 | S+2.0 | (Italy) Luigi Piotti | (Italy) Luigi Zannini | | Ferrari 750 Monza | | DNF |
| DNF | 709 | S+2.0 | (United Kingdom) Ron Flockhart | | | Austin-Healey 100S | | Accident |
| DNF | 712 | S+2.0 | (United Kingdom) Donald Healey | (United Kingdom) Jim Cashmore | | Austin-Healey 100S | 8hr 43:27 | DNF |
| DNF | 714 | S+2.0 | (Italy) Piero Carini | | | Ferrari 750 Monza | | DNF |
| DNF | 718 | S+2.0 | (Italy) Piero Scotti | | | Ferrari 375 MM | | DNF |
| DNF | 718 | S+2.0 | (Italy) Eugenio Castellotti | | priv. | Ferrari 735 LM Scaglietti | | Tyres |
| DNF | 725 | S+2.0 | (Italy) Paolo Marzotto | | Scuderia Ferrari | Ferrari 376 S Scaglietti | | Tyres/accident |
| DNF | 727 | S+2.0 | (Italy) Cesare Perdisa | | Officine Alfieri Maserati | Maserati 300s Fantuzzi | 5hr 19:01 | DNF |
| DNF | 728 | S+2.0 | (Italy) Piero Taruffi | | Scuderia Ferrari | Ferrari 376 S Scaglietti | 5hr 04:54 | Oil |

=== Class winners ===
| Class | Winners | | |
|---|---|---|---|
| Sport oltre 2000 | 722 | Mercedes-Benz 300 SLR | Moss / Jenkinson |
| Sports 2000 | 621 | Maserati A6GCS/53 | Giardini |
| Sports 1500 | 541 | Porsche 550 Spyder | Seidel / Glöckler |
| Sports 1100 | 518 | Osca MT4 1100 | Bourillot |
| Sports 750 | 021 | D.B. HBR Panhard | Storez |
| Gran Turismo oltre 1300 | 417 | Mercedes-Benz 300 SL | Fitch / Gesell |
| Gran Turismo 1300 | 244 | Porsche 356 1300 Super | von Frankenberg / Oberndorf |
| Gran Turismo 1100 | 203 | Fiat 1100/103 TV | Viola |
| Turismo serie speciale +1300 | 334 | Alfa Romeo 1900 TI | Cestelli-Guidi / Musso |
| Turismo serie speciale 1300 | 118 | Fiat 1100/103 TV | Mandrini / Bertassi |
| Turismo di serie speciale 750 | 93 | Renault 4CV Allemano | Galtier / Michy |
| Gruppo Diesel | 04 | Mercedes-Benz 180D | Retter / Larcher |

== Standings after the race ==
| Pos | Championship | Points |
|---|---|---|
| 1 | (Italy) Ferrari | 18 |
| 2 | (Italy) Maserati | 11 |
| 3= | (United Kingdom) Jaguar | 8 |
| | (West Germany) Mercedes-Benz | 8 |
| 5 | (West Germany) Porsche | 3 |

- Note: Only the top five positions are included in this set of standings.
Championship points were awarded for the first six places in each race in the order of 8-6-4-3-2-1. Manufacturers were only awarded points for their highest finishing car with no points awarded for positions filled by additional cars. Only the best 4 results out of the 6 races could be retained by each manufacturer. Points earned but not counted towards the championship totals are listed within brackets in the above table.

World Sportscar Championship
| Previous race: 12 Hours of Sebring | 1955 season | Next race: 24 Hours of Le Mans |
