= Helmut Polensky =

German racing driver

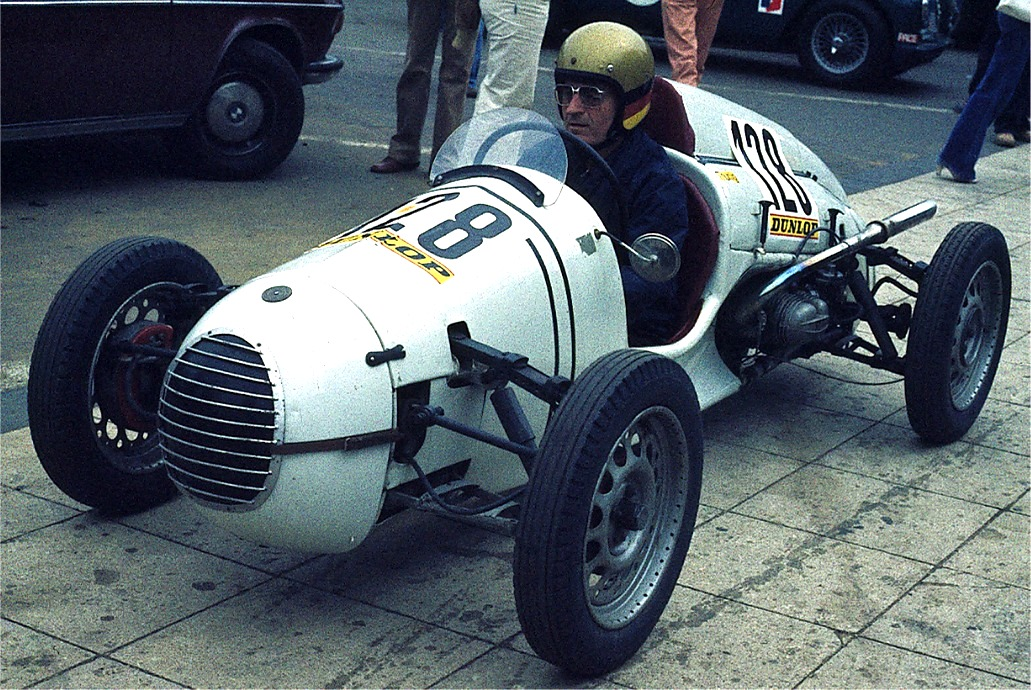
BMW-powered Formula 3 Monopoletta of Helmut Polensky, at a nostalgia Grand Prix event at the Nürburgring in 1978

Helmut Polensky (10 October 1915 in Berlin – 6 November 2011 in Saint-Tropez) was a German moto racer, racing driver and racing car constructor.

== Life outside racing ==
Polensky was the youngest of four sons. His father was an architect. After leaving school and finishing military service, he began a career as a professional motorcycle and auto racer. After the Second World War, he married. He spent the last decades of his life in Saint-Tropez.

== The 1930s and the Second World War ==
Polensky began racing motorcycles as a club racer in the mid-1930s. In 1939, he switched to sports car racing, piloting a used BMW 328. The same year, he signed as an engineer apprentice with Auto Union, and also joined the National Socialist Motor Corps.

Polensky spent the Second World War as a logistics specialist in Berlin. In 1945 he escaped from a Soviet prisoner of war camp, fleeing to Hamburg. He worked there in 1946 as managing director of a small motor company.

== Racer and designer ==
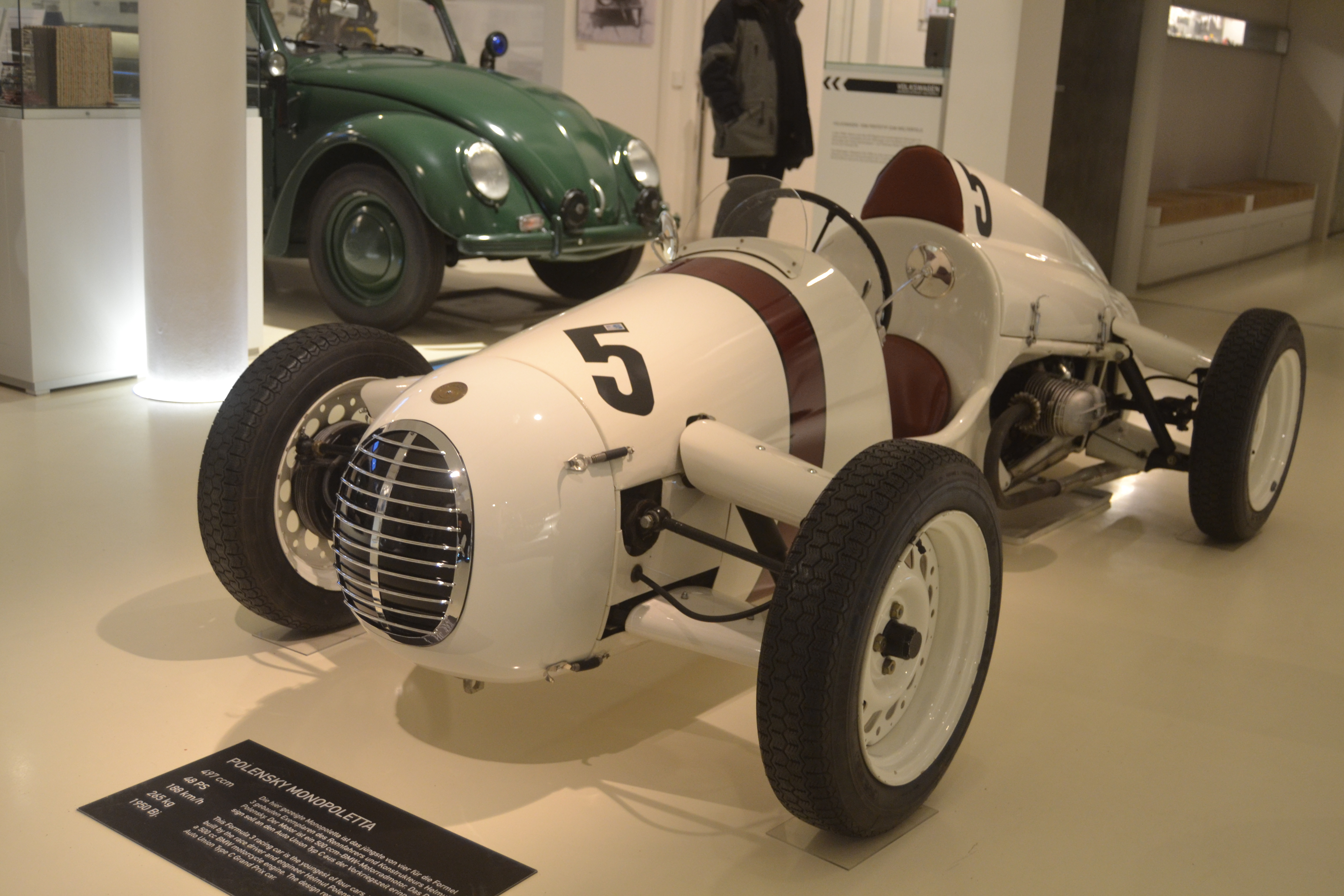
Polensky's Monopoletta in Prototype Museum (Hamburg)

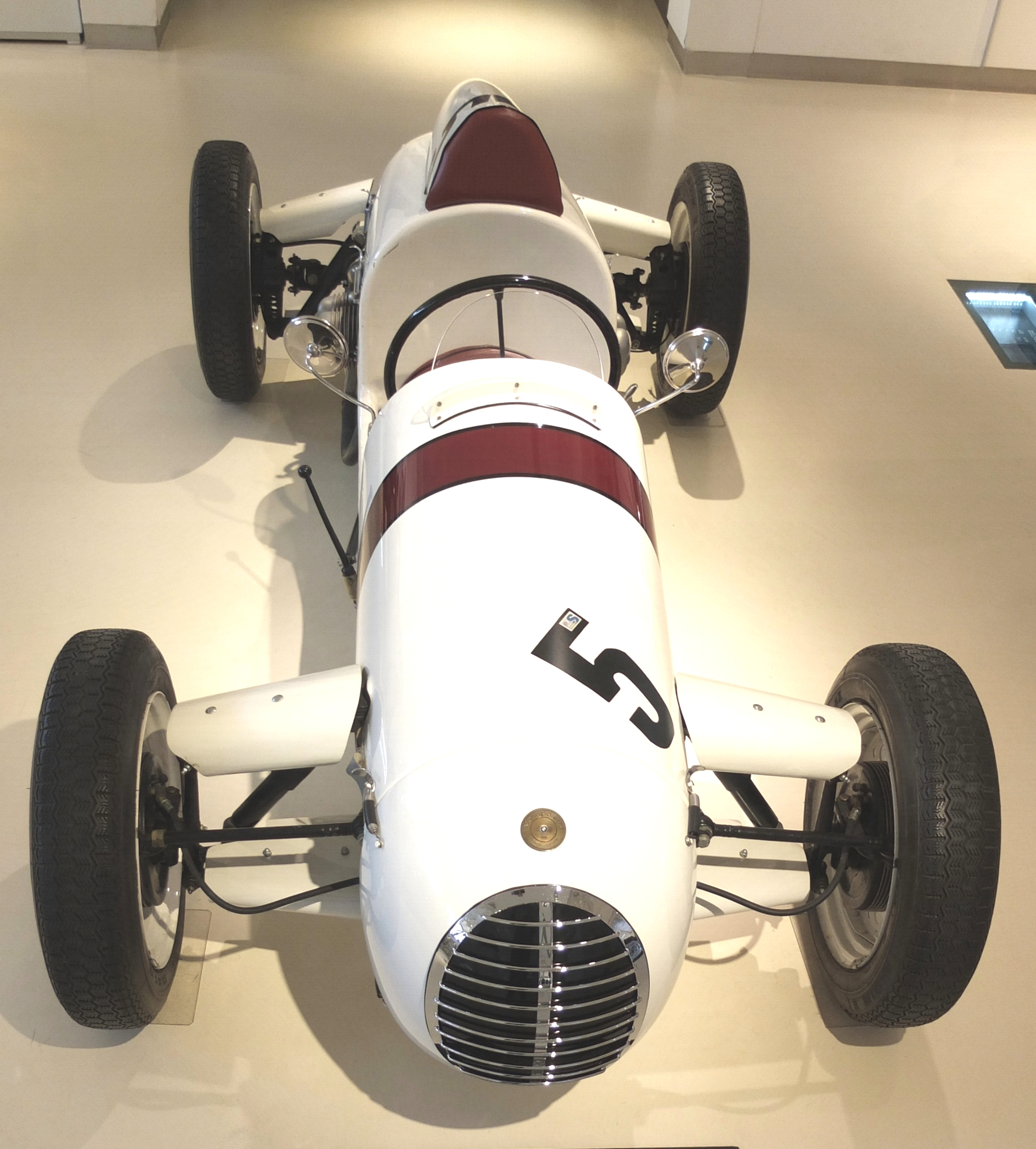
Front view

In 1947, Polensky returned to Berlin and in the ruins opened one of the first Vespa dealerships in Germany. He also began racing again, designing and in his own workshop constructing a Formula Three racer with a 500 cc (31 cu in) motorcycle engine, akin to the Cooper 500. Polensky's first model was the Kurpfalz. This was followed by the Monopoletta, a BMW-powered monoposto. Polensky raced his Monopoletta throughout the late 1940s across West Germany. In 1950, he was fifth overall in the West German Formula Three Championship.

In the early the 1950s, Polensky began to concentrate increasingly on sports car races. He entered the Mille Miglia in 1952. His wife served as co-driver several times in the Tour de France. Around the same time, he moved his family to Karlsruhe, where he opened a Volkswagen dealership. Driving a Porsche, he won the 1953 Coupe des Alpes and European Rally Championship, coming first overall in the championship. He was also eighth overall at the 12 Hours of Reims in 1954.

Polensky entered the 24 Hours of Le Mans three times. In 1955, he was shared a Porsche 550 with journalist Richard von Frankenberg, coming fourth overall and earning a class win. He also took the 21st Biennial Cup.

In 1956, Polensky quit racing to become a successful automobile dealer.

== Le Mans results ==
Year	Team	Vehicle	Teammate	Placement	Failure reason
1954	(Germany) Porsche	Porsche 550/4 RS Coupé 1500	(Germany) Hans Herrmann	Failure	Engine failure
1955	(Germany) Porsche KG	Porsche 550/4 RS Spyder 1500	(Germany) Richard von Frankenberg	Fourth overall, and class win	
1956	(France) Olivier Gonzague	Porsche 550/4 Spyder	(France) Claude Storez	Failure	Distributor

== Books ==
- Christian Moity, Jean-Marc Teissèdre, Alain Bienvenu. 24 Heures du Mans, 1923-1992. Éditions d'Art, Besancon, 1992 ISBN 2-909-413-06-3.
