= Bristol 450 =

Sports car racing prototype model

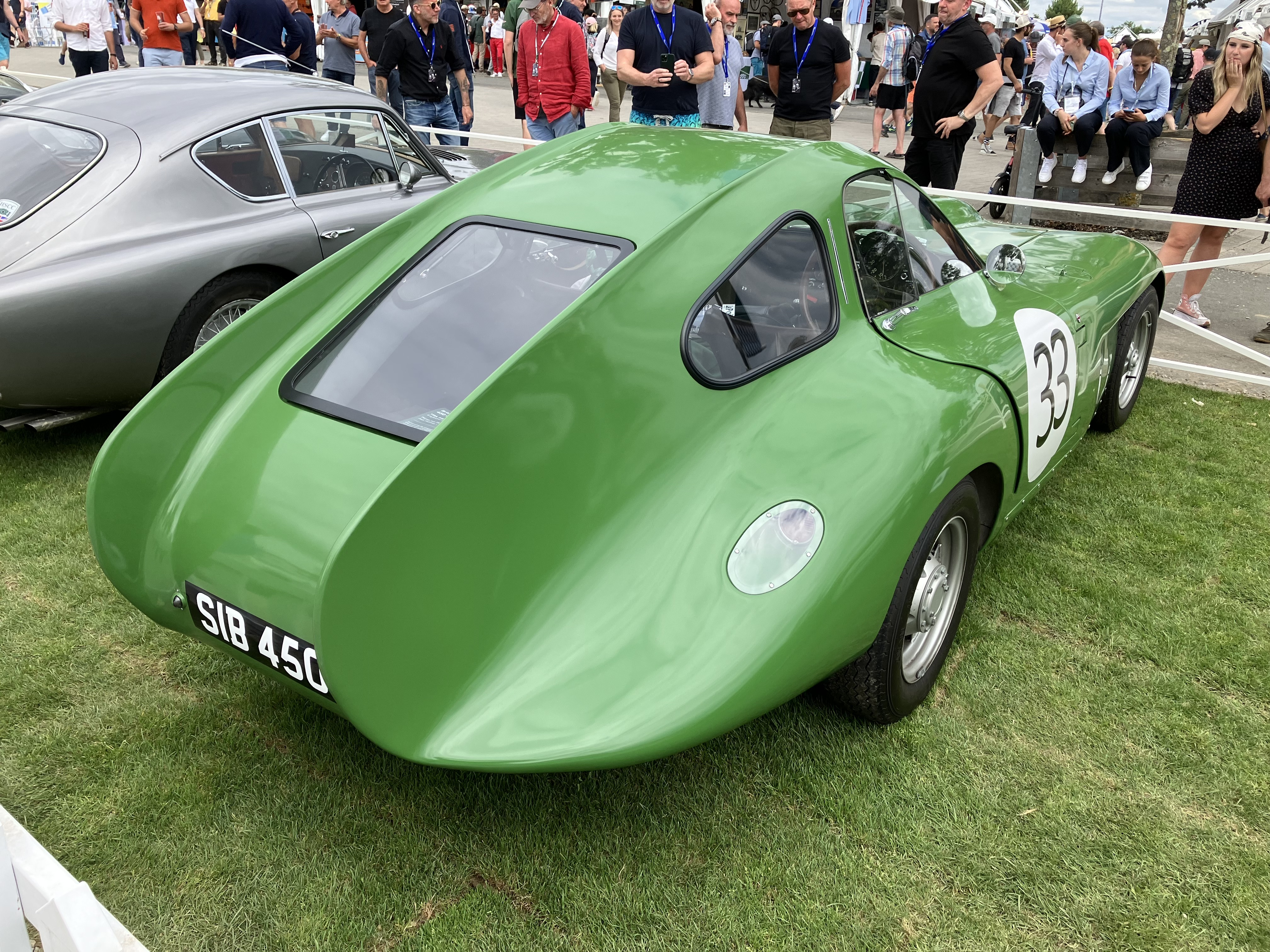
- Bristol 450 recreation by Andrew Mitchell, commissioned by Olivier Boré, photographed at the 2022 Le Mans Classic
- Category: 2 litre sports car
- Constructor: Bristol Aeroplane Company
- Designers: Robert Eberan von Eberhorst; David Hodkin; David Summers

Technical specifications
- Chassis: Tubular steel ladder frame
- Suspension (front): Double wishbone with coil springs
- Suspension (rear): De Dion tube, inboard brakes
- Engine: Bristol BSX 1,971 cc (120.3 cu in) Straight-6 FMR layout
- Transmission: Bristol 4-speed Manual

Competition history
- Notable entrants: Bristol Aeroplane Company
- Notable drivers: (United Kingdom) Jack Fairman (United Kingdom) Lance Macklin (United Kingdom) Graham Whitehead
- Debut: 1953 24 Hours of Le Mans
Races	Wins	Poles	F/Laps
5	3 (2 litre class)	0	4 (2 litre class)

The Bristol 450 was a successful sports car racing prototype model, designed in 1953 by Bristol Cars and based on the abortive ERA G-type Formula Two car of 1952. Although most sources state that only three 450s were built, photographic evidence suggests that at least four were in existence at one point in time. The cars were constructed specifically to contest the prestigious 24 Hours of Le Mans endurance race, at which they won both their class and the team prize in both 1954 and 1955. In addition to its race victories, the Bristol 450 also took a number of outright speed records for the 2-litre class during trials at the Montlhéry circuit in 1953. Following the 1955 Le Mans disaster, which killed Pierre Levegh and 83 spectators, Bristol withdrew from direct involvement in motorsport and all but one of the 450s were broken up.

== Design history ==
The fundamental design of the Bristol 450 was laid down by Robert Eberan von Eberhorst, and completed by his protégé and successor David Hodkin, as the chassis for the ERA G-type Formula 2 car, Leslie Johnson's attempt to resuscitate the ERA name in 1952. The G-type was initially planned to run using a custom built ERA engine, but when funding became a problem the design was adapted to incorporate the popular Bristol straight-6 engine, also used with some success by Cooper, Frazer Nash and AC. However, engine modifications made by Hodkin resulted in engine failure in all three of the G-type's Grand Prix outings, despite being driven by rising star Stirling Moss. At the end of the 1952 season, out of money and in failing health, Johnson sold the project to the car manufacturing arm of the Bristol Aeroplane Company.

=== Chassis and running gear ===
In late 1952 Bristol made the surprise announcement that the car was to be redesigned as a two-seat sports car, for entry into the following year's Le Mans race. Over the following few months the G-type was comprehensively redesigned and rebuilt by Bristol's new motor sport department, with the design team led by David Summers. The chassis itself was founded on twin, oval-section rails running the length of the car, which were changed to simple circular-section members for the Bristol. To these, the G-Type's double wishbone front and de Dion tube rear suspension were attached. The wheelbase was relatively long at 8 ft 1 1/4 in (247.0 cm), especially considering the car's narrow track of 4 ft 3 in (130 cm). Inboard brakes at the rear and an innovative hub/rim arrangement reduced unsprung weight. These innovative wheels consisted of a large hub spider – through which driveshafts could be switched without needing to remove the wheels and brakes – to which a wheel consisting of little more than a rim was attached. For the 1955 Le Mans race, to save further time during pit stops, Bristol developed an equally innovative multi-barreled, powered spanner, which could remove all five wheel nuts simultaneously. In much the same way as for modern Formula One wheel changes, the spanner would then retain the wheel nuts and allow precise reattachment of the new wheel to the car, applying the correct amount of torque to each nut.

The tall Bristol engine was mounted forward in the chassis, with drive passing along a propshaft directly under the cockpit to the four-speed gearbox mounted behind the driver. This arrangement, while requiring precise balancing of the engine-speed shaft, meant that weight distribution was as even as possible. Fuel was carried in two pannier cells behind the front wheels, in the position that Bristol road cars traditionally have battery and spare wheel compartments; their central position also resulted in minimal disturbance to the handling character of the 450, whether running on full tanks or empty. The sweet handling of the resulting car was commented on by driver Lance Macklin, when he stated that the Bristol 450 "could be driven without hands".

In early 1954, modifications were made to the engine that raised power output from the original ~140 bhp to 155 bhp (116 kW; 157 PS), raising top speed to over 140 mph (230 km/h) with Le Mans gearing. With a kerb weight of only 1,450 lb (660 kg), the power-to-weight ratio was over 235 bhp/tonne, comparable with many modern high-performance sportscars.

=== Bodywork ===
The Bristol 450, seen just after its record-breaking runs in late 1953. The revised front end styling, with deep headlamp fairings is clearly seen, as is the innovative hub/rim wheel construction.

The bodywork of the Bristol 450 was very advanced for the early 1950s. As a division of an aircraft manufacturer the Bristol design team had access to the company wind tunnel and the car was designed to be as aerodynamically efficient as possible. The cars first appeared with smooth basic shape, perhaps slightly over wide for the narrow track, but with the outline broken by lumpy, inelegant headlamp, spotlight and air intake bulges. The most striking features of the design were large twin stabilising fins running vertically down the rear of the small, enclosed cockpit, and down to the tip of the tail. The overall effect was far from pretty.

Following the team's first race outing both cars used returned to the factory in a damaged state. Alongside minor engine modifications, during repair dramatic changes were made to the styling of the machines. The panelwork was smoothed even further, with the small front wings now completely gone and the roofline raised between the rear fins; the headlamps were set into deeply recessed, faired-in conical tunnels; the spotlamps and indicator lights were set into more conventional faired recesses; and the engine air intake bulge was smoothed and tapered. At the same time the car's width was reduced, and cutout ducts were introduced behind the front wheels to improve cooling of the front brakes. All ancillary components were also removed from the airflow, either by fairing or by choosing alternative methods.

In 1955 a radical redesign of the cockpit was made, prior to that year's Le Mans outing. Further work in the Bristol wind tunnel had shown that, despite a slight increase in the C_{d}-value, the reduction in frontal area as a consequence of removing the cockpit roof resulted in an overall reduction in the car's aerodynamic drag. Instead of the previously all-enveloping, twin-finned roof, a wrap-around screen and single large tailfin were employed, in a manner very similar to the 1955 Le Mans-winning Jaguar D-Type cars. The compulsory second seat was still in place, but was covered by a solid tonneau.

== Competition history ==
The Bristol 450 made its race debut at the 1953 24 Hours of Le Mans race. Two cars were entered, with a third held back as a spare. Unfortunately for Bristol, both were out before half distance with near-identical failures. In each case the balance weights became detached from the crankshaft. This caused the rear wheels to lock at high speed, in turn causing the cars to veer off the road and catch fire. However, in the laps that the cars had managed to complete, Jack Fairman easily managed to post a new lap record for the 2 litre class. The cars were rebuilt at the factory, incorporating the revised aerodynamic bodywork, and only three weeks later, in early July, were entered into the 12h race at Reims. The Reims track shared the high speed character of its French cousin at La Sarthe and suited the Bristol's character well. Although one car again broke down, this time due to transmission failure on the first lap, the remaining car cruised to a class victory and finished fifth overall.

The cars returned to France in early October for a series of reliability speed record attempts at the Montlhéry circuit. All were successful, and on 6 October 1953 the Bristol team set six records for the 2-litre class, for endurance over a variety of distances and times: 200 miles (125.87 mph); 500 km (116.10 mph); 500 miles (112.25 mph); 1,000 km (115.49 mph); 3 hr (116.42 mph); and 5 hr (115.43 mph).

The cars did not race again until the 1954 Le Mans race. This time three cars were entered, with uprated engines and the improved aerodynamic bodywork. In contrast with the previous year, and despite torrential rain, all three cars finished the race, coming home in first, second and third in their class and seventh, eighth and ninth overall. Their performance also earned Bristol the team prize. The 450s remained in France for the Reims race, and again demonstrated unblemished reliability, taking 2nd, 3rd and 4th in class, beaten only narrowly by a Ferrari for the class victory.

Once again, Bristol was only interested in high-speed endurance racing and so the cars were put into storage until the 1955 24 Hours of Le Mans. With the revised, open bodywork the cars repeated their dominance of the previous year. Again they finished seventhth, eighth and ninth overall, first, second and third in class, and took the team prize. The lead car averaged over 100 mph (160 km/h) for more than the first 12 hours—only slowing on team orders—and spent only fifteen minutes in the pits during the entire 24 hour race.

However, despite this dominant victory record, the tragic accident during the race and a corporate shift away from emphasis on their products' sporting credentials persuaded Bristol to withdraw from racing immediately following their 1955 Le Mans triumph. Their prize monies were quietly donated to the relief fund for victims of the disaster, and they withdrew from the 1955 Reims race. Rather than allow poorly financed and inexperienced privateer teams to run their cars in inappropriate events, on their return to the factory the best car was selected, built up using the best components from all chassis, and the remainder scrapped. This car was retained by Bristol Cars owner and former racing driver Tony Crook for the next 30 years, on occasion loaning its engine to one of Crook's road-going saloons. In the late 1990s it was fully restored to 1955 specifications, and currently makes infrequent appearances at historic race meetings.
