= Helm Glöckler =

German racing driver (1909–1993)

Helmut Glöckler
- Born: 13 January 1909; Frankfurt am Main, Germany
- Died: 18 December 1993 (aged 84); Frankfurt am Main, Germany

Formula One World Championship career
- Nationality: (West Germany) West German
- Active years: 1953
- Team: non-works Cooper
- Entries: 1 (0 starts)
- Championships: 0
- Wins: 0
- Podiums: 0
- Career points: 0
- Pole positions: 0
- Fastest laps: 0
- First entry: 1953 German Grand Prix

Helmut Erik "Helm" Glöckler (13 January 1909 – 18 December 1993) was a German amateur racing driver.

== Biography ==
Glöckler raced a Deutsch-Bonnet in Formula 3 in 1951, and won the sports car racing event at the 1953 Eifelrennen with a new Porsche 550.

Glöckler also won the sports car class Alpine Cup trophy in the 1951 Österreichische Alpenfahrt rally driving a highly modified Renault 4CV.

Glöckler entered the 1953 German Grand Prix in an Equipe Anglaise Cooper, this being his one and only attempt at a World Championship race, but he blew his engine during qualifying and so did not compete in the race. Had he qualified for the race, he would be the first ever driver to use number 0 in a Formula One race, twenty years before Jody Scheckter became the first to race in number 0 at the 1973 Canadian Grand Prix.

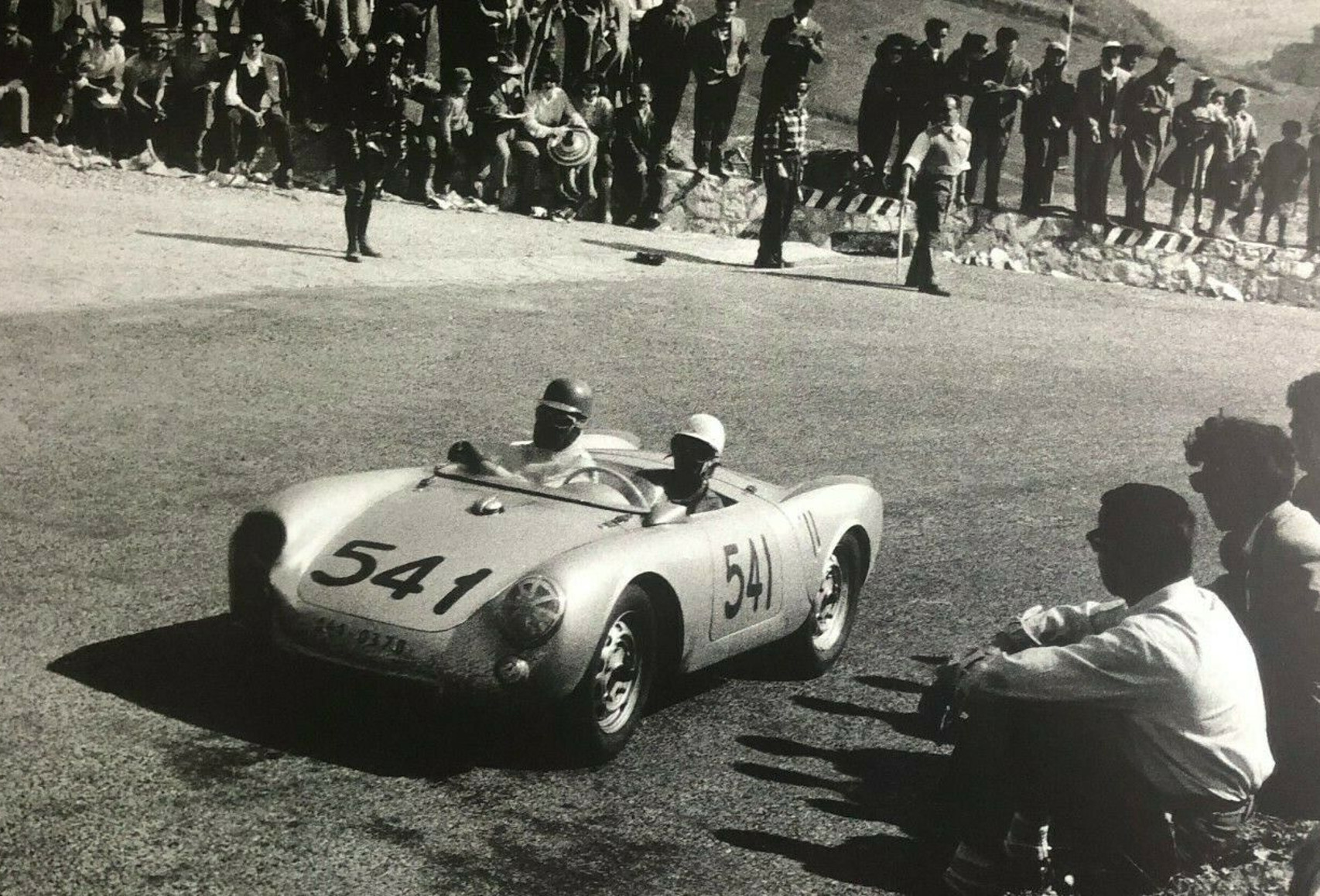
Glöckler with Wolfgang Seidel in Porsche 550-015 at the 1955 Mille Miglia, finishing in 8th place

Glöckler raced a Porsche 550 in the 1953 24 Hours of Le Mans with Hans Herrmann, and again in the 1954 24 Hours of Le Mans with Richard von Frankenberg.

Until recently, Helm Glöckler GmbH in Frankfurt bore his name, running a motorcycle dealer and workshop, and other enterprises.

== Family ==
Glöckler's cousin Walter created the small Porsche powered spyder in 1951 that later inspired the factory to produce the Porsche 550.

== Complete World Drivers' Championship results ==
(key)

Year	Entrant	Chassis	Engine	1	2	3	4	5	6	7	8	9	WDC	Points
1953	Equipe Anglaise	Cooper T23	Bristol Straight-6	ARG	500	NED	BEL	FRA	GBR	GER; DNS	SUI	ITA	NC	0

== 24 Hours of Le Mans results ==
Year	Team	Co-Drivers	Car	Class	Laps	Pos.	Class Pos.
1953	(West Germany) Porsche KG	(West Germany) Hans Herrmann	Porsche 550 Coupé	S 1.5	247	16th	2nd
1954	(West Germany) Porsche KG	(West Germany) Richard von Frankenberg	Porsche 550/4 RS Spyder	S 1.5	4	DNF	DNF
1955	(West Germany) Porsche KG	(Guatemala) / (Czech Republic) Jaroslav Juhan	Porsche 550 RS Spyder	S 1.5	273	6th	3rd
1956	(West Germany) Porsche KG	(West Germany) Max Nathan	Porsche 356 Carrera	S 1.5	26	DNF	DNF

== Sources ==
- World Championship results are derived from "The Official Formula 1 website". Archived from the original on 2015-02-19.
