= Arnott (automobile) =

Car produced by Arnott's Garages in the United Kingdom from 1951 to 1957

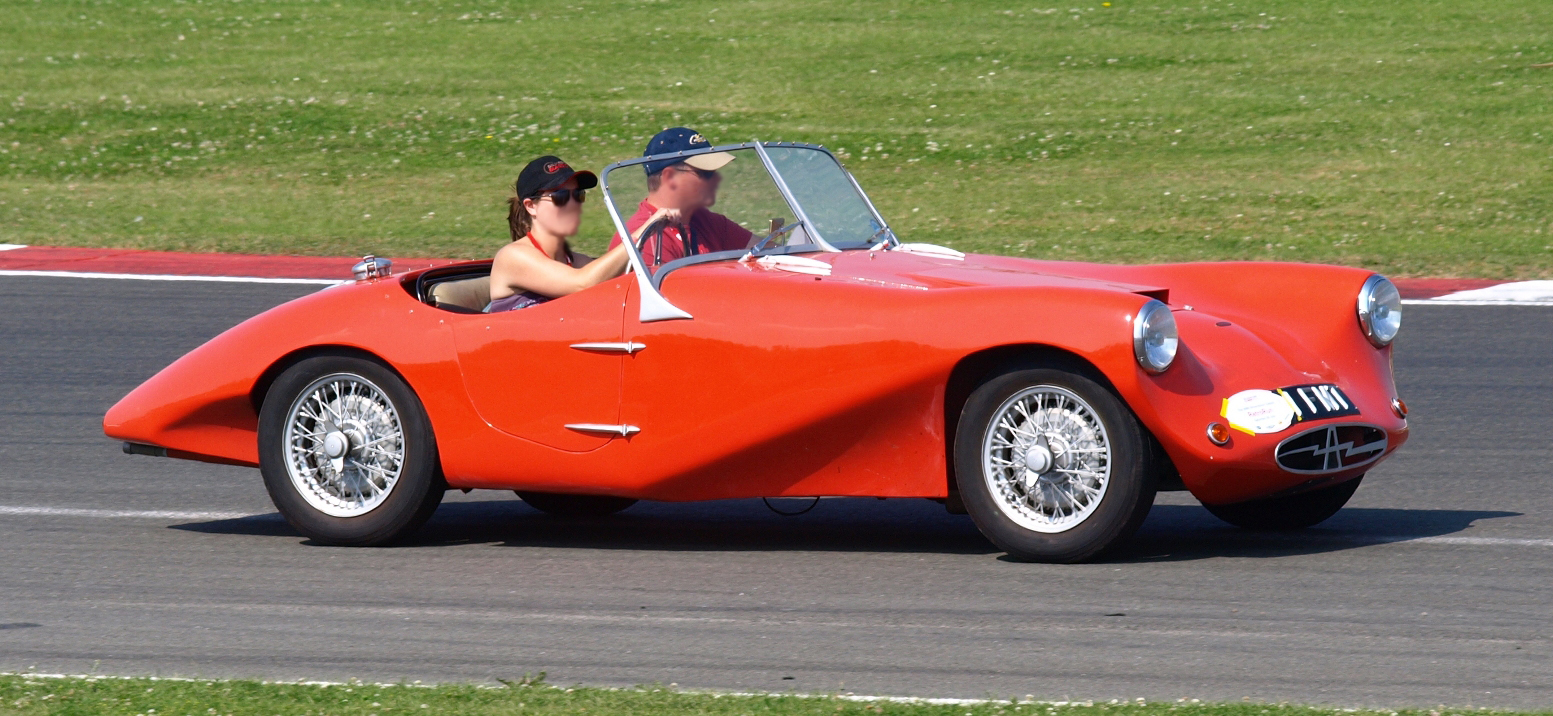
1955 Arnott-Climax Sports

The Arnott was a car made by Arnott's Garages in Harlesden, London, from 1951 to 1957.

Miss Daphne Arnott commenced production with a Formula 3 car designed by G. Thornton that used a tubular ladder frame with a torsion bar suspension. The model achieved success both in racing and in breaking Class 1 records at Montlhery in 1953. A supercharged Austin A30-engined sports car was sold from 1954, and a 1,098 cc Coventry-Climax model was introduced in time for the 1955 race at Le Mans. This model employed spring damper units operated by lengthy control arm wishbones from the wheels on the opposite side. This car crashed during practice.

Most of the roughly 25 units produced were fitted with fiberglass bodies.

== See also ==
- List of car manufacturers of the United Kingdom
