= Richard von Frankenberg =

German journalist and racing driver

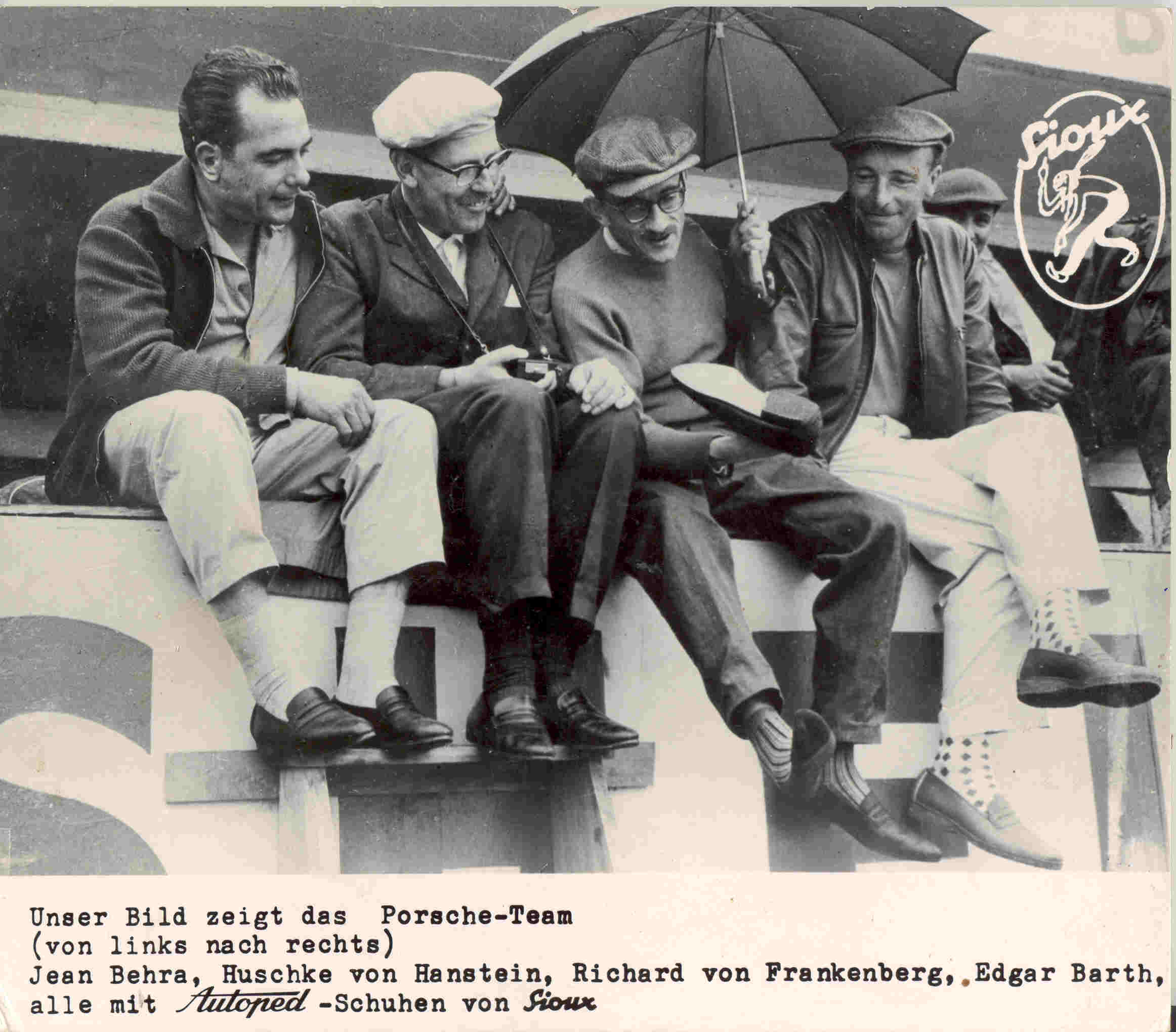
from left to right: Jean Behra, Fritz Huschke von Hanstein, Richard von Frankenberg and Edgar Barth

Richard von Frankenberg (4 March 1922 in Darmstadt – 11 November 1973 in Beilstein) was a German journalist and race car driver.

In 1952, Frankenburg created and published the (later) official Porsche magazine Christophorus (magazine). The visuals of the magazine were created by graphic artist Erich Strenger.For many years he remained editor-in-chief.

Frankenburg took part in many 24 Hours of Le Mans in the 1950s, as well as in sports car races at Mille Miglia, Montlhery, Monza and Nürburgring, often with a Porsche 550. He became famous in 1956 when he survived a spectacular crash during a sports car race at AVUS in Berlin. The Porsche slid over the top of the banked corner, and the driver was thrown out of the car, which was caught on photos like this one. He suffered minor injuries – unlike Jean Behra who was killed in a similar accident at the track in 1959.

Frankenberg was killed in a roadway accident in 1973 at age 51.
