= 1955 12 Hours of Sebring =

Sports car endurance race

Sebring International Raceway in 1952-1966

The 1955 Florida International Twelve Hour Grand Prix of Endurance took place on 13 March, on the Sebring International Raceway (Florida, United States). It was the second round of the F.I.A. World Sports Car Championship. For the fifth running of the event, the 5.2 mile course had been widened and smoothed with a new asphalt topping laid down. This was for safety and would allow the cars to achieve greater speed, especially in some of the corners.

== Report ==
=== Entry ===
A massive total of 124 racing cars were registered for this event, of which 101 arrived for practice, trying to get among the 80 qualifiers for the race. Despite the size of the entry, the event was not supported by the major European teams.

In January, the Mercedes-Benz team with Fangio, Stirling Moss and two Germans had taken part in two of the three racing events in Argentina, Fangio winning the GP F1 race and the 1955 Buenos Aires Grand Prix Formula Libre race using the new 3.0 engine of the upcoming Mercedes-Benz 300 SLR, but the new sports car was not ready yet, neither for the 1955 1000 km Buenos Aires nor for Sebring. Moss, who had piloted an Osca to victory in 1954, was allowed to race for another brand, with fellow Englishman Lance Macklin in a factory entry from England, for Donald Healey Motor Co..

Two cars came from France for Regie Renault Co., who include Robert Manzon amongst their squad. With no factory Ferrari entry to defend the championship lead earned by private 1-2 win in Argentine, they were supported by the private entries of Allen Guiberson and Luigi Chinetti.

Briggs Cunningham returned after winning in 1954, with five cars from five manufacturers. One of those cars was a factory-supported Jaguar D-Type for Phil Walters and Mike Hawthorn. Cunningham himself was entered in a new Offenhauser-powered Cunningham C-6R with John Gordon Bennett.

There were a dozen countries represented in the field, including the teams from Mexico and Venezuela. The later had Chester "Chet" Flynn leading their effort, while the Mexicans had a two car team with Fred T. Van Beuren and Carlos Braniff leading their charge. The race saw its first Hollywood movie star, as Jackie Cooper was listed to pilot an Austin-Healey 100S.

Miss Isabelle Haskell was to become the first woman to compete, not only in the 12 Hours of Sebring – but in any American Automobile Association sanctioned race. Although the AAA did not allow ladies drivers, Haskell discovered that there was no such restriction placed on 'foreign races'. By race day, another woman had signed up to drive in the race, Greta Oakes was listed to take the wheel with her husband, Sydney Oakes.

=== Race ===
The race was held over 12 hours on the 5.2 miles Sebring International Raceway. An estimated 20,000 spectators showed on a warm and sunny raceday. With the race starting promptly at 10am, 80 cars scrambled for positions. Meanwhile, six drivers who were unhappy at not being allowed to start, decided to go on the track at the start, they did one or two laps and then got off the track. Statistics show that the Hawthorn/Walter's Jaguar D-Type led all but one of the 182 completed laps, That single lap, a Ferrari 750 Monza of Piero Taruffi and Harry Schell were able take to the front for lap 32.

As darkness fell on the former Hendricks Army Airfield, the race ended in confusion. At one point, the Ferrari of Phil Hill and Carroll Shelby were declared winners, then it was the D-Type. The Jag was called to the winner's circle, only to run out of fuel during the victory lap. The former Le Mans winner, Luigi Chinetti, the Ferrari representative from New York protested the result, which was counter-protected by the Jaguar owner, Briggs Cunningham. Cunningham insisted that the D-Type had passed the Ferrari. The owner of the Ferrari, Allen Guiberson demanded that the D-Type should be disqualified, as it passed the Ferrari under a yellow flag. Cunningham countered the Index of Performance Trophy should not have been handed to Hill/Shelby, when in fact it should have gone to the Osca driven by Bill Lloyd and George Huntoon.

The AAA contest board called a meeting on 21 March to make a final decision. They inspected the records of Cunningham and Guiberson, and that of race timekeeper, Joe Lane. The AAA declared the Jaguar had won by a margin of ten seconds. Although Cunningham had won the race, his protest was disallowed and Ferrari was ruled the handicap winners under the Index of Performance. This was due to an admission by Ferrari team chief, Nello Ugolini had forgotten to count a lap. As a result, Walters became the first driver to win the Grand Prix of Endurance twice – having co-driven a Cunningham-Chrysler C4-R to victory with John Fitch in the 1953 race.

The winning D-Type covered 182 laps (946.4 miles), averaging a speed of 79.300 mph. The podium was complete by William Spear's Maserati 300S, which he co-drove with Sherwood Johnston albeit two laps adrift. Elsewhere, Cooper managed to finish the race in 41st, Haskell did not. She went out with an apparent engine problem. The Oakes' Austin-Healey also failed to finish, after being involved in an accident.

== Official Classification ==
Sebring in 1955

Class Winners are in Bold text.

Pos	No	Class	Driver		Entrant	Chassis	Laps	Reason Out
1st	**19**	**S5.0**	(United Kingdom) **Mike Hawthorn**	(United States) **Phil Walters**	**B. S. Cunningham**	**Jaguar D-Type**	**12hr 00:00.0, 182**	
2nd	**25**	**S3.0**	(United States) **Phil Hill**	(United States) **Carroll Shelby**	**Allen Guiberson**	**Ferrari 750 Monza Spyder**	**182**	
3rd	35	S3.0	(United States) William Spear	(United States) Sherwood Johnston	William C. Spear	Maserati 300S	180	
4th	36	S3.0	(Italy) Gino Valenzano	(Italy) Cesare Perdisa	Maserati Co. & B. S. Cunningham	Maserati 300S	178	
5th	28	S3.0	(Italy) Piero Taruffi	(United States) Harry Schell	Luigi Chinetti	Ferrari 750 Monza	177	
6th	44	S3.0	(United Kingdom) Stirling Moss	(United Kingdom) Lance Macklin	Donald Healey Motor Co.	Austin-Healey 100S	176	
7th	**64**	**S1.5**	(United States) **Bill Lloyd**	(United States) **George Huntoon**	**B. S. Cunningham**	**Osca MT4 1450**	**168**	
8th	68	S1.5	(West Germany) Huschke von Hanstein	(West Germany) Herbert Linge	Porsche Co. & B. S. Cunningham	Porsche 550 Spyder	166	
9th	63	S1.5	(Mexico) Carlos Braniff	(Mexico) Javier Velasquez	Carlos Braniff Cornejo	Osca MT4 1500	166	
10th	15	S5.0	(United States) Charles Wallace	(United States) Dick Thompson	Jack Pry	Jaguar XK140	163	
11th	61	S1.5	(United States) Bob Davis	(United States) Candy Poole	Robert H. Davis	Porsche 550 Spyder	163	
12th	14	S5.0	(United States) Russ Boss	(United States) Jake Kaplan	Jacob Kaplan	Jaguar C-Type	162	
13th	**5**	**S8.0**	(United States) **Ray Crawford**		**Ray Crawford**	**Kurtis Kraft-Lincoln 500K**	**161**	
14th	70	S1.5	(United States) Ed Crawford	(United States) John Urbas	Fed Crawford	Porsche 550 Spyder	161	
15th	45	S3.0	(United States) William Brewster	(United States) Bill Rutan	Wm. Brewster	Austin-Healey 100S	160	
16th	40	S3.0	(United States) Bill Cook	(United States) Steve Lansing	Hobart A. H. Cook	Austin-Healey 100S	156	
17th	12	S5.0	(United States) Roger Wing	(United States) Loyal Katskee	Loyal Katskee	Jaguar C-Type	156	
18th	**60**	**S2.0**	(United States) **John Panks**	(United States) **Ernie Erickson**	**S. H. Arnolt**	**Arnolt Bolide Bristol**	**154**	
19th	4	S8.0	(United States) Bull Murphy	(United States) Sam Hanks	B. Murphy	Kurtis Kraft-Buick 500K	153	
20th	17	S5.0	(United States) M. R. J. Wyllie	(United States) Leech Cracraft	Dr. M. R. J. Wyllie	Jaguar XK140	152	
21st	31	S3.0	(United States) Harry Woodnorth	(United States) Rees Makins	Rees T. Makins & Herman Rutson	Mercedes-Benz 300SL	152	
22nd	38	S3.0	(United States) Joe Giubardo	(United States) Fred Wolf	Joseph Giubardo	Austin-Healey 100M	152	
23rd	**81**	**S1.1**	(United States) **Paul O'Shea**	(United States) **Fritz Koster**	**Hoffmann Porsche Corp.**	**Porsche 550**	**152**	
24th	39	S3.0	(United States) William Wonder	(United States) William Wellenberg, Jr.	Wm. Wellenberg, Jr.	Austin-Healey 100M	151	
25th	59	S2.0	(United States) S. H. Arnolt	(United States) Bob Goldich	S. H. Arnolt	Arnolt Bolide Bristol	151	
DISQ	79	S1.1	(United States) Frank Miller	(United States) George Rabe	Frank Miller	Lotus-Climax Mark IX	150	pushed across the finish line
26th	18	S5.0	(United States) George Rice	(United States) Bob Grossman	Dr. Dolph Vilardi	Jaguar XK140	149	
27th	55	S2.0	(United States) Mike Rothschild	(United States) Harold Kunz	M. G. Rothschild	Morgan-Triumph Plus 4	149	
28th	48	S3.0	(United States) Jim Feld	(United States) Bob Ballenger	Brooks Stevens	Excalibur J Willys	148	
29th	58	S2.0	(France) René Dreyfus	(United States) Robert Grier	S. H. Arnolt	Arnolt Bolide Bristol	148	
30th	52	S2.0	(United States) John Weitz	(United States) Gordon MacKenzie	John Weitz	Morgan-Triumph Plus 4	145	
31st	84	S1.1	(United States) John Penn	(United States) William Wierdon	John S. Penn	Siata-Fiat 300BC	145	
32nd	43	S3.0	(Canada) James Fergusson	(Canada) Rowland Keith	Jas, F. Fergusson	Austin-Healey 100S	143	
33rd	57	S2.0	(United States) John Norwood	(United States) Don Vitale	John H. Horwood	Arnolt Bolide Bristol	141	
34th	69	S1.5	(United States) GuyAtkins	(United States) Trevor McKenna	Guy Atkins	Porsche 356 1300 Coupe	141	
35th	32	S3.0	(Venezuela) Chester Flynn	(Venezuela) Ed Munoz	Chester Fkynn	Mercedes-Benz 300SL	139	
36th	75	S1.5	(United States) Hubert Brundage (United States) Al DuPree	(United States) Howard Fowler	H. L. Brundage	Porsche 356 1300 Coupe	139	
37th	9	S5.0	(United States) Fred Scherer	(United States) Don Davis, Jr.	Fred G. Scherer	Ford Thunderbird	138	
DISQ	80	S1.1	(United States) John Bentley	(United States) Jim McGee	John Bentley	Abarth 207A Spyder	150	refuelling on track
38th	76	S1.5	(United States) David Ash	(United States) Duncan Black	David Ash	MG TF	137	
39th	77	S1.5	(United States) Jack Ryan	(United States) Buel Kinne	John E. Ryan	MG	135	
40th	8	S5.0	(Mexico) Fred van Beuren	(United States) Eugene Towie	Fred T. VanBeuren	Van Bueren-Chrysler Special	131	
41st	42	S3.0	(United States) Jackie Cooper	(United States) Roy Jackson-Moore	Jack Cooper	Austin-Healey 100S	131	
42nd	67	S1.5	(United States) Evans Hunt	(United States) Howard Hanna	Howard Hanna	Porsche 550 Spyder	130	
DNF	54	S2.0	(United States) Tom Friedmann	(United States) Karl Brocken	T.A. Fredmann	Maserati 300 AG	129	Gearbox
43rd	50	S2.0	(United Kingdom) Tony Palmer-Morewood (United States) Masten Gregory	(United States) Gleb Derujinsky	Ecurie Yankee	Ferrari 500 Mondial	124	
44th	**88**	**S750**	(United States) **E. C. Miller**	(United States) **Curtis Attaway**	**Int. Auto Sales Co.**	**Renault 1063**	**124**	
DNF	87	S750	(France) Louis Pons (France) Jean Hébert	(France) Robert Manzon	Regie Renault Co.	Renault 1063	121	Engine
DNF	72	S1.5	(United States) Norman Christianson	(United States) Don McKnought	Norman Christianson	Porsche 550 Spyder	119	Brakes
DNF	82	S1.1	(United States) Austin Conley	(United States) LeRoy Thorpe	Austin L. Conley	Siata-Fiat 300BC	112	unknown
DNF		S2.0	(United States) David Mott	(United States) Don Skogmo	John F. Ellwood	Triumph TR2	111	Head gasket
DNF		S1.1	(United States) Norman Scott	(United States) Robert W. Samuelson	Bobbie Burns & Norman J. Scott, Jr.	Lotus-Climax Mark IX	109	Accident
45th	3	S8.0	(United States) Walt Gray	(United States) Paul Ceresole	Walter Gray	Allard-Chrysler J2X	104	
DNF	24	S3.0	(United States) Ernie McAfee	(United States) Howard Wheeler	Wm. H. Doheny	Ferrari 750 Monza	99	unknown
DNF	100	S2.0	(United States) Jim Pauley	(United States) David Michaels	James E. Pauley	Siata 208 CS Balbo	96	Transmission
DNF	29	S3.0	(United States) Sterling Edwards	(United States) Chuck Daigh	Manfredo Lippmann	Ferrari 750 Monza	88	Engine
DNF	73	S1.5	(United States) Otto Linton	(United States) Hal Stetson	Speedcraft Enterprises	Osca MT4 1450	83	Unknown
46th	16	S5.0	(United States) Fred Dagavar	(United States) Al Garz	Fred Dagavar	Jaguar XK120	73	
DNF	83	S1.1	(United States) Dick Irish	(United States) Isabelle Haskell	Isabelle Haskell	Bandini Fiat	67	Engine
DNF	71	S1.5	(United States) Richard Toland	(United States) Stan Hoffstein	Richard H. R. Toland	Denzel-Volkswagen 1300 Super	61	Unknown
DNF	41	S3.0	(United States) William Milliken, Jr.	(United States) Lester Smalley	Bill Milliken	Austin-Healey 100	60	Engine
DNF	74	S1.5	(United States) Walt Hansgen	(United States) William Eager	George E. Tilp	Osca MT4 1350	58	Rear Axle
DNF	37	S3.0	(United States) Briggs Cunningham	(United States) John Gordon Bennett	B. S. Cunningham	Cunningham C-6R	54	Gearbox
DNF	26	S3.0	(Spain) Alfonso de Portago	(Italy) Umberto Maglioli	Marquis de Portago	Ferrari 750 Monza	53	Gearbox
DNF	47	S3.0	(United States) Hal Ullrich	(United States) Robert Grey	Brooks Stevens	Excalibur J Willys	50	Engine
DNF	46	S3.0	(United States) Gus Ehrman	(United States) Fred Allen	Fred F. Allen	Austin-Healey 100S	47	Oil leak
DNF	49	S3.0	(The Bahamas) Sydney Oakes	(The Bahamas) Greta Oakes	Sir Sydney Oakes	Austin-Healey 100M	44	Accident
DNF	89	S750	(United States) Sandy MacArthur	(United States) Paul Gougelman	Sandy MacArthur	Bandini-Mercury Outboard	34	Engine
DNF	66	S1.5	(United States) Phil Stewart	(United States) Ted Boynton	Philip B. Stewart	Osca MT4 1500	33	Accident damage
DNF	65	S1.5	(United States) Harry Chapman	(United States) William Ball	Harry A. Chapman	Osca MT4 1500	18	Unknown
DNF	7	S5.0	(United States) Jim Kimberly	(United States) Ed Lunken	James Kimberly	Ferrari 375 Plus	18	Rear axle
DNF	33	S3.0	(Venezuela) Julio Pola	(Venezuela) Pancho Croquer	Pancho P. Croquer	Mercedes-Benz 300SL	17	Out of fuel
DNF	53	S2.0	(Dominican Republic) Porfirio Rubirosa	(United States) Cal Niday	Porfirio Rubirosa	Ferrari 500 Mondial	14	Accident
DNF	2	S8.0	(United States) Andy Rosenberger	(United States) Charles Cowdin	A. Rosenberger	Nash-Healey Le Mans	14	Gearbox
DNF	85	S1.1	(United States) Bret Hannaway	(United States) Raymond Osborne	Dr. Raymond Osborne	Kieft-Fiat Sport	10	Engine
DNF	11	S5.0	(United States) Jack McAfee	(United States) Bob Drake	Tony Parravano	Ferrari 375 MM	5	Fuel fire
DNF	1	S8.0	(United States) Jack Ensley	(United States) Jim Rathmann	Jack Ensley	Kurits Kraft-Cadillac 500	3	Engine
DNF	27	S3.0	(United States) Bob Said	(United States) Masten Gregory	Ecurie Yankee	Ferrari 750 Monza	3	Collision with ambulance
DNF	86	S750	(France) Jean Rédélé	(France) Louis Pons	Regie Renault Co.	Renault 1063	2	Accident
DNF	86	S750	(United States) John Shakespeare	(Guatemala) Manfredo Lippmann	J. W. Shakespeare	Ferrari 375 MM	0	Electrics
DNS	6	S5.0	(United States) Walter F. Huggler	(United States) John B. Mull	John B. Mull	Jaguar XK120		Reserve
DNS	12A	S5.0	(Venezuela) Reina Morales	(Venezuela) Ed Munoz	Chester J. Flynn	Ferrari 340 America		Accident in practice
DNS	21P	S1.5	(United States) Art Bunker		Art Bunker	Porsche 500 Spyder		
DNS	29T	S3.0	(United States) Sterling Edwards	(Venezuela) Chester Flynn	Manfredo Lippmann	Ferrari 250 Monza		Engine
DNS	41	S3.0	(United States) Sandy McPherson (United States) Harley Watts	(United States) Robert Fergus	Robt. H. Fergus	Austin-Healey 100S		Accident in practice
DNS	62	S1.5	(United States) Ed Crawford	(United States) John Urbas	Ed. W. Crawford	Porsche 550 Spyder		
DISQ		S2.0	(United States) James Carson	(United States) Dan Hastings	Howard Hanna	Swallow Doretti-Triumph		started illegally – flagged off
DISQ		S1.1	(United States) Warren Smith	(United States) Joe Sheppard	Joe Sheppard	Lotus-Climax Mark IX		started illegally – flagged off
DISQ		S3.0	(United States) Billy Dantone	(United States) Phil M. Seeberg	Billy J. Dantone	Austin-Healey 100		started illegally – flagged off
DISQ		S3.0	(United States) Phil Stiles	(United States) Red Bryon	Phil Stiles	Austin-Healey 100		started illegally – flagged off
DISQ		S3.0	(United States) Emil Bulck	(United States) William Bulck	Emil Bulck	Austin-Healey 100		started illegally – flagged off
DISQ		S2.0	(United States) Fred Losee	(United States) William Kichloe	Fred L. Losee	Veritas Comet RS		started illegally – flagged off

- Fastest Lap: Sherwood Johnston, 3:38.8secs (85.558 mph)

=== Class Winners ===
Class	Winners		
Class B - Sports 8000	5	Kurtis Kraft-Lincoln 500K	Crawford
Class C - Sports 5000	19	Jaguar D-type	Hawthorn / Walters
Class D - Sports 3000	25	Ferrari 750 Monza Spyder	Hill / Shelby
Class E- Sports 2000	60	Arnolt Bolide Bristol	Panks / Erickson
Class F - Sports 1500	64	Osca MT4 1450	Lloyd / Huntoon
Class G - Sports 1100	81	Porsche 550 Spyder	O'Shea / Koster
Class H - Sports 750	88	Renault 1063	Miller / Attaway

== Standings after the race ==
Pos	Championship	Points
1	(Italy) Ferrari	14
2=	(United Kingdom) Jaguar	8
2=	(Italy) Maserati	8
4	(West Germany) Porsche	3
5	(France) Gordini	2

- Note: Only the top five positions are included in this set of standings.

Championship points were awarded for the first six places in each race in the order of 8-6-4-3-2-1. Manufacturers were only awarded points for their highest finishing car with no points awarded for positions filled by additional cars. Only the best 4 results out of the 6 races could be retained by each manufacturer. Points earned but not counted towards the championship totals are listed within brackets in the above table.

World Sportscar Championship
Previous race: 1000 km Buenos Aires	1955 season	Next race: Mille Miglia
