= Phil Walters =

American racing driver

- Nationality: (United States) American
- Born: April 20, 1916 New York City, US
- Died: February 6, 2000 (aged 83) Homosassa, Florida, US

Philip F. Walters (April 20, 1916 – February 6, 2000) was an American racing driver, who won both the 12 Hours of Sebring and Watkins Glen Grand Prix twice.

Walters was inducted into the Motorsports Hall of Fame of America in 2024.

== Early career ==
Walters was born in New York City and grew up in Manhasset, New York, and in his late teens began racing midgets at tracks on Long Island. He raced under a pseudonym - "Ted Tappett" – so that his family did not know he was racing. By all accounts, Walters’s style was brute-force, all-arms-and-elbows sort of oval racer.

== The War Years ==
It was January 1942 when he joined the United States Army Air Corps, as a transport and glider pilot. He flew a Waco CG-4A glider during a disastrous invasion of the Netherlands, which the Germans knew of in advance. He was able to safely land his troops although he was wounded, and taken prisoner. While in a German hospital, ironically, the German surgeon who saved his life by removing a kidney and half a lung had watched Walters win a midget race in Philadelphia five years before.he was able to save his life as a result of finding a like minded Luftwaffe pilot to donate his blood, against regulations, However, his strength and stamina were reduced. He finished the World War II with the Air Medal, a Purple Heart, seven Bronze Stars and the rank of Flight officer.

Following those injuries sustained during the war, he adopted a smoother, less forceful driving style and found this faster, and well-suited to sports car road racing.

== Racing career ==
=== Post-war career ===
After the war, Phil went back to racing in Kurtis-Offenhauser midgets. He resumed his winning ways, stringing together 26 feature race wins in row in 1947, and in another 47 events, he would never finish lower than third in the final results. He dominated at the Riverside Park Speedway, becoming their first track champion in 1949. Later he moved in stock cars and posted a record number of victories in USSCRC events, at places like Agawam, Deer Park, Hinchcliffe, and Cherry Park. In addition to his racing, he formed a business partnership with Bill Frick, called Frick-Tappett Motors, which did race car preparation and they built the well-known ‘Fordillac’ performance cars (Cadillac engines in Ford chassis). Eventually the partnership became a Volkswagen and Porsche dealership.

=== The Cunningham Years (1950–1955) ===
During 1949, Briggs Cunningham bought a Fordillac with an eye on racing it in 24 Hours of Le Mans and approached Walters with the idea of an all-American sports car for endurance racing. After a short while, Phil became the general manager of the B. S. Cunningham Company, who built the first post-war American cars to race at Le Mans. The organizers of Le Mans, Automobile Club de l'Ouest rejected the Fordillac, so Cunningham took two Cadillacs to the Circuit de la Sarthe in 1950. Walters paired with Cunningham and finished 11th in a special-bodied roadster, dubbed ‘Le Monstre’, despite Cunningham getting stuck off-course in some sand for half an hour.

Setting a shop in West Palm Beach, Florida, served as a base to the Frick-Tappett division of the B. S. Cunningham Co., the team set its sights on the 1951 Le Mans. Walters, by now Managing Director of Cunningham formed a new driver partnership with fellow American, John Fitch, ran as high as second before finishing 18th. He returned in 1952, this time alongside Duane Carter, only to record a DNF because of a blown Chrysler engine.

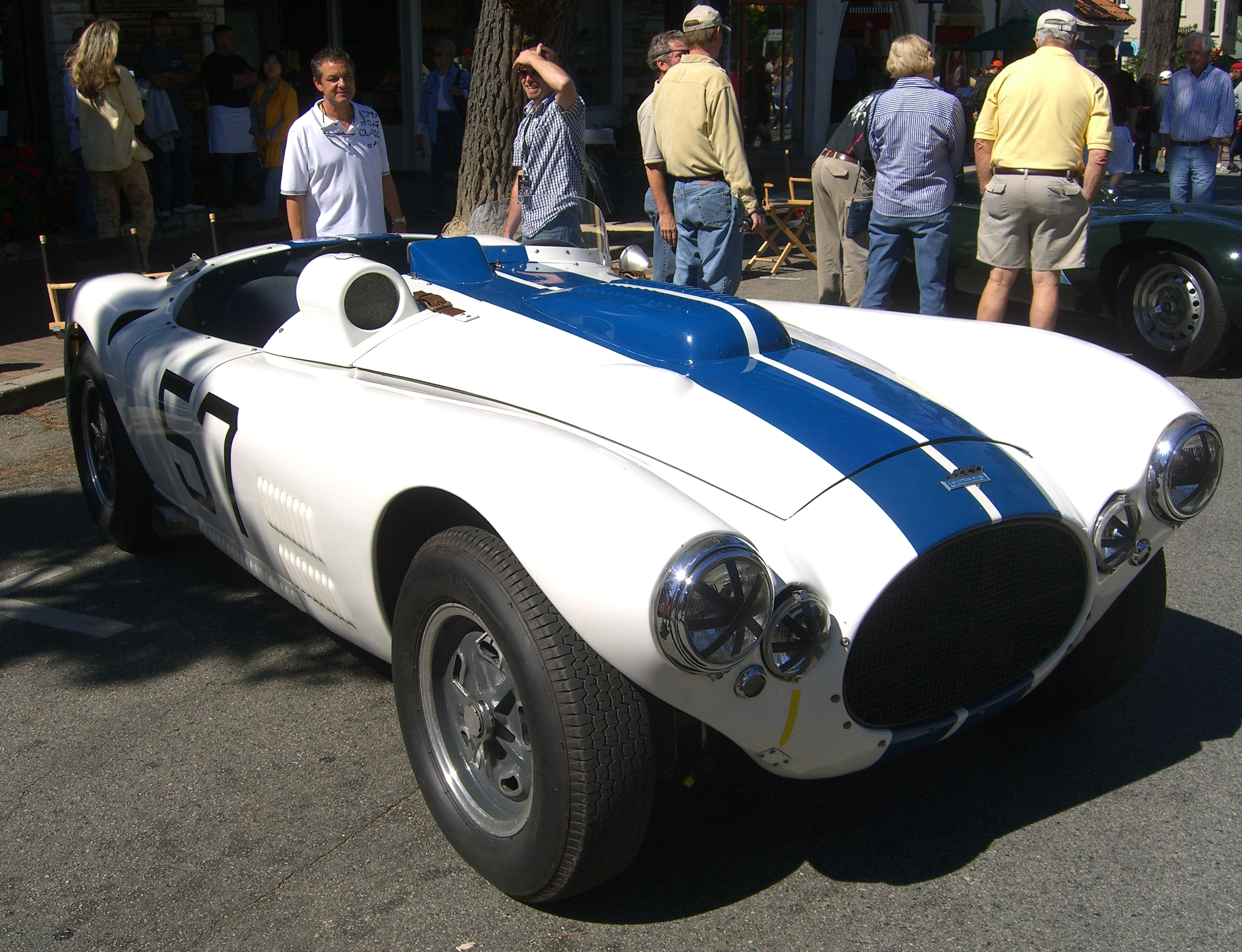
Cunningham C-4R in which Walters won the 1953 12 Hours of Sebring with John Fitch.

Though the Cunningham team did not win at Le Mans, Walters did record a third place in 1953, the car he co-drove with Fitch. They finished the race at an average speed 8 mph faster the winning Mercedes-Benz 300SL the year before, but the disc brakes in the Jaguars gave them an advantage and the Cunningham C-5R took the bottom step of the podium, before two C-Types and just ahead of another. Walters also won the 1953 12 Hours of Sebring with Fitch, against the European factory teams, in the inaugural race of the World Sportscar Championship. The Cunningham team contested the SCCA National Sports Car Championship series in the US, and here Phil won many races, including the Watkins Glen Grand Prix. Walters won three times at the Glen, including the Seneca Cup in 1950, and the Grand Prix of 1951 and 1954. During the 1952 race, he set the fastest lap, exceeding 82 mph on the original 6.6-mile course, which still stands as the official record. Following an accident during this race, the GP was moved to an interim “second course”, with a shortened 4-mile closed course. Walters was the only driver to claim Watkins Glen victories on both the original open-road course and the closed circuit.

Cunningham's idea of the all-American dream team ended with his fifth place in the 1954 24 Hours of Le Mans. This enabled Walters to race competitively with the major European marques of the era. During his time racing for Briggs Cunningham, he drove Cunningham, O.S.C.A., Porsche, Cooper, Ferrari and Jaguar sports cars, on road courses across the US and in Europe. It was in one of Cunningham’s Jaguar D-Types that he his second Sebring title, this time partnered by Englishman, Mike Hawthorn.

His ability brought him an offer from Enzo Ferrari to drive for him, in Formula One just before 1955 Le Mans. However, just before joining the Italian marque, he was a witness to the horrendous tragedy at Le Mans, in which the Mercedes-Benz 300SLR of Pierre Levegh went into the crowd and killed at least 81 spectators. Walters said “I had gotten used to drivers killing each other, but I could not adjust to drivers killing spectators“, and at the age of just 38, he walked away from the sport.

=== Away from the track ===
After motor racing, Walters took up sailboat racing and became an accomplished sailor. With his family as crew, he won the competitive Block Island Regatta, sailing a *Peterson 34 *(The Peterson 34 was named OBSESSION and with Phil Walters and his crew, became known as one of the hottest racing sailboats on the Long Island Sound during the 1970s; having won a very impressive number of races during this decade - including the prestigious Block Island Race Week). In the eight years prior to his death, Phil had been a resident of Homosassa, Florida. Before that, he lived in Syosset and worked in Hicksville, where he ran a car dealership – Walters Donaldson VW-Porsche-Audi of Hicksville, New York.

== Racing record ==
=== Career highlights ===
Season	Series	Position	Team	Car
1950	Seneca Cup	1st	Briggs S. Cunningham	Healey Special Cadillac
1951	100 mile Bridgehampton	2nd	Briggs S. Cunningham	Ferrari 195 S Berlinetta
	Sports Car Grand Prix of Watkins Glen	1st	Briggs S. Cunningham	Cunningham C-2R
	SCCA National Sports Car Championship	26th	Briggs S. Cunningham	Ferrari 195 S Berlinetta; Cunningham C-2R; Healey Special Cadillac; Cooper 500
1952	Giants’ Despair Hillclimb	1st	Briggs S. Cunningham	Cunningham C4-RK
	Brynfan Tyddyn	1st	Briggs S. Cunningham	Porsche 356 America
	The Convair Trophy Race	1st	Briggs S. Cunningham	Cunningham C-4RK
	European Road Races at Thompson Raceway	1st	Briggs S. Cunningham	Cunningham C-4RK
	Elkhart Lake Cup	2nd	Allen S. Guiberson	Ferrari 212 Export
	200 mile Elkhart Lake	2nd	Briggs S. Cunningham	Cunningham C-4R
	SCCA National Sports Car Championship	3rd	Briggs S. Cunningham; William Spear; Allen S. Guiberson	Ferrari 166 MM; Cunningham C-4R; Cunningham C-4RK; Ferrari 212 Export
1953	Vero Beach 6 Hours	3rd	William Spear	Ferrari 166 MM
	Grand Prix, 12 Hours of Sebring	1st	Briggs S. Cunningham	Cunningham C-4R
	Floyd Bennett Cup	1st	Briggs S. Cunningham	Cunningham C-4R
	les 24 Heures du Mans	3rd	Briggs S. Cunningham	Cunningham C-5R
	Turner 250	3rd	Briggs S. Cunningham	Cunningham C-4RK
1954	Gov. Dan McCarthy Memorial Race	2nd	Briggs S. Cunningham	Cunningham C-4R
	Sports Car Grand Prix of Watkins Glen	1st	Briggs S. Cunningham	Cunningham C-4R
	SCCA National Sports Car Championship – Group BM	5th	Briggs S. Cunningham	Cunningham C-4R
	SCCA National Sports Car Championship – Group CM	13th	Briggs S. Cunningham	Ferrari 375 MM
	SCCA National Sports Car Championship – Group DM	14th	Briggs S. Cunningham	Ferrari 250 MM
1955	Twelve Hour Grand Prix of Endurance	1st	Briggs S. Cunningham	Jaguar D-Type

=== Complete 24 Hours of Le Mans results ===
Year	Team	Co-Drivers	Car	Class	Laps	Pos.	Class Pos.
1950	(United States) B. S. Cunningham	(United States) Briggs Cunningham	Cadillac Le Monstre Spider	S8.0	233	11th	3rd
1951	(United States) B. S. Cunningham	(United States) John Fitch	Cunningham C-2R	S8.0	223	18th	1st
1952	(United States) B. S. Cunningham	(United States) Duane Carter	Cunningham C-4RK	S8.0		DNF (engine)	
1953	(United States) Briggs Cunningham	(United States) John Fitch	Cunningham C-5R	S8.0	299	3rd	1st
1954	(United States) Briggs Cunningham	(United States) John Fitch	Ferrari 375 MM	S5.0	120	DNF (Transmission)	
1955	(United States) Briggs Cunningham	(United States) Bill Spear	Jaguar D-Type	S5.0	43	DNF (Valve)	

=== Complete 12 Hours of Sebring results ===
Year	Team	Co-Drivers	Car	Class	Laps	Pos.	Class Pos.
1952	(United States) B. S. Cunningham	(United States) John Fitch	Cunningham C-4R	S8.0	0	DNS (withdrawn)	
1953	(United States) Briggs S. Cunningham	(United States) John Fitch	Cunningham C-4R	S8.0	173	1st	1st
1954	(United States) B. S. Cunningham	(United States) John Fitch	Ferrari 375 MM	S5.0	104	DNF (Engine)	
1955	(United States) B. S. Cunningham	(United Kingdom) Mike Hawthorn	Jaguar D-Type	S5.0	182	1st	1st

=== Complete 12 Hours of Reims results ===
Year	Team	Co-Drivers	Car	Class	Laps	Pos.	Class Pos.
1953	(United States) Briggs Cunningham	(United States) John Fitch	Cunningham C-5R	S+2.0		DNF (Accident)	
1954	(United States) Briggs Cunningham	(United States) John Fitch	Cunningham C-4R	S+2.0	208	6th	

=== Complete Carrera Panamericana results ===
Year	Team	Co-Drivers	Car	Class	Pos.	Class Pos.
1951			Chrysler Saratoga		DNF (accident)	
