= Sherwood Johnston =

American racing driver (1927–2000)

- Nationality: (United States) American
- Born: Sherwood Johnston; 29 September 1927
- Died: 9 November 2000 (aged 73) Eureka, California, U.S.
24 Hours of Le Mans career
- Years: 1954–1955
- Teams: Briggs Cunningham
- Best finish: 3rd (1954)
- Class wins: 1 (1954)

Sherwood Johnston (29 September 1927 – 9 November 2000) was an American racing driver who won racing titles on land and sea. Johnston was active in sports car racing during the 1950s. His greatest success was winning the 1952 SCCA National Sports Car Championship.

== Career ==
Johnston began his career in April 1951, at the Thompson Speedway, in a minor national sports car race in the United States, in a privately entered Jaguar XK120, with a trip to the podium, after finishing in third place. When the SCCA National returned to Thompson in the July, Johnston would pilot the XK120 to two race victories and a third. For the following season, Johnston stepped up to race in the SCCA National full-time. Despite not winning any races outright, he still obtained sufficient points to be crowned champion at the end of the 1952.

As a result of Johnston's success, he came into contact with Briggs Cunningham, and signed for his racing team. Since the contract with Cunningham came into force in the summer, he raced a Jaguar D-Type of Art Feuerbacher, together with Bob Wilder to third place overall in the 12 Hours of Sebring. This was the first World Sports Car Championship race of motorsport history. His first trip to Le Mans saw Johnston entered in three of Cunningham's car, but did not participate in the race. Three weeks later, he had his first European success, when he partnered Briggs Cunningham to third overall in the 12 Hours of Reims, a race that didn't count towards the World Championship.

When Cunningham returned to Le Mans in 1954, Johnston was still part of the driver squad. This time he was partnered by Bill Spear, and together they finished in third place and won their class. He also undertook a number of SCCA National races for Cunningham, in various sports cars, across many classes. He scored enough points to finish second in the B Modified class.

For 1955 visit to Circuit de la Sarthe, Cunningham paired himself with Johnston, but a piston failure ensured the pair did not finish. When the team returned to the US, Johnston started racing the first of Cunningham's Jaguar D-Types, they began winning immediately. Johnston, who had started the SCCA season driving a Ferrari 375 MM, finished the year as champion of SCCA's new C/Sports Racing class, beating a young Californian, Phil Hill in the process.

On 20 May 1956, Johnston's world changed. He was part of the Cunningham team that raced at the Cumberland circuit, in their D-Types. They were joined by amateur driver Walt Hansgen. At the start of the race, Hansgen raced away and left the field behind to win, but Johnston failed to finish the race. A fortnight later, Hansgen would also be a member of the Cunningham team. At Road America, both Johnston and Hansgen rolled their D-Types. After the disaster of the 1955 Le Mans and the accident at Road America proved too much for Johnston to ignore and he retired after finishing third in a SCCA National race at Beverly Airport.

In the summer of 1969, Johnston returned to racing. He had obtained a Lola-Chevrolet T142 to race the SCCA Continental Championship for Formula 5000 cars. His best finish was 9th in the Le Circuit Continental, held at the Circuit Mont-Tremblant. For 1970, Johnston was signed by J & B Racing to race their Surtees-Ford TS5. After failing to finish any of the first four races, he announced at the Monterey Grand Prix, that he was to stop racing as his eyes wouldn’t focus quickly enough between the road and the gauges.

== Achievements ==
In 1955 Johnston received two awards from the SCCA. He was presented with the President's Cup for demonstrating ability, competitiveness and success in the SCCA National Championship. He was also awarded the Kimberly Cup, as the driver who had shown the greatest improvement in the past year.

== Racing record ==
=== Career highlights ===
Season	Series	Position	Team	Car
1952	SCCA National Sports Car Championship	1st		Jaguar XK120
	Burke Mount Hillclimb	2nd		Jaguar XK120
	Seneca Cup	3rd	Garret Fuller	Lagonda Chrysler Special
1953	Grand Prix, 12 Hours of Sebring	3rd	A. H. Feverbacher	Jaguar C-Type
	12 Hours of Reims	3rd	Briggs Cunningham	Cunningham C-4R
1954	SCCA National Sports Car Championship – B Modified	2nd	Briggs Cunningham	Cunningham C-4R; Osca MT4; Kurtis Kraft 500S
	Les 24 Heures du Mans	3rd	Briggs Cunningham	Cunningham C-4R
	International Sports Car Grand Prix of Watkins Glen	3rd	Briggs Cunningham	Cunningham C-4R
1955	SCCA National Sports Car Championship – C Modified	1st	Briggs Cunningham	Ferrari 375 MM; Jaguar D-Type
	Eagle Mountain Hillclimb	1st		Ferrari 375 MM
	International Sports Car Grand Prix of Watkins Glen	1st	Briggs Cunningham	Jaguar D-Type
	The Florida International Twelve Hour Grand Prix of Endurance	3rd	William C. Spear	Maserati 300S
	Governor's Trophy	3rd	Briggs Cunningham	Jaguar D-Type
1956	Torrey Pines 6 Hours	1st	Jerry Austin	Jaguar D-Type
1969	SCCA Continental Championship	23rd		Lola-Chevrolet T142

=== Complete 24 Hours of Le Mans results ===
Year	Team	Co-Drivers	Car	Class	Laps	Pos.	Class Pos.
1954	(United States) Briggs Cunningham	(United States) Bill Spear	Cunningham C-4R	S8.0	283	3rd	1st
1955	(United States) Briggs Cunningham	(United States) Bill Spear	Cunningham C-4R	S8.0	196	DNF (Engine)	

=== Complete 12 Hours of Sebring results ===
Year	Team	Co-Drivers	Car	Class	Laps	Pos.	Class Pos.
1953	(United States) A. H. Feverbacher	(United States) Bob Wilder	Jaguar C-Type	S5.0	162	3rd	1st
1954	(United States) B. S. Cunningham Co.	(United States) Briggs Cunningham	Cunningham C-4R	S8.0	104	DNF (Engine)	
1955	(United States) William C. Spear	(United States) William C. Spear	Maserati 300S	S3.0	180	3rd	2nd
1956	(United States) Jaguar of New York Distributions Inc.	(United States) William C. Spear	Jaguar D-Type	S5.0	127	DNF (Valve)	

=== Complete 12 Hours of Reims results ===
Year	Team	Co-Drivers	Car	Class	Laps	Pos.	Class Pos.
1954	(United States) Briggs Cunningham	(United States) Briggs Cunningham	Cunningham C-4R		212	5th	

Sporting positions
Preceded by John Fitch	SCCA National Sports Car Championship; 1952	Succeeded by Bill Spear
Preceded by Jim Kimberly	SCCA National Sports Car Championship; C Modified class 1955	Succeeded by Walt Hansgen
Preceded by Bill Spear	SCCA President’s Cup; 1955	Succeeded by Walt Hansgen
Preceded by Jim Kimberly	SCCA Kimberly Cup; 1955	Succeeded by Bob Drake
