= Bob Wilder =

American racing driver

- Nationality: (United States) American
- Born: Robert John Wilder, Jr. c. 1921 Palmer, Massachusetts, U.S.
- Died: 22 May 1953 Bridgehampton Race Circuit, U.S.

Robert John Wilder, Jr. (c. 1921 – 22 May 1953) was an American racing driver who competed in the SCCA National Sports Car Championships between 1951 and 1953.

== Career ==
Wilder was a native of Massachusetts. He served 18 months in the United States Air Force during World War II, and then raced from the time he was discharged. His most notable results was a third place in the 1953 12 Hours of Sebring, taking a class win, when he partnered Sherwood Johnston, in a Jaguar C-Type. The season before, he was seventh in the overall SCCA National Sports Car Championship standings, after winning Climb to the Clouds, at the Mount Equinox, and the Burke Mountain Hill Climb, setting hill climbing records in the process.

Historically, Bob and Rowland Keith who were co-drivers on the 1950 Six Hours of Sebring endurance race, were shown as Canadians, as a result of driving a car from a Canadian dealer, despite Bob being the entrant. The pair finished 14th in their MG TC.

== Death ==
On 22 May 1953, the Chicago Tribune reported that Wilder was killed when his Allard J2X Le Mans went out of control during a practice session for the Bridgehampton Sports Car Races. The car struck a depression in the road after crossing a bridge at high speed and rolled over. He was strapped in with a safety belt. His head was crushed.

== Racing record ==
=== Career highlights ===
Season	Series	Position	Team	Car
1951	Mount Equniox Hill Climb	3rd		Allard-Ford J2
1952	Mount Equniox Hill Climb	1st		Allard-Ford J2
	Burke Mount Hill Climb	1st		Allard-Ford J2
	SCCA National Sports Car Championship	7th		Allard-Ford J2
1953	Grand Prix, 12 Hours of Sebring	3rd	A. H. Feverbacher	Jaguar C-Type

=== Complete 12 Hours of Sebring results ===
Year	Team	Co-Drivers	Car	Class	Laps	Pos.	Class Pos.
1953	(United States) A. H. Feverbacher	(United States) Sherwood Johnston	Jaguar C-Type	S5.0	162	3rd	1st
