= 1954 24 Hours of Le Mans =

22nd 24 Hours of Le Mans endurance race

Previous: 1953	Next: 1955
Index: Races | Winners

The 1954 24 Hours of Le Mans was a race for Sports Cars which took place on 12 and 13 June 1954, at the Circuit de la Sarthe, Le Mans, France. It was the 22nd 24 Hours of Le Mans and also the fourth race of the 1954 World Sportscar Championship. The race was won by José Froilán González and Maurice Trintignant driving a Ferrari 375 Plus.

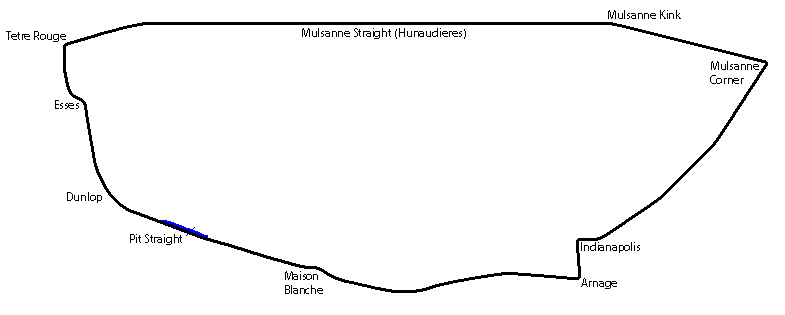
Le Mans in 1954

People viewed this race as a battle between brute force and science (per the July 1954 "Motor Sport" article). In the high technology corner, with its sleek, aerodynamic bodywork was the new 3.4-litre Jaguar D-Type, and in the other corner was Ferrari's formidable 5.0-litre V12 375 Plus. Ranged in between was everyone else. The race was heavily affected by poor weather throughout and was a thriller right to the end, producing the closest finish for the race since 1933: less than 5km (half a lap).

== Regulations ==
The ACO again extended the replenishment window (last updated in 1952) of fuel, oil and water from 28 to 30 laps (405 km) although brake fluid was now exempted from this restriction for safety reasons. The equivalence multiplier for forced-induction engines (i.e. supercharged) was reduced from x2.0 to x1.4.

On the track, the stretch from the corners at Mulsanne to Arnage was widened to 8 metres (finishing the work starting in 1950) and the Indianapolis corner was given a slightly banked camber.

This was the first year the race was aired on TV, which brought more attention to the race.

== Entries ==
After the previous year's intense interest from manufacturers for the new Championship, this year the variety of works teams was reduced: Mercedes had decided to stay focused on F1, Alfa Romeo had closed its racing division, Lancia scratched their team (supposedly daunted by the speed of the Jaguars) and Austin-Healey boycotted the event because of the ongoing presence of the sports-car prototypes. But there were still 85 cars registered for this event, of which a full field of 58 arrived for practice as the remaining manufacturers increased their presence.

As before, Jaguar's sole racing focus for the year was Le Mans and after their 1953 success, they arrived with three of the new Jaguar D-Type - purpose-built for the smooth tarmac of La Sarthe. Engineers had developed a single vertical wing design for the event after wind-tunnel testing. This in addition to the low ride height (only 32 inches (810 mm)) made the vehicle highly aerodynamic. The cars were equipped with a 3.4-litre straight-6 engines redesigned and tilted at 8 degrees (to reduce height, like the Mercedes-Benz 300 SL had done) that developed 250 bhp, enabling a top speed of over 270 km/h. The first chassis prototype, the XKC 401, was completed within 2 months of early Le Mans trials and notably performed the trial laps with an unpainted chassis. The driver line-up was kept pretty much the same from 1953 with winners Tony Rolt / Duncan Hamilton, and 2nd place Stirling Moss / Peter Walker. This year Peter Whitehead was paired with F1 driver Ken Wharton (his former co-driver Ian Stewart was racing with his brother, Graham, at Aston Martin). An ex-works C-Type was provided for the Belgian Ecurie Francorchamps team when their original car was crashed on the way to the circuit by a Jaguar mechanic.

The major Italian works teams, Scuderia Ferrari, Officine Alfieri Maserati and Automobili Osca all brought new cars for this race: Ferrari's answer to the D-type was the new Ferrari 375 Plus: styled by Pinin Farina, it had a bored-out version of the Lampredi-designed V12 engine, now up to 4,954cc and putting out some 345 bhp, (nearly 40% more than the Jaguars) and a top speed approaching 270 km/h. Not as fast as the Jaguar, but its excellent acceleration was a suitable equaliser on a power-circuit such as Le Mans, with its long straights. With three of his best drivers now unavailable – Alberto Ascari was with Lancia, Giuseppe Farina had been injured in the Mille Miglia and Mike Hawthorn's father had just died suddenly – Ferrari could still field a top team of drivers: three of them - Umberto Maglioli, José Froilán González and Maurice Trintignant were in the current Ferrari F1 works team. With them were Paolo Marzotto (the only works finisher in the 1953 race), ex-Gordini driver Robert Manzon (like Trintignant) and Louis Rosier, 1952 race winner with Talbot. They were backed up three other Ferraris entered by Briggs Cunningham's and Luigi Chinetti's American teams. Glamour came with Chinetti's team with film star Zsa Zsa Gabor accompanying her rich playboy-boyfriend, Dominican Porfirio Rubirosa.

Maserati had taken over the Formula 1 world in early 1954 with its outstanding 250F winning the first two races. They had also developed an uprated version of their A6GCS sportscar, replacing the 2.0-litre engine with the 2.5L version from the 250F. A standard 2.0-litre version was also privately entered, with factory support, for the Marquess of Portago. OSCA had started the year sensationally when a 1500cc MT-4 entered by Cunningham and driven by Stirling Moss and Bill Lloyd won the Sebring 12-hours against far more powerful opposition. Three such cars arrived at Le Mans.

Always looking to be competitive, as well as running the Ferrari 375 MM (because Ferrari had refused to sell him an engine for his own cars), Cunningham had tried to secure the new Dunlop disc brakes for his cars. However Jaguar used its contract-right to veto the deal. He arrived with a pair of the older Cunningham C-4R roadsters for his regular driver complement– the sole entrants in the Over-5 litre class.

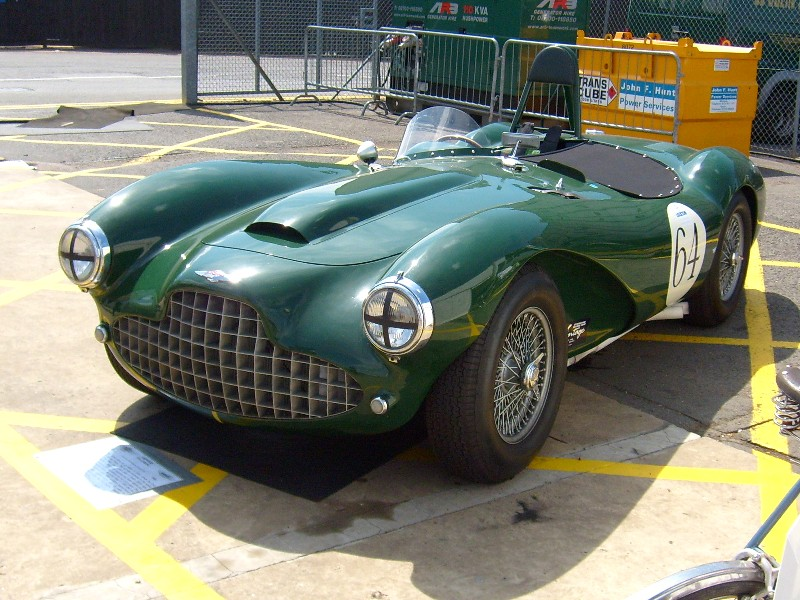
Lagonda DP115 V12, driven by Thompson and Poore. During the race it wore #7.

It was a big entry for Lagonda-Aston Martin with five works cars and two private entries. One of the two DB3S spyders had a supercharged 2.9L engine that developed 235 bhp driven by British F1 drivers Reg Parnell and Roy Salvadori, the other was run by Carroll Shelby. Alongside them were a pair of aerodynamic coupés & the long-running, expensive Lagonda sports car with a 4.5L V12 (effectively a double-Aston Martin engine) Gordini arrived with four cars, competing in three classes. The lead car, a T24S driven by Behra and Simon, had a 3.0L engine developing 230 bhp and new Messier disc brakes was capable of over 230 km/h. Gordini also entered a pair of older T15S, also with disc-brakes but with 2.5L and 2.0L engines respectively. Talbot sent no works team this year but supplied an improved 4.5L engine (now capable of 280 bhp) for the T26 spyders of the three private entries (Levegh, Meyrat, Grignard).

In the S-2000 class Bristol returned with three coupés developed from the previous year's model, with better styling and improved aerodynamics. There were also three Frazer-Nashes, using the same Bristol engine, as well as the first entries in the race for Triumph (an off-the shop-floor TR2) and Maserati.

Porsche returned with three cars to contest the S-1500 category against the OSCAs. The Porsche 550s were given the new quad-cam Porsche 547 engine making 110 bhp and 210 km/h, and this year were open-top spyders. Another was also given a smaller 1089cc engine for the S-1100 class. The small British sportscar firm Kieft arrived with two cars to take on the smallest Porsche – bringing the first fibreglass chassis to Le Mans. One was also the first car with the new Coventry Climax FWA engine.

The small-engine classes were well-represented, and again dominated by the French Renault and Panhard derivatives. This year DB had five cars present that comprised a pair of the tiny new central-seat HBR model with Panhard engines and three HDR models using rear-engined Renault power. Panhard itself, now with a full racing department, had 4 works entries built by Monopole who also had their own entry.

== Practice ==
Jaguar was able to get an unofficial practice in May on the full track in an unrelated event and Tony Rolt took the prototype D-type round fully 5 seconds faster than Alberto Ascari's lap record from the previous year in the Indy-engined Ferrari. In the official practice, all three works cars recorded identical times. and they and the Ferraris were a step up from the rest of the field. Overall, the Jaguars had better handling, disc brakes and were faster (Moss was timed at 154.44 mph/278 km/h over the flying kilometre, giving a huge 20 km/h advantage), but the Ferrari had superior power and acceleration. The supercharged Aston Martin, the Lagonda, and the Porsches were also impressively quick.

Unfortunately the Maserati works transporter broke down en route to the track and the car had to be withdrawn as it arrived too late for scrutineering. The Marquess of Portago was able to take the start however, as he had driven his own car direct from the Modena factory in Italy.

Controversially, Gilberte Thirion qualified the 2-litre works Gordini but was excluded from competing because of her gender (only three years after the Coupe des Dames was awarded to female drivers) – her father drove in her stead in the race.

== Race ==
=== Start ===
At 4pm the race was started under dark clouds by Prince Bernhard, consort of Queen Juliana of the Netherlands, and an avid motor-racing fan. It came as no surprise when the mighty 375's of González, Marzotto and Manzon stormed away in 1-2-3 formation at the start, with Moss, Rolt and Wharton (who had a startline collision) in close pursuit. After only five laps the first heavy downpour arrived, negating the Ferrari power advantage. By the end of the first hour, González and Marzotto and Moss had a gap over Rolt, and Manzon. The rest of the field was already a lap down. Forty minutes later on lap 22, still in heavy rain, Moss managed to take the lead, starting the to-and–fro battle between the two marques. Wharton had been held up in the first hour with a blocked fuel filter and over the next couple of hours, the other two Jaguars suffered engine misfires giving the Ferraris a lap's lead over the field. Walker stopped out on the track for 50 minutes, but the Moss/Walker car would not be staging an epic comeback this year. Meanwhile, Behra's Gordini and Fitch's Cunningham were regularly trading places in the top-10, mimicking the disc-brakes versus power battle at the front. However soon after 7pm, Behra pitted with ignition problems and then stopped out on the track beyond Mason Blanche. He pushed the car all the way back to the pits to get going again, but it eventually retired in the middle of the night.

A number of other cars had been caught out in the rain: On only lap 5 Count Baggio planted the playboy Ferrari right into the Tertre Rouge sandbank and could not dig it out (so Rubirosa never got a chance to drive for his movie-star girlfriend). The other American Ferrari, of Fitch/Walters, was running 6th when a rocker-arm broke, dropping them out of the running while the engine was repaired. Eric Thompson spun the Lagonda backwards into the bank at the Esses. After nearly 2hours to get it mobile and back to the pits it was retired because the rear lights were too badly damaged and deemed unsafe.

After four hours, at 8pm, González and Marzotto were lapping together, still having not swapped with their respective co-drivers, and a lap ahead of Rosier and Whitehead. Salvadori was fifth in the supercharged Aston, then Hamilton and the two Aston coupés, the Belgian Jaguar and Cunningham's own car filling out the top ten.

=== Night ===
At 9.30pm, the Talbot of Meyrat collided with the Aston Martin of 'Jimmy' Stewart as both were lapping a slower car in the fast section coming up to Maison Blanche. Meyrat ended in the hedgerows, but the Aston Martin rolled throwing Stewart clear. The car was completely written off and Stewart was very lucky to only suffer a serious arm break (that eventually contributed to his retirement from racing). The mid-evening showers caused another flurry of accidents and retirements, including Levegh who was in 8th place when he spun and wrecked his Talbot's suspension. As the rain finally eased off Wharton and Whitehead made a strong comeback, getting back to 3rd which became 2nd when the Maglioli/Manzon Ferrari broke its gearbox just after 11pm.

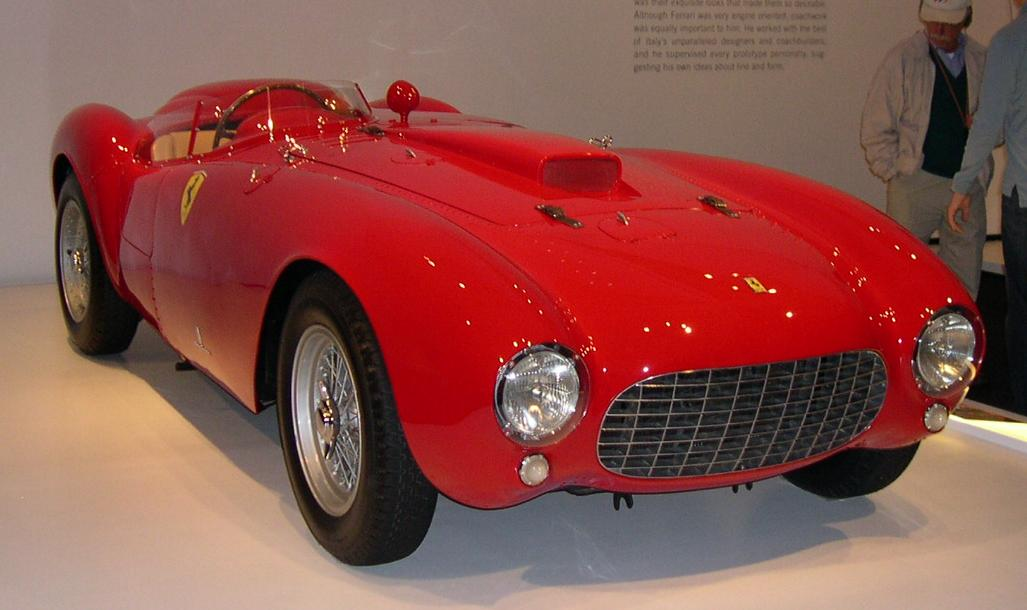
1954 Ferrari 375 Plus, the same type driven by race winners González/Trintignant

The D-types were now steadily hauling themselves back into contention. At midnight González/Trintignant were two laps ahead of Whitehead/Wharton. Manzon/Rosier were third, ahead of Rolt/Hamilton and the Aston Martins of Parnell/Salvadori and Collins/Bira completing the top six. The rain returned and the lead Jaguar had to pit again with fuel-line issues. After several more pitstops it finally retired with a broken gearbox. It joined Moss' car that had become undriveable after he had a total brake failure at the end of the Mulsanne straight doing 160 mph (taking two miles to stop on the escape road with hand-brake and gearbox!) Rolt and Hamilton however, managed to move into 2nd place by half-time, albeit still two laps adrift. Third was the other Ferrari, followed by the Spear/Johnston Cunningham and the supercharged Aston Martin. Just afterward, in an unusual co-incidence, Prince Bira crashed his Aston Martin, while running in 4th place, within yards of Thompson's Aston coupé that had crashed earlier. In the next hour, the Herrmann/Polensky Porsche, leading the S-1500 class and an impressive 7th place overall, retired with a blown head gasket. This left Macklin leading the class in the OSCA, a full 20 laps ahead of the Bristol leading the S-2000 class

=== Morning ===
As dawn arrived the Ferrari of Rosier/Manzon, running third, retired with a broken gearbox, jammed in second gear. Now the battle was reduced to just one car for each team at the front of the field. The clouds built up and rain became an ever-present threat, which would be advantageous for the aerodynamic D-types.

By breakfast time, the rain started to come down very heavily and the stage was set for a heroic chase. González and Trintignant could afford to take things cautiously, but any unnecessary delays would enable the pursuing Jaguar to open up a chink the Ferrari's armour, and as the rain intensified, the sole remaining D-type piled on the pressure. But Trintignant responded and both cars roared round doing sub-4'30" lap-times. By 9.30am, after González's fuel stop when the Ferrari hesitated in restarting, the Jaguar team got more motivation and the lead was down to 3 minutes. But at 10am, Rolt glanced the bank coming out of Arnage lapping a slower car, and 2 minutes were lost in the pits for a bout of impromptu panelbeating.

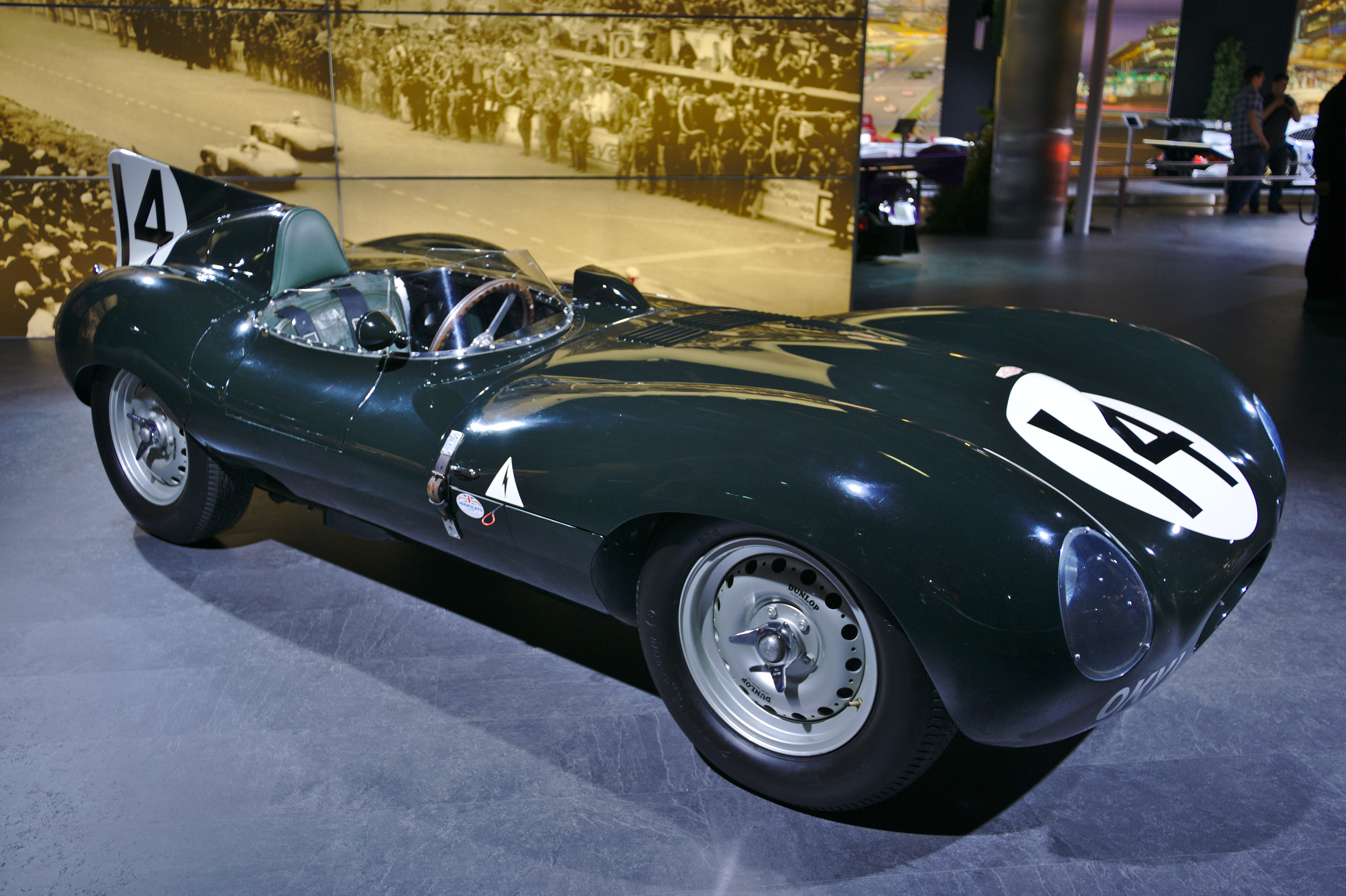
Jaguar D-Type of Hamilton/Rolt, which placed 2nd overall.

The rain then eased during the morning, allowing the Ferrari to use its power to better effect, but still the Jaguar would not give up. Despite this, the race order remained fairly constant and at midday the order was still Ferrari, Jaguar, Cunningham, Jaguar, Cunningham, Aston Martin, Gordini and the OSCA as the leading small-engined car. The two remaining Porsches were running slowly, trying to get to the end of the race. The supercharged Aston Martin had been running surprisingly well all race until just after midday when a head-gasket failure caused its retirement. Around 1pm a ferocious squall slowed all the cars to a snail's pace, then the Jaguar drivers began to close the gap again on Trintignant as the track dried.

=== Finish and post-race ===
With just two hours left to run, González and Trintignant were still almost two laps ahead of the English car. Ninety minutes to run and Trintignant brought the Ferrari in for a routine stop. González took over, but the V12 refused to restart. The Ferrari lost 7 minutes as the mechanics desperately worked on the engine. The rain started again and Rolt was now in sight: he came in to stop for new goggles, but his pit crew waved him on, and now the Jaguar was on the same lap as the leader.

Finally the Ferrari mechanics found the problem: the rain had saturated the ignition wiring. When González finally got going he was now only 3'14" ahead of the Jaguar. With thunder and lightning now lashing the circuit and unable to see, Rolt pitted and handed over to Hamilton for the final assault with an hour to go. Hamilton then put in extraordinary times in the rain, cutting the lead to just 90 seconds. González was exhausted (he had not eaten or slept through the weekend) and his lap times dropped to 5'30", but his pit-crew urged him on and as the rain stopped with a half-hour to go, and the track dried out, he was once more able to bring the power of the Ferrari to bear again and extend the gap. Finally able to ease off on the final lap, González crossed the line to win by just under three minutes - but still the closest finish in the race since 1933.

Meanwhile, in the smaller classes, the pair of works OSCAs had an ample lead of 15 laps over the struggling Porsches and running in the top-10 overall. Yet within ten minutes, with just 2 hours to go, everything fell apart. First, the leading one of Giardini crashed and rolled at Mulsanne, then the one running second hit the barriers at Dunlop curve. Pierre Leygonie ran the short distance back to the pits to get equipment and advice from the pit-crew. He managed to get it going again and back to the pits to hand over to Lance Macklin but they were then disqualified at race-end for having abandoned the car. To round off a bitter race for OSCA, their last car was running second in the S-1100 class but its transmission broke in the final laps of the race.

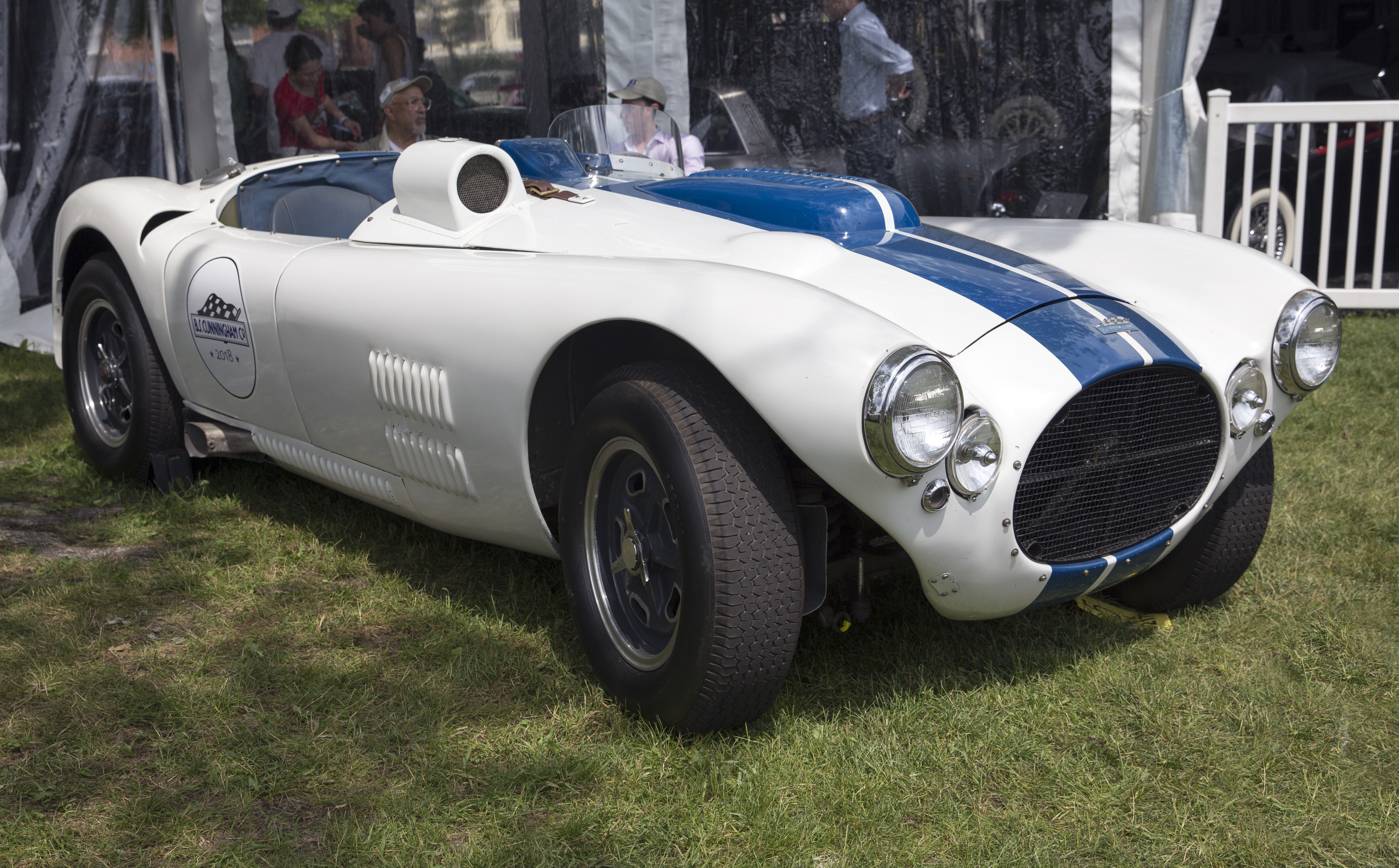
Cunningham C4-R of Spear/Johnston, which finished 3rd overall and won the S 8.0 class.

Despite the atrocious weather, González and Trintignant had still driven their Ferrari 375 Plus through 302 laps, just 2 laps less than the year before, and covering over 2,500 miles (4,000 km). In his delight, Prince Bernhard jumped aboard with Trintignant for his victory lap in the rain. In the end it came down to pit-time: 37 minutes for the Jaguar versus 29 minutes for the Ferrari. The podium was completed by the American pair, William "Bill" Spear and Sherwood Johnston, in their Cunningham C-4R, who were far behind, 19 laps (over 250 km) back, Briggs himself came in 5th. Despite their very reliable Chrysler engines, the Cunninghams were unable to match the pace of the leaders. Splitting the two American cars was the Belgian Jaguar which had run like clockwork despite not getting any pre-race testing. The last remaining Gordini came in 6th earning a special FF1 million prize as first French car home. After the demise of the OSCAs, Porsche inherited class wins in the S-1500, and S-1100, by having the only cars left running in their classes.

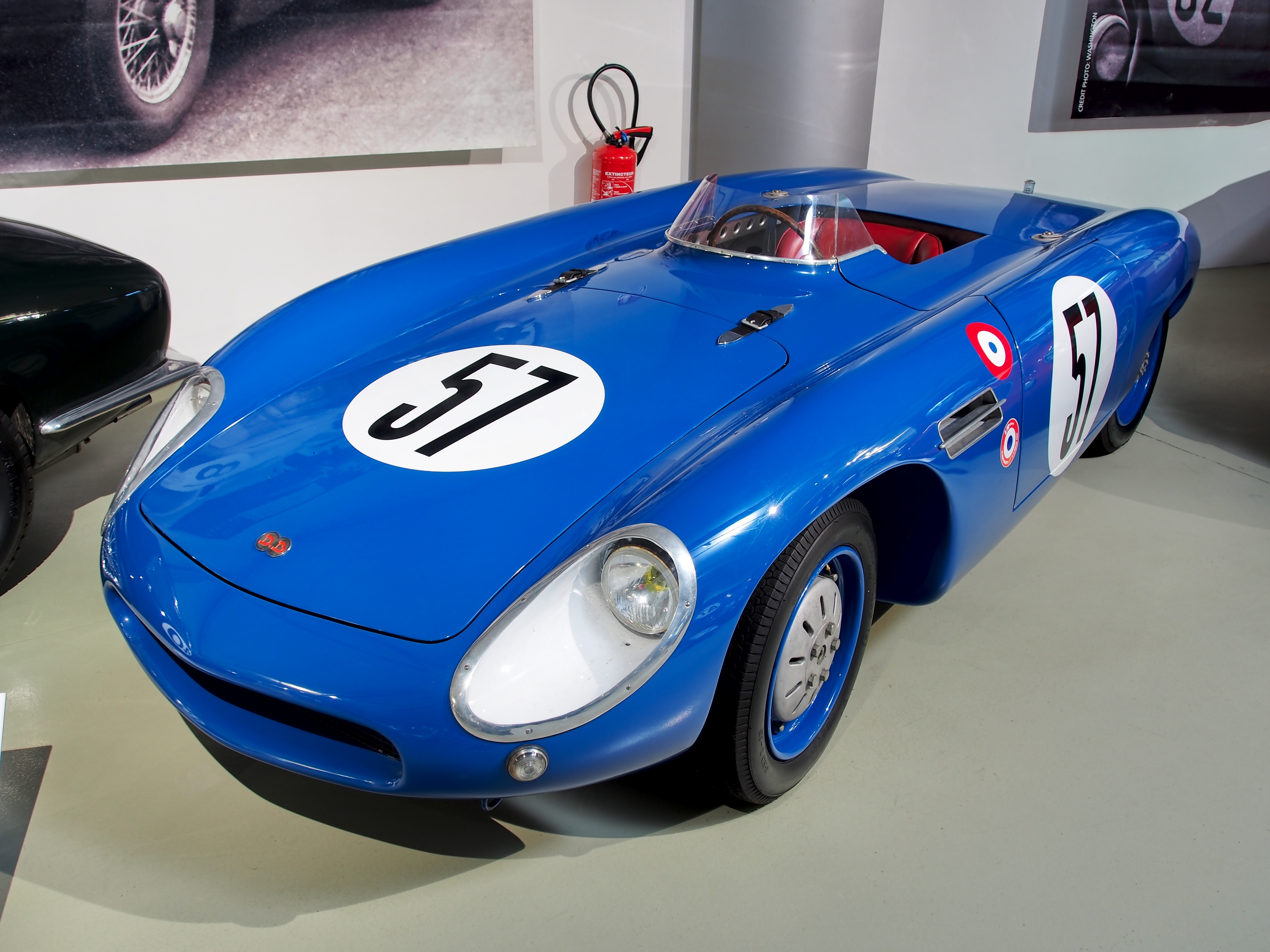
The DB HBR of Bonnet/Bayol, which won the S 750 class and the Index of Performance.

Bristol had a great race: finishing 6-7-8 overall and a clear 1-2-3 in their class. Although running most of the race behind the smaller OSCA, their leader finished over 30 laps ahead of the only class-competitor Fraser-Nash to finish. Aside from a window-wiper making life difficult for Wilson/Mayers (they had to drive at times with the door open to see out!) and Jack Fairman spinning with less than an hour to go (thereby losing the class win) they had a trouble-free run. The little DB cars also had one of their best races – finally winning the Index of Performance, as well as the Biennial Cup. Owner-driver René Bonnet and Élie Bayol finished a remarkable 10th overall with a class-distance record (going further than Nuvolari's winning Alfa Romeo 20 years earlier), embarrassing many far-bigger cars left in their wake. The Monopole entry was second in class, but had the remarkable record of having spent a mere five minutes and ten seconds at rest in the pits for the whole race.

One who did not finish was the last Talbot running – after numerous issues with engine and gearbox problems, the pit crew sent it out with ten minutes to go to do the final lap, but it could not complete it within 30 minutes and so was not classified.

The Argentinian winner earned a special place in Ferrari history: Three years earlier, he had scored Ferrari's first F1 victory. Now, in his last appearance at La Sarthe, he also gave the first victory for the Scuderia Ferrari at Le Mans. The weather had precluded any chance of breaking distance records, although in the dry both González and Marzotto had smashed Ascari's lap record by over 10 seconds.

Despite its abortive attempt in this race, the 2-litre Maserati proved dominant across Europe, winning over 20 class wins in the season. In October, DB inaugurated the first one-make race series, Formula Monomill for young drivers, using an 851cc DB-Panhard. The first race, at Montlhéry, was won by Jo Schlesser.

The Porsche 550s had great success in the Championship's final round, in the Carrera Panamericana, with Herrmann finishing an excellent 3rd overall. The year before they had a class win, and the name 'Carrera' was applied to the 356 road-cars with the quad-cam engine. Many sales followed to privateer racers, furthering the company's racing reputation.

== Official results ==
Results taken from Quentin Spurring's book, officially licensed by the ACO

Pos	Class	No	Team	Drivers	Chassis	Engine	Laps
1	S 5.0	4	(Italy) Scuderia Ferrari	(Argentina) José Froilán González (France) Maurice Trintignant	Ferrari 375 Plus	Ferrari 5.0L V12	302
2	S 5.0	14	(United Kingdom) Jaguar Cars Ltd.	(United Kingdom) Duncan Hamilton (United Kingdom) Tony Rolt	Jaguar D-Type	Jaguar 3.4L S6	301
3	S 8.0	2	(United States) Briggs Cunningham	(United States) William "Bill" Spear (United States) Sherwood Johnston	Cunningham C-4R	Chrysler 5.5L V8	283
4	S 5.0	16	(Belgium) Ecurie Francorchamps	(Belgium) Roger Laurent (Belgium) Jacques Swaters	Jaguar C-Type	Jaguar 3.4L S6	277
5	S 8.0	1	(United States) Briggs Cunningham	(United States) Briggs Cunningham (United States) John Gordon Bennett	Cunningham C-4R	Chrysler 5.5L V8	274
6	S 3.0	30	(France) Equipe Gordini	(France) Jacques Pollet (France) André Guelfi	Gordini T15S	Gordini 2.5L S6	263
7	S 2.0	35	(United Kingdom) Bristol Aeroplane Company	(United Kingdom) Peter Wilson (United Kingdom) Jim Mayers	Bristol 450	Bristol 1979cc S6	260
8	S 2.0	33	(United Kingdom) Bristol Aeroplane Company	(United Kingdom) Tommy Wisdom (United Kingdom) Jack Fairman	Bristol 450	Bristol 1979cc S6	257
9	S 2.0	34	(United Kingdom) Bristol Aeroplane Company	(United Kingdom) Mike Keen (United Kingdom) Trevor Line	Bristol 450	Bristol 1979cc S6	255
10	S 750	57	(France) Automobiles Deutsch et Bonnet	(France) René Bonnet (France) Élie Bayol	DB HBR-MC	Panhard 745cc F2	240
11	S 2.0	36	(United Kingdom) Automobiles Frazer Nash Ltd.	(Netherlands) Maurice Gatsonides (France) Marcel Becquart	Frazer Nash Le Mans Coupé	Bristol 1970cc S6	228
12	S 1.5	39	(West Germany) Porsche KG	(Belgium) Johnny Claes (Belgium) Pierre Stasse	Porsche 550/4 RS Spyder	Porsche 1497cc F4	228
13	S 750	55	(France) Établissements; Monopole	(France) Jean Hémard (France) Pierre Flahaut	Monopole X84	Panhard 612cc F2	222
14	S 1.1	47	(West Germany) Porsche KG	(United States) Zora Arkus-Duntov (France) Gonzague Olivier	Porsche 550/4 RS Spyder	Porsche 1089cc F4	216
N/C *	S 2.0	62; Reserve	(United Kingdom) E.B. Wadsworth (private entrant)	(United Kingdom) Edgar Wadsworth (United Kingdom) John Brown	Triumph TR2	Triumph 2.0L I4	214
15	S 750	56	(France) Ecurie Jeudy-Bonnet	(France) Marc Gignoux (France) Louis Cornet	DB HBR-MC	Panhard 745cc F2	213
N/C **	S 5.0	11	(France) G. Grignard (private entrant)	(France) Jean Blanc (France) Serge Nersessian	Talbot T26 GS Spyder	Talbot 4.6L S6	206
16	S 750	59	(France) Automobiles Panhard et Levassor	(France) René Cotton (France) André Beaulieux	Panhard-Monopole X88	Panhard 612cc F2	195
17	S 750	54	(France) P. Garzynski (private entrant)	(France) René Breuil (France) Jean Py	BG Le Mans Coupé	Renault 747cc S4	194

- Note *: Not Classified for insufficient distance (car failed to cover 70% of its class-winner's distance)
- Note **: Not Classified for failing to complete the final lap of the race in under 30 minutes

== Did not finish ==
Pos	Class	No	Team	Drivers	Chassis	Engine	Laps	Reason
DSQ	S 1.5	43	(Italy) Automobili O.S.C.A.	(United Kingdom) Lance Macklin (France) Pierre Leygonie (United States) James Simpson	O.S.C.A. MT-4	O.S.C.A. 1500cc S4	247	Abandoned vehicle
DNF	S 1.5	42	(Italy) Automobili O.S.C.A.	(France) Jacques Péron (Italy) Francesco Giardini	O.S.C.A. MT-4	O.S.C.A. 1490cc S4	243	Accident (23hr)
DNF	S 5.0	8	(United Kingdom) Aston Martin Lagonda	(United Kingdom) Reg Parnell (United Kingdom) Roy Salvadori	Aston Martin DB3S	Aston Martin 2.9L S6; Supercharged	222	Engine (21hr)
DNF	S 1.1	63; Reserve	(France) L. Farnaud (private entrant)	(France) Lucien Farnaud (Italy) Adolfo Macchieraldo	O.S.C.A. MT-4	O.S.C.A. 1092cc S4	199	Transmission (24hr)
DNF	S 750	49	(France) Automobiles VP	(France) Just-Emile Vernet (France) Yves Giraud-Cabantous	VP 166R	Renault 747cc S4	190	Accident (22hr)
DNF	S 5.0	5	(Italy) Scuderia Ferrari	(France) Robert Manzon (France) Louis Rosier	Ferrari 375 Plus	Ferrari 5.0L V12	177	Transmission (15hr)
DNF	S 750	58	(France) Automobiles Panhard et Levassor	(France) Pierre Chancel (France) Robert Chancel	Panhard-Monopole X88	Panhard 612cc F2	157	Engine (17hr)
DNF	S 1.5	41	(West Germany) Porsche KG	(West Germany) Hans Herrmann (West Germany) Helmut Polensky	Porsche 550/4 RS Spyder	Porsche 1497cc F4	148	Electrics (14hr)
DNF	S 3.0	20	(United Kingdom) Aston Martin Lagonda	(Thailand) "B.Bira" Prince Birabongse Bhanubandh (United Kingdom) Peter Collins	Aston Martin DB3S Coupé	Aston Martin 2.9L S6	138	Accident (13hr)
DNF	S 5.0	15	(United Kingdom) Jaguar Cars Ltd.	(United Kingdom) Peter Whitehead (United Kingdom) Ken Wharton	Jaguar D-Type	Jaguar 3.4L S6	131	Transmission (13hr)
DNF	S 3.0	27	(France) J.-P. Colas (private entrant)	(France) Jean-Paul Colas (Brazil) Hermano da Silva Ramos	Aston Martin DB2/4 'Vignale'	Aston Martin 2.9L S6	121	Transmission (14hr)
DNF	S 5.0	6	(United States) Briggs Cunningham	(United States) Phil Walters (United States) John Fitch	Ferrari 375 MM	Ferrari 4.5L V12	120	Transmission (13hr)
DNF	S 2.0	28	(Italy) Officine Alfieri Maserati	(Spain) Marquis Alfonso de Portago (Italy) Carlo Tomasi	Maserati A6GCS/53	Maserati 1986cc S6	116	Engine (11hr)
DSQ	S 2.0	38	(United Kingdom) Automobiles Frazer Nash Ltd. (Sweden) Sture Nottorp	(Sweden) Sture Nottorp (Sweden) Ivar Andersson	Frazer Nash Le Mans Coupé	Bristol 1979cc S6	109	Premature refuelling (11hr)
DNF	S 750	52	(France) Ecurie Jeudy-Bonnet	(France) Marc Azéma (France) Alphonse de Burnay	DB HDR-MC	Renault 747cc S4	102	Wheels (13hr)
DNF	S 2.0	44	(France) A. Constantin (private entrant)	(France) Alexis Constantin (France) Edmond Mouche	Constantin-Peugeot 203C Spyder	Peugeot 1425cc S4; Supercharged	95	Transmission (13hr)
DNF	S 5.0	12	(United Kingdom) Jaguar Cars Ltd.	(United Kingdom) Stirling Moss (United Kingdom) Peter Walker	Jaguar D-Type	Jaguar 3.4L S6	92	Brakes (12hr)
DNF	S 5.0	3	(Italy) Scuderia Ferrari	(Italy) Umberto Maglioli (Italy) Paolo Marzotto	Ferrari 375 Plus	Ferrari 5.0L V12	88	Transmission (8hr)
DNF	S 1.1	46	(United Kingdom) Kieft Cars Ltd.	(United Kingdom) Alan Rippon (United Kingdom) Bill Black	Kieft Sport	Coventry Climax 1098cc S4	86	Transmission (11hr)
DNF	S 1.1	65; Reserve	(France) Equipe Gordini	(Belgium) André Pilette (Belgium) Max Thirion	Gordini T17S	Gordini 1096cc S4	76	Engine (11hr)
DNF	S 3.0	19	(France) Equipe Gordini	(France) Jean Behra (France) André Simon	Gordini T24S	Gordini 3.0L S8	76	Engine (11hr)
DNF	S 3.0	22	(United Kingdom) Aston Martin Lagonda	(United States) Carroll Shelby (Belgium) Paul Frère	Aston Martin DB3S	Aston Martin 2.9L S6	74	Front Axle (11hr)
DNF	S 750	50	(France) G. Michel / A. Guillard (private entrant)	(France) Guy Michel (France) André Guillard	Renault 4CV-1063 Spyder	Renault 747cc S4	73	Engine (11hr)
DNF	S 3.0	21	(United Kingdom) Aston Martin Lagonda	(United Kingdom) Ian Stewart (United Kingdom) Graham Whitehead	Aston Martin DB3S Coupé	Aston Martin 2.9L S6	64	Accident (7hr)
DNF	S 5.0	9	(France) Ecurie Rosier	(France) Jean-Louis Rosier (France) Pierre Meyrat	Talbot-Lago T26 GS Spyder	Talbot-Lago 4.5L S6	62	Accident (7hr)
DNF	S 2.0	31	(France) Equipe Gordini	(France) André Moynet (France) Clarence de Rinen	Gordini T15S	Gordini 1988cc S6	54	Electrics (7hr)
DNF	S 2.0	37	(United Kingdom) Automobiles Frazer Nash Ltd.	(United Kingdom) Rodney 'Roy' Peacock (United Kingdom) Gerry Ruddock	Frazer Nash LMC/Targa Florio	Bristol 1970cc S6	49	Accident (7hr)
DNF	S 5.0	10	(France) 'Pierre Levegh' (private entrant)	(France) "Pierre Levegh" (Pierre Bouillin) (France) Lino Fayen	Talbot-Lago T26 GS Spyder	Talbot-Lago 4.5L S6	33	Accident (7hr)
DNF	S 1.1	48	(United Kingdom) Kieft Cars Ltd.	(France) Georges Trouis (United Kingdom) Alfred Hitchings	Kieft Sport	MG 1087cc S4	26	Cooling (7hr)
DNF	S 5.0	7	(United Kingdom) Aston Martin Lagonda	(United Kingdom) Eric Thompson (United Kingdom) Dennis Poore	Lagonda DP115	Lagonda 4.5L V12	25	Accident (4hr)
DSQ	S 750	66; Reserve	(France) J. Faucher (private entrant)	(France) Jacques Faucher (France) Jean Hébert	Renault 4CV-1063	Renault 747cc S4	20	?
DNF	S 750	51	(France) Automobiles Deutsch et Bonnet	(France) "Heldé" (Pierre-Louis Dreyfus) (Belgium) "Eldé" (Leon Dernier) (France) Jean Lucas	DB HDR-MC	Renault 747cc S4	8	Transmission (1hr)
DNF	S 750	53	(Italy) Nardi Automobili	(Italy) Dr. Mario Damonte (France) Alexandre Gacon	Nardi 750LM	Crosley 747cc S4	7	Water pump (1hr)
DNF	S 5.0	18	(United States) Luigi Chinetti	(Italy) Conte Innocente Baggio (Dominican Republic) Porfirio Rubirosa	Ferrari 375 MM Berlinetta	Ferrari 4.5L V12	5	Accident (2hr)
DNF	S 750	60	(France) Automobiles Panhard et Levassor	(France) Lucien Pailler (France) "Franc" (Jacques Dewez)	Panhard-Monopole X88 Coupé	Panhard 611cc F2	5	Accident (1hr)
DNF	S 1.5	40	(West Germany) Porsche KG	(West Germany) Richard von Frankenberg (West Germany) Helmut 'Helm' Glöckler	Porsche 550/4 RS Spyder	Porsche 1497cc F4	4	Engine (1hr)
DNF	S 750	64; Reserve	(France) Ecurie Jeudy-Bonnet	(France) Claude Storez (France) Jean-Claude Vidilles (France) Jean Lucas	DB HDR-MC	Renault 747cc S4	4	Transmission (1hr)
DNF	S 750	61	(France) Automobiles Panhard et Levassor	(France) Eugène Dussous (France) Jacques Savoye	Panhard-Monopole X84	Panhard 611cc F2	0	Accident (1hr)
DNS	S 3.0	23	(United Kingdom) N. Mann (private entrant)	(United Kingdom) Nigel Mann (United Kingdom) Charles Brackenbury	Aston Martin DB3	Aston Martin 2.9L S6	0	
DNA	S 3.0	29	(Italy) Officine Alfieri Maserati	(France) "Mike Sparken" (Michel Pobejersky) (Argentina) Roberto Mieres (France) John 'Jonny' Simone	Maserati A6GCS/53	Maserati 2.5L S4	-	too late for scrutineering

== Index of Performance ==
Pos	Class	No	Team	Drivers	Chassis	Score
1	S 750	57	(France) Automobiles Deutsch et Bonnet	(France) René Bonnet (France) Élie Bayol	DB HBR-MC	1.334
2	S 750	55	(France) Établissements; Monopole	(France) Jean Hémard (France) Pierre Flahaut	Monopole X84	1.310
3	S 5.0	14	(United Kingdom) Jaguar Cars Ltd.	(United Kingdom) Duncan Hamilton (United Kingdom) Tony Rolt	Jaguar D-Type	1.297
4	S 5.0	4	(Italy) Scuderia Ferrari	(Argentina) José Froilán González (France) Maurice Trintignant	Ferrari 375 Plus	1.284
5	S 8.0	2	(United States) Briggs Cunningham	(United States) William "Bill" Spear (United States) Sherwood Johnston	Cunningham C-4R	1.205
6	S 5.0	16	(Belgium) Ecurie Francorchamps	(Belgium) Roger Laurent (Belgium) Jacques Swaters	Jaguar C-Type	1.191
7	S 2.0	35	(United Kingdom) Bristol Aeroplane Company	(United Kingdom) Peter Wilson (United Kingdom) Jim Mayers	Bristol 450	1.187
8	S 750	56	(France) Ecurie Jeudy-Bonnet	(France) Marc Gignoux (France) Louis Cornet	DB HBR-MC	1.183
9	S 2.0	33	(United Kingdom) Bristol Aeroplane Company	(United Kingdom) Tommy Wisdom (United Kingdom) Jack Fairman	Bristol 450	1.174
10	S 3.0	30	(France) Equipe Gordini	(France) Jacques Pollet (France) André Guelfi	Gordini T15S	1.169

- Note: Only the top ten positions are included in this set of standings. A score of 1.00 means meeting the minimum distance for the car, and a higher score is exceeding the nominal target distance.

== 20th Rudge-Whitworth Biennial Cup (1953/1954) ==
Pos	Class	No	Team	Drivers	Chassis	Score
1	S 750	57	(France) Automobiles Deutsch et Bonnet	(France) René Bonnet (France) Élie Bayol	DB HBR-MC	1.334
2	S 5.0	14	(United Kingdom) Jaguar Cars Ltd.	(United Kingdom) Duncan Hamilton (United Kingdom) Tony Rolt	Jaguar D-Type	1.297
3	S 8.0	2	(United States) Briggs Cunningham	(United States) William "Bill" Spear (United States) Sherwood Johnston	Cunningham C-4R	1.205

== Statistics ==
Taken from Quentin Spurring's book, officially licensed by the ACO

- Fastest Lap in practice – Maglioli, #3 Ferrari 375 Plus & Walker, #12 Jaguar D-Type – 4m 18.0s; 188.23 kp/h (116.96 mph)
- Fastest Lap – González, #4 Ferrari 375 Plus & Marzotto, #3 Ferrari 375 Plus – 4m 16.8s; 189.14 kp/h (117.53 mph)
- Fastest Car in Speedtrap – Moss, #12 Jaguar D-Type – 278.15 kp/h (172.84 mph)
- Distance – 4061.15 km (2523.56 miles)
- Winner's Average Speed – 169.22 km/h (105.15 mph)
- Attendance – ?

== World championship standings after the race ==
Pos	Championship	Points
1	(Italy) Ferrari	22
2	(Italy) Lancia	14
3	(United Kingdom) Jaguar	9
4	(Italy) Osca	8
5	(Italy) Maserati	5
6=	(United Kingdom) Aston Martin	4
6=	(United Kingdom) Austin-Healey	4
6=	(United States) Cunningham	4
9=	(United Kingdom) Kieft	1
9=	(West Germany) Porsche	1
9=	(France) Gordini	1

Championship points were awarded for the first six places in each race in the order of 8-6-4-3-2-1. Manufacturers were only awarded points for their highest finishing car, with no points awarded for positions filled by additional cars.

== Citations ==
World Sportscar Championship
Previous race: Mille Miglia	1954 season	Next race: RAC Tourist Trophy
