= 1953 12 Hours of Sebring =

Sports car endurance race

Sebring International Raceway in 1952-1966

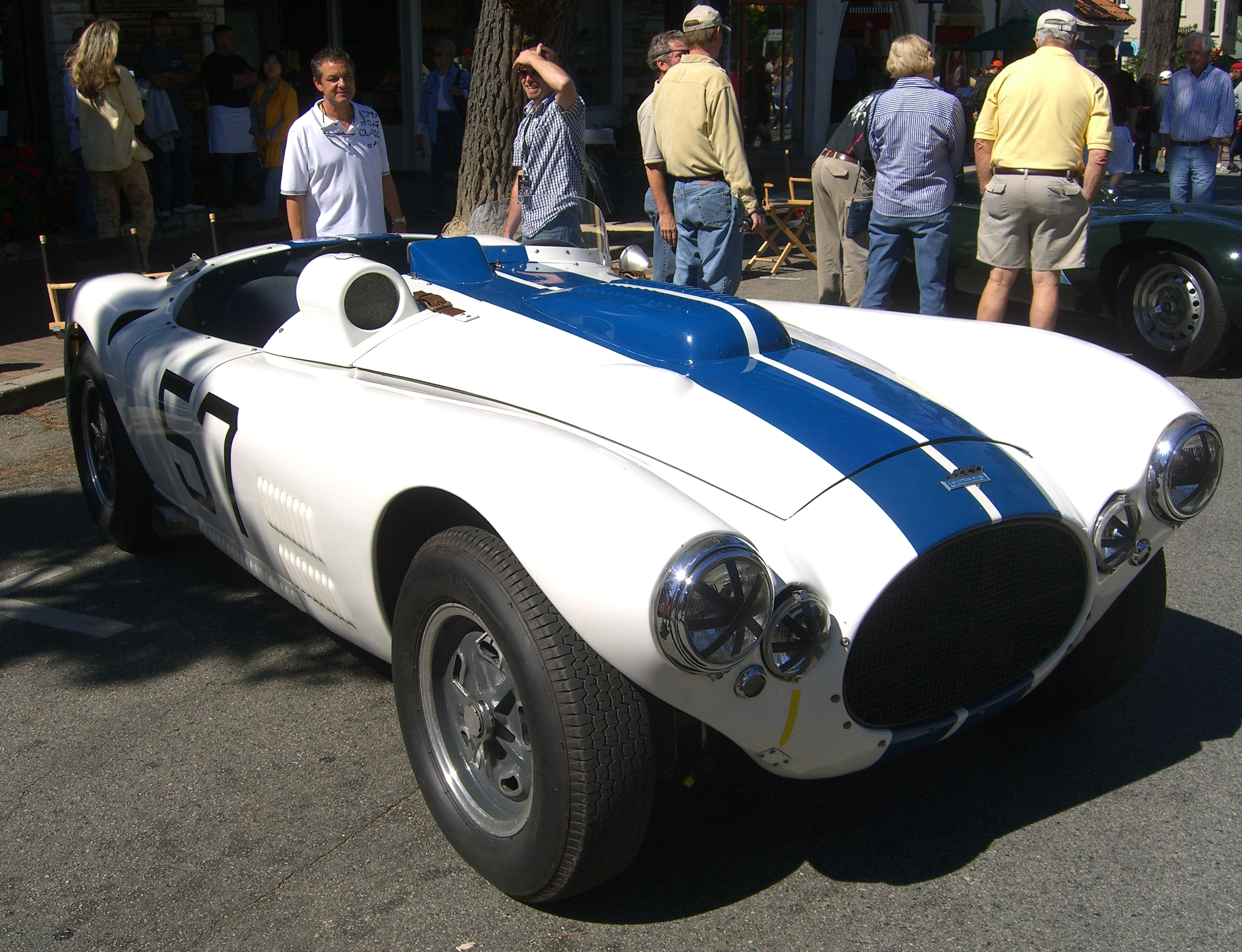
Cunningham C-4R won in the hands of Phil Walters and John Fitch.

The 3rd Grand Prix, 12 Hours of Sebring, was the inaugural round of the 1953 World Sportscar Championship and was held at the Sebring International Raceway, on 8 March 1953.

== Report ==
=== Entry ===
A total of 81 cars were entered for the event, across eight classes based on engine sizes, ranging from up to 750cc to over 8.0 litre. Of these 59 cars practised, 54 qualified to race.

Amongst the mostly American entrants, the greatest news for the 1953 race was that the famous English Aston Martin team would join the French factory DB’s for the 12 Hour competition. In fact, David Brown and René Bonnet, heads of these European manufacturers, both went to Florida to watch the race. Bonnet also took part in the race.

=== Race ===
The race started at noon, and ran until midnight, on a day described as "partly cloudy and mild", in front of an estimated crowd of 12,500 spectators.

The Aston Martins made a great start, leading the first 32 laps of the Florida road course before losing the lead as a result of an accident. The #57 Cunningham C-4R then took over lead and was never headed for the rest of the race.

The car was driven by Phil Walters and John Fitch took the winner spoils for Briggs Cunningham’s team. They were boosted to the lead when the front running Aston Martin of Geoff Duke and Peter Collins collided with a Jaguar, and was forced to retire with accident damage. Walters and Fitch drove their Florida license plated Cunningham C-4R to victory, covering a distance of 908.9 miles, averaging a speed of 75.338mph. One lap adrift in second place was the Aston Martin DB3 of the Reg Parnell and George Abecassis, despite reportedly being hampered by having one of its headlamps not working due to an earlier collision with a bollard filed with concrete marking the circuit on what was at the time largely an airfield.

There was one car fire, the Allard-Cadillac J2X of Paul Ramos was destroyed when a fuel line split, however the driver, Anthony Cumming escaped unharmed. Another competitor, Randy Pearsall, also escaped injury when he flipped his Jaguar XK120.

== Classification ==
=== Sebring 12 hours ===
Class Winners are in Bold text.

Pos.	No.	Class	Drivers		Entrant	Car - Engine	Laps	Reason Out
1st	**57**	**S8.0**	**(United States) Phil Walters**	**(United States) John Fitch**	**Briggs Cunningham**	**Cunningham C-4R-Chrysler**	**173**	
2nd	**30**	**S3.0**	**(United Kingdom) Reg Parnell**	**(United Kingdom) George Abecassis**	**Aston Martin Ltd.**	**Aston Martin DB3**	**172**	
3rd	**74**	**S5.0**	**(United States) Sherwood Johnston**	**(United States) Bob Wilder**	**A. H. Feverbacher**	**Jaguar C-Type**	**162**	
4th	311	S5.0	(United States) Bob Gegen	(United States) Harry Grey	David Hirsch	Jaguar C-Type	155	
5th	**59**	**S1.5**	**(United States) Briggs Cunningham**	**(United States) Bill Lloyd**	**Briggs Cunningham**	**Osca MT4 1350**	**153**	
6th	**49**	**S2.0**	**(United States) Ed Lunken**	**(United States) Charles Hassan**	**E. P. Lunken**	**Ferrari 166 MM**	**153**	
7th	38	S5.0	(United States) Charles Wallace	(United States) Chuck Sarle	Jack Pry Ltd.	Jaguar XK120	151	
8th	45	S3.0	(United States) Peter Yung	(United States) Robert Yung	Peter S. Yung	Ferrari 225 S	148	
9th	**91**	**S1.1**	**(United States) James Simpson**	**(United States) George Colby**	**James Simpson**	**Osca MT4 1100**	146	
10th	28	S5.0	(United States) Russ Boss	(United States) Jake Kaplan	J. Kaplan	Jaguar XK120M	144	
11th	**25**	**S750**	**(France) René Bonnet**	**(United States) Wade Morehouse**	**Hobart Cook**	**DB HBR Panhard**	**143**	
12th	18	S5.0	(United States) Walt Hansgen	(United States) Don McKnought	Walter Hansgen	Jaguar XK120	142	
13th	12	S1.5	(United States) David Ash	(United States) Frank Ahrens	David H. Ash	MG Special	135	
14th	53	S1.5	(Canada) Phil Smyth	(United States) Bob Said	Lt. Col. Wojdiech Kolaczkowski	Frazer Nash Mille Miglia	134	
15th	53	S1.5	(United States) James Shields	(United States) Bob McKinsey	James Shields	MG TD	132	
16th	42	S1.5	(United States) William Wellenberg, Jnr.	(United States) William Wonder	William Wellenberg, Jnr.	MG TD	132	
17th	29	S5.0	(United States) Fred Dagavar	(United States) Al Garz	Fred Dagavar	Jaguar XK120	132	
18th	63	S750	(United States) Harry Beck	(United States) Charles Devaney	Paul Hessler	Siata-Crossley 300BD	132	
DSQ	24	S750	(United States) Bill Cook	(France) André Moynet	Hobart Cook	DB HBR Panhard	130	Pit violation
19th	44	S1.5	(United States) Fred Allen	(United States) Robert Longworth	Fred Allen	MG Special	127	
20th	56	S750	(United States) Thomas Scatchard	(United States) Henry Wessells	Thomas Scatchard	Siata-Crossley 300BD	127	
21st	27	S1.1	(United States) Paul Farago	(United States) Lou Torco	Robert T. Keller	Siata 300BC Special	123	
22nd	111	S750	(United States) George Sachrafft	(United States) Jim Hamlett	Geo. F. Schrafft	Palm Beach-Crossley Special	119	
23rd	55	S3.0	(United States) Mike Rothschild	(United States) Jack Nile	Mike Rothschild	Morgan Plus 4	119	
24th	32	S8.0	(United States) Arnold Stubbs	(United States) Jack McAfee	Jack Burkhard	Allard-Cadillac J2	116	
25th	6	S1.5	(United States) Rees Makins	(United States) Frank Bott	Rees T. Makins	Osca MT4 1100	115	
26th	15	S5.0	(United States) George Huntoon	(United States) Phil Stiles	Jack Shepperd	Jaguar C-Type	114	
27th	64	S2.0	(Argentina) Walter von Schoenfeld	(Argentina) René Soulas	Walter E. von Schoenfeld	Maserati A6GCS	110	
28th	14	S1.5	(United States) Alan Patterson	(United States) Hubert L. Brundage	Alan Patterson	MG Special	99	
29th	16	S5.0	(United States) Morris Carroll	(United States) Randy Pearsall	Geo. E. Tilp	Jaguar XK120	94	
30th	51	S5.0	(United States) Walt Grey	(United States) Dale Duncan	Walter S. Grey	Allard-Cadillac J2	94	
31st	37	S1.1	(United States) Roger Wing	(United States) Stephen Spitler	Jack Pry, Ltd.	Morris Minor	93	
32nd	11	S1.1	(United States) Paul Ceresole	(United States) Logan Hill	Paul Ceresole	Cisitalia Spider	88	
33rd	2	S3.0	(United States) Hal Ullrich	(United States) Dick Irish	Brooks Stevens	Excalibur-Willys J	86	
34th	23	S5.0	(United States) Charles Schott	(United States) John van Driel	Charles M. Schott	Jaguar XK120	63	
DNF	5	S3.0	(United States) Jim Kimberly	(United States) Marshall Lewis	Jim Kimberly	Ferrari 225 S	95	Transmission
DNF	60	S1.5	(United States) Dickson Yates	(United States) William Kinchloe	Dickson Yates	MG TD		Engine
DNF	80	S1.5	(United States) Richard Toland	(United States) Howard Hanna	Richard Toland	Porsche 356		did not finish
DNF	61	S2.0	(United States) Ray Leibensperger	(United States) Howard Class	Ray Leibensperger	MG Special	78	did not finish
DNF	39	S750	(United States) William Eagar	(United States) Otto Linton	Speedcraft Enterprises	Siata Amica Special	63	Engine
DNF	8	S3.0	(United States) Bill Spear	(United States) Phil Hill	William Spear	Ferrari 225 S	56	Differential
DNF	19	S5.0	(United States) Norman Christianson	(United States) Austin Conley	Austin L. Conley	Jaguar XK120	56	Accident
DNF	31	S3.0	(United Kingdom) Peter Collins	(United Kingdom) Geoff Duke	Aston Martin Ltd.	Aston Martin DB3	52	Accident damage
DNF	98	S8.0	(United States) Erwin Goldschmist	(United States) Paul O'Shea	Erwin Goldschmidt	Healey Silverstone-Cadillac	45	Rear end
DNF	33	S1.5	(France) Bernard Cahier	(United States) Miles Collier	René Bonnet	DB HBR Panhard	37	Brakes
DNF	58	S2.0	(United States) John Gordon Bennett	(United States) Charles Moran	Briggs Cunningham	Frazer Nash Targa Florio	28	Unknown
DNF	26	S750	(United States) Ralph Deshon	(United States) Don Quackenbush	Ralph Deshon	Crosley Special	25	Suspension
DNF	66	S5.0	(United States) Tony Cumming	(United States) Paul Ramos	Paul Ramos	Allard-Cadillac J2X	20	Fire
DNF	36	S8.0	(United States) Masten Gregory	(United States) Tony Newcomer	Masten Gregory	Allard-Chrysler J2X	16	Transmission
DISQ	48	S2.0	(Argentina) Jorge Daponte	(United States) Fritz Koster	Fritz Koster	Maserati A6GCS	15	pit rule violation
DNF	97	S8.0	(United States) Beau Clarke	(United States) Bob Said	Mark B. Deitsch	Allard-Cadillac J2	9	Engine
DNF	3	S3.0	(United States) Ralph Knudsen	(United States) Jim Feld	Brooks Stevens	Excalibur-Willys J	4	Engine
DNF	1	S2.0	(United States) Tony Bonadies	(United States) George Rice	Stuart Donaldson	Frazer Nash Le Mans Replica Mk II	2	Engine
DNF	9	S2.0	(United States) Johnnie Rogers	(United States) Russ Klar	Stuart Donaldson	Frazer Nash Le Mans Replica Mk II	2	Engine
DNS	17	S750	(United States) George Sanderson	(United States) N. J. Coscoros	Geo. Sanderson	Crosley Hotshot		Engine
DNS	21	S1.5	(United States) Larry Kulok	(United States) Harry Grey	Lawrence Kulok	Porsche 356 1500 Super		Gearbox
DNS	41	S1.1	(United States) Randy Pearsall	(United States) William Eager	F. Randolph Pearsall	Cisitalia Spider		Engine
DNS	65	S5.00	(United States) Tom Cole	(United States) Bill Lloyd	William Lloyd	Ferrari 340 America		Engine
DNS	75	S5.00	(United States) Miles Collier	(United States) Cameron Argetsinger	Cameron Argetsinger	Jaguar XK120		Engine

- Fastest lap: John Fitch, 120.540 mph

=== Class Winners ===
Class	Winners	
Class B – Sports 8000	Walters / Fitch	Cunningham C-4R
Class C – Sports 5000	Johnston / Wilder	Jaguar C-type
Class D – Sports 3000	Parnell / Abecassis	Aston Martin DB3
Class E – Sports 2000	Lunken / Hassan	Ferrari 166 MM
Class F – Sports 1500	Cunningham / Lloyd	Osca MT4 1350
Class G – Sports 1100	Simpson / Colby	Osca MT4 1100
Class H – Sports 750	Bonnet / Morehouse	DB HBR Panhard

== Standings after the race ==
Pos	Championship	Points
1	(United States) Cunningham	8
2	(United Kingdom) Aston Martin	6
3	(United Kingdom) Jaguar	4
4	(Italy) Osca	2
5	(Italy) Ferrari	1

- Note: Only the top five positions are included in this set of standings.
Championship points were awarded for the first six places in each race in the order of 8-6-4-3-2-1. Manufacturers were only awarded points for their highest finishing car with no points awarded for positions filled by additional cars. Only the best 4 results out of the 7 races could be retained by each manufacturer. Points earned but not counted towards the championship totals are listed within brackets in the above table.

World Sportscar Championship
Previous race: n/a	1953 season	Next race: Mille Miglia
