= Carlos Braniff =

Mexican sailor

Carlos Braniff (born 12 January 1928) is a Mexican former sailor who competed in the 1960, 1964, and 1968 Summer Olympics. He was born in Mexico City.
