= Bill Lloyd (racing driver) =

American amateur racing driver (1923–2011)

- Born: William Bedford Lloyd; July 12, 1923 New York
- Died: 28 November 2011 (aged 88) Southport, Connecticut

William Bedford "Bill" Lloyd (12 July 1923 – 28 November 2011) was an American amateur racing driver, who won the 12 Hours of Sebring in 1954 with Stirling Moss driving an OSCA MT4.

== Career ==
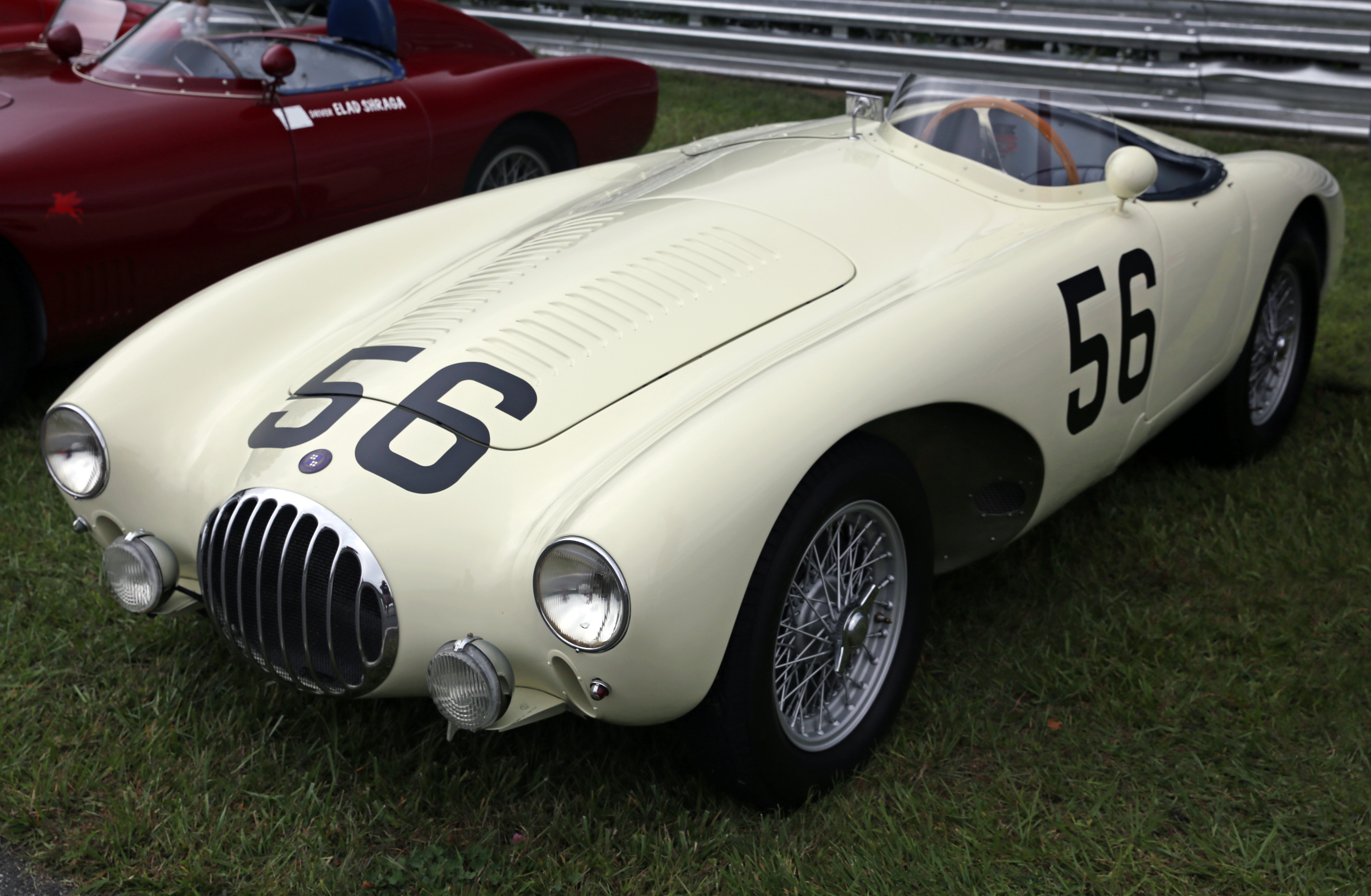
The 1.5l OSCA MT4 in which Lloyd and Moss won the 1954 Sebring 12 Hours.

The Connecticut-based Lloyd was the nephew of sportscar entrant Briggs Cunningham and raced sportscars from 1950 to 1958. He drove the OSCA MT4 with Cunningham in the first international 12 Hours of Sebring in 1953, the duo finishing 5th and winning the 1.5 litre class. For 1954, Cunningham invited over the rising star Stirling Moss, who accepted the drive in order to have a holiday in the United States, to share the little OSCA with Lloyd. The race suffered unexpectedly high rates of attrition, with Aston Martin losing all of its factory cars and Lancia eventually only having one car remaining - that being driven by playboy Porfirio Rubirosa and engineer Gino Valenzano - and Moss/Lloyd scored an unlikely victory, dealing with the fading of the OSCA's Fren-Do drum brakes by using four wheel drifts.

Lloyd's racing career was spent almost entirely in the United States, with his only ventures overseas being to the Bahamas Speed Weeks; even then, in 1956, having qualified for the Nassau Trophy, he gave up his Maserati 300S to Stirling Moss, whose works Maserati had been sold. Moss duly won.

Lloyd was twice a Class D champion in the Sports Car Club of America series, in 1954 and 1956, driving a Ferrari 225 and the Maserati 300S respectively. He sold the Maserati (chassis 3051) at the end of 1956, which more or less marked the end of his career, although he drove occasionally afterwards, and his last race was the 1958 12 Hours of Sebring, his Ferrari 500 TRC retiring.

== Personal life ==
Lloyd was an alumnus of the Greenwich Country Day School and Amherst College. He joined the British Army at the start of the Second World War, before transferring to the U.S. 7th Army when his home country became a warring party. In later life he was a keen environmentalist, and supported many wildlife projects in Zambia. He died at home in 2011.

== External sites ==
- Results
