= B. S. Cunningham Company =

Defunct American motor vehicle manufacturer

- Industry: Automobiles
- Founder: Briggs Cunningham
- Headquarters: West Palm Beach, Florida
- Key people: Phil Walters; Bill Frick; G. Briggs Weaver; Bob Blake

The B. S. Cunningham Company was an American automobile company established by Briggs Cunningham. It produced six different models in very small numbers, primarily to be raced at the 24 Hours of Le Mans.

== History ==
In 1949 Briggs Cunningham met Phil Walters, who raced Midgets and Stock cars under the nom de course "Ted Tappet". Walters began driving for Cunningham, taking the wheel of the latter's Cadillac-powered Healey Silverstone the following year. Walters was also a partner with Bill Frick in Frick-Tappet Motors, which had started out as a Volkswagen and Porsche dealership but had begun building auto conversions called "Fordillacs" by installing new Cadillac V8 engines into 1949 Ford chassis.

Cunningham bought a Fordillac after seeing one at a hill-climb, planning to enter it in the 1950 24 Hours of Le Mans. The Fordillac was rejected by the Le Mans organizers due to its engine swap, so instead Cunningham entered two cars based on the Cadillac Series 61.

The first was dubbed "Petit Pataud" by the French in a possible reference to a puppy in a French children's book from the 1930s. This car's appearance was essentially stock, with changes that included a dual-carburetor intake manifold, brake cooling ducts, a second fuel tank, and extra lights.

While engine swaps were illegal, body modifications were permitted, so the second car had its stock body removed and a new aluminum body fabricated over a metal tube framework. The custom body, lower and narrower than stock, was designed and built with the help of engineer Howard Weinmann from Grumman. Another feature was the use of five carburetors. This car was named "Le Monstre".

Designer and bodywork specialist Bob Blake was hurriedly brought in to repair "Petit Pataud" when it was damaged in a pre-race shunt with "Le Monstre". Blake later joined B. S. Cunningham and remained responsible for building the cars until 1955.

Brothers Cowles "Miles" Collier and Sam Collier partnered to drive "Petit Pataud", and finished in tenth place. Cunningham and co-driver Walters were in "Le Monstre", and finished one place behind the other Cadillac in eleventh place.

In preparation for his next attempt at Le Mans, Cunningham bought the Frick-Tappett Motors company. The operation was moved from Long Island, New York to West Palm Beach, Florida, and renamed the "B. S. Cunningham Company".

After fielding cars at Circuit de la Sarthe from 1951 to 1955, several of the Cunningham racing team retired following the 1955 Le Mans disaster. 1955 also marked the end of the grace period the American Internal Revenue Service allowed for a company to become profitable. With few cars having been built and no profits to show, the IRS reclassified the B. S. Cunningham Company as a hobby, meaning that the racing and production expenses were no longer tax deductible. Briggs Cunningham wound up the operation and sold the West Palm Beach factory. An attempt at reviving the company was made in 2001 under Bob Lutz and Briggs Cunningham III (son of the company founder), although production did not commence.

== Car models ==
=== C-1 ===
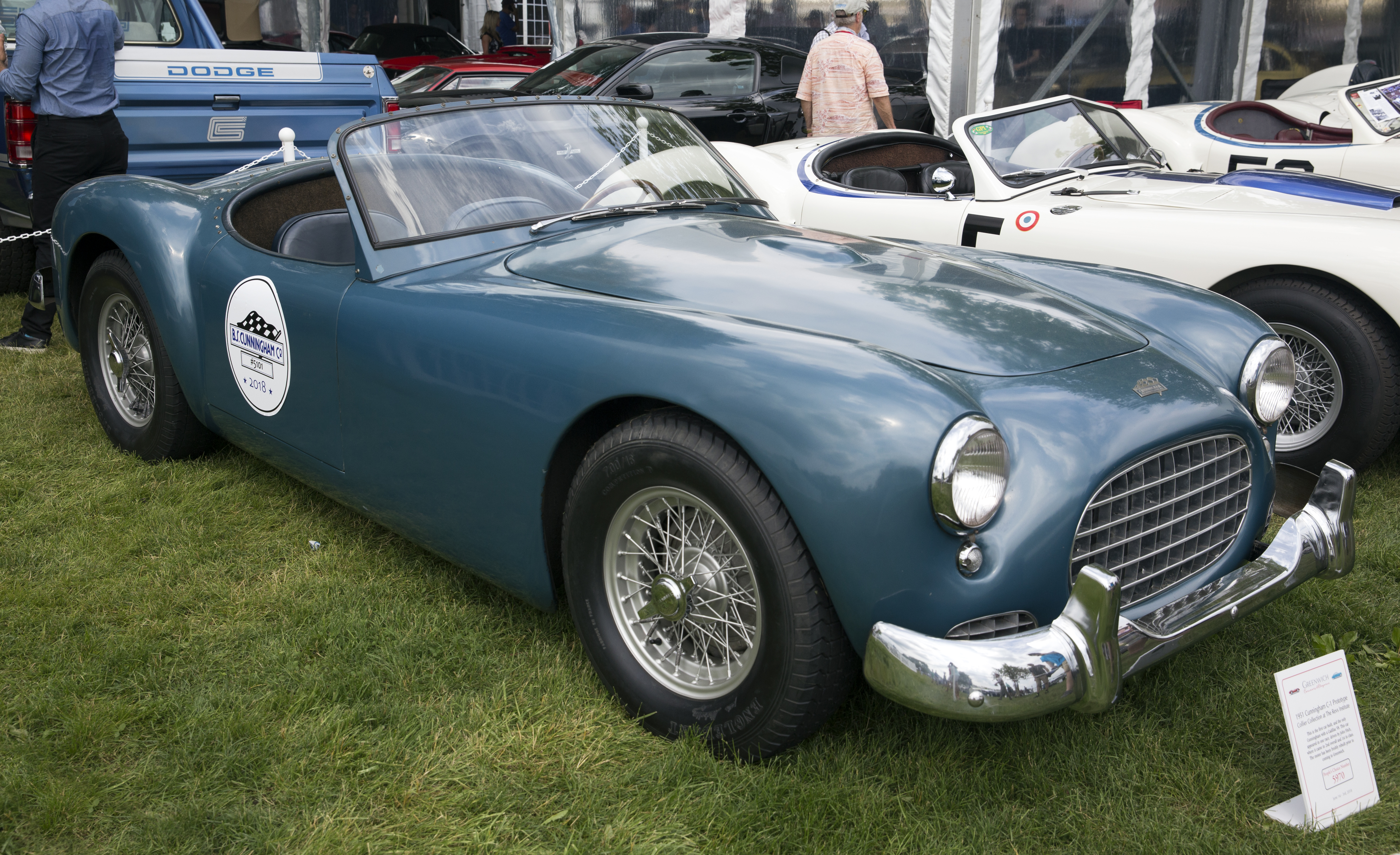
Cunningham C-1

The first product of the new company was the Cunningham C-1 roadster. On the design team were Cunningham, Walters, G. Briggs Weaver and Blake. Only one C-1 was built, with serial number 5101. The car was completed in late 1950, and is generally listed as from the 1951 model year.

The chassis was made of 3 in (76 mm) steel tubing with a central X-brace. The rear suspension was a custom-made De Dion tube. The tires were mounted on knock-off wire wheels. Wheelbase was 105 in (2,667 mm), and the track front and rear was 58 in (1,473 mm). The engine was a 331 cu in (5,424 cc) Cadillac V8.

The C-1 was used in practice at Le Mans, but did not race. In 1951 it appeared at the Mount Equinox hillclimb, where it finished fourth driven by John Fitch.

=== C-2R ===
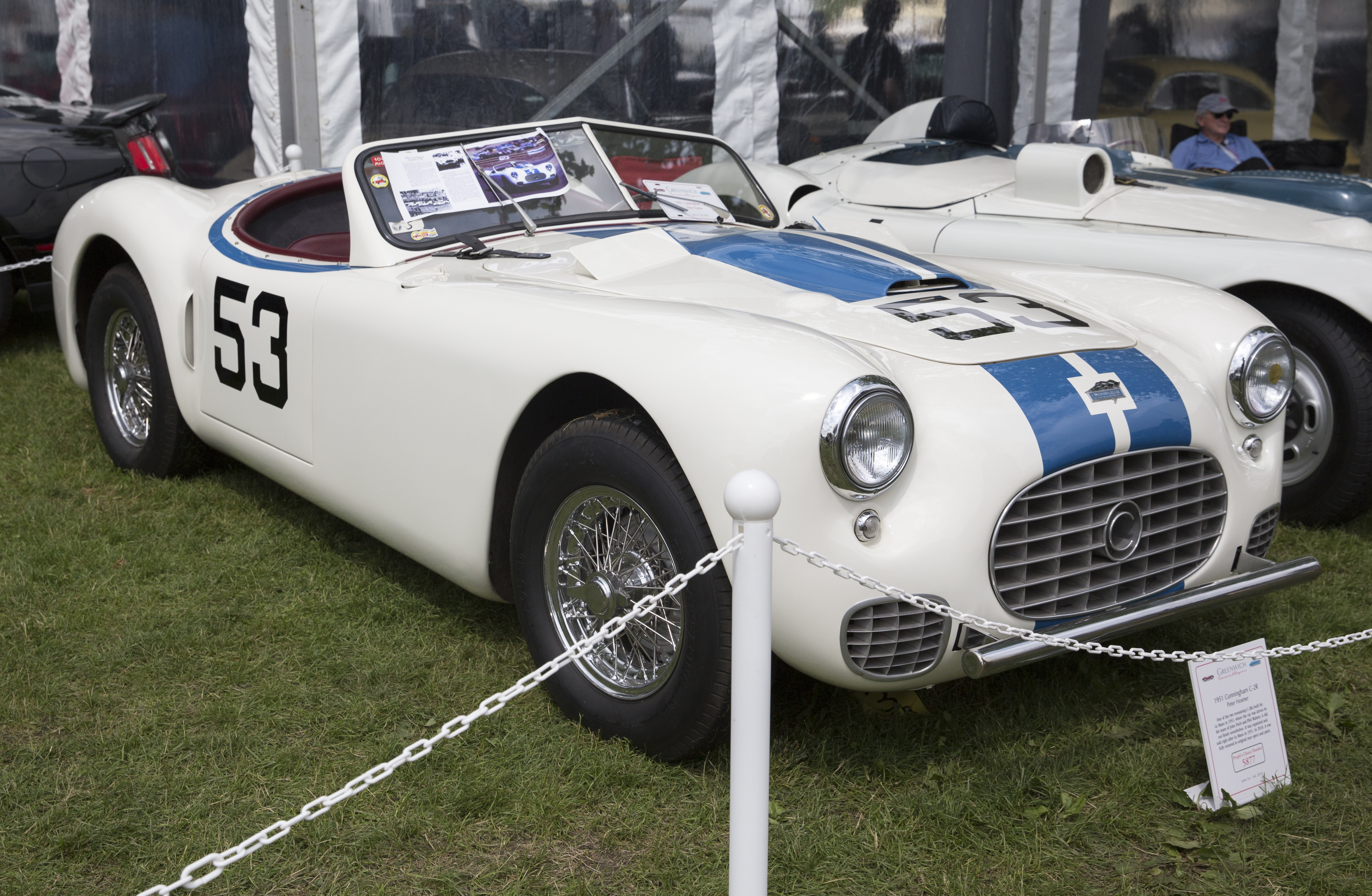
Cunningham C-2R

The C-1 was followed by the C-2, of which three were built, all to racing specifications and so called C-2R. The C-2R's front suspension used Ford parts, while the rear suspension had Oldsmobile springs and the brake system used Cadillac components. Unable to secure a supply of the Cadillac engine, Cunningham substituted a version of the Chrysler FirePower V8 in the C-2R.

The C-2R debuted at Le Mans in 1951. All three cars were entered, driven by teams John Fitch and Phil Walters, George Rand and Fred Wacker Jr., and Briggs Cunningham and George Huntoon. The best finish was eighteenth, for the Fitch/Walters car.

=== C-3 ===
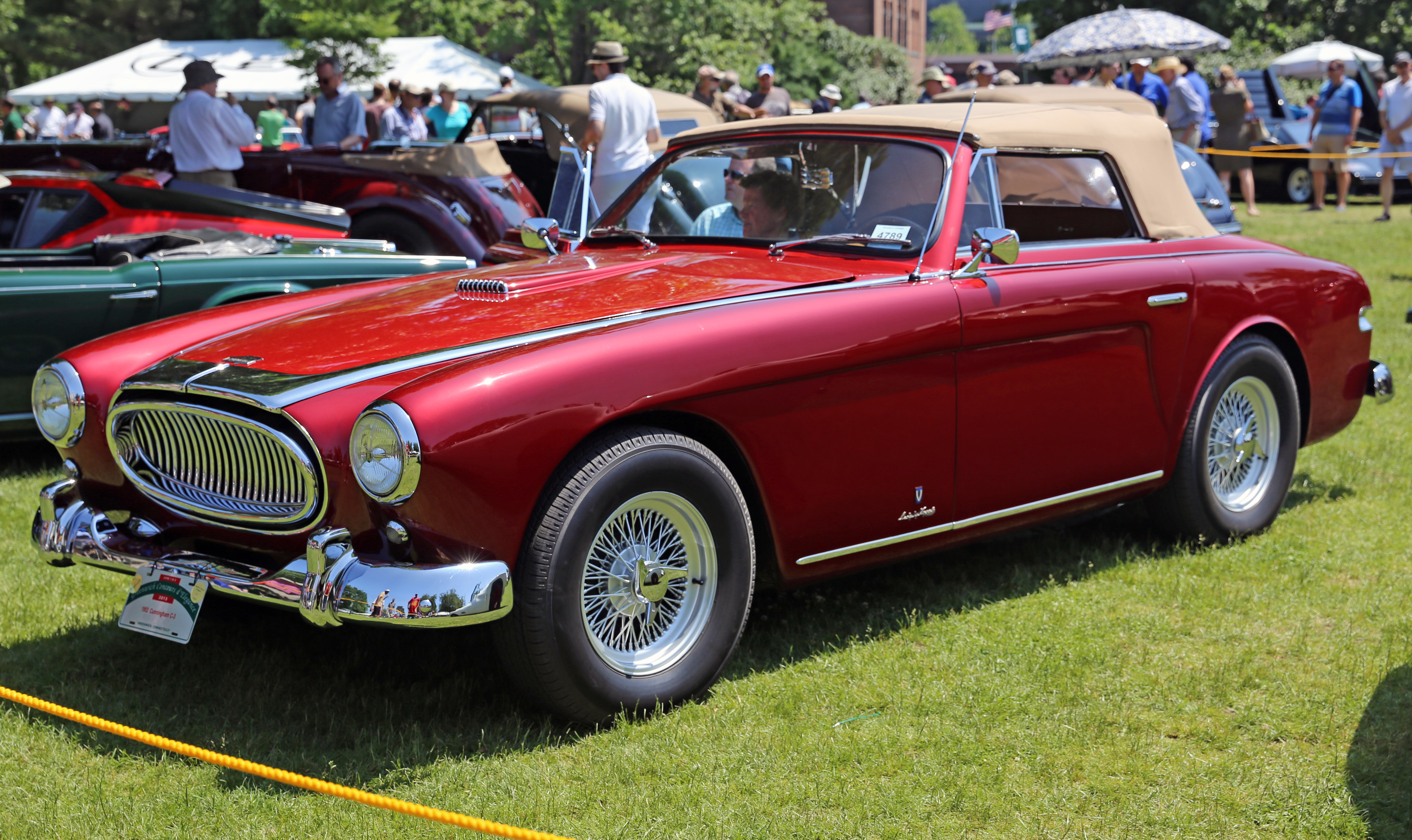
1953 Cunningham C-3 Cabriolet

To have his namesake cars homologated as a manufacturer for Le Mans, Cunningham undertook to build 25 examples of the C-3 road car.

The C-3 also used the 331 cu in (5,424 cc) Chrysler FirePower V8, but with a new intake manifold with four Zenith 1-bbl carburetors, and a dual exhaust system. Power was raised to 220 hp (164.1 kW) from the factory version's 180 hp (134.2 kW).

Two different transmissions were offered; a three-speed manual from Cadillac, or Chrysler's Presto-Matic semi-automatic fluid-coupled two-speed with electric overdrive, for an effective selection of four forward ratios.

The C-3's large-diameter tube chassis was similar to that of the earlier C-2, but the C-2's De Dion tube gave way to a coil-spring live axle located by upper and lower trailing arms on each side.

Two pre-production cars similar in appearance to the C-2Rs were completed in West Palm Beach; a roadster with chassis number 5205, and a coupe with chassis number 5206X. A third chassis, number 5206, was sent to the workshops of carrozzeria Vignale in Turin, Italy, where it received a new coupe body styled by designer Giovanni Michelotti, then working at Vignale. The factory considered chassis 5206 the official prototype, and subsequent cars received the Michelotti body style.

Twenty-seven C3s were built. One reference reports eighteen coupes and nine convertibles. Others report twenty coupes and five convertibles with bodies by Vignale, plus the two cars bodied at the West Palm Beach factory. Initially priced at US$9,000 ($111,635 in 2025 dollars), the cost of a C-3 rose to US$15,000 ($186,058 in 2025 dollars) by 1951.

The New York Museum of Modern Art named the C-3 Continental Coupé one of the "10 Best Contemporary Automobiles".

=== C-4R and C-4RK ===
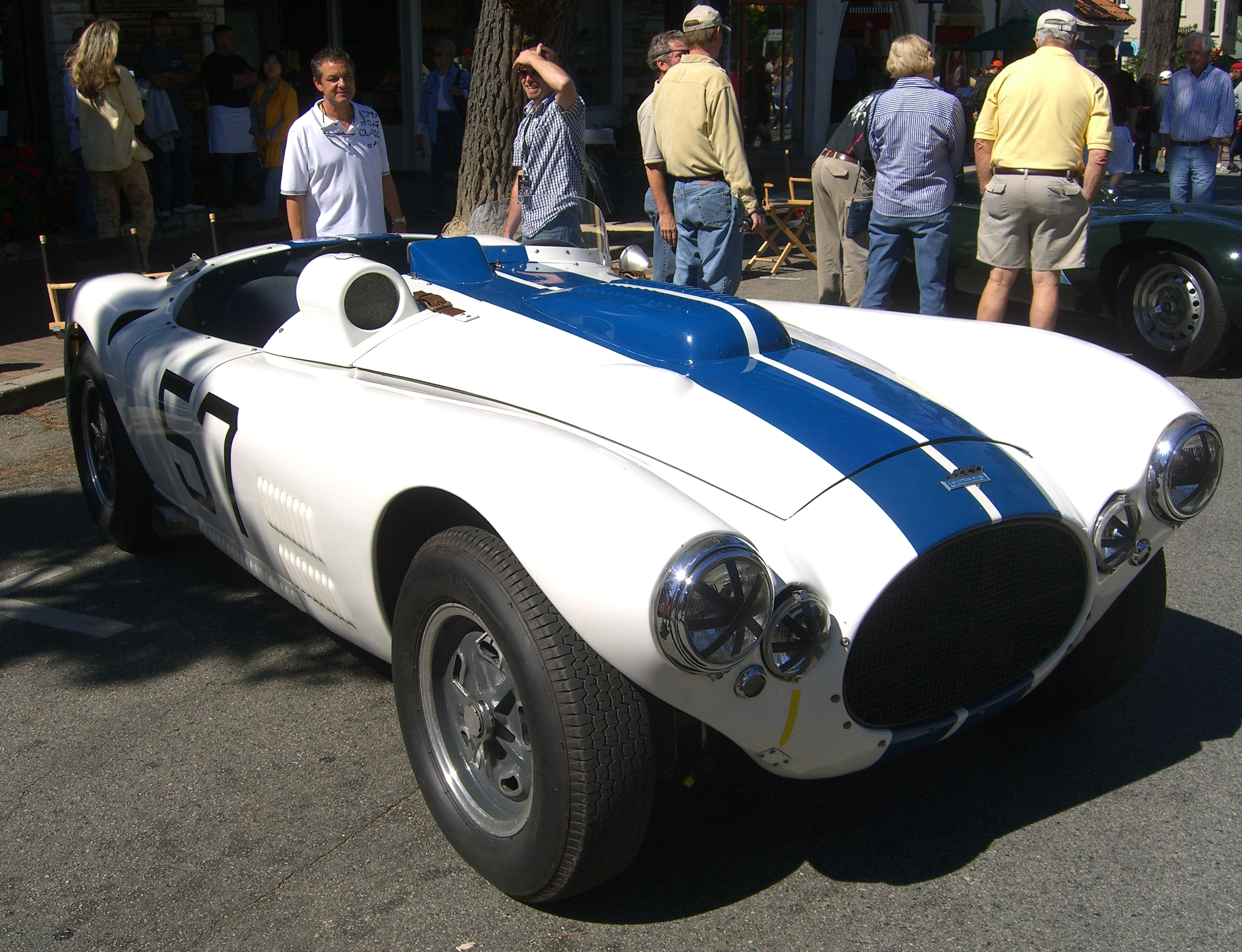
Cunningham C-4R

By the time development of the C-4R started, Bill Frick had left the company. The new car was designed by Weaver. During the car's development the team was also joined by mechanic and bodyman Herbert "Bud" Unger, who did the bodywork for the C-4R and C-5R. The C-4R was 16 in (406 mm) shorter, 4 in (102 mm) narrower, and 900 lb (408.2 kg) lighter than the C-2R. The De Dion tube rear suspension was also gone. Although a new independent rear suspension of Cunningham's own design was touted early in the car's development, it seems that later a live axle on coil springs was substituted. Also new was a Cunningham-designed 5-speed manual transmission. Brakes were Chrysler Al-Fin units twenty percent larger than those on the C-2Rs, and the earlier car's wire wheels had been replaced with knock-off Halibrand magnesium wheels.

To provide Cunningham's cars with more power from their FirePower engine, Chrysler engineers John Platner and Don Moore began an engine development project called A311. In its ultimate form the A311 engine used a gear-driven, high-lift long-duration camshaft, special pistons, roller tappets, dual valve springs, special pushrods, Hilborn fuel injection with tuned intake stacks, and a compression ratio of 12:1. Output was estimated to have been 300 hp (223.7 kW), high enough to flex the block and require a stiffening plate between the bottom of the block and the sump. Cunningham used a carbureted version of the engine, and had to reduce the compression ratio to 7.5:1 to accommodate the fuel available to the teams at Le Mans.

Two C-4R roadsters were built, as well as a single coupe with truncated bodywork designed in collaboration with German aerodynamicist Wunibald Kamm that was designated the C-4RK.

During practice at the 1952 24 Hours of Le Mans the new transmissions caused problems, and were replaced with 3-speeds. In the end the C-4R of Briggs Cunningham and Bill Spear finished fourth overall. At the 1953 24 Hours of Le Mans a C-4R roadster finished seventh, and the C-4RK coupe tenth. The C-4Rs returned to La Sarthe in 1954 to take third and fifth.

A C-4R won the 1953 12 Hours of Sebring.

In 1954, a C-4R driven by Briggs Cunningham and Sherwood Johnston finished sixth in the 12 Hours of Reims.

=== C-5R ===
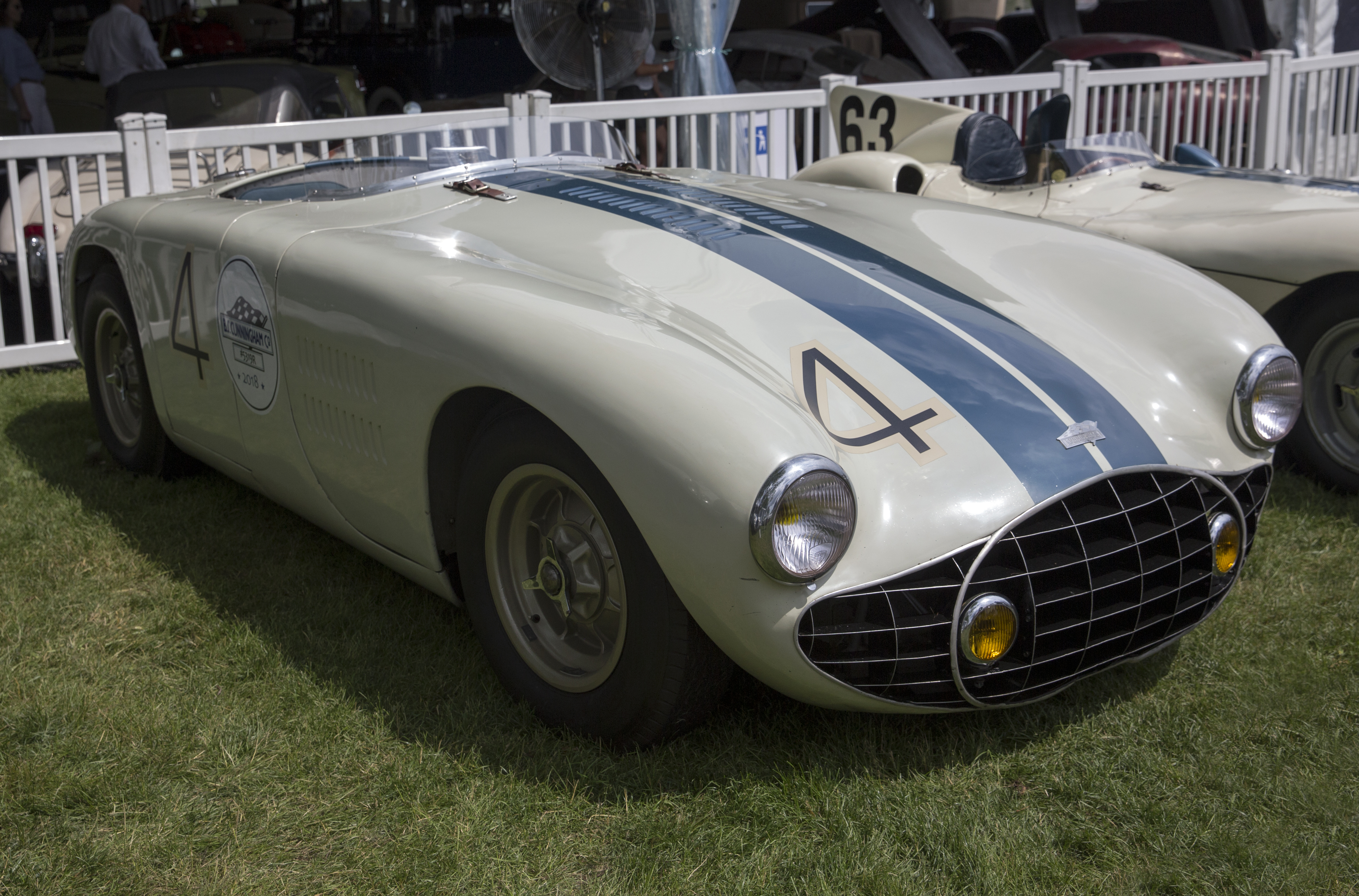
Cunningham C-5R

A single all-new C-5R was prepared for the 1953 24 Hours of Le Mans. The front suspension comprised a solid beam axle sprung by torsion bars. This reduced weight by 30 lb (13.6 kg) and allowed the use of 17 in (432 mm) diameter Al-Fin drum brakes mounted inboard of the 16 in (406 mm) wheels. At the rear was a live axle on coil springs as on the later C-4Rs.

The engine remained the Chrysler V8, but power had been increased by 10 hp (7.5 kW). A 4-speed transmission from a Fiat truck replaced the earlier 3-speed units.

When the car arrived at Le Mans for the race the French observers named it "Le Requin Souriant" — the smiling shark.

At the end of the 24 Hours Walters and Fitch finished first in class and third overall.

=== C-6R ===
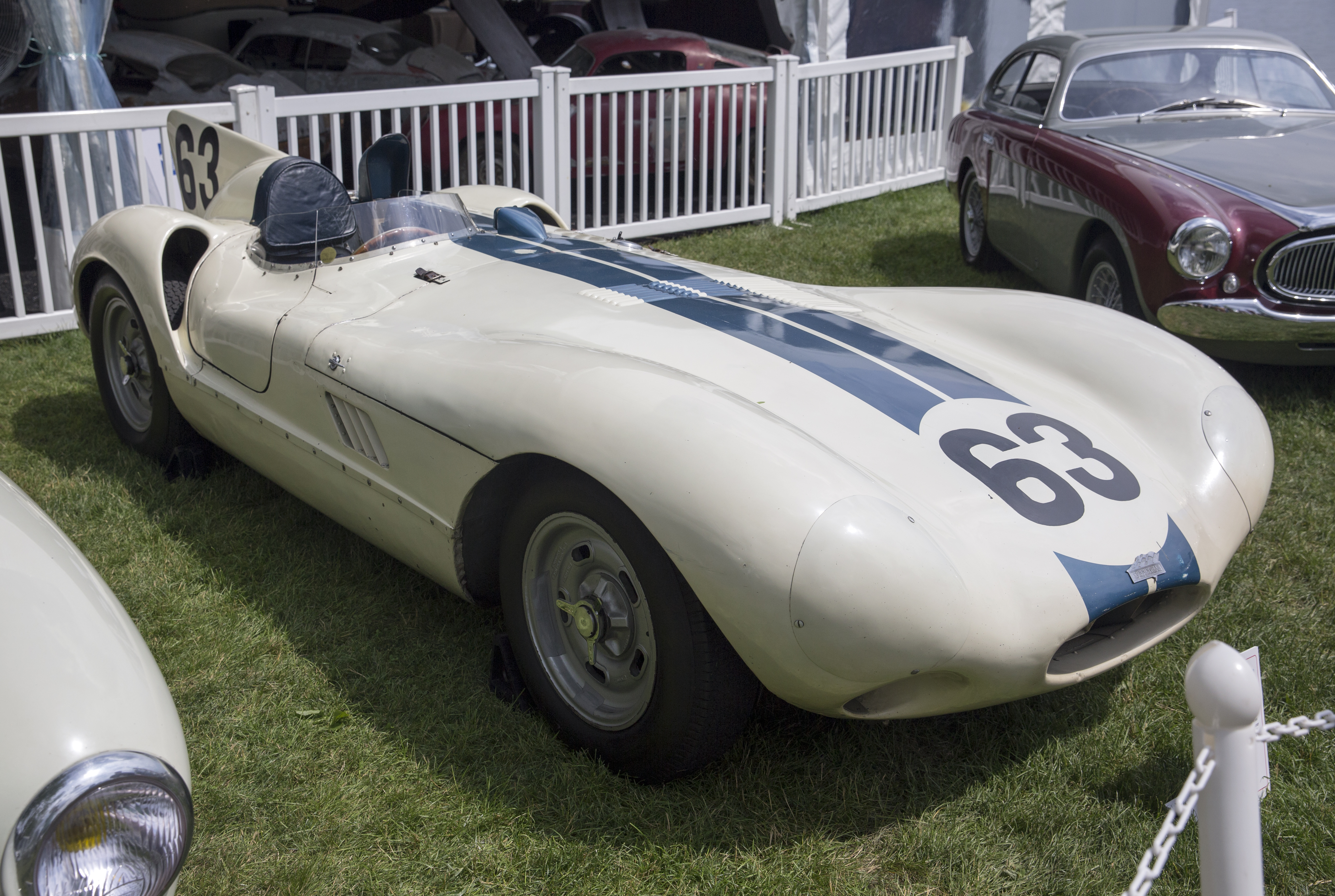
Cunningham C-6R

Primary responsibility for the chassis and body design of the C-6R fell to Unger. Engines considered for the car included a two-stroke inverted V-12 designed by Mercury Marine's Carl Kiekhaefer, and the Ferrari V-12 from the Italian marque's 375 MM.

The engine finally chosen was the 179.5 cu in (2,942 cc) four-cylinder Offenhauser from Meyer & Drake. After consulting with Leo Goossen, the engine's designer, Cunningham's team managed to get power output up to 270 hp (201.3 kW).

The transmission in the C-6R was a four-speed manual by ZF.

At the 1955 Le Mans the C-6R retired on lap 202. Second and third gears had failed, and the engine burned a piston, ending the car's run.

The car raced at Elkhart Lake a few months later, where the engine failed again. The Offy was then replaced by a Jaguar inline-six engine.

=== C7 ===
In 2001, former Chrysler chairman Bob Lutz and Briggs Cunningham III (son of company founder Briggs Cunningham II), formed a partnership aiming to revive the company. A new car, the Cunningham C7 was revealed at the 2001 Detroit Motor Show. Designed by Stewart Reed, the car was a grand tourer styled as a modern interpretation of the Cunningham C-4R. The C7 featured a 2+2 seating arrangement and was planned to be equipped with a V12 engine producing 600 horsepower. Despite aspirations of producing 500-600 cars a year, priced at around $250,000, the C7 remained a prototype.

== Model comparison ==
Model	C-1	C-2R	C-3	C-4R	C-5R	C-6R
Production year(s)	1951	1951		1952	1953	1955
Units built	1	3	27	3 (2 roadsters, 1 coupe)	1	1
Engine	Cadillac V8	Chrysler Firepower V8				Offenhauser I4
Bore x stroke	3.8125 in × 3.625 in (97 mm × 92 mm)					3.97 in × 3.63 in (101 mm × 92 mm)
Valvetrain	Single Cam-in-block, pushrods, rocker arms, two overhead valves per cylinder.					Double overhead camshafts, four valves per cylinder.
Displacement	331 cu in (5.4 L)					179.5 cu in (2,942 cc)
Induction	Carter carburetor, four downdraft Zenith carburetors (optional), downdraft Stromberg carburetor (optional)	Four downdraft Zenith carburetors				Two 2-bbl Weber carburetors
Maximum power	180 hp (134.2 kW) at 5200 rpm	270 hp (201.3 kW) at 5500 rpm	310 hp (231.2 kW) at 5200 rpm	325 hp (242.4 kW) at 5200 rpm	310 hp (231.2 kW) at 5200 rpm	270 hp (201.3 kW) at 6000 rpm
Drivetrain layout	Front-engine, rear-wheel-drive layout					
Transmission	3-speed Cadillac manual		3-speed manual; 2-speed Chrysler Presto-Matic automatic with overdrive	5-speed manual		4-speed manual
Clutch	Single dry plate		Single dry plate (manual only)	Single dry plate		
Chassis/Body	Steel tube chassis, aluminum bodywork					
Front suspension	Upper and lower A-arms, coil springs				Solid beam axle, torsion bar springs	Upper and lower A-arms, coil springs
Rear suspension	De Dion tube		Live axle, coil springs	Independent, coil springs (early); Live axle, coil springs (late)	Live axle, coil springs	De Dion tube, coil springs
Brakes F/R	12 in (305 mm) drum/11 in (279 mm) drum	12.75 in (324 mm) drum/12.75 in (324 mm) drum	12 in (305 mm) drum/12 in (305 mm) drum	13 in (330 mm) drum/13 in (330 mm) drum	17 in (432 mm) drum/17 in (432 mm) drum	13 in (330 mm) drum/13 in (330 mm) inboard drum
Steering	Worm and roller					Norton Racing box
Wheels	Knock-off wire wheels, discs optional			Cast magnesium discs		
Tires	7.00"/7.50"x16"			7.00"x16"		
Wheelbase	105 in (2,667 mm)		107 in (2,718 mm)	100 in (2,540 mm)		
Track F/R	58 / 58 in (1,473 / 1,473 mm)			54 / 54 in (1,372 / 1,372 mm)	55 / 55 in (1,397 / 1,397 mm)	52 / 52 in (1,321 / 1,321 mm)
Length	171 in (4.34 m)	194 in (4.93 m)	168 in (4.27 m)	156 in (3.96 m)	164 in (4.17 m)	
Width	70 in (1,778 mm)			64 in (1,626 mm)		
Height (to top of scuttle)	40 in (1,016 mm)		53 in (1,346 mm)	39 in (991 mm)	40 in (1,016 mm)	35 in (889 mm)
Weight	2,800 lb (1,270.1 kg)	3,400 lb (1,542.2 kg)	3,500 lb (1,587.6 kg)	2,410 lb (1,093.2 kg)	2,480 lb (1,124.9 kg)	1,900 lb (861.8 kg)
Fuel capacity	18 imp gal (81.8 L; 21.6 US gal)			50 imp gal (227.3 L; 60.0 US gal)		

== Racing stripes ==
It is claimed that the Cunningham cars were the first to be painted with what are now called racing stripes.

The International colors for American entries of the time were white bodies with blue frame rails. With their enveloping bodywork the Cunningham racers' frame rails were covered, so the obscured blue frame rails were represented by two blue stripes running the length of the cars' bodies. These were originally called Cunningham stripes.

Some point to a 1930s Delahaye 145 as an example of prior art. After winning the Grand Prix du Million prize in 1939, this car had a red and white stripe painted diagonally across the forward part of the blue colored body, completing the French Tricolour.
