= Ferrari 735 LM =

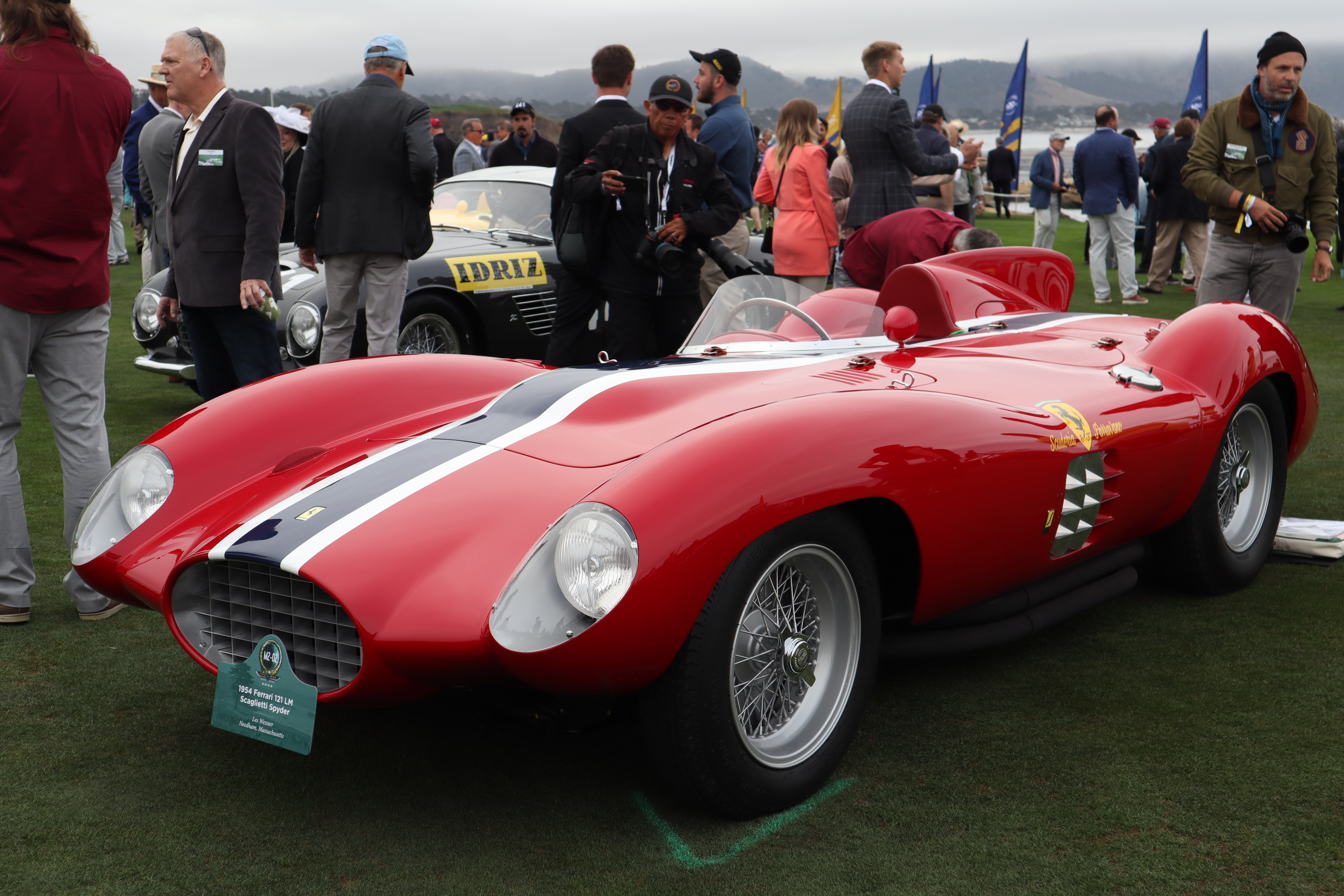

Overview
- Manufacturer: Ferrari
- Also called: Ferrari 121 LM; Ferrari 446 S
- Production: 1955; 4 converted from 376 S
- Designer: Carrozzeria Scaglietti

Body and chassis
- Body style: Spyder
- Layout: Front mid-engine, rear-wheel-drive

Powertrain
- Engine: 4.4 L (4412.49 cc) Tipo 121 Lampredi I6
- Power output: 330 PS
- Transmission: 5-speed manual

Dimensions
- Wheelbase: 2,400 mm (94.5 in)
- Curb weight: 850 kg (1,874 lb) (dry)

Chronology
- Predecessor: Ferrari 376 S
- Successor: Ferrari 625 LM

The Ferrari 735 LM (also known as the 121 LM) was a sports racing car produced by Ferrari in 1955. It was the second raced Ferrari, powered by an Aurelio Lampredi-designed inline-6 engine, created as a larger displacement evolution to the engines used in the Ferrari Monza race cars.

== Development ==
The Ferrari 735 LM was converted from the 376 S sports car that contested the Mille Miglia race for the 1955 season. The first example was converted before Mille Miglia, the rest after the race. Most of the specifications remained the same apart from the engine, which was of larger displacement and higher power output.

The 735 LM was developed to compete in the 1955 24 Hours of Le Mans race that Ferrari had won the previous year with the 375 Plus. With lesser aerodynamics and outdated braking technology compared to the competition, it was designed to outpower the competitors with its new 4.4-litre engine, as Enzo Ferrari firmly believed in engine power to win at racing. In the practice trial for the 24 Hours race, the 735 LM was the fastest.

Unlike its predecessor, the 735 LM name referred to the displacement of one cylinder, as was the naming convention, and the "LM" suffix indicated the intended race – 24 Hours of Le Mans. Inherited chassis numbers also had an "LM" suffix.

The 4.4-litre iteration was also the final capacity step in the inline-six model lineage. After the Le Mans disaster, the new race regulations forced a 2.5-litre cap, so Ferrari returned to the 625-engined Monza models for the 1956 season. Ferrari would also never return to the inline-six configuration and focused instead on a new V6 Dino engine.

== Specifications ==
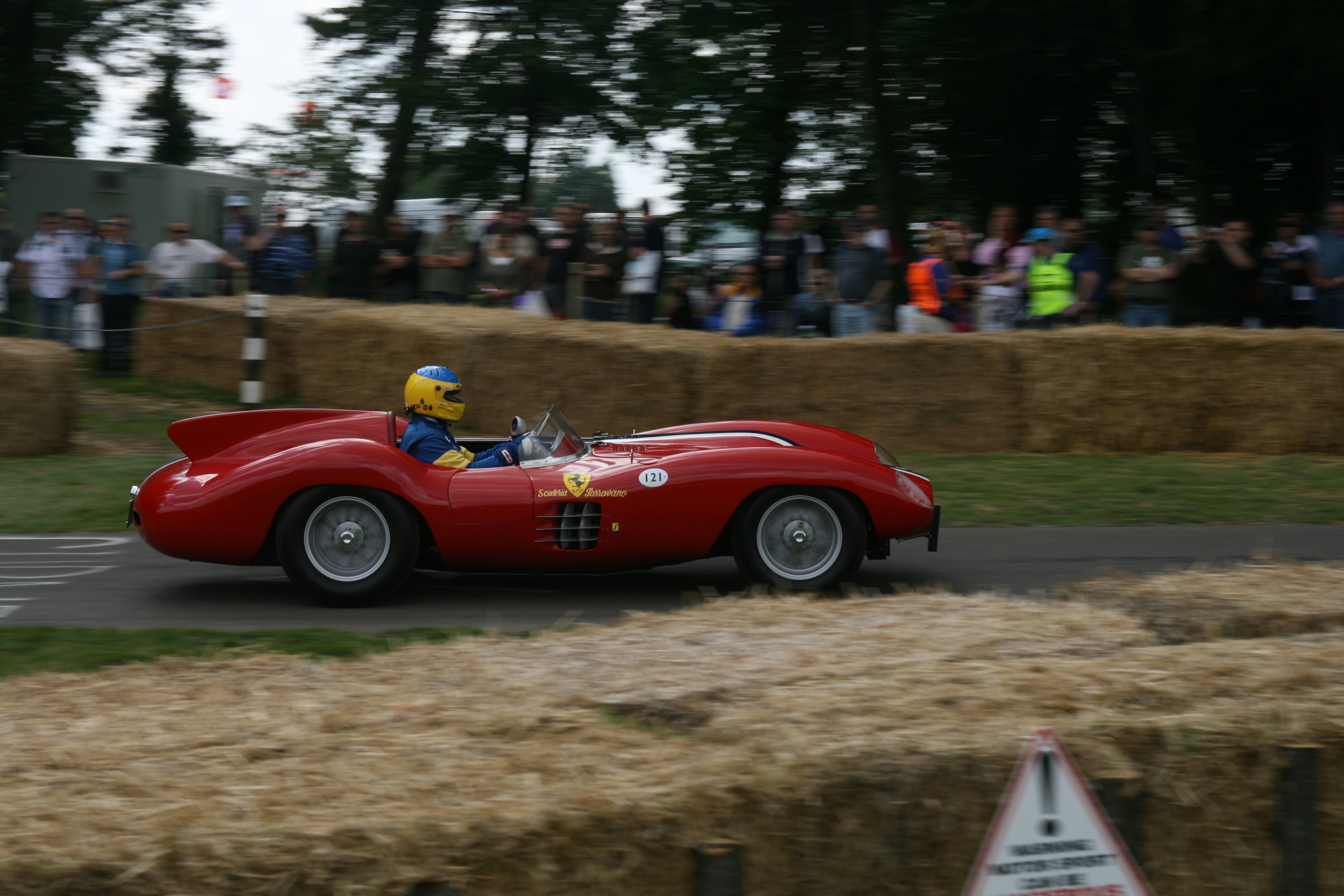
Ferrari 735 LM, chassis 0484LM. Started life as a 306 S, then converted to 376 S.

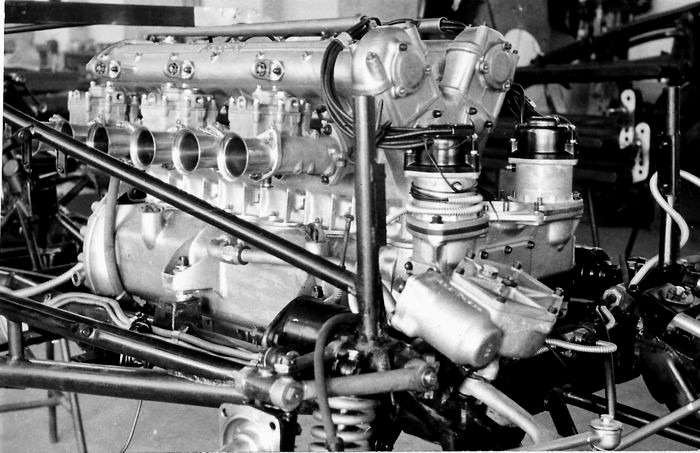
Lampredi 4.4-litre Tipo 121 I6 engine

The enlarged engine was identified as the Tipo 121, hence the common "121 LM" name of the car. The bore and stroke were 102 by 90 mm (4.0 by 3.5 in) (the same as the Ferrari 735 S’ inline-four engine on which they were based) for a displacement of 4,412.49 cc (4.4 L; 269.3 cu in). The power output was 330 PS (243 kW; 325 hp) at 5800 rpm, thanks to three Weber 50DCOA/3 carburettors. Ferrari decided to use smaller diameter carburettors on this model compared to its predecessor. The engine used two spark plugs per cylinder served by two coils, and had a twin overhead camshaft design with two valves per cylinder. It also used a dry sump lubrication system. The compression ratio was at 8.5:1, slightly higher than before.

The tubular steel chassis identified as the Tipo 509 was the same as on the 376 S predecessor. The car weighed 850 kg (1,874 lb) when unladen. The fuel tank had a capacity of 150 litres.

The front suspension was independent with unequal-length wishbones, with coil springs and hydraulic shock absorbers. Suspension at the rear consisted of a De Dion axle with twin arms and a transverse leaf spring with hydraulic shock absorbers. The car continued to use drum brakes.

== Racing ==
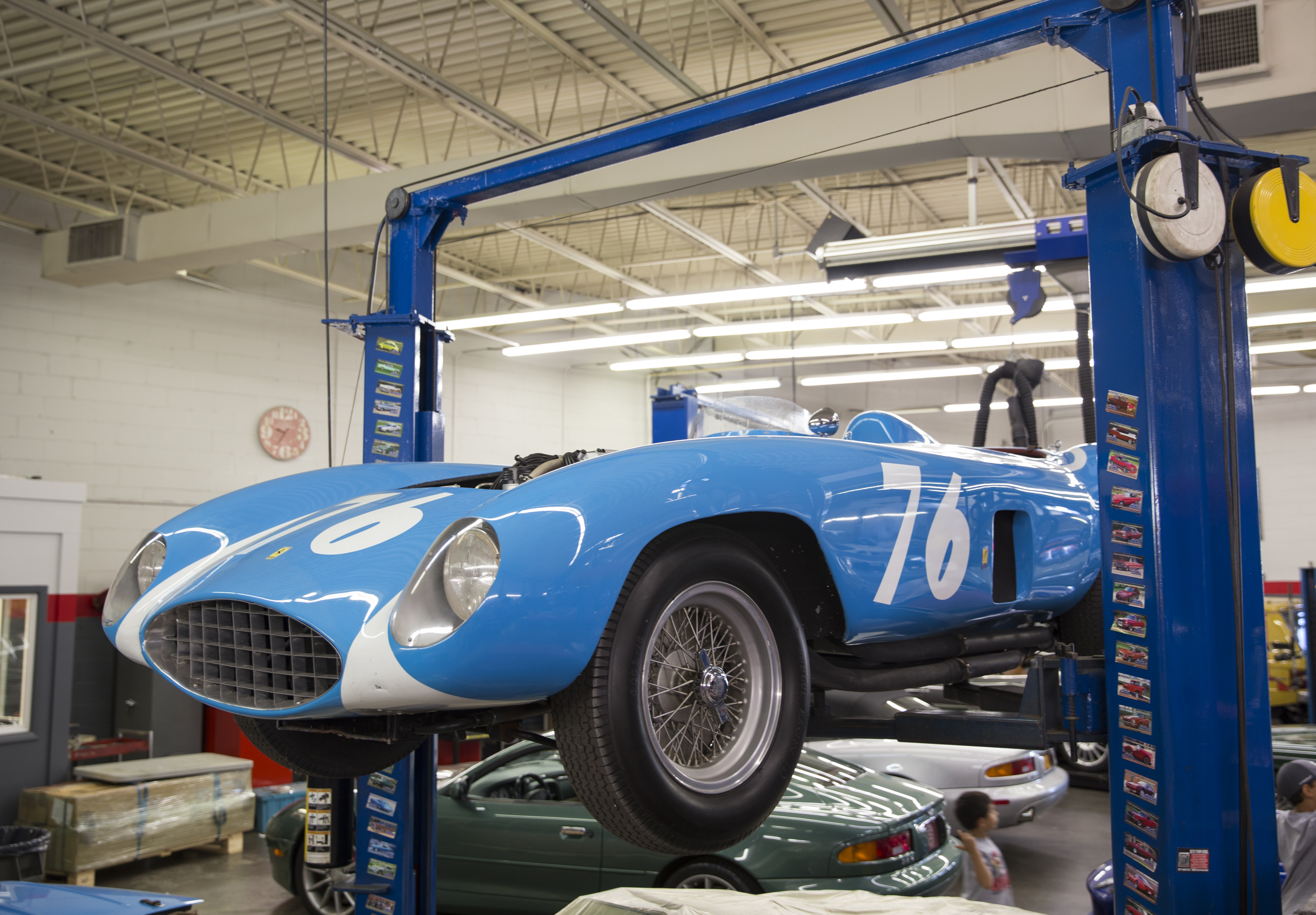
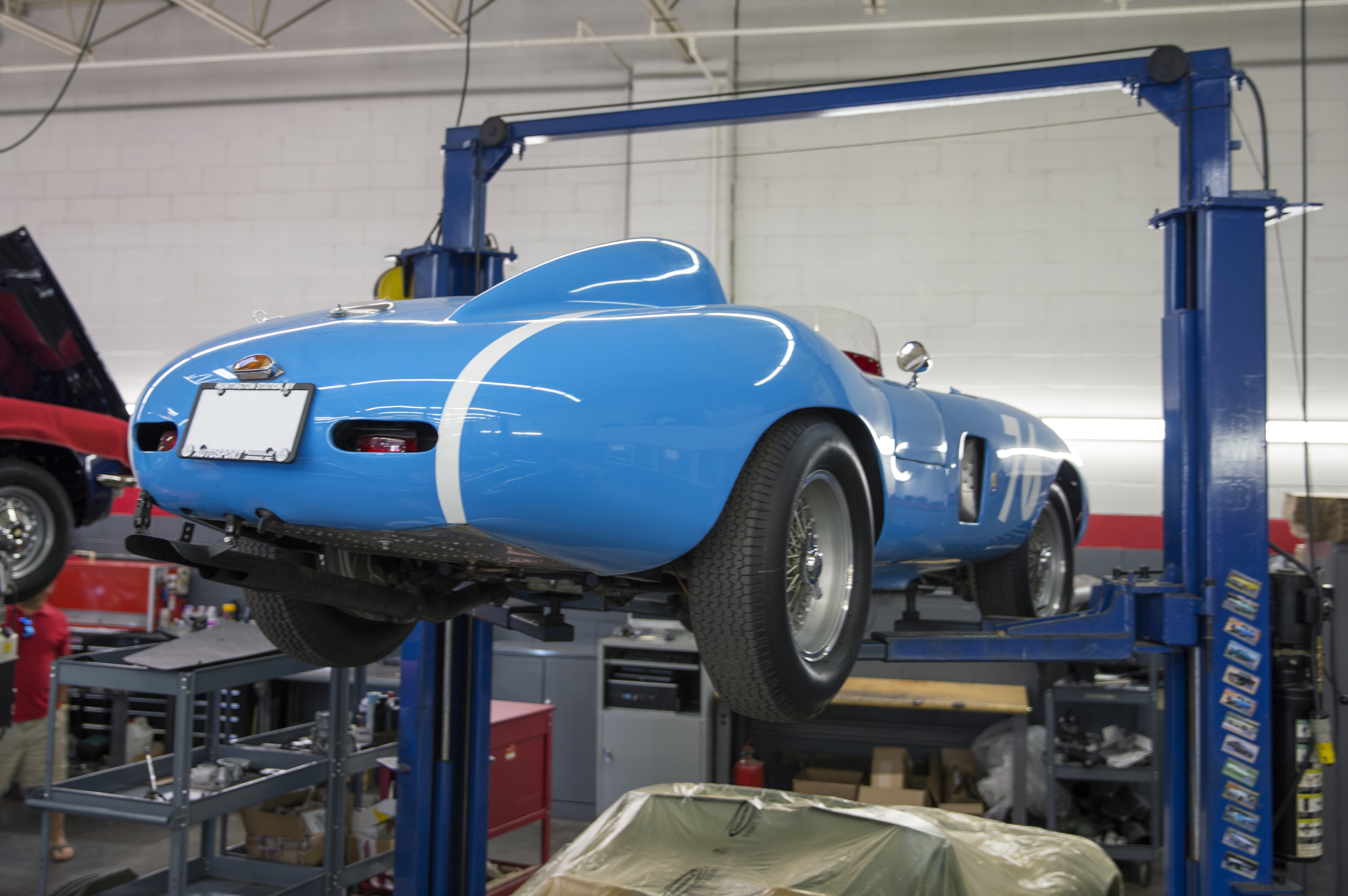
Ferrari 735 LM, chassis 0546LM

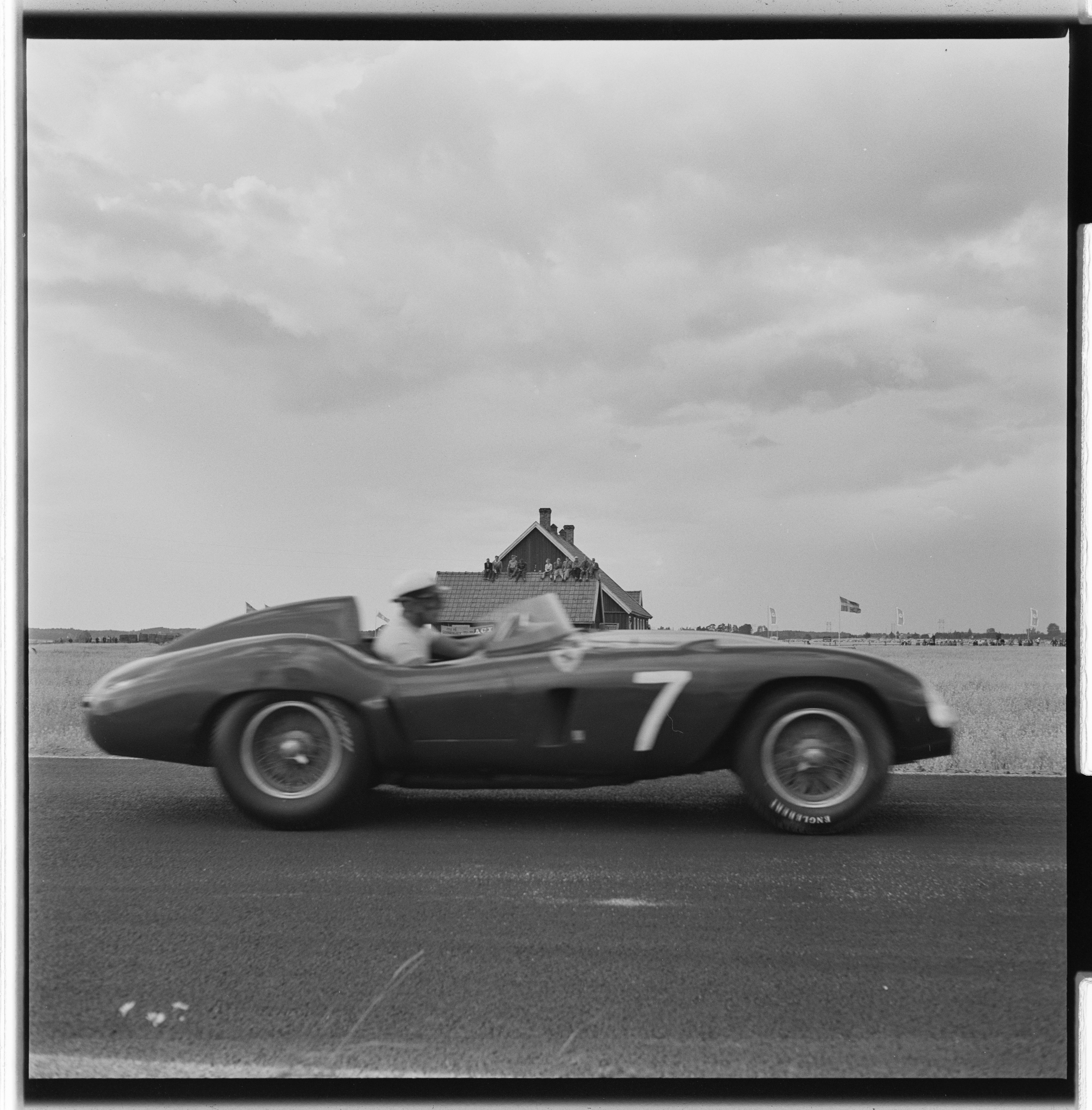
Eugenio Castellotti during 1955 Swedish GP

The first example of the 735 LM series raced in the 1955 Mille Miglia among smaller capacity 376 S and Monza siblings. Eugenio Castellotti entered the race as a privateer, but had to retire due to an engine problem.

For the 1955 24 Hours of Le Mans, Scuderia Ferrari entered three cars. Umberto Maglioli and Phil Hill drove car number 3, Eugenio Castellotti with Paolo Marzotto raced in car number 4, and Maurice Trintignant and Harry Schell were fielded in car number 5. The 735 LM was entered in the top ‘Sport 5.0’ category. It was the category that also included the Jaguar D-Type, Lagonda DP-166, and Cooper T38. Castellotti in the Ferrari no. 4, recorded the best practice lap time of all time at 4 minutes 14 seconds. Only a second slower was the Mercedes-Benz 300SLR of Juan Manuel Fangio. Also over the flying kilometre on the Mulsanne straight, the 735 LM recorded a top speed of 291.2 kilometres per hour (180.9 mph). Second was the Jaguar D-Type at 281.9 km/h. The actual race was disappointing for Ferrari as none of the fielded cars had finished the race. First, the car of Castellotti / Marzotto retired after 52 laps and five hours with a failed engine. After the seven-hour mark and covering only 76 laps, Maglioli and Hill fell out of the race with an overheating engine and clutch problems. The remaining Ferrari entry, car no. 5 with Trintignant and Schell, retired with a faulty clutch after 107 laps and 10 hours of racing. The race itself remained a black card in the history of motorsport because of the catastrophic crash that occurred, which came to be known as the 1955 Le Mans disaster.

Still in 1955, Umberto Maglioli entered the Aosta-Gran San Bernardo hillclimb and scored a first place overall. Later the same year, two cars were entered in the Swedish Grand Prix for sports cars. One finished third, driven by Eugenio Castellotti. The second, entered by Hawthorn, did not start.

After the failed Le Mans and imposition of the capacity caps for the 1956 season, all four cars ended up in the United States. Between 1955–1963 cars were raced by Jim Kimberly, Carroll Shelby, Phil Hill, Ray Cherryholmes, John Kilborn and Ernie McAfee with many victories in the SCCA and other race series in the US. McAfee, Shelby and Cherryholmes scored the most victories of all 735 LM drivers.

In April 1956, during the Del Monte Trophy in Pebble Beach, California, a fatal accident occurred in which Ernie McAfee lost his life. His car hit a tree and he was killed on impact. This event caused a ban of racing in Pebble Beach.

In 1957, three 735 LMs were entered in the Cuban Grand Prix. Two had retired and one had not arrived at all.

=== Racing results ===
(key)

Year	Entrant	Chassis	1	2	3	4	5	6
1955	—		(Argentina) BUE	(United States) SEB	(Italy) MMI	(France) LMS	(United Kingdom) TTR	(Italy) TGA
1955	(Italy) Scuderia Ferrari	0532LM				Ret		
1955	(Italy) Scuderia Ferrari	0546LM				Ret		
1955	(Italy) Scuderia Ferrari	0558LM			Ret	Ret		

== Collectability ==
Only four cars were made and all are in the hands of Ferrari collectors. Chassis number 0546LM was sold in 2017 at an RM Sotheby's auction for US$5.72 million.
