= 1955 Buenos Aires Grand Prix =

Race details
- Date: 30 January 1955
- Official name: XI Gran Premio Ciudad de Buenos Aires
- Location: Argentina
- Course: Permanent racing facility
- Course length: 4.705 km (2.924 mi)
- Distance: 60 laps, 282.30 km (175.41 mi)

Podium
First	(Argentina) Juan Manuel Fangio	Mercedes-Benz
Second	(United Kingdom) Stirling Moss	Mercedes-Benz
Third	(Argentina) José Froilán González (France) Maurice Trintignant	Ferrari

The 11th Gran Premio Ciudad de Buenos Aires was a Formula Libre motor race held on 30 January 1955 at the Autódromo 17 de Octubre in Buenos Aires. It pitted regular 2500cc F1 cars against Mercedes F1 chassis that were fitted with larger sportscars engines of the upcoming Mercedes-Benz 300 SLR.

It followed the 16 January 1955 Argentine Grand Prix F1 race that opened the 1955 World Championship of Drivers season. Held at the same circuit in hot weather, the GP was won after 96 laps by Fangio while suffering burns to his legs in his Mercedes-Benz W196. In between, on a street circuit, the 23 January 1955 1000 km Buenos Aires sports cars race was held, opening the FIA 1955 World Sportscar Championship season with a private Ferrari winning points for the brand.

The new Mercedes-Benz 300 SLR sports car chassis was not ready yet, despite being closely related to the Mercedes-Benz W196 F1 cars. Some of the enlarged 3.0 litre pump gas sportscar engines were ready, and they were tested in the four F1 chassis, replacing the high revving high compression high octane fuel 2.5 litre F1 engines.

The Libre race was held over two heats of 30 laps, with the winner decided by aggregate time. The event was won by Juan Manuel Fangio in a Mercedes-Benz W196, his teammate Stirling Moss was second, Kling 4th, Herrmann DNF.

José Froilán González shared two Ferrari 625, for third place with Maurice Trintignant, and for 10th with Farina.

== Classification ==
Pos	No.	Driver	Entrant	Constructor	Laps
1	2	(Argentina) Juan Manuel Fangio	Daimler-Benz	Mercedes-Benz W196 3.0	60
2	6	(United Kingdom) Stirling Moss	Daimler-Benz	Mercedes-Benz W196 3.0	60
3	12	(Argentina) José Froilán González (France) Maurice Trintignant	Scuderia Ferrari	Ferrari 625	60
4	4	(Germany) Karl Kling	Daimler-Benz	Mercedes-Benz W196 3.0	60
5	16	(France) Jean Behra	Officine Alfieri Maserati	Maserati 250F	60
6	24	(Argentina) Carlos Menditeguy	Officine Alfieri Maserati	Maserati 250F	60
7	20	(Italy) Sergio Mantovani (United States) Harry Schell	Officine Alfieri Maserati	Maserati 250F	60
8	22	(Italy) Luigi Musso (Italy) Sergio Mantovani	Officine Alfieri Maserati	Maserati 250F	60
9	32	(Argentina) Clemar Bucci	Clemar Bucci	Ferrari 625	60
10	10	(Italy) Giuseppe Farina (Argentina) José Froilán González	Scuderia Ferrari	Ferrari 625	59
11	14	(France) Maurice Trintignant (Italy) Umberto Maglioli	Scuderia Ferrari	Ferrari 625	59
12	40	(Argentina) Pablo Birger	Equipe Gordini	Gordini Type 16	58
13	38	(France) Élie Bayol	Equipe Gordini	Gordini Type 16	58
14	30	(Uruguay) Alberto Uría	Alberto Uría	Maserati 250F	54
15	48	(Argentina) Alfredo Pián (Argentina) Jose Manuel Faraoni (Argentina) Adolfo Schwelm Cruz	Alfredo Pián	Maserati A6GCM	47
16	42	(Argentina) Jesus Iglesias	Equipe Gordini	Gordini Type 16	47
17	18	(Argentina) Roberto Mieres	Officine Alfieri Maserati	Maserati 250F	45
	8	(Germany) Hans Herrmann	Daimler-Benz	Mercedes-Benz W196 3.0	18
	36	(Italy) Umberto Maglioli	Scuderia Ferrari	Ferrari 118LM	
