= Mercedes-Benz SLR =

Mercedes-Benz SLR is a designation shared by two cars:

- Mercedes-Benz 300 SLR, a 1955 sports racing car developed by Daimler-Benz
- Mercedes-Benz SLR McLaren, a 2004 road car co-developed by DaimlerChrysler and McLaren
