= Ferrari 375 Plus =

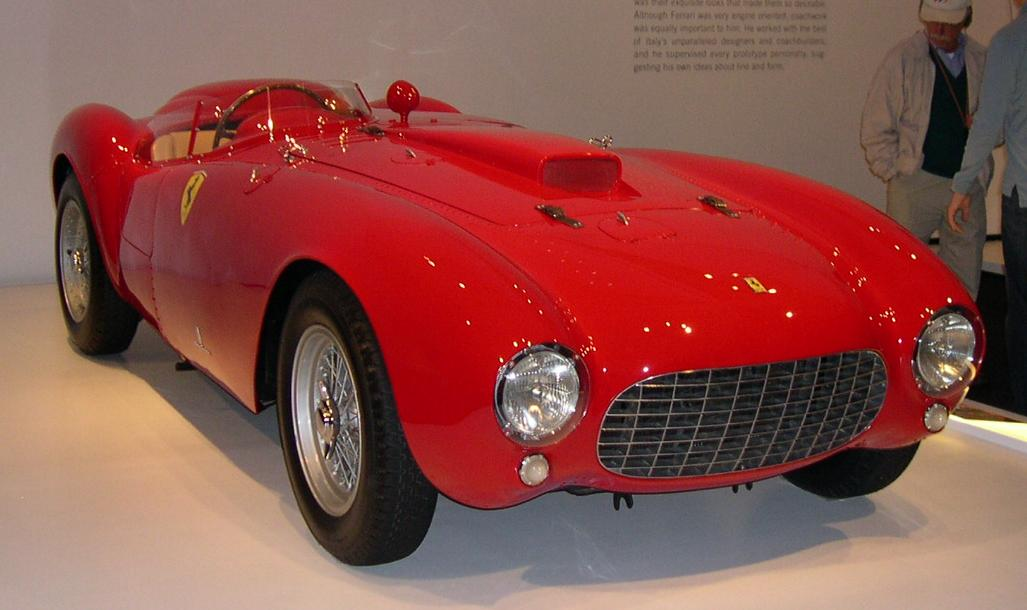
- Ferrari 375 Plus as part of Ralph Lauren Collection

Overview
- Manufacturer: Ferrari
- Production: 1954; 8 made (one was converted from 375 MM)
- Designer: Pinin Farina

Body and chassis
- Body style: Spyder; Cabriolet
- Layout: Front mid-engine, rear-wheel-drive

Powertrain
- Engine: 5.0 L (4954.34 cc) Tipo 113 Lampredi V12
- Power output: 330 PS
- Transmission: 4-speed manual; 5-speed manual

Dimensions
- Wheelbase: 2,600 mm (102.4 in)
- Curb weight: 1,030 kg (2,271 lb) (dry)

Chronology
- Predecessor: Ferrari 375 MM
- Successor: Ferrari 410 S

The Ferrari 375 Plus is a sports racing car produced by Ferrari in 1954. The model competed internationally, winning many major races, including 24 Hours of Le Mans, Carrera Panamericana, 1000km of Buenos Aires, Agadir GP and Silverstone.

== Specifications ==
=== Engine and transmission ===
The Ferrari 375 Plus received the new Lampredi V12 engine with displacement enlarged to almost 5-litres. This new tipo 113 was partially based on the 375 MM with its 84 mm of bore and combined 74.5 mm of stroke from the 375 Formula One car. The resulting capacity was 4,954.34 cc (5.0 L; 302.3 cu in). Most cars could produce 330 PS (243 kW; 325 hp) at 6000 rpm and some even up to 345 PS. This was enough for a top speed of 280 km/h. The engine had a single spark plug per cylinder configuration with two magnetos and was fed by three Weber 46DCF/3 carburettors. A single camshaft per cylinder bank was standard for the Lampredi V12s, unlike dry sump lubrication adopted for the last of the 'long-block' powered models: the 375 Plus and the 410 S. A 4-speed manual or 5-speed manual gearbox was used, mounted en bloc with differential.

=== Chassis and suspension ===
Although the wheelbase on the 375 Plus and its predecessor, the 375 MM, was the same at 2,600 mm (102.4 in), the chassis was of a new type 505. Also created of a steel tubes, elliptical in section. The front suspension was the same as on the previous models, independent with unequal-length wishbones and transverse leaf springs. The rear suspension however received a new de Dion axle, twin radius arms with transverse leaf springs and Houdaille shock absorbers in place of an old live axle with semi-elliptical springs. New setup greatly improved balance and road-holding. The fuel tank had 190 litres fuel capacity, especially welcomed on long-distance races. Drum brakes were standard all round.

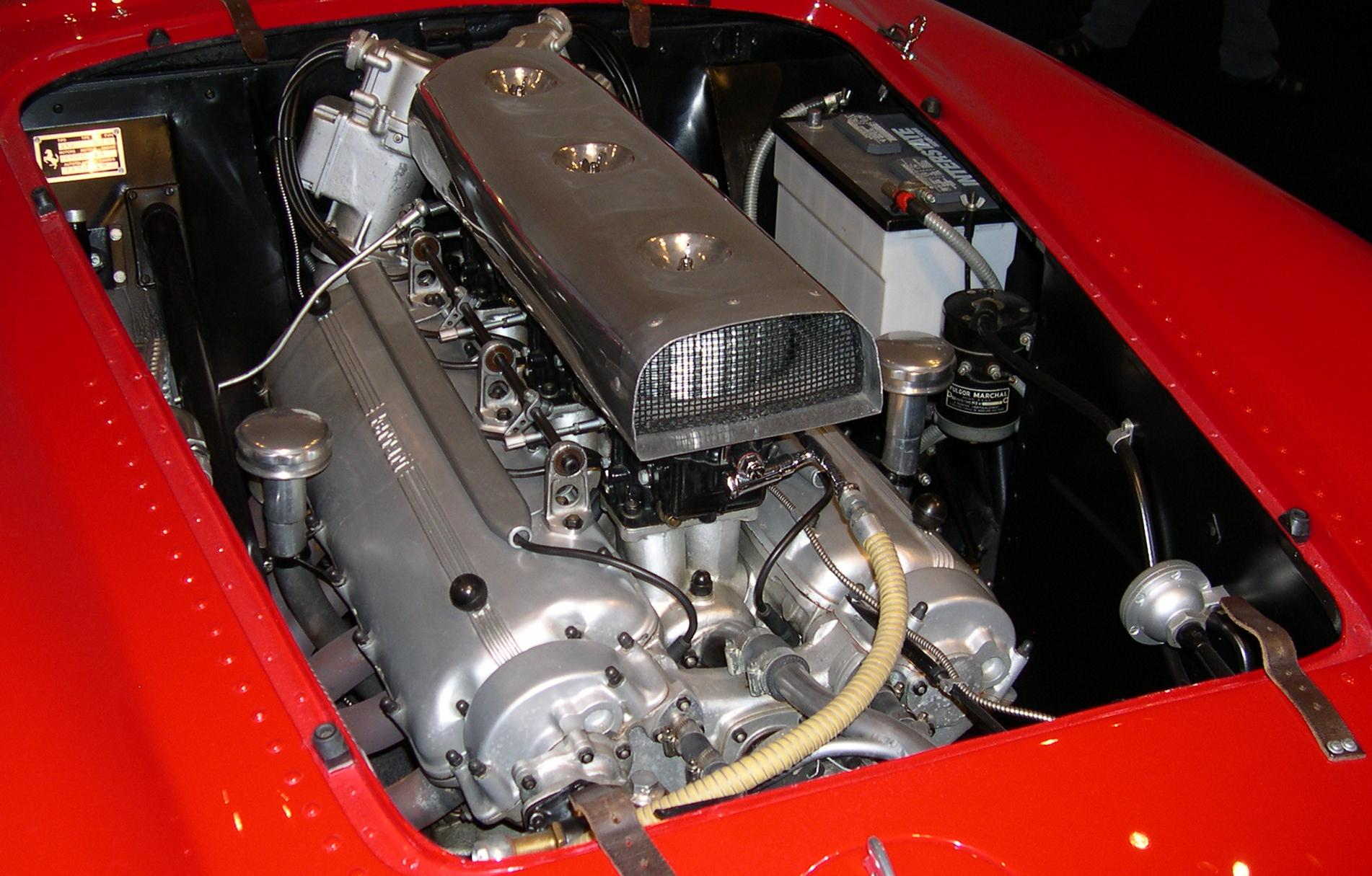
Ferrari 375 Plus' 5-litre Lampredi V12 engine

Bodywork was an evolution of the 375 MM Pinin Farina Spyder style with an exception of a bigger fuel tank bulge in the rear. One car, s/n 0478AM, was converted from 375 MM and rebodied by Sutton.

== Cabriolet ==
A one-off, two-seater Cabriolet was created on a 375 Plus' chassis, s/n 0488AM. King Leopold III of Belgium commissioned its creation to Pinin Farina. They created an elegant and stately gran tourer with an imposing front portion and unusually wide front grille. This special road-going Cabriolet was left-hand drive, received covered headlamps and was completed in 1955. Finished in black over ivory leather interior it was repainted red at a one point in its history.

== Racing ==
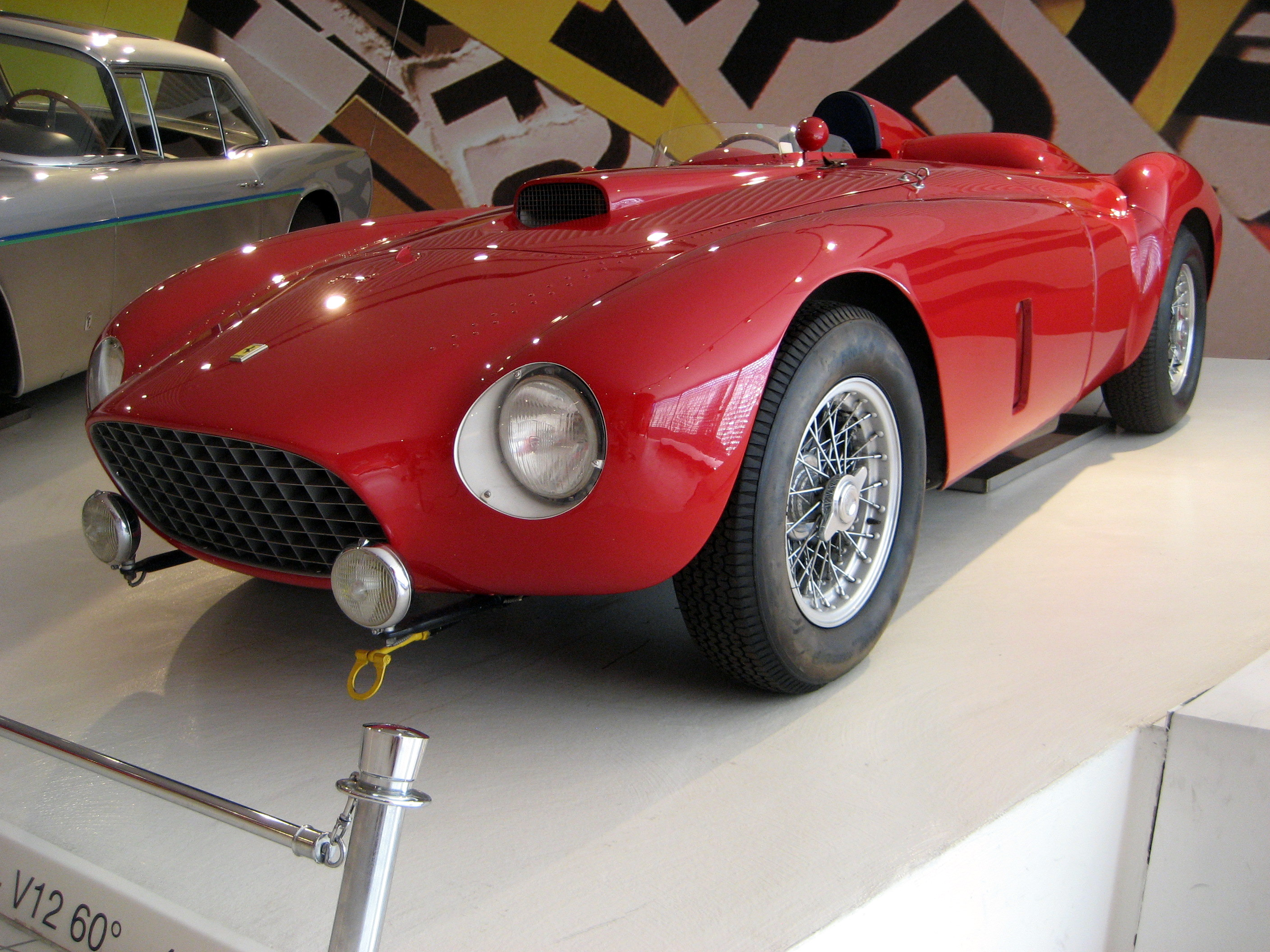
Ferrari 375 Plus that won Silverstone International in 1954

The Ferrari 375 Plus debuted slowly at first, not finishing the Giro di Sicilia nor the Mille Miglia races. José Froilán González and Maurice Trintignant won the 1954 24 Hours of Le Mans, for the first time since 1949, ahead of the works Jaguar D-type. The Agadir GP and the Silverstone International were also won by the 375 Plus. The most significant victory, however, was by Umberto Maglioli at the 1954 Carrera Panamericana. It would also be the last as the race was cancelled next year due to the Le Mans disaster. The 1954 World Sportscar Championship was achieved by Ferrari in due honour of 375 Plus that won two out of six rounds. The last major victory was at the 1955 1000 km Buenos Aires. That year, the World Sportscar Championship was dominated by the Mercedes-Benz 300 SLR.

The 375 Plus also won many races in both North and South Americas. In 1957-1958 Dan Gurney in 375 Plus scored wins in Paramount Ranch and Palm Springs and a second place in Grand Prix Riverside, part of 1958 United States Grand Prix for Sports Cars.

== Collectability ==
Low production numbers and undisputed racing pedigree makes the 375 Plus highly collectable and sought after. S/n 0384AM, Ferrari works car from the Mille Miglia, Le Mans and Silverstone was offered by Bonhams at the "Goodwood Festival of Speed Sale" auction and sold for £10.7 million in 2014. S/n 0398TF is part of Ralph Lauren Collection, who purchased the car in 1990.

== Racing results ==
(key)

Year	Entrant	Chassis	1	2	3	4	5	6	7
1954	—		(Argentina) BUE	(United States) SEB	(Italy) MMI	(France) LMS	(United Kingdom) TTR	(Mexico) PAN	
1954	(Italy) Scuderia Ferrari	0384AM			Ret	Ret			
1954	(Italy) Scuderia Ferrari	0386AM			Ret				
1954	(Italy) Scuderia Ferrari	0392AM			Ret	Ret			
1954	(United States) Erwin Goldschmidt	0392AM						1	
1954	(Italy) Scuderia Ferrari	0396AM			Ret	1			
1954	(United States) John Edgar	0396AM						Ret	
1955	—		(Argentina) BUE	(United States) SEB	(Italy) MMI	(France) LMS	(United Kingdom) TTR	(Italy) TGA	
1955	(United States) James Kimberly	0384AM		Ret					
1955	(Argentina) Enrique Saenz Valiente	0398TF	1						
1956	—		(Argentina) BUE	(United States) SEB	(Italy) MMI	(West Germany) NÜR	(Sweden) SWE		
1956	(United States) Howard Hively	0384AM		Ret					
1956	(Argentina) Enrique Saenz Valiente	0398TF	Ret						
1957	—		(Argentina) BUE	(United States) SEB	(Italy) MMI	(West Germany) NÜR	(France) LMS	(Sweden) SWE	(Venezuela) VEN
1957	(Argentina) Enrique Saenz Valiente	0398TF	Ret						
