= Ferrari 376 S =

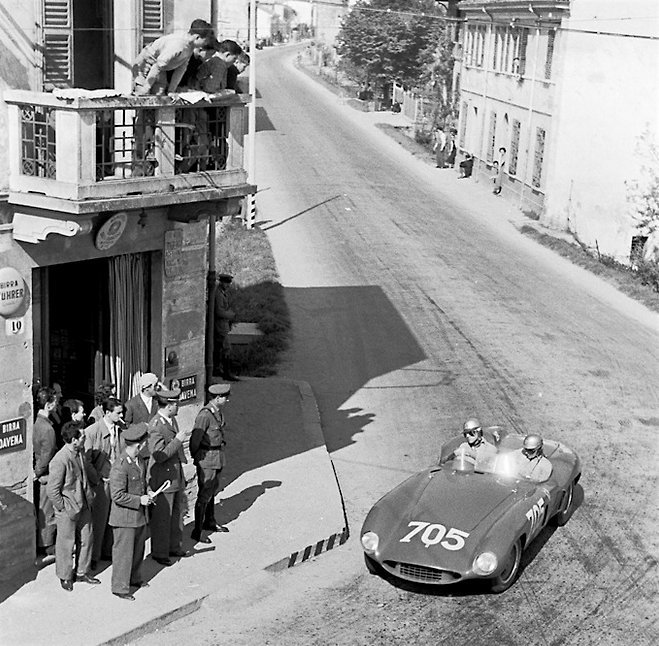
- Ferrari 376 S during 1955 Mille Miglia

Overview
- Manufacturer: Ferrari
- Also called: Ferrari 118 LM
- Production: 1955; 4 made (one was converted from 306 S)
- Designer: Carrozzeria Scaglietti

Body and chassis
- Body style: Spyder
- Layout: Front mid-engine, rear-wheel-drive

Powertrain
- Engine: 3.7 L (3747.48 cc) Tipo 118 Lampredi I6
- Power output: 280 PS
- Transmission: 5-speed manual

Dimensions
- Wheelbase: 2,240 mm (88.2 in) (306 S); 2,400 mm (94.5 in) (376 S)
- Curb weight: 850 kg (1,874 lb) (dry)

Chronology
- Predecessor: Ferrari 750 Monza
- Successor: Ferrari 735 LM

The Ferrari 376 S (also known as the 118 LM) was a sports racing car produced by Ferrari in 1955. It was the first raced Ferrari powered by a new Aurelio Lampredi-designed inline-6 engine, created as a larger alternative to the inline-4 series of engines used in the Ferrari Monza race cars. The intention behind the development of this model was the 1955 Mille Miglia race. It was yet another attempt by Ferrari to match the new Mercedes-Benz 300 SLR in competition. All of the created cars were further converted into a bigger capacity models.

== 306 S ==
The first Ferrari with an inline-six cylinder engine was the 306 S. It was a development prototype created in the late 1954. As the name suggests it sported a 3.0-litre (2,977.28 cc) Lampredi straight-six codenamed tipo 114. The new engine was created by adding two cylinders to the existing inline-four family of tested and tried Lampredi engines, particularly the Ferrari 500 engine. The 306 had a short 2,240 mm (88.2 in) wheelbase and was bodied by Scaglietti. The prototype never raced and, by January the next year, was converted into the 376 S model by increasing its capacity and stretching the wheelbase.

== Development ==
Prior to 1955, the Ferrari 750 Monza race car could produce a maximum of 260 PS (191 kW; 256 hp). This figure was not enough to match the 280–310 PS (206–228 kW; 276–306 hp) power output of the new Mercedes-Benz 300 SLR, with its engine based on the straight-8, W196 Formula One champion.

After creating a 3.0-litre prototype, Ferrari decided to increase the capacity further. Now at 3.7-litre, the new car could produce 280 PS (206 kW; 276 hp). This combined with a low weight could be enough to remain competitive. It was also decided to change the wheelbase to 2,400 mm (94.5 in). Chassis numbers had an "LM" suffix.

Body style was very much an evolution of the 750 Monza also bodied by Scaglietti. One of the cars was later further rebodied by the same coachbuilder and received a distinctive, more round front grille and pontoon-fenders.

The cars had raced in only a handful of races in 1955 and all four examples were subsequently upgraded to 4.4 L capacity, intended for the 1955 24 Hours of Le Mans. One car at the earliest by April 1955 for the Mille Miglia race. None of the 376 S' survive in their original form.

== Specifications ==
The enlarged engine was identified as the tipo 118, hence the common "118 LM" name of the car, even though this version did not participate in the Le Mans race. The internal measurements of one cylinder at 94 by 90 mm (3.7 by 3.5 in) of bore and stroke, were the same as the Ferrari 625 engine on which they were based. The total resulting capacity was 3.7 L (3,747.48 cc (228.7 cu in)). The three Weber 58DCOA/3 carburettors helped produce 280 PS (206 kW; 276 hp) at 6200 rpm. The engine used twin spark plugs per cylinder with two coils and had twin overhead camshaft design for two valves per cylinder. It also used a dry sump lubrication system.

The tubular steel chassis identified as the tipo 509 was the same as on the 306 S prototype. The whole car weighed only 850 kg (1,874 lb) when unladen. The fuel tank had 150-litres capacity.

The front suspension was independent with unequal-length wishbones. Coil springs with hydraulic shock absorbers were used, along with an anti-roll bar. Suspension at the rear used de Dion axle with twin arms and transverse leaf spring helped by hydraulic shock absorbers. The cars still used drum brakes all-round.

== Racing ==
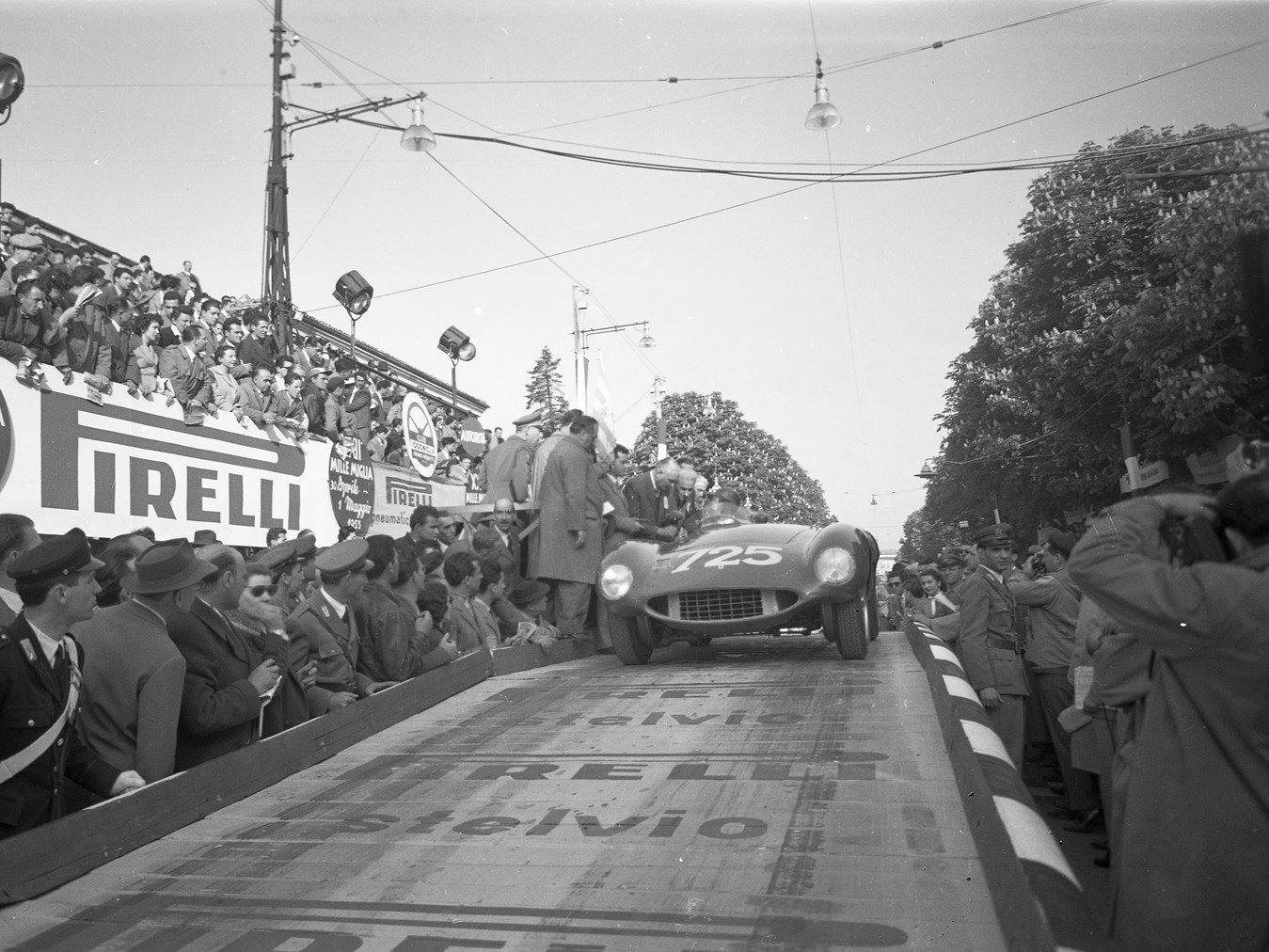
Paolo Marzotto at the start of 1955 Mille Miglia in Ferrari 376 S

The 376 S first outing was at the 1000 km Buenos Aires, driven by Froilan Gonzalez and Maurice Trintignant. Unfortunately, the team took a short cut and was disqualified for an incorrect entry into the pits.

The next major race was the 1955 Giro di Sicilia, where Piero Taruffi in one car and Umberto Maglioli in the other came first and second respectively in this 1088 km race. It would remain the only European victory for a straight-six Ferrari.

At the 1955 Mille Miglia the new Ferraris met their German opposition. Three Ferrari 376 S' were entered, but only one finished the race. Maglioli with Luciano Monteferraio came third overall, behind the two SLRs, competing in the same class. Taruffi actually led the race for one time, before retiring with a broken oil pump. The remaining 376 S, driven by Paolo Marzotto, had an accident due to worn tire. Eugenio Castellotti received the new 4.4 L-engined 735 LM but did not finish the race due to engine problems. The last achievement of the 376 S was with Giuseppe Farina scoring sixth place in the Eifelrennen Nürburgring race in May 1955.

== Racing results ==
(key)

Year	Entrant	Chassis	1	2	3	4	5	6
1955	—		(Argentina) BUE	(United States) SEB	(Italy) MMI	(France) LMS	(United Kingdom) TTR	(Italy) TGA
1955	(Italy) Scuderia Ferrari	0484LM	DSQ		Ret			
1955	(Italy) Scuderia Ferrari	0532LM			3			
1955	(Italy) Scuderia Ferrari	0546LM			Ret			
