= 1955 1000 km Buenos Aires =

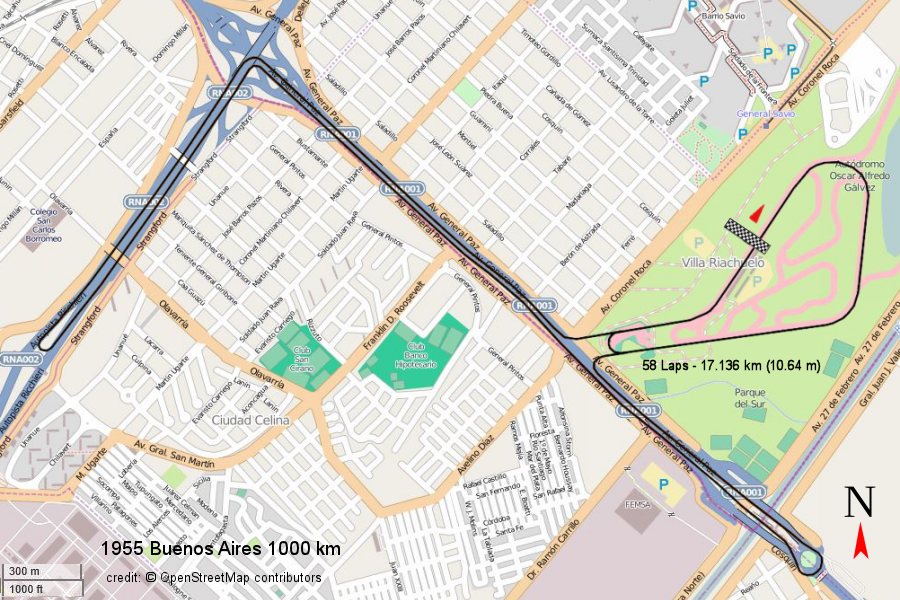
Circuit Callejero - Buenos Aires 1000km (1955)

The 1955 1000 km Buenos Aires took place on 23 January, on the Autódromo Municipal-Avenida Paz, (Buenos Aires, Argentina). It was the second running of the race, and once again, it was the opening round of the F.I.A. World Sports Car Championship. For this event, a longer section of the Autopista General Pablo Riccheri route was added, making the circuit 17,136 km (10,648 miles) in length.

== Report ==
=== Entry ===
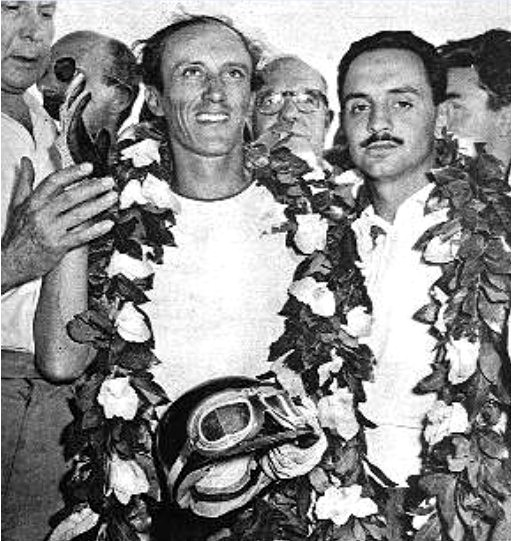
Valiente/Ibanez - Winners of the 1000 km of Buenos Aires

Despite being a World Championship event, international participation was low, as the majority of drivers and cars were from Argentina.

The week prior, seven Argentinians had entered the 1955 Argentine Grand Prix, with defending World Champion Juan Manuel Fangio winning for Mercedes, but suffering burns to his leg. Most of the visiting F1 pilots remained absent from the 1000 km race, but some would stay on for two weeks and enter the 30 January 1955 Buenos Aires Grand Prix Formula Libre race with their F1 cars. Mercedes did the same, but took the chance to test their new sports car engine. The new Mercedes-Benz 300 SLR sports car chassis was not ready yet, but its enlarged 3 litre straight-8 pump gas engine would be fitted into the single seater Mercedes-Benz W196 Formula 1 cars. The Formula Libre race was won by Fangio ahead of Moss in their Formula Sports hybrids.

Jaguar did not travel to the southern hemisphere, thus the first major sports car race of the year was poorly supported by the works teams. Only Scuderia Ferrari and Equipe Gordini brought works cars from Europe, two each. Anyway, also private team could earn championships point for the brand they had chosen to race.

Ferrari sent a Ferrari 376 S for Maurice Trintignant and José Froilán González, and a 750 Monza for Umberto Maglioli and Clemar Bucci, which both were disqualified in the race. France was represented by a Gordini T24S in the hands of Élie Bayol and Harry Schell, and a T15 for the Argentine pairing of Adolfo Schwelm Cruz and Pedro J. Llano. The remainder of the field were cars from South America.

A total of 55 racing cars were registered, all of which arrived for practice and qualifying.

=== Qualifying ===
The French Grand Prix racer Trintignant took pole position for Scuderia Ferrari, in the No. 10 Ferrari 118 LM (aka Ferrari 376 S).

=== Race ===
The race was held over 58 laps of the 17,136 km (10,648 mile) Autódromo Municipal Avenida Paz, giving a total distance of 993,888 km (617,574 miles). In the race, both factory Ferraris were disqualified for push starting and engine, which did not hurt Ferrari's championships effort as it left the win to the privately entered Ferrari 375 Plus of Enrique Saenz Valiente and José-Maria Ibanez. Leading by nearly five minutes, car number 4 took an impressive victory, winning in a time of 6 hr 35 min 15.4 s, averaging a speed of 150,873 km/h (93,748 mph). In second was another locally prepared Ferrari 375, of Carlos Najurieta and César Rivero. The podium was complete by Equipo Presidente Peron’s Maserati A6GCS of José M. Faraoni and Ricardo Grandio, who were two laps adrift, but did win their class.

== Official Classification ==
Class Winners are in Bold text.

Pos	No	Class	Driver		Entrant	Chassis	Laps	Reason Out
1st	**4**	**S+3.0**	(Argentina) **Enrique Saenz Valiente**	(Argentina) **José-Maria Ibanez**		**Ferrari 375 Plus**	**6hr 35:15.4, 58**	
2nd	8	S3.0	(Argentina) Carlos Najurieta	(Argentina) César Rivero		Ferrari 375 MM	6hr 40:12.1, 58	
3rd	**30**	**S3.0**	(Argentina) **José M. Faraoni**	(Argentina) **Ricardo Grandio**		**Maserati A6GCS/53**	**56**	
4th	**34**	**S1.5**	(Guatemala) **Jaroslav Juhan**	(Argentina) **Jorge Salas Chaves**		**Porsche 550 Spyder**	**56**	
5th	14	S3.0	(France) Élie Bayol	(United States) Harry Schell	Equipe Gordini	Gordini T24S	54	
6th	26	S3.0	(Argentina) Jorge Camano	(Argentina) Oscar Camaňo		Ferrari 212 Export	54	
7th	32	S3.0	(Argentina) Alejandro de Tomaso	(Argentina) César Reyes		Maserati A6GCS	52	
8th	**52**	**Mod. T**	(Argentina) **Oscar Alfredo Gálvez**	(Brazil) **Eduardo Martins**		**Ford V-8**	**52**	
9th	18	S3.0	(Argentina) Luis Milán	(Argentina) Elpidio Tortone		Ferrari 625 TF	51	
10th	50	Mod. T	(Argentina) Juan-Carlos Garavaglia	(Argentina) Manuel Rodríguez		Ford V-8	51	
11th	66	Mod. T	(Argentina) Guillermo G. Airaldi	(Argentina) Douglas Marimon		Alfa Romeo 1900	49	
12th	102	Mod. T	(Argentina) Angel de la Rosa	(Argentina) Angel Antenine		Ford V-8	48	
13th	96	Mod. T	(Argentina) Hector della Romana			Ford V-8	45	
14th	48	S1.5	(Argentina) Patricio Badaracco	(Argentina) Ernesto Tornquist		Cisitalia-Abarth 202	44	
15th	92	Mod. T	(Argentina) Eugenio Modica	(Argentina) Ignacio Espina		Ford V-8	43	
16th	24	S3.0	(Argentina) Angel Maiocchi	(Argentina) Carlos Lostalo		Ferrari 225 S Vignale Spyder	42	
17th	70	Mod. T	(Argentina) Antonio Pereyra	(Argentina) A. Cea		Ford V-8	42	
18th	22	S3.0	(Argentina) Alvaro Piano	(Argentina) Miguel Schroeder		Ferrari 225 S	42	
DNF	12	S+3.0	(Argentina) José M. Millet	(Argentina) Gabriel Gabin		Jaguar C-Type	41	Fuel tank
DNF	40	S3.0	(Argentina) Adolfo Schwelm Cruz	(Argentina) Pedro J. Llano	Equipe Gordini	Gordini T15S	40	Gearbox
19th	90	Mod.T	(Argentina) Juan V. Carrica	(Argentina) J. Arias Moreno		Ford V-8	39	
DISQ	20	S3.0	(Italy) Umberto Maglioli	(Argentina) Clemar Bucci	Scuderia Ferrari	Ferrari 750 Monza	33	Push start
DISQ	10	S+3.0	(France) Maurice Trintignant	(Argentina) José Froilán González	Scuderia Ferrari	Ferrari 376 S	27	Incorrect entry into pits
NC	38	S1.5	(West Germany) Curt Delfosse			Gordini-Porsche T15 Special	22	
DNF	2	S+3.0	(Argentina) Franco Bruno	(Argentina) Carlos Bruno		Allard-Cadillac J2X	19	Brakes
DNF	6	S+3.0	(Argentina) Roberto Bonomi	(Argentina) Ernesto Florenico Castro Cranwell		Ferrari 375 MM Speciale	7	Fuel system
DNF	16	S3.0	(Argentina) Alberto Rodríguez Larreta	(Argentina) David Speroni		Ferrari 250 MM Pinin Farina		Brakes
DNF	36	S1.5	(Argentina) Tomas Mayol	(Argentina) Juan Gobbi		Porsche 356 Super		Axle
DNF	40	S1.5	(Argentina) Ernesto Tornquist	(Argentina) Miguel Nadie		Porsche 550 Spyder		Accident
DNF	42	S1.5	(Argentina) Lucio Bollaert	(Argentina) Carlos Stabile		Gordini T15S		Gearbox
DNF	46	S1.5	(Argentina) Jorge B. Saggese	(Argentina) Rafaele Sedano Acosta		Abarth 207A Spyder Sport		Engine
DNF	54	Mod. T	(Argentina) Ernesto Petrini	(Argentina) Domingo Colanero		Ford V-8		DNF
DNF	56	Mod. T	(Argentina) Felix Alberto Peduzzi	(Argentina) Eduardo del Molino		Chevrolet Bel Air		DNF
DNF	58	Mod. T	(Argentina) Jorge Descote			Ford V-8		DNF
DNF	60	Mod. T	(Argentina) Pablo Birger			Ford V-8		DNF
DNF	62	Mod. T	(Argentina) Esteban Sokol	(Argentina) E. Ojea		Ford V-8		DNF
DNF	64	Mod. T	(Argentina) Ernesto Blanco	(Argentina) N. Larocca		Ford V-8		DNF
DNF	68	Mod. T	(Argentina) Juan Fernando Piersanti	(Argentina) J. Colanero		Ford V-8		DNF
DNF	74	Mod. T	(Argentina) Juan C. Navone	(Argentina) D. Teseire		Ford V-8		DNF
DNF	76	Mod. T	(Argentina) Marcelo Aloe Velcher	(Argentina) B. Marciulevicus		Chevrolet Bel Air		DNF
DNF	78	Mod. T	(Argentina) Elmer J. Oppen			Ford V-8		DNF
DNF	80	Mod. T	(Argentina) Rodolfo de Ălzaga	(Argentina) R. Luro		Ford V-8		DNF
DNF	82	Mod. T	(Argentina) José Lorenzetti			Ford V-8		DNF
DNF	84	Mod. T	(Argentina) Enrique D’Ascanio	(Argentina) Hugo Vázquez		Ford V-8		DNF
DNF	86	Mod. T	(Argentina) Luis F. González	(Argentina) J. N. Soto		Ford V-8		DNF
DNF	88	Mod. T	(Argentina) Plinio Rosetto			Ford V-8		DNF
DNF	94	Mod. T	(Argentina) Raul Alonso			Ford V-8		DNF
DNF	98	Mod. T	(Argentina) Antonio Gomez			Ford V-8		DNF
DNF	100	S+3.0	(Argentina) “Carming”	(Argentina) Carlos Guimarey		Maserati-Ford		DNF
DNF	104	Mod. T	(Argentina) Francisco de Ridder	(Argentina) Carlo Tomasi		Ford V-8		DNF
DNF	106	Mod. T	(Argentina) Segundo Ale	(Argentina) E, Canriero		Chevrolet Bel Air		DNF
DNF	110	Mod. T	(Argentina) Elmer J. Oppen			Ford V-8		DNF
DNF	111	Mod. T	(Argentina) Emilio Boretto			Ford V-8		DNF
DNS	3	S1.5	(Argentina) Ernesto Tornquist			Gordini T11S		Engine
DNS	44	S1.5	(Argentina) Oscar J. González	(Argentina) Jorge Malbrand		Porsche 550 Spyder		
DNS	72	Mod.T	(Argentina) Tadeo Taddia	(Argentina) Sebastián Messino		Chevrolet Bel Air		

- Fastest Lap: José Froilán González, 6:06.1secs (104.704 mph)

=== Class Winners ===
Class	Winners		
Sports +3000	4	Ferrari 375 Plus	Saenz Valiente / Ibanez
Sports 3000	30	Maserati A6GCS/53	Faraoni / Grandio
Sports 1500	34	Porsche 550 Spyder	Juhan / Salas Chaves
Modified Touring	52	Ford V-8	Gálvez / Martins

== Standings after the race ==
Pos	Championship	Points
1	(Italy) Ferrari	8
2	(Italy) Maserati	4
3	(West Germany) Porsche	3
4	(France) Gordini	2

- Note: Only the top five positions are included in this set of standings.
  Championship points were awarded for the first six places in each race in the order of 8-6-4-3-2-1. Manufacturers were only awarded points for their highest finishing car with no points awarded for positions filled by additional cars. Only the best 4 results out of the 6 races could be retained by each manufacturer. Points earned but not counted towards the championship totals are listed within brackets in the above table.

World Sportscar Championship
Previous race: 1954 Carrera Panamericana	1955 season	Next race: 12 Hours of Sebring
