= Guerci =

Guerci is an Italian surname. Notable people with the surname include:

- Alex Guerci (born 1989), Italian footballer
- Mario Guerci (1913–1990), Argentine rower
- Paolo Guerci, Italian engineer who has spent his career in auto racing, active late 1970s to the present
