= 1955 Targa Florio =

The 39a Targa Florio took place on 16 October, around the Circuito delle Madonie, Sicily, Italy. It was also the sixth and final round of the F.I.A. World Sports Car Championship as the Carrera Panamericana was cancelled and the Targa was allowed to take the late season slot, as a second Italian round after the Mille Miglia in May. The title lay between Ferrari, Jaguar and Mercedes-Benz, with Ferrari leading 19 points from one win to 16 from the other two marques which had two wins each, but no other results. Mercedes had skipped the first two heats and withdrew from Le Mans after the disaster, while leading the race. Jaguar did not show up in Sicily at the unknown 72 km long road track, but Mercedes came three weeks early to practice with seven cars. Finishing 1–2–4, Mercedes secured the championship.

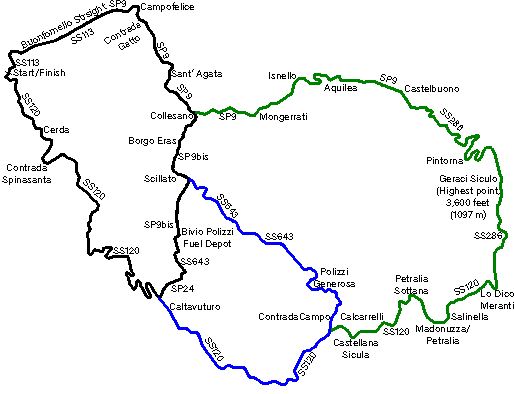
Circuito delle Madonie, Piccolo in black

== Report ==
=== Entry ===
A grand total of 65 racing cars were registered for this event, of which 64 arrived for practice and qualifying. Scuderia Ferrari entered a pair of Ferrari 750 Monzas for Carroll Shelby and Gino Munaron, and Umberto Maglioli and Sergio Sighinolfi, alongside a 860 Monza for the partnership of Eugenio Castellotti and Robert Manzon. One of their closest championship rivals, Jaguar, did not enter not all, leaving it to just one locally entered Jaguar XK120 to take up to the fight. Meanwhile, Officine Alfieri Maserati sent a total of six works cars across the Strait of Messina to keep their very slim championship hopes alive. Amongst their line-up was Luigi Musso, Giorgio Scarlatti and Franco Bordoni.

The third marque chasing the title, Daimler-Benz AG entered three of their Mercedes-Benz 300SLRs to tackle the 44.64 mile circuit. They had decided to quit racing at the end of the 1955 season, but one last major attempt was made to wrest the World Sports Car Championship away from Ferrari. The cars were to be driven by Juan Manuel Fangio and Karl Kling, Stirling Moss and Peter Collins, and John Fitch with former Jaguar driver, Desmond Titterington.

=== Race ===
The race was held over 13 laps of the 44.64 miles of the Circuito delle Madonie Piccolo, giving a distance of 581.604 miles. Each team of drivers was expected to navigate approximately 10,000 curves during almost 10 hours of driving combined. The Daimler team manager, Alfred Neubauer was planning on each driver being able to run four lap stints.

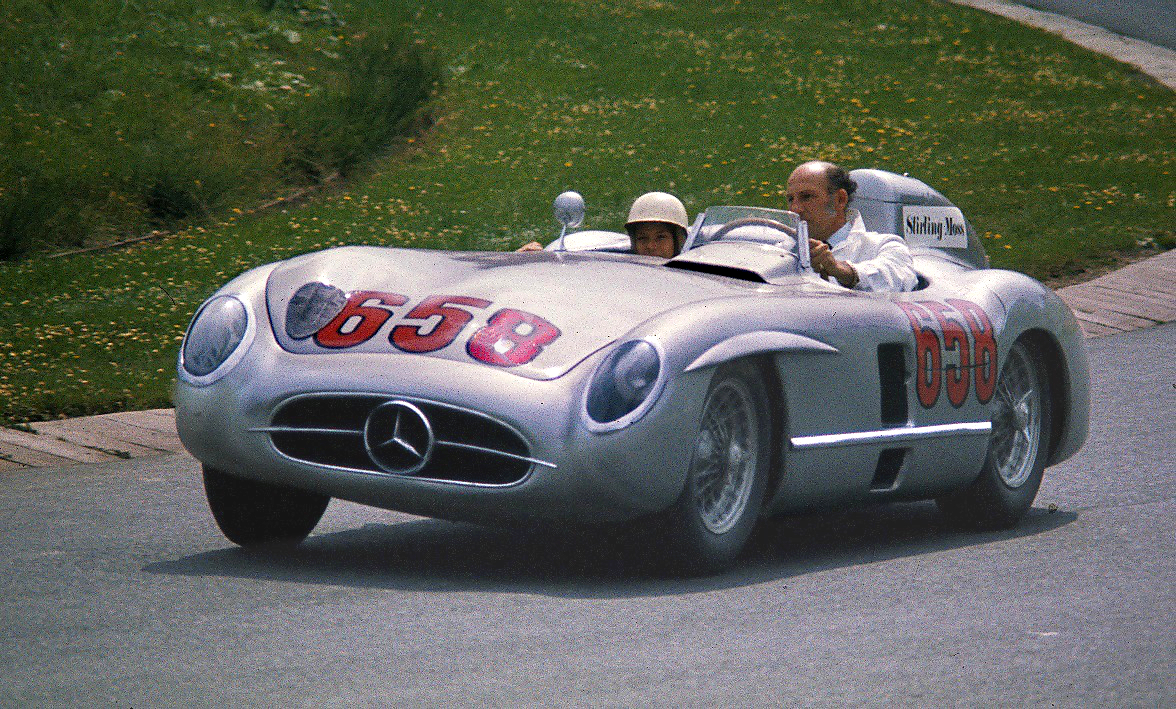
Mercedes-Benz 300 SLR similar to the 1955 winner driven by Stirling Moss and Peter Collins

The first car, an Alfa Romeo 1900 TI started off at 07:00, with subsequent cars departing every 30 seconds. The first of the main competitors, the Ferrari 750 Monza driven by Luigi Piotti and Franco Cornacchia would leave at 07:24:30. Very quickly, Moss set a blistering pace and broke the track record by two and a half minutes. Although his Mercedes was one of the last to be flagged off, he had passed everyone by the end of lap one.

Castellotti's Ferrari split the Mercedes of Moss and Fangio. At the end of the fourth lap Castellotti was in first place and Moss was in a ditch. Moss had crashed but the Mercedes was still in working order if slightly bruised. After help from some spectators Moss was back on the road but now in fourth place. Collins exchanged places with Moss and took up the chase. Fangio passed the leading Ferrari and handed his car to Kling. Mercedes were now in first, third and fourth. The Mercedes of Moss and Collins would certainly have its fair share of obvious moments, scattered all around the car's body. Still, it was going very fast. The area around the headlights were badly damaged, front corners on both sides were stripped away. And the right side panel looked as though they had had a number of encounters with buildings as the two Englishmen pushed the 300SLR hard through the Sicilian countryside.

On one occasion, Moss pushed at a bit too hard and would go careening off the side of the track. The car avoided heavy damage, and with the help of some local spectators, Moss would rejoin the race, still leading. Trouble struck again when Collins drove straight up a stone wall, his front wheels spinning in the air. Fortunately he was able to put his car in reverse and rejoined the battle. Collins worked his way up to first before returning the car to Moss.

Moss drove the only way that he knew how and won going away or in the words of Peter Collins "despite Stirling's efforts and my own to write the machine off!" Mercedes won the race and with it the sports car championship only to quit racing for the second time.

As a result, car number 104 (Daimler-Benz AG), took an impressive victory, winning in a time of 9hrs 43.14 mins., averaging a speed of 59.832 mph. Second place went to Fangio and Kling, for the second race in a row, 4mins and 41 seconds adrift. The podium was complete by the Ferrari 857 S of Castellotti and Manzon, a further 5mins 25 behind. Meanwhile, the third Mercedes of Titterington and Fitch were fourth. Next home was the first of the Maserati's, in hand of Carlos Manzini and Francesco Giardini.

== Official Classification ==
Class Winners are in Bold text.

Pos	No	Class	Driver		Entrant	Chassis	Laps	Reason Out
1st	**104**	**S+2.0**	(United Kingdom) **Stirling Moss**	(United Kingdom) **Peter Collins**	**Daimler Benz AG**	**Mercedes-Benz 300 SLR**	**9hr 43:14.0, 13**	
2nd	112	S+2.0	(Argentina) Juan Manuel Fangio	(West Germany) Karl Kling	Daimler Benz AG	Mercedes-Benz 300 SLR	9hr 47:55.2, 13	
3rd	116	S+2.0	(Italy) Eugenio Castellotti	(France) Robert Manzon	Scuderia Ferrari	Ferrari 857 S	9hr 53:20.4, 13	
4th	106	S+2.0	(United Kingdom) Desmond Titterington	(United States) John Fitch	Daimler Benz AG	Mercedes-Benz 300 SLR	9hr 54:53.4, 13	
5th	**76**	**S2.0**	(Italy) **Carlo Manzini**	(Italy) **Francesco Giardini**	**Officine Alfieri Maserati**	**Maserati A6GCS**	**10hr 41:15.0, 13**	
6th	82	S2.0	(Italy) Giuseppe Musso	(Italy) Giuseppe Rossi	Officine Alfieri Maserati	Maserati A6GCS	10hr 48:53.2, 13	
7th	**64**	**S1.5**	(Italy) **Giulio Cabianca**	(Italy) **Piero Carini**	**Automobili OSCA**	**Osca MT4 1500**	**10hr 51:37.4, 13**	
8th	78	S2.0	(Italy) Giorgio Scarlatti	(Italy) Osvaldo Lippi	Officine Alfieri Maserati	Maserati A6GCS	11hr 03:28.0, 13	
9th	92	S2.0	(Italy) Luigi Bellucci	(Italy) Maria Teresa de Filippis	Officine Alfieri Maserati	Maserati A6GCS/53	11hr 22:53.0, 13	
DNF	16	GT	(Italy) Armando Zampiero	(Italy) Luigi Villotti		Mercedes-Benz 300 SL	12	DNF
10th	84	S2.0	(Italy) Gaetano Starrabba	(Italy) Salvatore La Pira		Maserati A6GCS	12	
11th	**6**	**TS+1.3**	(Italy) **Elio Zagato**	(Italy) **Ovidio Capelli**		**Fiat 8V Zagato**	**12**	
12th	72	S2.0	(Italy) Alberico Cacciari (Italy) Azzurro Manzini	(Italy) Vincenzo Sorrentino		Maserati A6GCS	12	
13th	4	TS+1.3	(Italy) Giuseppe de Sarzana	(Italy) Clemente Ravetto		Fiat 8V	12	
14th	**42**	**S1.1**	(Italy) **Domenico Rotolo**	(Italy) **Luigi di Pasquale**	**Automobili OSCA**	**Osca MT4 1100**	12	
15th	**36**	**GT**	(Italy) **Francesco Arezzo**	(Italy) **Gennaro Alterio**		**Fiat 8V Zagato**	71	
DNF	30	GT	(Italy) Ottavio Guarducci	(Italy) Mario Lietti		Fiat 8V	11	DNF
16th	88	S2.0	(Italy) Guido Perrella	(Italy) Mario Sannino		Alfa Romeo 1900	11	
17th	86	S2.0	(Italy) Enzo Lopez	(Italy) Ferdinando Lopez		Maserati A6GCS	11	
18th	52	GT	(France) Guy Michel	(Italy) Alfredo Fondi		Renault 4CV	11	
19th	70	S2.0	(Italy) Bruno Gavazzoli	(Italy) Gastone Crepaldi		Maserati A6GCS	11	
20th	20	TS+1.3	(Italy) Vincenzo Arena	(Italy) Gianfernando Tomaselli		Lancia Aurelia	11	
DNF	120	S+2.0	(Italy) Umberto Maglioli	(Italy) Sergio Sighinolfi	Scuderia Ferrari	Ferrari 750 Monza	10	Lost wheel
DNF	100	S+2.0	(Italy) Luigi Piotti	(Italy) Franco Cornacchia		Ferrari 750 Monza	9	DNF
DNF	12	TS+1.3	(Italy) Guido Cestelli-Guidi	(Italy) Guerci		Alfa Romeo 1900 TI	8	DNF
DNF	56	S1.1	(West Germany) Hans Finke	(West Germany) Fritz Kornekauer		Kieft-Climax 1100	8	DNF
DNF	22	GT	(Italy) Domenico Tramontana	(Italy) Giuseppe Alotta		Lancia Aurelia	7	DNF
DNF	74	S2.0	(Italy) Franco Cortese	(Italy) Antonio Pucci		Ferrari 500 Mondial	7	Accident
DNF	40	S1.1	(Italy) Francesco Spinel	(Italy) Armando Soldano		Siata 1100 GT	6	DNF
DNF	54	S1.1	(Italy) Bruno Ricciardi	(Italy) Angelo Sbordone		Osca MT4 1100	6	DNF
DNF	62	S1.5	(Italy) Giovanni Buoncristiani	(Italy) Piero Altini		Ermini-Fiat	6	DNF
DNF	102	S+2.0	(Italy) Mario Ricci	(Italy) Piero Scotti	Franco Bordoni	Gordini T24S	6	DNF
DNF	24	GT	(Italy) Alfonso Vella	(Italy) Pietro Termini		Jaguar XK120	5	DNF
DNF	48	S1.1	(Italy) Francesco Mentesana	(Italy) Gaetano Marotta		Cisitalia 202	5	DNF
DNF	110	S+2.0	(United States) Carroll Shelby	(Italy) Gino Munaron	Scuderia Ferrari	Ferrari 750 Monza	5	Accident
DNF	10	TS+1.3	(Italy) Baldassare Taormina	(Italy) Pasquale Tacci		Alfa Romeo 1900 TI	4	DNF
DNF	28	GT	(Italy) Mennato Boffa	(Italy) Giuseppe Ruggero		Lancia Aurelia	4	DNF
DNF	94	S2.0	(Italy) Fernando Mancini	(Switzerland) Benoît Musy	Tony Parravano	Maserati 150S	4	Oil pipe
DNF	118	S+2.0	(Italy) Luigi Musso	(Italy) Luigi Villoresi	Officine Alfieri Maserati	Maserati 300S	4	Rear axle
DNF	2	TS+1.3	(Italy) Nicola Musmeci	(Italy) Alessandro Perrone		Alfa Romeo 1900 TI	2	DNF
DNF	14	TS+1.3	(France) Charles de Cortanze	(Belgium) ”Eldé”		Peugeot 403	2	DNF
DNF	38	S1.1	(Italy) Ugo Mauthe	(Italy) Rosario Montalbano		Siata 1100 GT	2	DNF
DNF	44	S1.1	(Italy) Francesco de Roberto	(Italy) Pietro Fiordelisi		Stanguellini Bialbero	2	Accident
DNF	58	S1.1	(Italy) Francesco Siracusa	(Italy) Pasquale Placido		Stanguellini Bialbero	2	DNF
DNF	32	GT	(Italy) Vittorio Colocci	(Italy) Gioacchino Vari		Lancia Aurelia	1	DNF
DNF	80	S2.0	(United Kingdom) Mike Young	(United Kingdom) Geoff Richardson		Lotus-Connaught Mark VIII	1	Accident
DNF	90	S2.0	(Italy) Giovanni Bracco	(Italy) Franco Bordini	Officine Alfieri Maserati	Maserati 200S	1	Accident
DNS	8	TS+1.3	(Italy) Raffaello Matteucci	(Italy) Alfonso Thiele		Alfa Romeo 1900 TI		
DNS	18	GT	(Italy) Franco Bertani			Alfa Romeo Giulietta		
DNF	26	GT	(Italy) Natale Gotelli	(Italy) Bensi		Mercedes-Benz 300 SL		
DNS	34	GT	(Italy) Ignazio Consiglio	(Italy) Rocco Finoocchiaro		Fiat 8V		
DNS	46	S1.1	(Italy) Otello Biagiotti	(Italy) Piero Altini		Ermini-Fiat		
DNS	50	S1.1	(Italy) Mario Piccolo	(Italy) Giuseppe Sapienza		Giaur		
DNS	60	S1.5	(West Germany) Ernst Lautenschlager	(West Germany) Rudi Scholl		Porsche 550		
DNS	66	S1.5	(West Germany) Wolfgang Siedel			Osca MT4		
DNS	96	S2.0	(Italy) Azzurro Manzini			Maserati A6GCS		
DNS	98	S+2.0	(France) Hauret			Talbot Sport		
DNS	108	S+2.0	(Italy) Luigi Bordonaro	(Italy) Enrico Anselmi		Ferrari 750 Monza		
DNS	114	S+2.0	(Italy) Melchiorre Scaminaci	(Italy) Antonio di Salvo		Ferrari 750 Monza		

- Fastest Lap: Stirling Moss, 43:07.400secs (62.248 mph)

=== Class Winners ===
Class	Winners		
Sports +2000	104	Mercedes-Benz 300 SLR	Moss / Collins
Sports 2000	76	Maserati A6GCS	Manzini / Giardini
Sports 1500	64	Osca MT4 1500	Cabianca / Carini
Sports 1100	42	Osca MT4 1100	Rotolo / di Pasquale
Grand Touring	36	Fiat 8V Zagato	Arezzo / Alterio
Special Touring +1300	6	Fiat 8V Zagato	Zagato / Capelli

== Standings after the race ==
Pos	Championship	Points
1	(West Germany) Mercedes-Benz	24
2	(Italy) Ferrari	22 (23)
3	(United Kingdom) Jaguar	16
4	(Italy) Maserati	13 (15)
5	(United Kingdom) Aston Martin	9

- Note: Only the top five positions are included in this set of standings.

Championship points were awarded for the first six places in each race in the order of 8-6-4-3-2-1. Manufacturers were only awarded points for their highest finishing car with no points awarded for positions filled by additional cars. Only the best 4 results out of the 7 races could be retained by each manufacturer. Points earned but not counted towards the championship totals are listed within brackets in the above table.

World Sportscar Championship
Previous race: RAC Tourist Trophy	1955 season	Next race: 1000km Buenos Aires (1956)
