= 1955 World Sportscar Championship =

Racing tournament

Seasons
- ← 1954 1956 →

The 1955 World Sportscar Championship season was the third season of FIA World Sportscar Championship motor racing. It featured a series of six endurance races for sportscars, contested from 23 January to 16 October 1955.

The championship was won by Mercedes-Benz, the German manufacturer ending the dominance of Ferrari which had won both of the previous World Sportscar Championship titles.

== Season summary ==
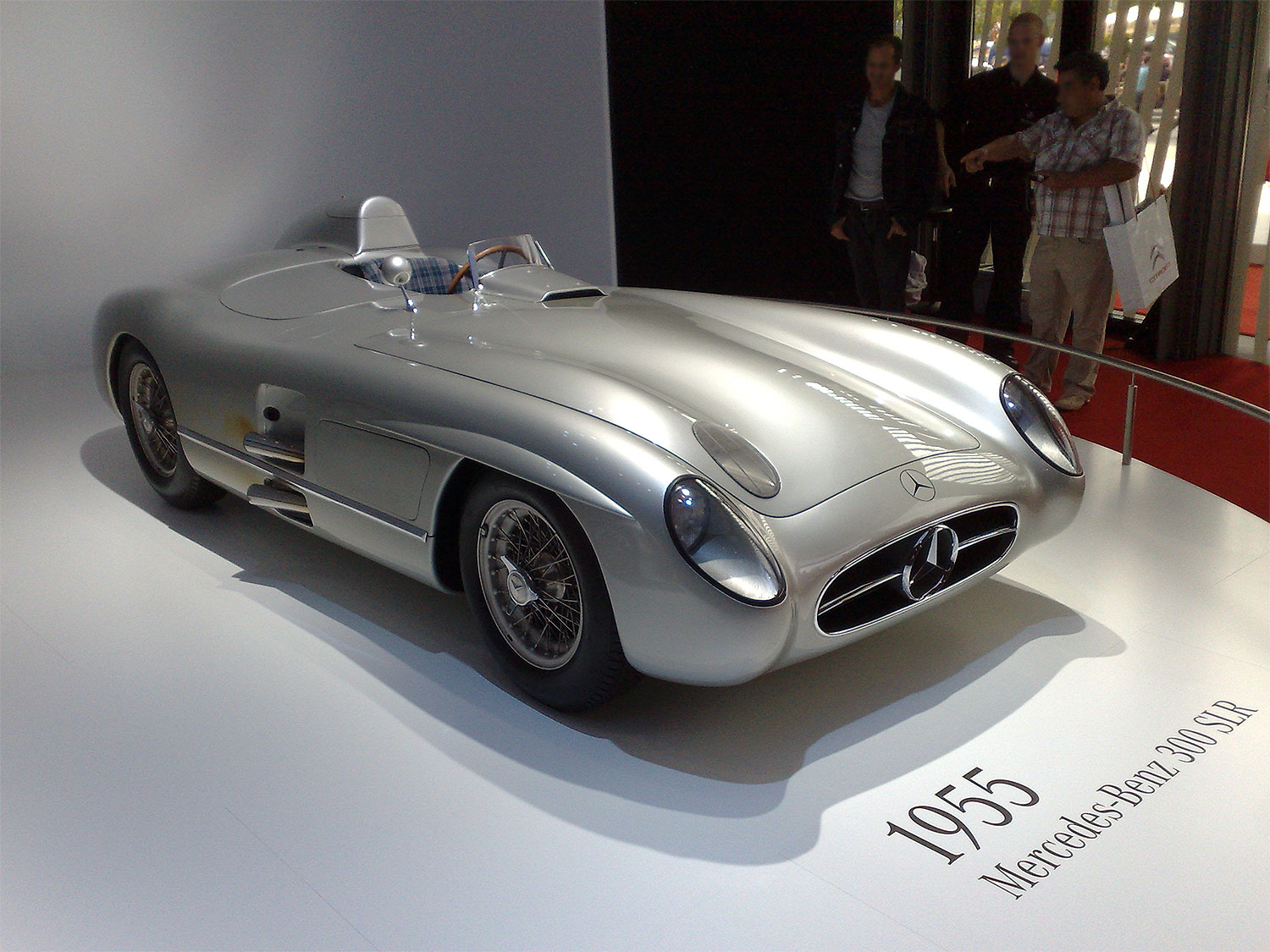
Mercedes-Benz won the championship with the 300 SLR

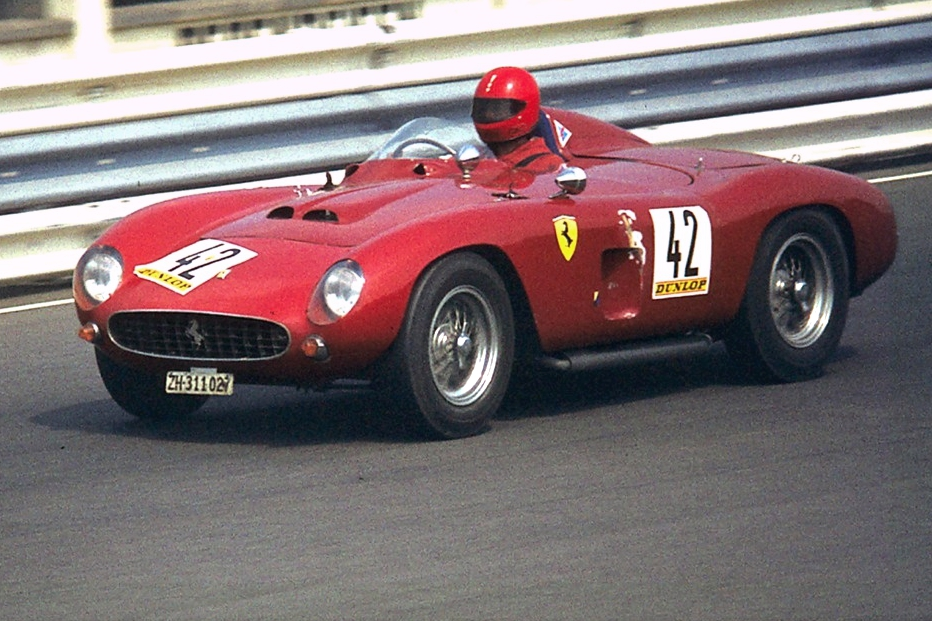
Ferrari placed second with the 750 Monza (pictured) and other models

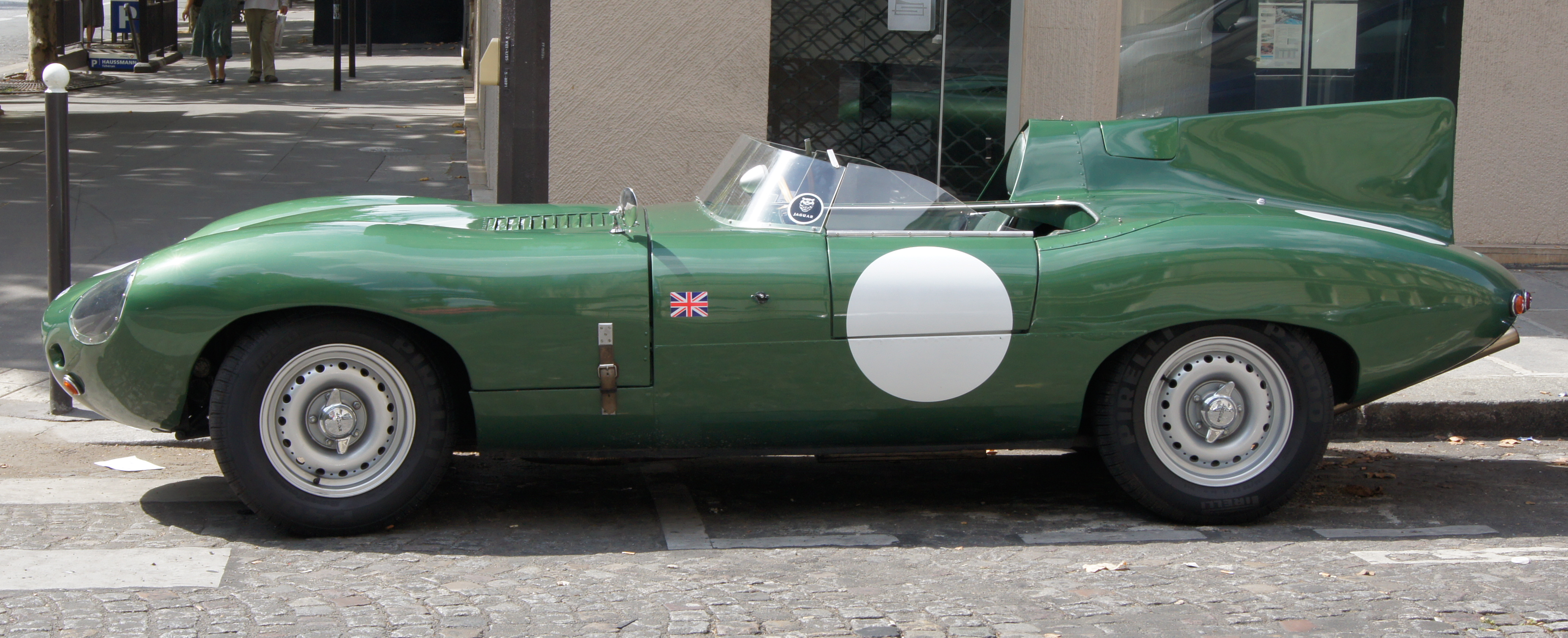
Jaguar placed third with the D-Type

The 1955 World Sports Car Championship was eventually contested over a six race series, even though seven were planned, of which two were cancelled. With legendary races such as the Mille Miglia and the RAC Tourist Trophy now part of an international race calendar, they were accompanied by the 24 Hours of Le Mans and 12 Hours of Sebring. The championship started in January, with a trip to Argentina for the 1955 1000 km Buenos Aires and ended with an event new to the championship, the legendary road race, the 1955 Targa Florio. As a result of the Le Mans disaster, both the 1000 km Nürburgring and the Carrera Panamericana were cancelled. The Nürburgring hosted a 500km race anyway, limited to 1500cc cars. Many Porsche 550 were entered, and even two East German EMW R3/55, with Edgar Barth among the drivers.

The Championship was open for manufacturers, with works teams such as Scuderia Ferrari, Officine Alfieri Maserati, Daimler-Benz and Jaguar Cars leading the way, but the majority of the fields were made up of amateur or gentlemen drivers, often up against professional racing drivers with experience in Formula One.

Classes were split between closed cars (GT) and open cars (Sports), with further divisions due to engine displacement. The 1955 season was a very bittersweet one for Daimler-Benz, with their Mercedes-Benz 300 SLRs. After missing the opening two, non-European rounds, which allowed Ferrari to gain a 14-point head start on Mercedes, the German team joined the championship. Aided by an English journalist, Denis Jenkinson, Stirling Moss would romp to victory in the Mille Miglia; however, the elation achieved by this English pairing and additional non-championship 1-2 win at the Nürburgring Eifelrennen would be quickly subdued at Le Mans a month later, when Pierre Levegh’s 300 SLR would be launched into the air and into the crowd, killing more than 80 spectators. Daimler-Benz would withdraw from the race, and motor sport altogether at the end of the season.

This difficult decision would be made a little easier when Moss, and John Fitch headed a 1-2-3 Mercedes victory at the Dundrod Circuit and the 1955 RAC Tourist Trophy. This race was marred by the deaths of three drivers. The victory put Mercedes back in the hunt for the championship. The last race of the season, the 1955 Targa Florio, would see Moss's car win again ahead of Fangio's, this time aided by Peter Collins, ensuring the manufacturers title (which was not yet awarded in F1) was won by the German marque.

== Season results ==
=== Race results ===
Date	Rd.	Event	Circuit / Location	Winning drivers	Winning team	Winning car	Results
23/01	1	(Argentina) 1000km Buenos Aires	Autódromo Mun. Avenida Paz	(Argentina) E. S. Valiente (Argentina) J.-M. Ibanez	—	(Italy) Ferrari 375 Plus	Results
13/03	2	(United States) 12 Hours of Sebring	Sebring Raceway	(United Kingdom) Mike Hawthorn (United States) Phil Walters	(United States) B. S. Cunningham	(United Kingdom) Jaguar D-Type	Results
01/05	3	(Italy) Mille Miglia	Brescia - Rome - Brescia	(United Kingdom) Stirling Moss (United Kingdom) D. Jenkinson	(West Germany) Daimler Benz AG	(West Germany) Mercedes-Benz 300 SLR	Results
11/06 12/06	4	(France) 24 Hours of Le Mans	Circuit des 24h	(United Kingdom) Mike Hawthorn (United Kingdom) Ivor Bueb	(United Kingdom) Jaguar Cars Ltd.	(United Kingdom) Jaguar D-Type	Results
~~28/08~~	~~5~~	~~(Germany) 1000km~~ 500km	Nürburgring	Jean Behra	Officine A. Maserati	(Italy) Maserati 150S	non-WC 1500cc
18/09	5	(United Kingdom) Tourist Trophy	Dundrod Circuit	(United Kingdom) Stirling Moss (United States) John Fitch	(West Germany) Daimler Benz AG	(West Germany) Mercedes-Benz 300 SLR	Results
16/10	6	(Italy) Targa Florio	Circuito Picc. delle Madonie	(United Kingdom) Stirling Moss (United Kingdom) Peter Collins	(West Germany) Daimler Benz AG	(West Germany) Mercedes-Benz 300 SLR	Results
~~Dec.~~	~~7~~	~~(Mexico) Carrera Panamericana~~	~~Pan-American Highway in Mexico~~	—	—	—	canc.

=== Championship standings ===
Pos	Manufacturer	(Argentina) BUE	(United States) SEB	(Italy) MMI	(France) LMS	(United Kingdom) TTR	(Italy) TGA	Total
1	(Germany) Mercedes-Benz			1^{8}	Ret	1^{8}	1^{8}	24
2	(Italy) Ferrari	1^{8}	2^{6}	3^{4}	Ret	6^{(1)}	3^{4}	22
3	(United Kingdom) Jaguar		1^{8}		1^{8}	Ret		16
4	(Italy) Maserati	3^{4}	3^{4}	4^{3}	Ret	5^{2}	5^{(2)}	13
5	(United Kingdom) Aston Martin			Ret	2^{6}	4^{3}		9
6	(Germany) Porsche	4^{3}	8	8	4^{3}	12		6
7	(France) Gordini	5^{2}						2
8	(United Kingdom) Austin-Healey		6^{1}	12	Ret			1

Note:

- Championship points were awarded for the first six places in each race in the order of 8-6-4-3-2-1.
- Manufacturers were awarded points only for their highest finishing car with no points awarded for positions filled by additional cars.
- Only the best 4 results out of the 6 races could be retained by each manufacturer. Points earned but not counted towards the championship totals are listed within brackets in the accompanying table.

== The cars ==
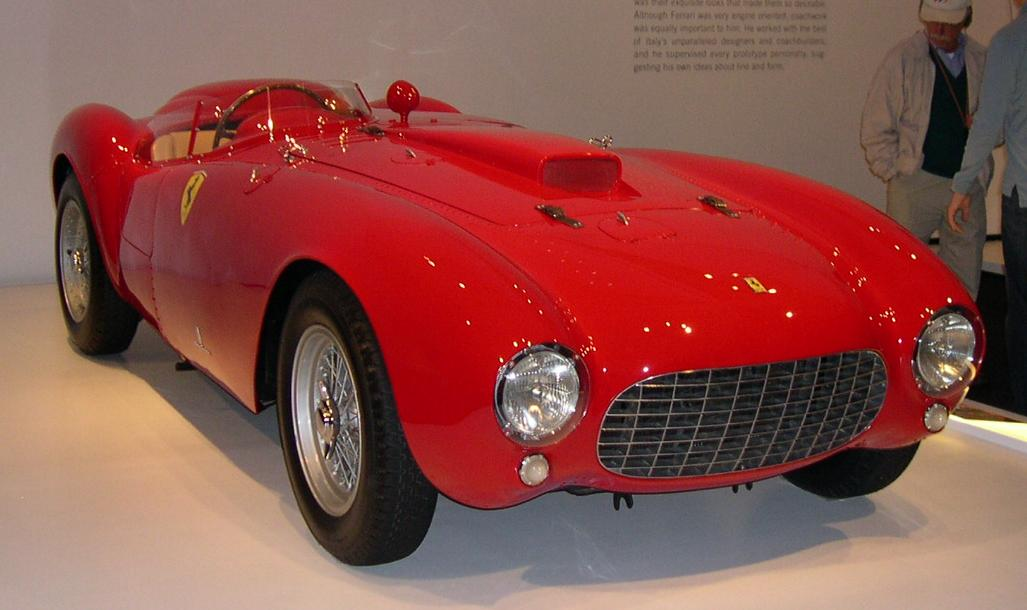
Ferrari placed second with the 375 Plus (pictured) and other models

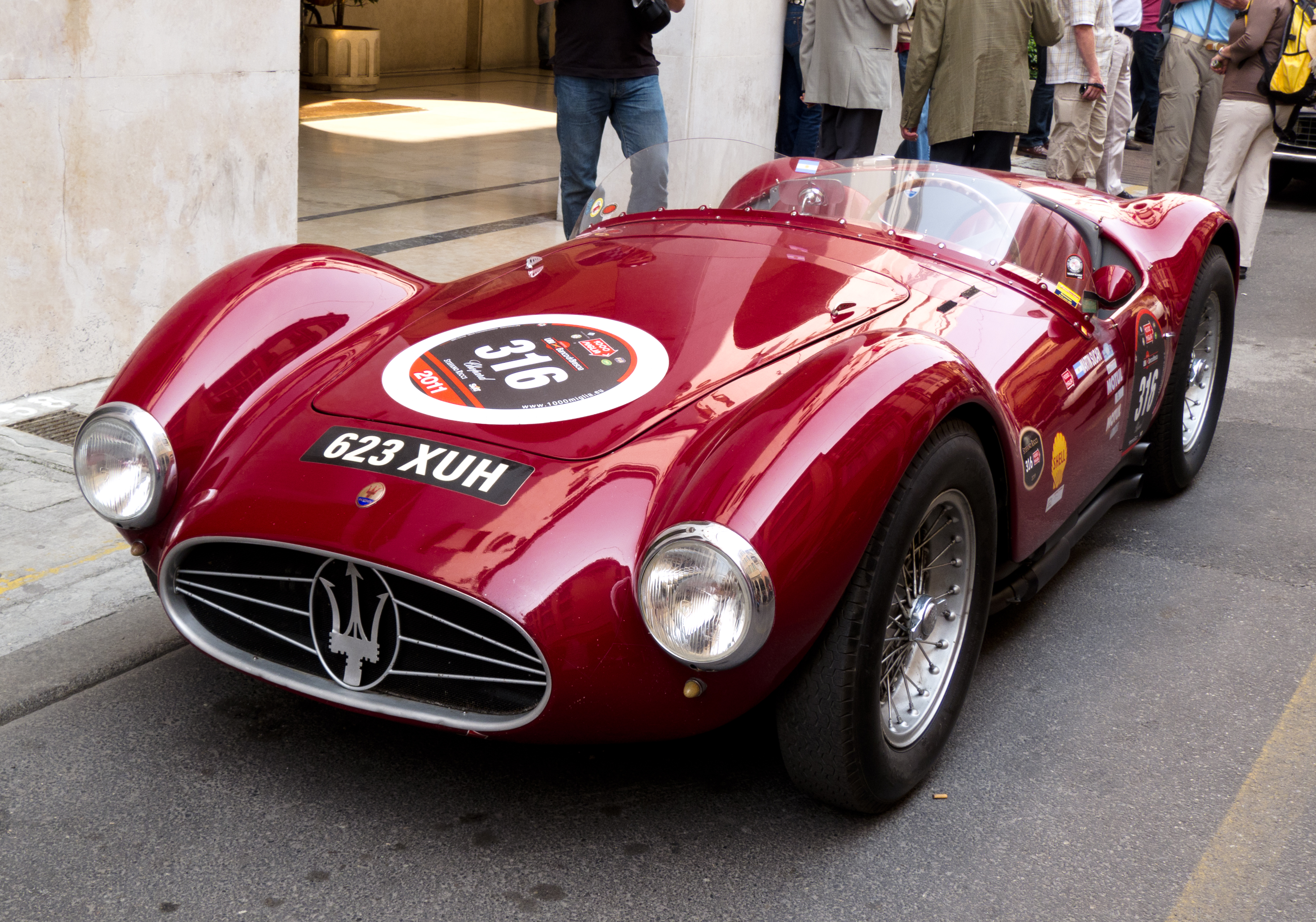
Maserati placed fourth with the A6GCS (pictured) & 300S

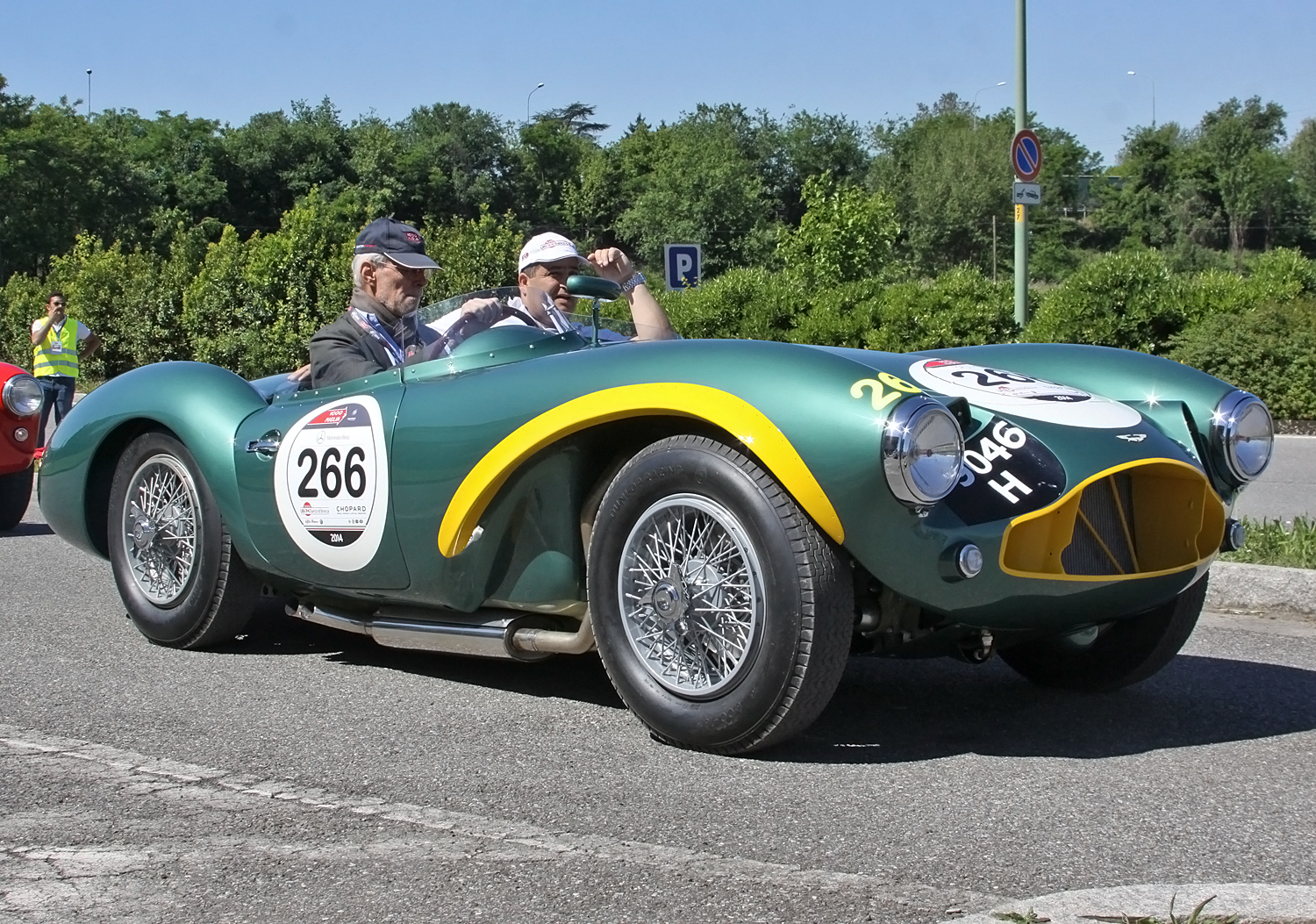
Aston Martin placed fifth with the DB3S

The following models contributed to the net championship point scores of their respective manufacturers.

- Mercedes-Benz 300 SLR
- Ferrari 375 Plus, Ferrari 750 Monza, Ferrari 857 S, Ferrari 376 S & Ferrari 735 LM
- Jaguar D-Type
- Maserati A6GCS & Maserati 300S
- Aston Martin DB3S
- Porsche 550 Spyder
- Gordini T24S
- Austin-Healey 100S
