= Mercedes-Benz 300 SLR =

1955 racing car

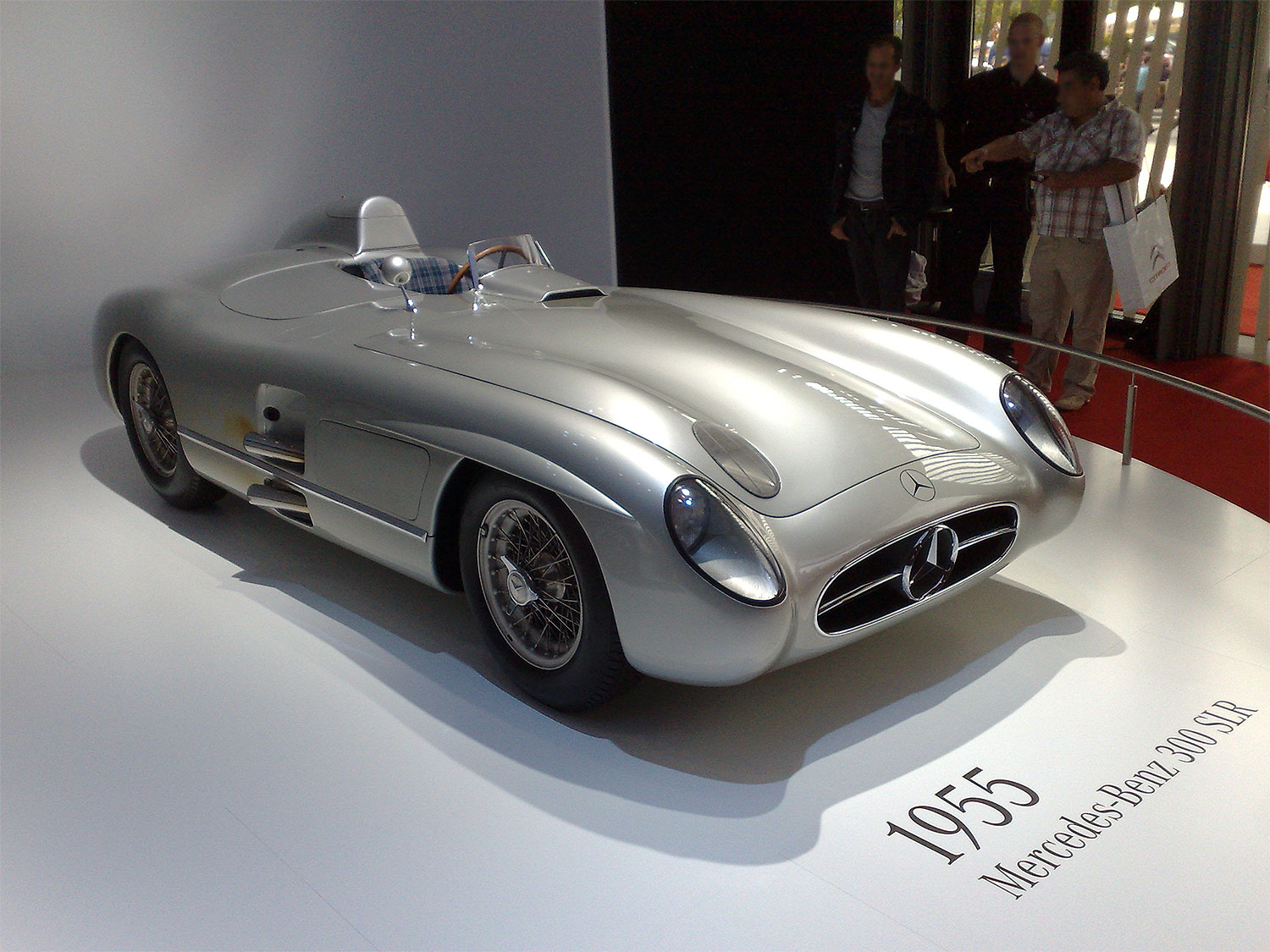
- Mercedes-Benz 300 SLR preserved at the Mercedes-Benz Museum
- Category: World Sportscar Championship
- Constructor: Daimler-Benz AG
- Designer: Rudolf Uhlenhaut

Technical specifications
- Suspension (front): Double wishbone, torsion bar springs, telescopic shock absorbers
- Suspension (rear): Single-joint swing axle, longitudinal torsion-bar springs, telescopic shock absorbers
- Engine: Mercedes-Benz M 196 S 2,982 cc (182 cu in) straight-8 naturally aspirated front-mid
- Transmission: Daimler-Benz 5-speed transaxle gearbox
- Fuel: Super petrol (98 RON)
- Tyres: Continental

Competition history
- Notable entrants: Mercedes-Benz
- Notable drivers: (Argentina) Juan Manuel Fangio (United Kingdom) Stirling Moss (France) Pierre Levegh
- Debut: 1955 Mille Miglia

The Mercedes-Benz 300 SLR (W 196 S) is a two-seat sports racing car that took part in the 1955 World Sportscar Championship before a catastrophic crash and fire at Le Mans later that year ended its domination prematurely. The car was designated "SL-R" (for Sport, Leicht, Rennen, eng: sport, light, racing), which was later condensed to "SLR". Technically, the W 196 S is based on the W 196 R, but has a slightly different engine, displacing 3 litres.

Just as the W 196 R Formula One racer's M 196 R engine, the 300 SLR's M 196 S engine is a direct-injected 3-litre straight-eight engine (but with a 78 mm bore and stroke); its rated power is 302 PS (222 kW).

The W 196 S's monoposto driving position was modified to standard two-abreast seating, headlights were added, and a few other changes made to adapt a strictly track competitor to a 24-hour road/track sports racer.

Hall of Fame Formula One driver and former Mercedes-Benz team 300 SLR race driver Stirling Moss described the 300 SLR as "The greatest sports racing car ever built – really an unbelievable machine."

Two of the nine 300 SLR rolling chassis produced (nicknamed the "Uhlenhaut Coupé") were built as closed coupés. Effectively road legal racers, they had coupé styling and gull-wing doors, superficially resembling the 300 SL production car.

When Mercedes-Benz cancelled its racing programme after the Le Mans disaster, the hybrid project was shelved. Company design chief Rudolf Uhlenhaut, architect of both the 300 SLR racer and the hybrids, appropriated one of the leftover mules as his personal car. Capable of approaching 290 km/h (180 mph), the Uhlenhaut Coupé was by far the fastest road car in the world in its day.

A 1955 Mercedes-Benz 300 SLR Uhlenhaut Coupé has become the most expensive car to ever be sold after being auctioned off for €135 million. The car, previously owned by Mercedes-Benz, was sold by RM Sotheby's to an unknown collector at the Mercedes-Benz Museum on 5 May 2022.

== History ==
=== Name ===
In spite of its name and strong resemblance to both the streamlined 1952 W194 Le Mans racer, and the iconic 1954 300SL Gullwing road car it spawned, 1955 300 SLR was not derived from either. Instead, it was based on the successful 2.5-litre straight-eight-powered 1954–1955 Mercedes-Benz W196 Formula One champion, with the engine enlarged to 3.0 litres for the sports car racing circuit and designated "SL-R" for Sport Leicht-Rennen (eng: Sport Light-Racing). All were the work of Daimler-Benz's design chief Rudolf Uhlenhaut.

=== Racing record ===
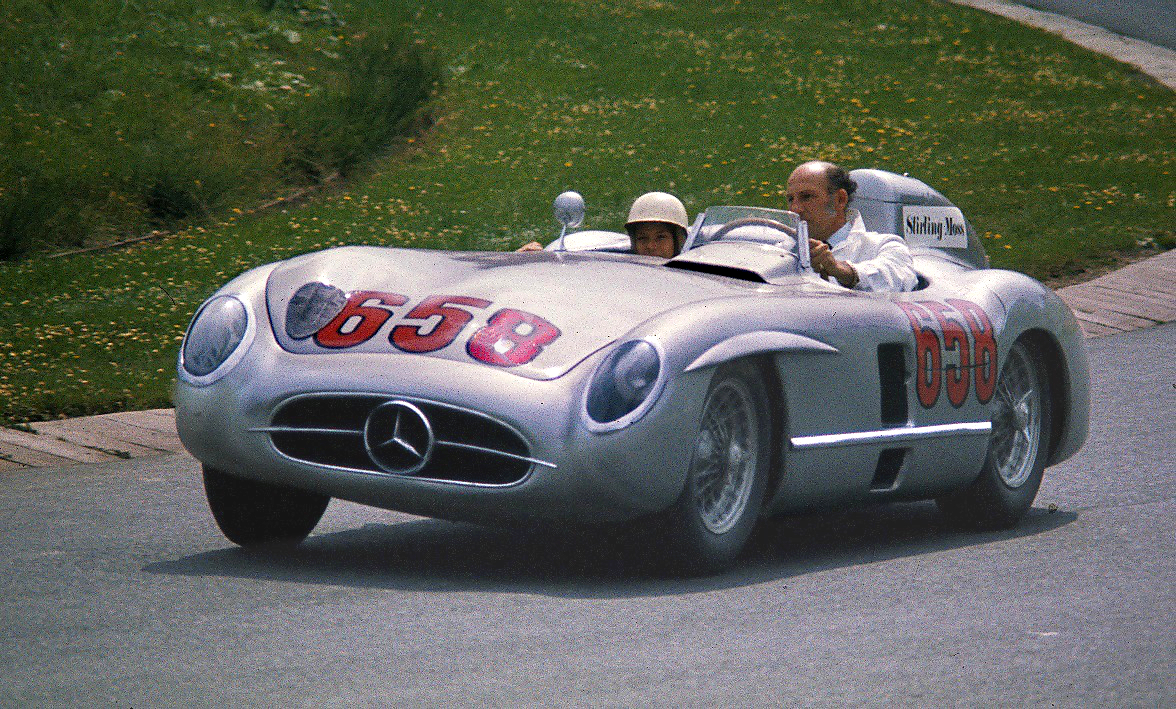
Stirling Moss drives the Mercedes-Benz 300 SLR of former Mercedes racing teammate Juan Manuel Fangio at the Nürburgring in 1977

In the 1955 World Sportscar Championship, only the best 4 results out of the 6 races would count, and most factory teams skipped the early overseas events. So did Mercedes as a Sports Car team, but not as a F1 team. The 16 January 1955 Argentine Grand Prix was won by defending World Champion Juan Manuel Fangio for Mercedes, suffering burns to his leg. As the new open top version of the 300 SLR open was not ready yet, its enlarged 3 litre straight-8 pump gas engine would be fitted into the single seater Mercedes-Benz W196 Formula 1 cars for the 30 January 1955 Buenos Aires Grand Prix Formula Libre race that was won by Fangio ahead of Moss.

In between, the 1955 1000 km Buenos Aires was won 1-2 by local Argentinians for Ferrari after the works entries were disqualified, and the Maserati in 3rd place won 4 points for the brand. The new 300 SLR was not entered in the 1955 12 Hours of Sebring in March, as the car was still not yet ready. After some controversy, a factory Jaguar won ahead of private Ferrari and Maserati.

After intense preparation of the Mercedes team for the 1955 Mille Miglia, driving the public roads several times in various types of cars, Mercedes team driver Stirling Moss won the 1955 Mille Miglia in a 300 SLR, setting the event record at an average of 157.650 km/h (97.96 mph) over 1,600 km (990 mi). He was assisted by navigator Denis Jenkinson, a British motor-racing journalist, who informed him with previously taken notes, like the pacenotes used by Mercedes at the 1952 Carrera and in modern rallying. Teammate Juan Manuel Fangio was second in a sister car. The German drivers did not finish as Kling crashed exiting Rome, and Hans Herrmann had a loose gas tank cap spilling fuel into the cockpit, leading to a crash in the mountains. Both Germans could not race for Mercedes at the 22 May 1955 Monaco Grand Prix, as Kling was not yet healthy, and Herrmann suffered season ending injuries in practise. André Simon had already been hired to race at Le Mans; he substituted for Kling at Monaco, and partnered with him for the 24h on the No. 21 car. Kling was back for the 29 May 1955 Eifelrennen at the Nürburgring which was won by Fangio and Moss in a dead race.

For the 1955 24 Hours of Le Mans, innovative wind-brakes were added to reduce fading of the inboard drum brakes, an idea that was already pioneered in 1952 but denied at the time. Neubauer put Fangio and Moss on the No. 19 car to prevent them from racing each other. John Fitch, an American who in 1952 had driven one of the Mercedes-Benz 300 SL in the Carrera Panamericana, was entered on the third Mercedes, No. 20. It was driven by Pierre Levegh when he got involved in the first pit stop attempted by Hawthorn in the disk brake Jaguar. He overtook the Austin-Healey of Lance Macklin, then braked hard, yet overshot his pits anyway. This caused the Austin-Healey to make an evasive move, and unlike Fangio, who was about to lap his team mate, Levegh could not prevent rear-ending the Austin-Healey coming into his way, launching his car into the air and into the spectator area. Upon impact, the ultra-lightweight Elektron bodywork's high magnesium content caused it to ignite and burn in the ensuing fuel fire. Compounding it, an uninformed race fire crew initially tried to extinguish the fire with water, only making it burn hotter. Eighty-three spectators and Levegh lost their lives in the 1955 Le Mans disaster which remains the highest-fatality accident in the history of motorsport. The leading 300 SLRs were withdrawn at night.

Among the championship races getting cancelled in summer of 1955 were also the July 1955 German Grand Prix and the late August 1955 1000km Nürburgring, which was reduced to a 500km race for 1500cc cars. To prepare for upcoming events that still took place, and needed to be won to win the championship, Mercedes entered another non-championship sportscar race, the 7 August 1955 Swedish Grand Prix, which again was a 1-2 Fangio-Moss win precession like the Eifelrennen. Rudolf Uhlenhaut drove a 300 SLR Gullwing Coupé to this event, and did practise laps in it.

In September, the 300 SLRs scored a decisive 1–2–3 finish in the Tourist Trophy at Dundrod, Ireland. This was only its second championship race win, but 2nd and 3rd place were significant, too, as they denied points to the competition, and opened up the opportunity to win the championship in Sicily, as the 1955 Targa Florio replaced the cancelled Carrera Panamericana. Thus it was run four weeks after Dundrod in October, not as usual in May, and as a one-off second Italian WC round only in 1955. From 1958 the Targa replaced the Mille Miglia. The break gave teams time to travel and to prepare for the new, challenging mountain course.

After some more intense practise on the island, the factory drivers learned the challenging course. The three SLR scored a 1–2-4 Targa win, Moss's battered car ahead of Fangio's, with the 3rd SLR beaten by a Ferrari that attacked in vain. The result earned Mercedes also the World Sportscars Championship, with two points ahead of Ferrari which never had won both championships, F1 and sportscars, in the same year yet (in 1953 F1 was contested with F2 cars).

In total, the 300 SLR had an impressive record as it won five of six races, two of them non-WC, and was withdrawn from the sixth race while leading after 1800 km in 10 hours.

As decided earlier, Mercedes terminated its motorsport programme at the end of the 1955 season, having proven that it could win in both World Championship categories. The company would stay away from major racing for the next three decades, concentrating on road cars, new factories and methods etc.

=== Uhlenhaut Coupé ===
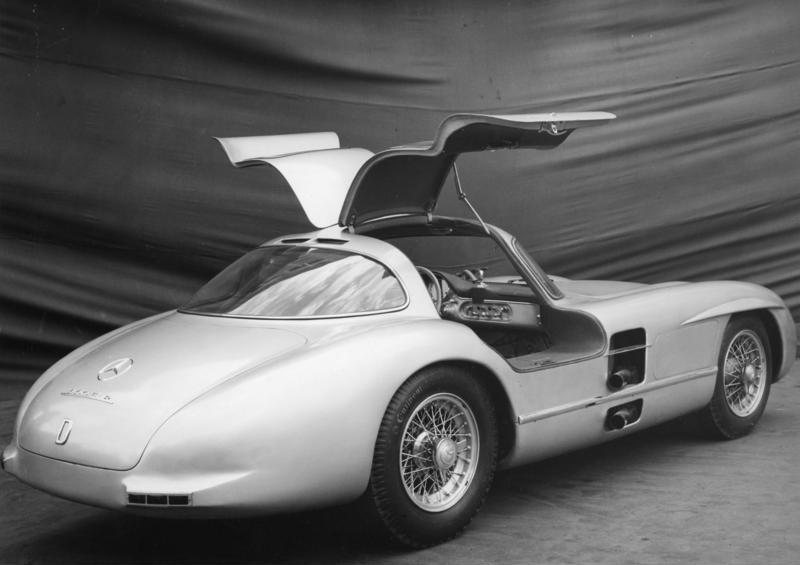
Gull-wing doors and side pipes were signature features of the Uhlenhaut Coupé

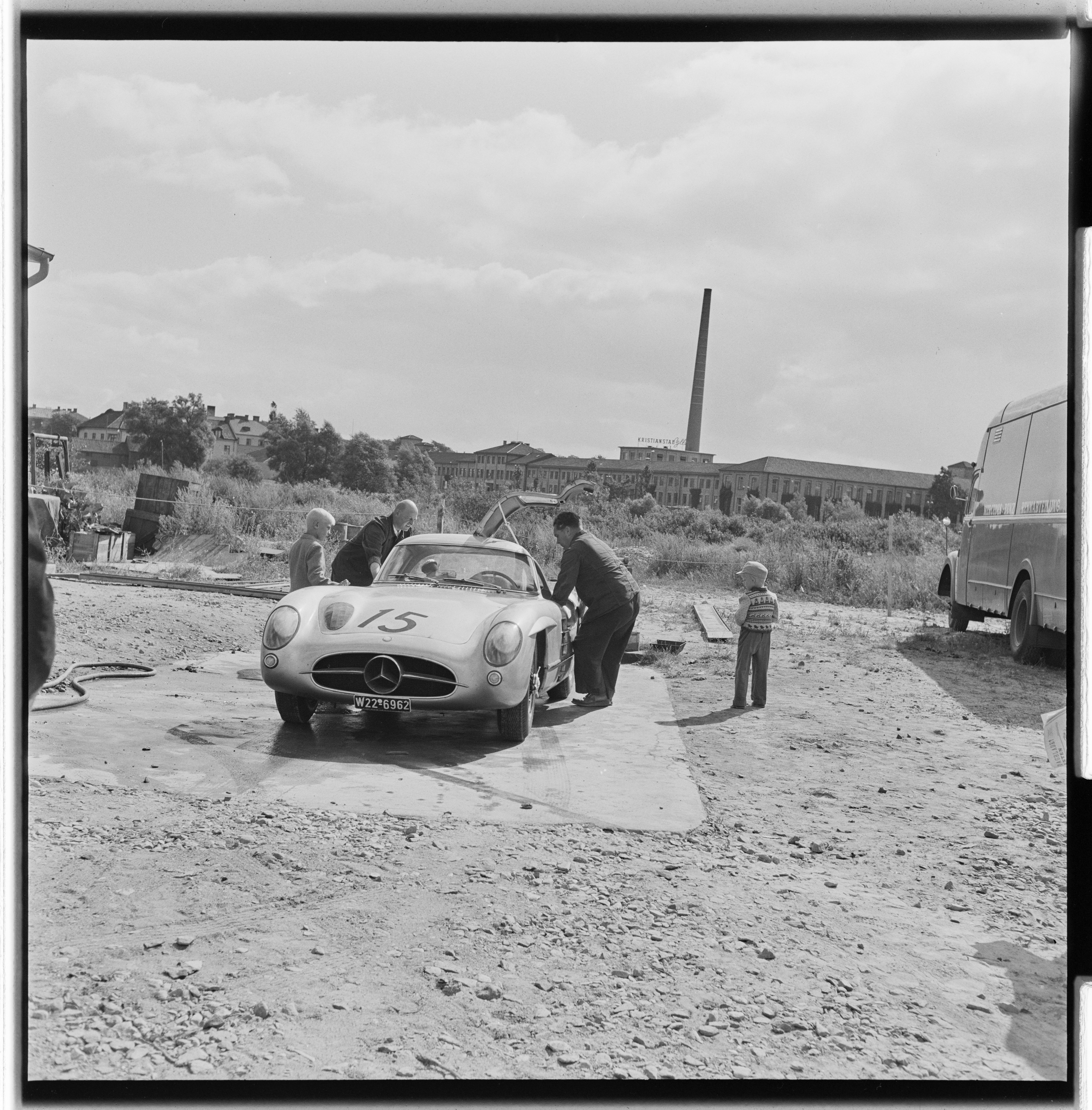
Uhlenhaut Coupé with No. 15 in Sweden

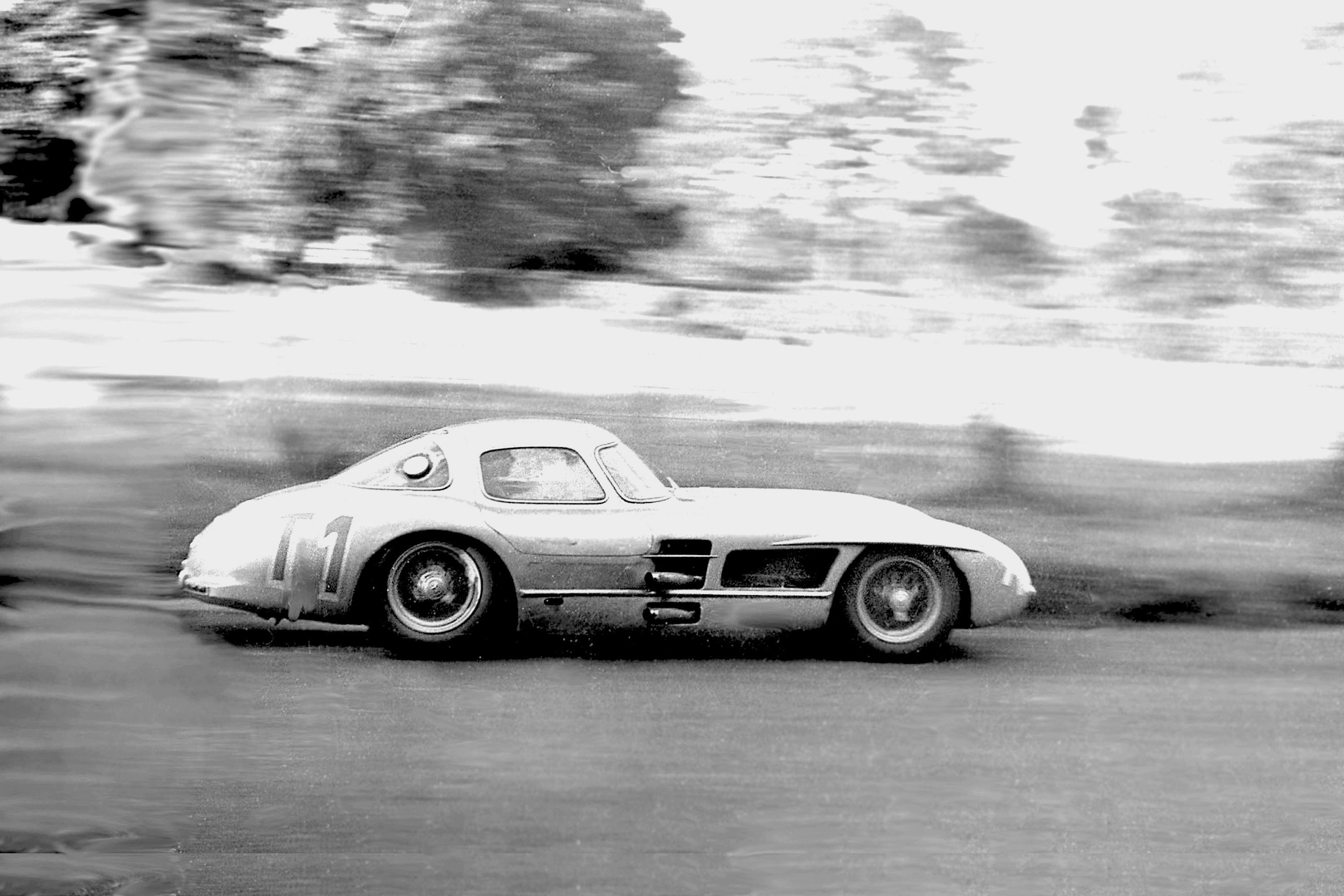
Uhlenhaut Coupé practising with No. T1 at RAC TT Dundrod

Daimler-Benz made two road-legal 300 SLR coupés, known today as Uhlenhaut Coupé. One of these two cars once served as the personal car of its designer, Daimler-Benz motorsport chief Rudolf Uhlenhaut, hence the name.

Prior to the Le Mans accident he had ordered two of the nine W196 chassis built to be set aside for modification into an SLR/SL hybrid. The resulting coupé featured a significantly more sculpted body than the 300 SL fitted over a slightly widened version of the SLR's chassis, with signature gull-wing doors still needed to clear its spaceframe's high sill beams. These were intended to race in the Carrera Panamericana which was cancelled because of safety concerns following the Le Mans disaster.

Before the project could be seen through, however, Mercedes announced a planned withdrawal from competitive motorsport at the end of 1955, in the works even before Le Mans. The hybrid program was abandoned, leaving Uhlenhaut to appropriate one of the leftover mules as a company car with only a large suitcase-sized muffler added to dampen its near-unsilenced exhaust pipes.

With a maximum speed approaching 290 km/h (180 mph), the 300 SLR Uhlenhaut Coupé easily earned the reputation of being the era's fastest road car. A story circulates that, running late for a meeting, Uhlenhaut drove up the autobahn from Munich to Stuttgart in just over an hour, a 220-kilometre (137 mi) journey that today takes two-and-a-half hours.

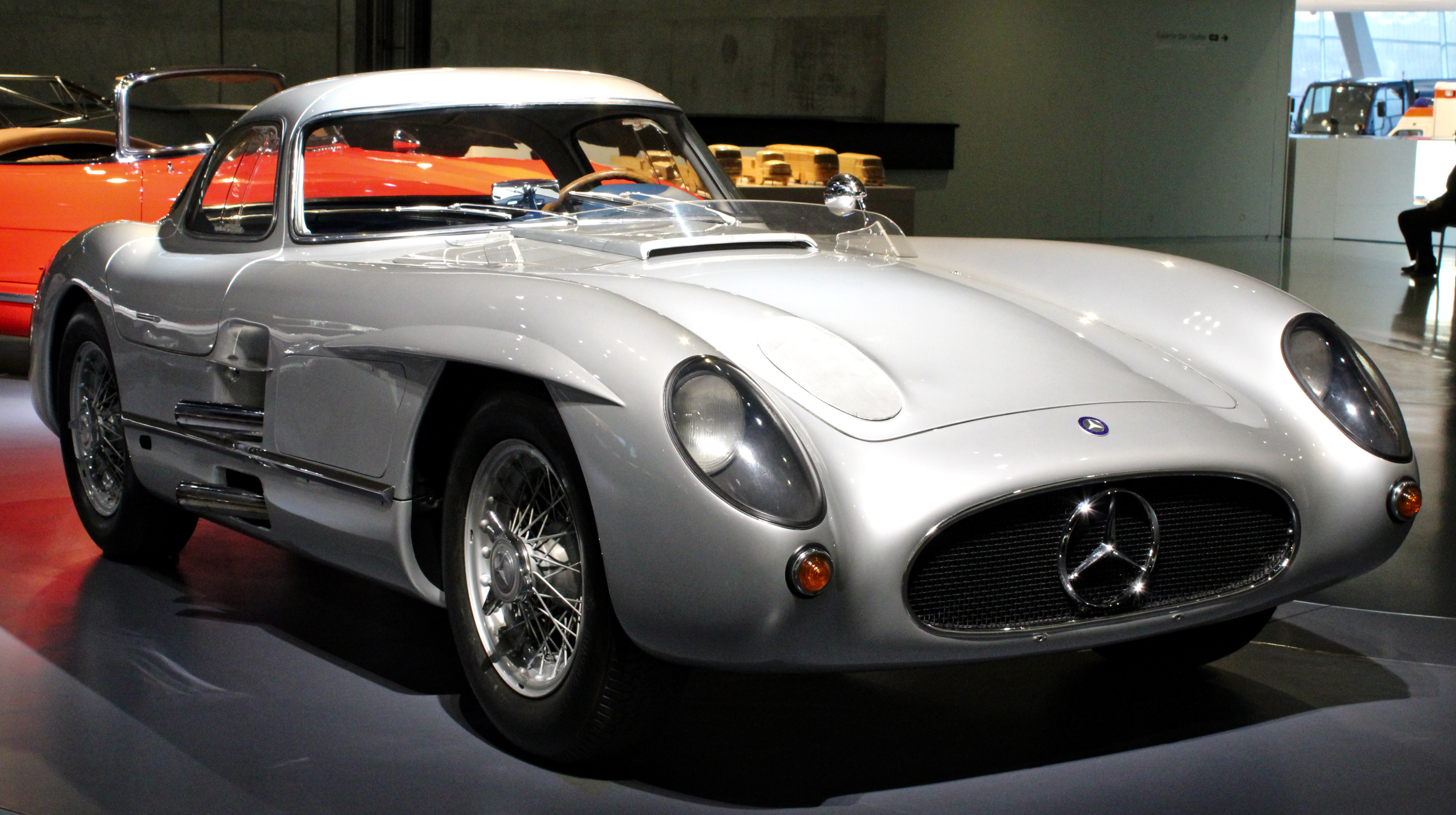
Uhlenhaut's 300 SLR coupé, in the Mercedes-Benz museum in Stuttgart

US auto enthusiast magazine Motor Trend road tested the car, as did two English journalists from Automobile Revue, who spent more than 2,000 miles (3,200 km) behind its wheel. After a high-speed session at four o'clock in the morning on an empty section of autobahn outside Munich the latter wrote: "We are driving a car which barely takes a second to overtake the rest of the traffic and for which 120 mph on a quiet motorway is little more than walking pace. With its unflappable handling through corners, it treats the laws of centrifugal force with apparent disdain."

Their only regret was that "we will never be able to buy [the car], which the average driver would never buy anyway."

One Uhlenhaut Coupé has been preserved by Mercedes-Benz Museum. Its only sibling was sold from the museum in May 2022 to a private collector for €135 million (£114 million or US$142 million) with the proceeds used to establish the Mercedes-Benz Fund. The price was the highest ever paid for a car, either at private sale or public auction, surpassing the previous record of $75 million (€69 million) for a Ferrari 250 GTO.

== Technical description ==
=== Design ===
The 300 SLR was front mid-engined, with its long longitudinally mounted engine placed just behind the front axle to better balance front/rear weight distribution. A brazed steel tube spaceframe chassis carried ultra-light Elektron magnesium-alloy bodywork (having a relative density of 1.8, less than a quarter of iron's 7.8), which contributed substantially to the low vehicle mass of 901 kg (1,986 lb) for the roadster, 1,117 kg (2,463 lb) in the case of the coupé.

The SLR had a second seat for a co-driver, mechanic, or navigator, depending on the race. As it turned out, this was only needed during the Mille Miglia, as the 1955 Carrera Panamericana was cancelled due to the 1955 Le Mans accident. On some circuits such as the Targa Florio the extra seat was covered and passenger windshield removed to improve aerodynamics. The front windshield for the two-seater mode was originally steeply raked, but due to intense turbulence in the cabin this was redesigned repeatedly during testing at Hockenheim before Mille Miglia. Jenkinson used the long curls of his trademark beard as flow visualisation aids. Thus evaluated, the final design used at Mille Miglia ended up being near vertical.

A total of nine W 196 S chassis were built: seven roadsters, and two coupés. Work was ongoing on an updated design for 1956 when Mercedes-Benz abruptly announced their withdrawal from all forms of motorsport following the Le Mans tragedy. The front suspension, the engine, and the brakes were being redesigned for this cancelled project; in parallel with the Uhlenhaut Coupés a coupé version had also been under development, with the aim of once again winning the Carrera Panamericana.

=== Engine ===
The M 196 S engine is a naturally aspirated straight-eight engine with a bore and stroke of 78.0 mm (3 in), resulting in a displacement of 2,982 cc (182 cu in). The engine has a peak power output of 310 PS (228 kW) at 7400 rpm, with maximum sustained power of 276 PS (203 kW) at 7000 rpm. Its maximum torque is 31.7 kp⋅m (311 N⋅m) at 5950 rpm, giving the engine a very high BMEP of 1.31 MPa (190 lbf/in^{2}). Like in the W 196 R, the engine was canted to the right at 53 degrees to lower the car's profile, resulting in slicker aerodynamics and a distinctive bulge on the passenger side of the hood shared with the streamlined Type Monza Formula one car. To reduce crankshaft torsion, power takeoff was from the centre of the engine via a gear rather than at the end of the crankshaft. Daimler-Benz fitted the engine with a single desmodromic intake valve, and a single desmodromic exhaust valve per cylinder, actuated by two spur-gear driven overhead camshafts. The fuel system is a direct fuel injection system with a mechanically driven eight-plunger inline injection pump made by Bosch. In addition to that, the W 196 S's engine was fitted with a dry-sump lubrication system and chromium-coated aluminium cylinder sleeves. For ignition, the engine was equipped with conventional double magnetos. Unlike the M 196 R engine, the M 196 S engine is designed to run on standardised, commercially available Super 98 RON petrol (DIN 51600).

=== Suspension system ===
To enhance stopping power extra wide diameter drum brakes too large to fit inside 16" wheel rims were used, mounted inboard with short half shafts and two universal joints per wheel. Suspension was four-wheel independent. Torsion bars fitted inside the frame's tubes were used in the double wishbone front. To prevent cornering forces from raising the car, as occurs with short swing axles, the rear used a low-roll centre system featuring off-centred beams spanning from each hub to the opposite side of the chassis crossing one-another over the centreline. Nevertheless, snap-oversteer could be still a notable problem at speed.

At Le Mans in 1955, the 300 SLRs were also equipped with a large rear mounted "wind brake" that hinged up above the rear deck to slow the cars at the end of the fast straights. The idea came from director of motorsports Alfred Neubauer, who had been seeking to reduce wear on the huge drum brakes and tyres during long-distance endurance races where cars repeatedly had to decelerate from 180 mph (290 km/h) to as little as 25 mph. In tests the 0.7 m^{2} (7.5 sq ft) light-alloy spoiler slowed the car dramatically and improved cornering, helping to compensate for the superior new disc brakes of the SLR's main rival Jaguar D-type.

== SLR McLaren ==
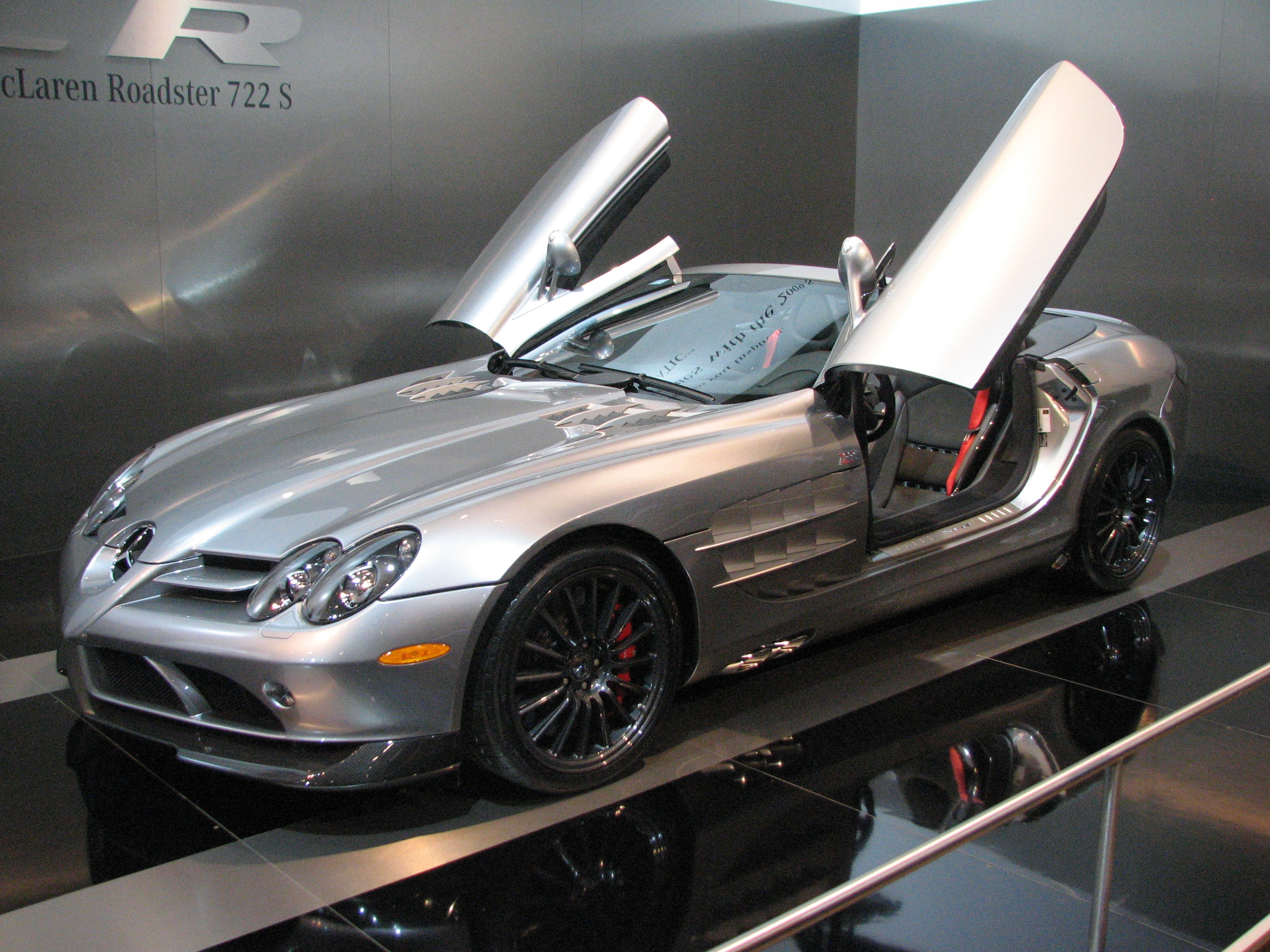
Mercedes-Benz SLR McLaren

Inspired by the 300 SLR Uhlenhaut Coupé, the Mercedes-Benz SLR McLaren grand tourer made its debut in 2003. Jointly developed by Mercedes-Benz and McLaren Automotive it featured a hand-built 5.4-litre, supercharged 626 PS (460 kW; 617 hp) all-aluminium V8 engine.

The SLR McLaren was available in both coupé and roadster versions, as well as a number of other specialised variants. Production ran through early 2010.

== See also ==
- Mercedes-Benz W196
- Mercedes-Benz SLR McLaren
- Mercedes-Benz in motorsport
- List of Mercedes-Benz cars
