= Honda RA108 =

Formula One racing car

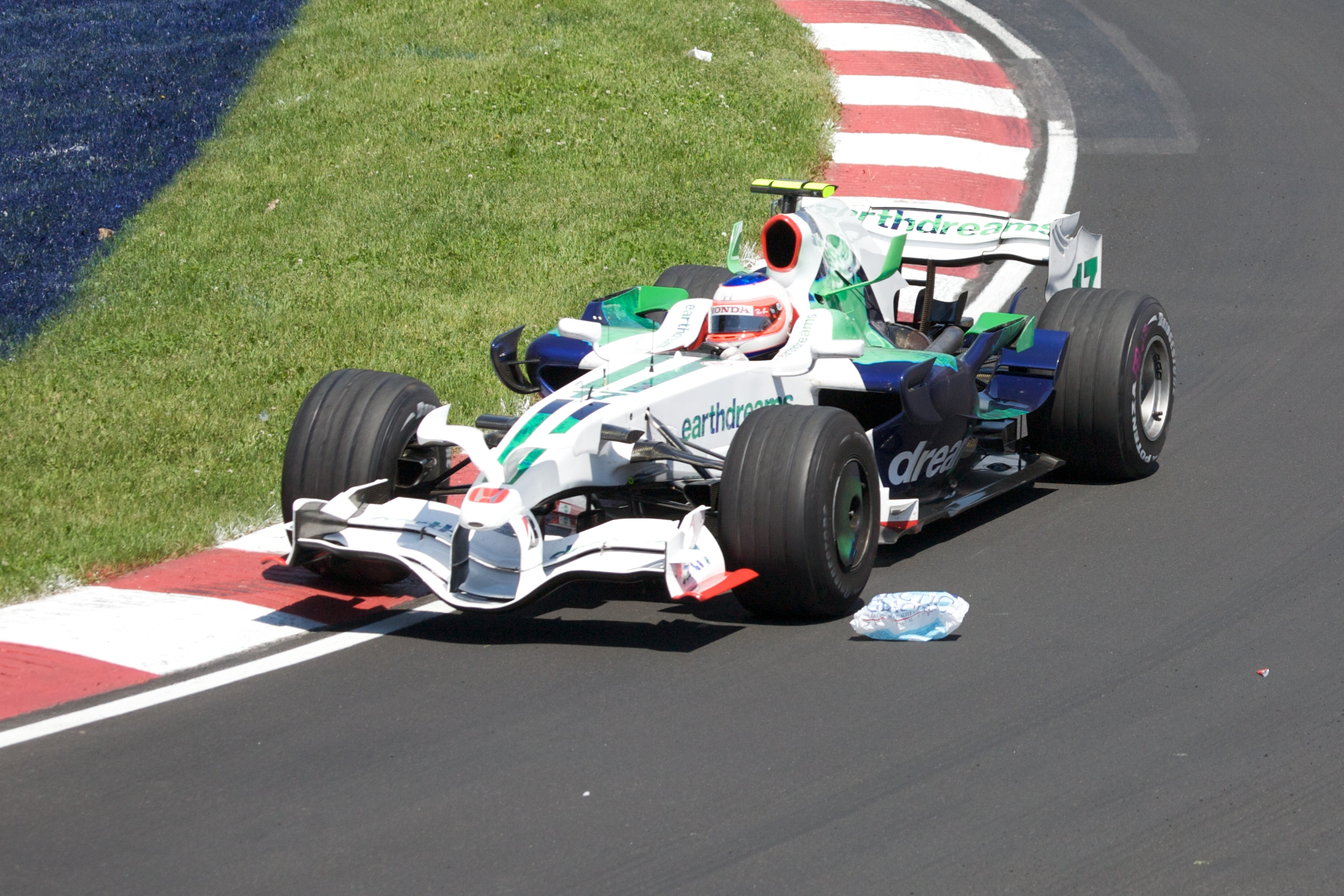
- Rubens Barrichello driving the RA108 at the 2008 Canadian Grand Prix
- Category: Formula One
- Constructor: Honda
- Designers: Shuhei Nakamoto (Technical Director); Jörg Zander (Deputy Technical Director); Jacky Eeckelaert (Engineering Director); Kevin Taylor (Chief Designer); Craig Wilson (Head of Vehicle Engineering); Ian Wright (Chief Engineer, Vehicle Dynamics); Russell Cooley (Chief Engineer, Transmission and Mechanical); Loic Bigois (Head of Aerodynamics); Kazuo Sakurahara (Engine Project Leader)
- Predecessor: RA107
- Successor: Brawn BGP 001

Technical specifications
- Chassis: Moulded carbon fibre and honeycomb composite monocoque
- Suspension (front): Double wishbone with pushrod-activated torsion springs and rockers, Showa dampers
- Suspension (rear): Double wishbone with pushrod-activated torsion springs and rockers, Showa dampers
- Engine: Honda RA808E 2.4 L (150 cu in) 90° V8, 19,000 RPM rev limited Naturally-aspirated, mid-engined
- Transmission: Honda Carbon composite maincase, 7-speed, Honda internals Sequential semi-automatic hydraulic activation
- Power: 747-775 hp @ 19,000 rpm
- Fuel: ? (5.75% bio fuel)
- Lubricants: ENEOS
- Tyres: Bridgestone Potenza; BBS Forged Magnesium Wheels

Competition history
- Notable entrants: Honda Racing F1 Team
- Notable drivers: 16. (United Kingdom) Jenson Button; 17. (Brazil) Rubens Barrichello
- Debut: 2008 Australian Grand Prix
- Last event: 2008 Brazilian Grand Prix
Races	Wins	Podiums	Poles	F/Laps
18	0	1	0	0

The Honda RA108 was the Formula One racing car with which Honda Racing F1 contested the 2008 Formula One season.

Following the departure of Honda from the sport at the end of 2008 and the sale of the team to team principal Ross Brawn in 2009, the RA108 was the last car produced by the Brackley-based team to bear the Honda name and the last Formula One car powered by a Honda engine until 2015, when Honda re-entered the sport as an engine supplier to power the McLaren MP4-30.

== Launch ==
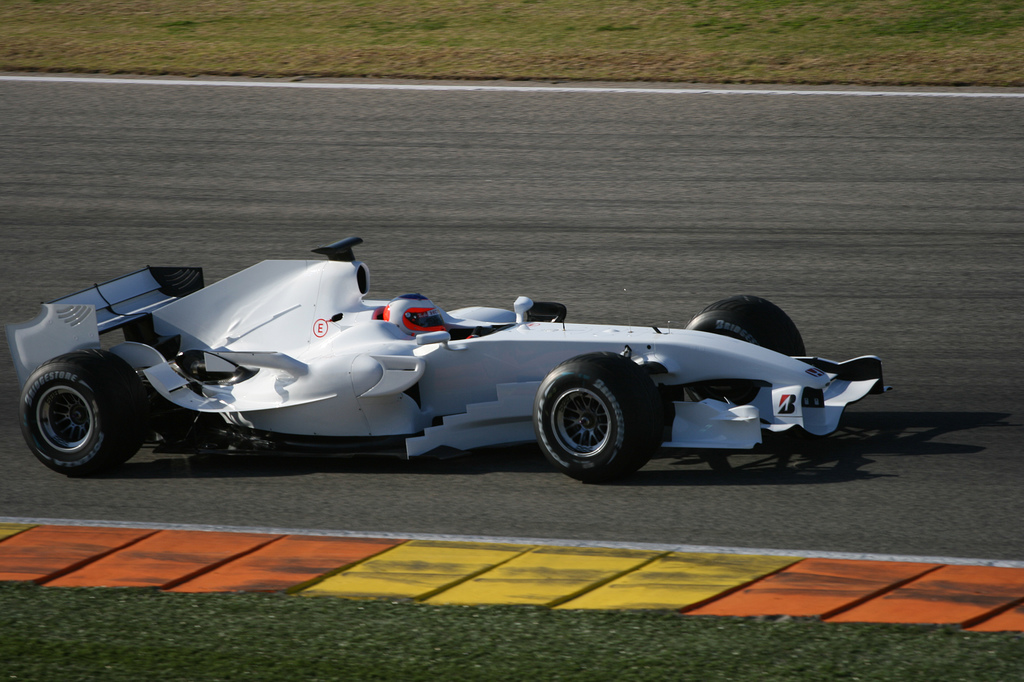
An RA108 driven by Rubens Barrichello at Valencia, January 23rd 2008.

The car was unveiled at a test in Valencia on 23 January 2008, a week before the car's official launch, driven by Rubens Barrichello. The car was officially unveiled at the team's operational headquarters in Brackley, England.

For the 2008 season, the Honda F1 team named Ross Brawn as team principal and also announced a new deputy technical director in the form of former BMW Sauber chief designer Jörg Zander.

For the 2008 season, the team retained their drivers from the previous two seasons, Jenson Button and Rubens Barrichello. Honda also recruited Alexander Wurz from Williams, although the veteran Austrian had announced his retirement from race driving in 2007, but Wurz could not turn down the prospect of working alongside Ross Brawn. Honda also confirmed that their young driver line up will include 2006 British Formula 3 Champion Mike Conway and Italian Luca Filippi.

== 2008 season ==
=== Testing ===
The RA108 had been a constant mid to rear end car in 2008 testing with Jenson Button saying the car lacked "driveability" as the drivers and team adapted the RA108 to new rules. For the 2008 season, the FIA implemented rules that required all teams to use one gearbox for four races and a standard McLaren Electronic Systems ECU that prevents the use of driving aids such as traction control and engine braking. Ross Brawn had already said the team had a better chance for the 2009 Formula One season as the regulations for 2009 would be totally new.

Button commented on how positively the team developed the RA108. At their final week of testing at the Jerez Circuit in Spain, the team added new aerodynamics, with most of the wings being revised. Head of Race and Test Engineering, Steve Clark, believed the car was a clear step forward.

In the testing in Paul Ricard before the Monaco Grand Prix, a second revision of the "dumbo" wings on the nose, first introduced in the Spanish Grand Prix, was introduced. From the Hungarian Grand Prix onwards, both cars had a shark fin attached to the engine cover.

== Sponsorship and livery ==
During the pre-season testing, the car only ran in white livery without sponsors. When it was unveiled to the media, once again it featured an image of planet Earth but with subtle changes including stripes on the front of the car and red accents to raise the Earth Dreams campaign. It also retaining the Type R emblem on the nosecone.

At the Turkish Grand Prix, Barrichello's car was decorated with a special livery commemorating his 257th race start, which broke the record that previously held by Riccardo Patrese.

== Later use ==
After the end of 2008 season, the RA108 was fitted with a 2009-specification front wing and KERS system. Later, it was used as a show car with a livery of the Brawn BGP001, followed by the Mercedes W01 and W02 respectively.

In 2014, the RA108 was used as a pit stop challenge car with the rear wing and monoblock wheels from the Mercedes W05.

== Gallery ==
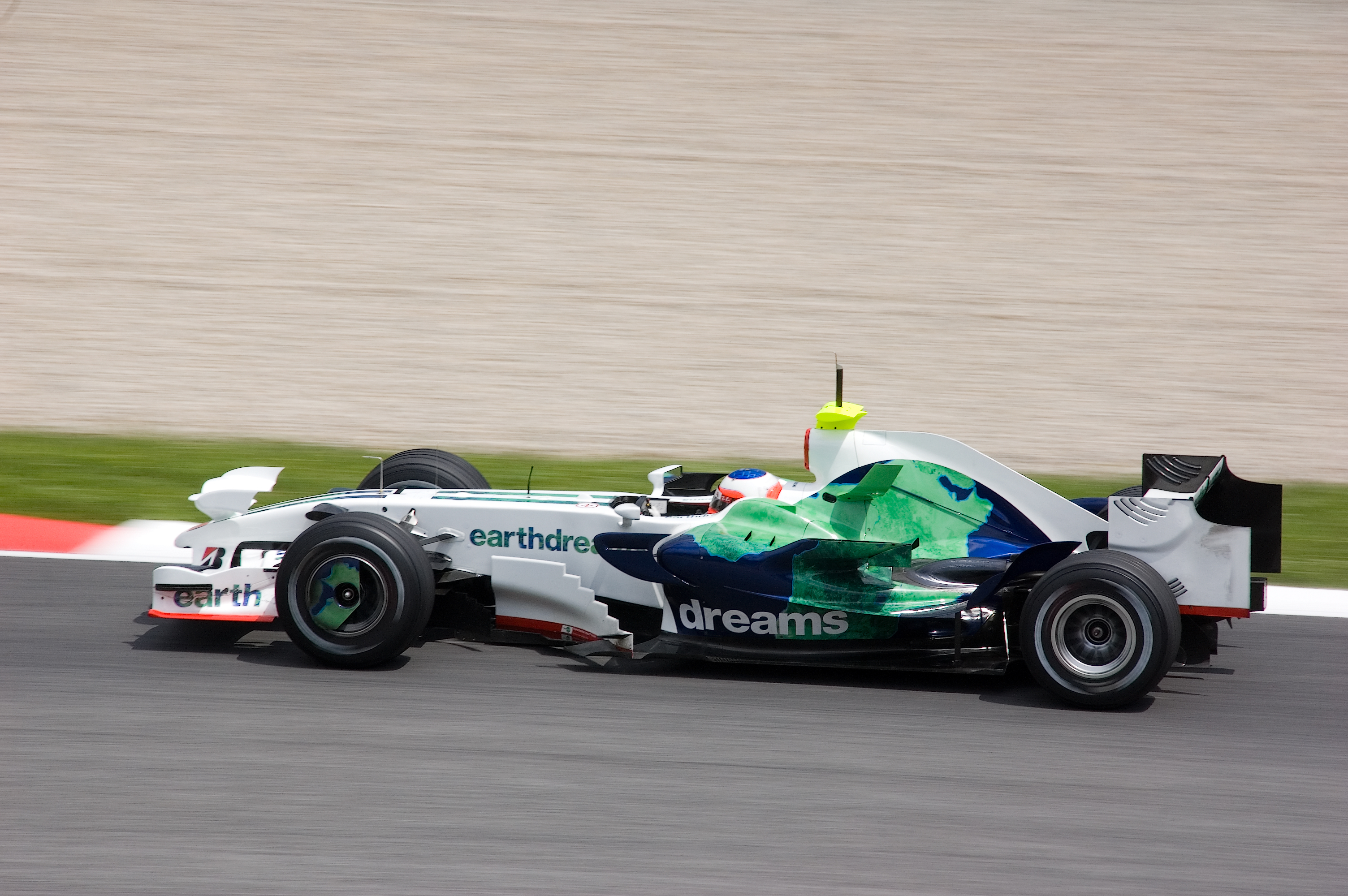
Rubens Barrichello driving the RA108 during a test.

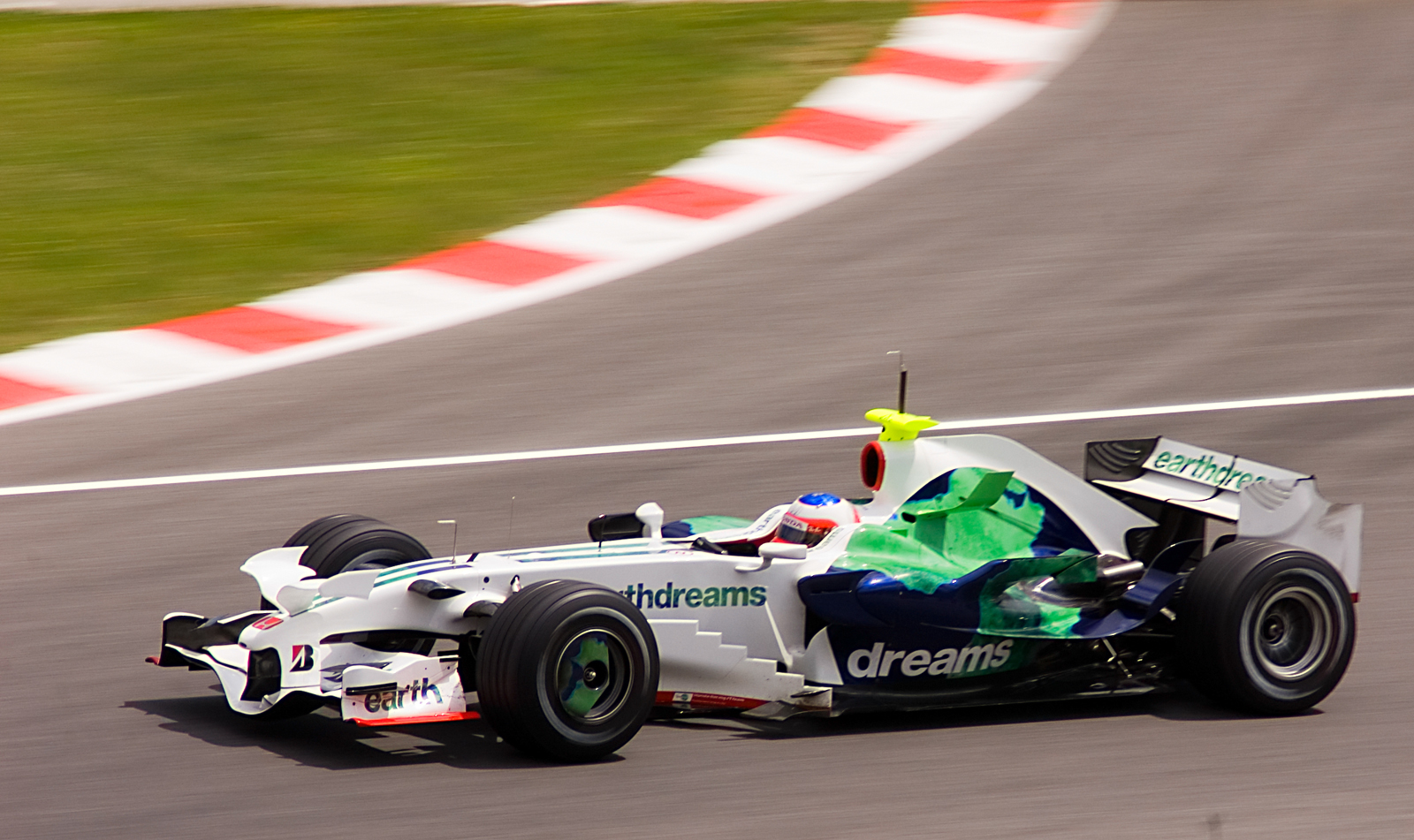
Front-left view of the car.

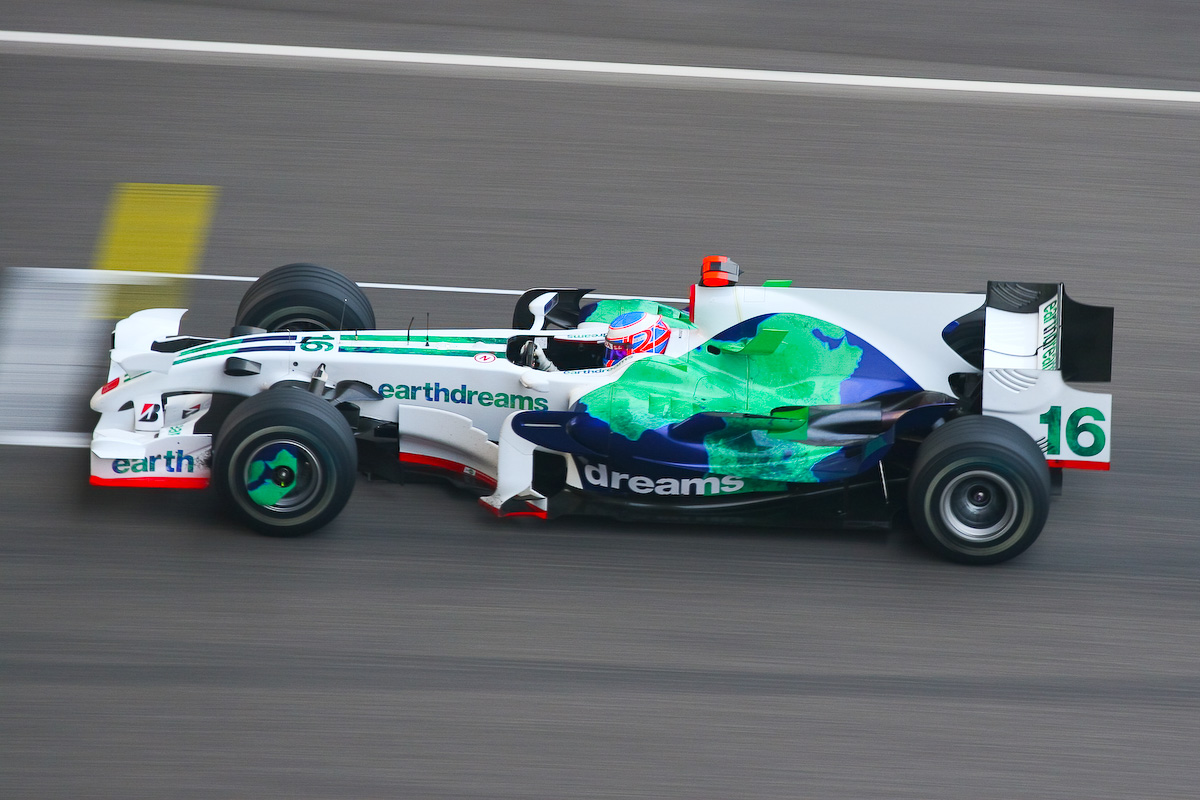
Jenson Button driving the RA108 at the 2008 Chinese Grand Prix.

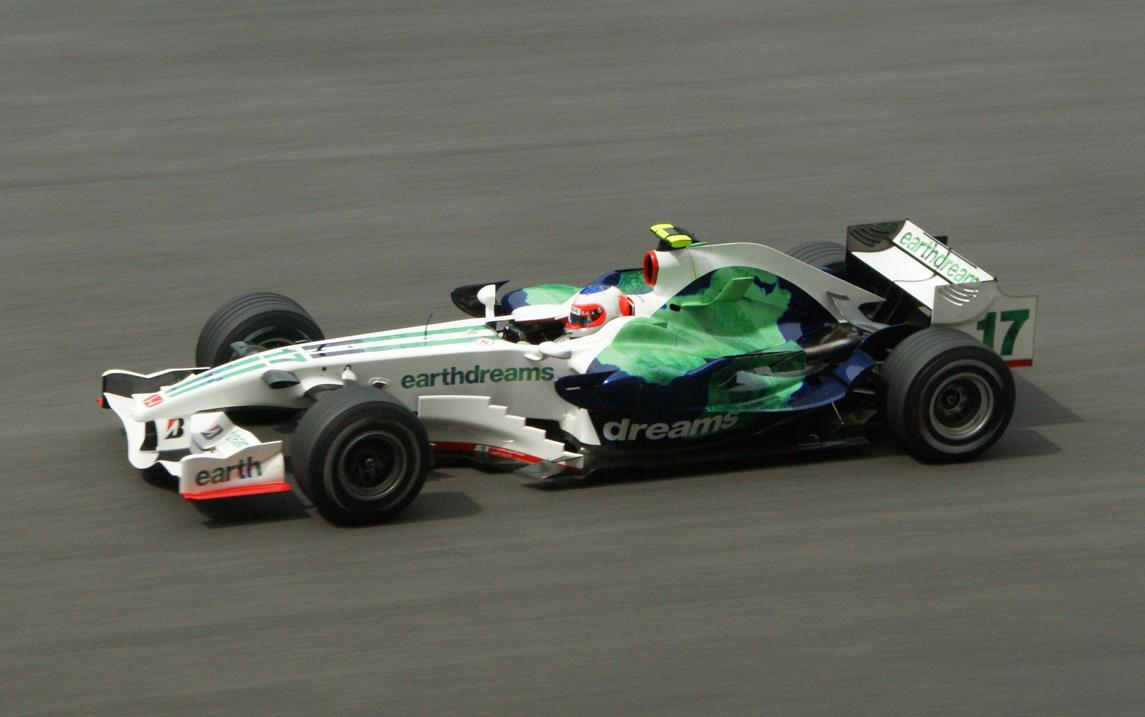
Barrichello at the 2008 Malaysian Grand Prix.

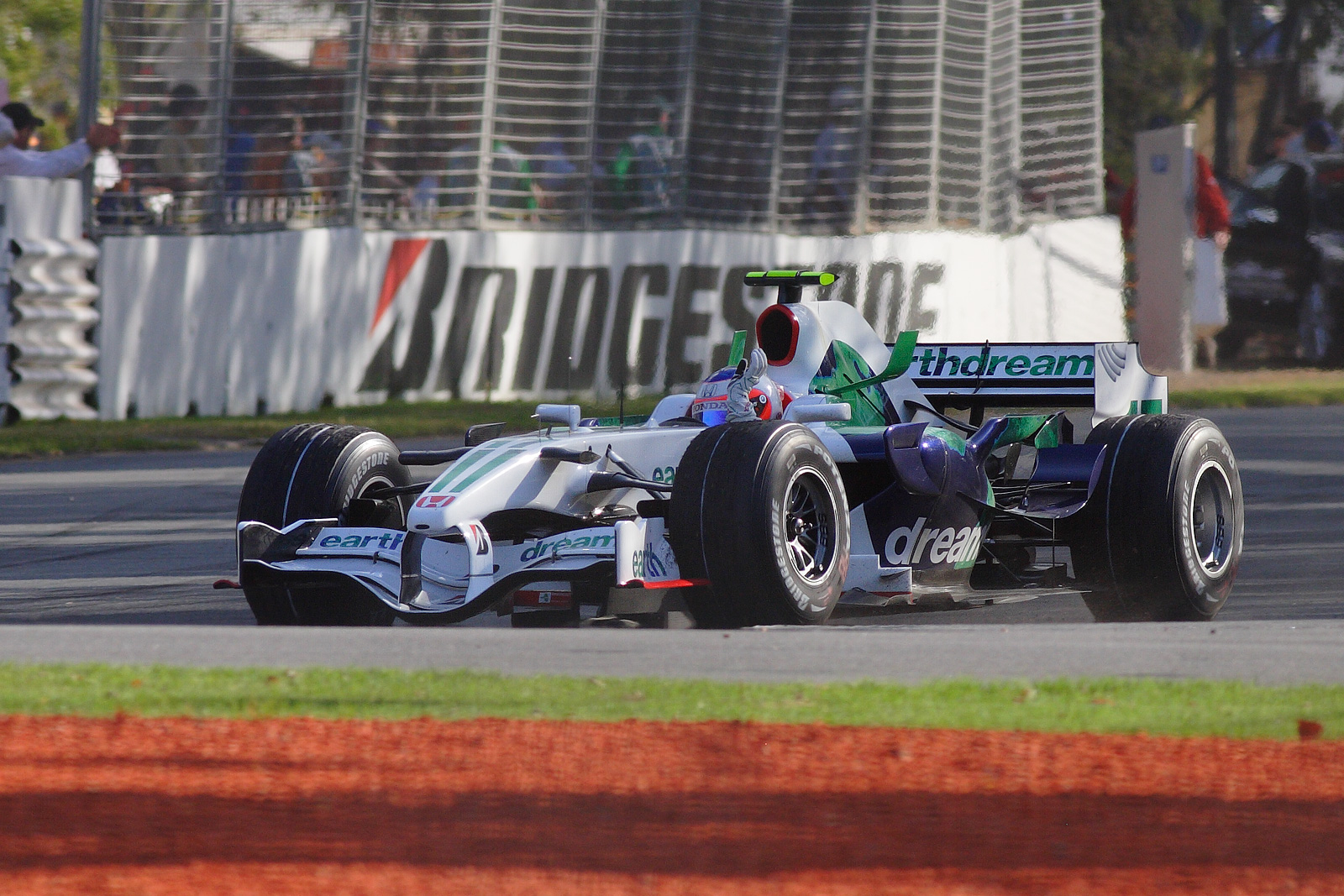
The RA108 without the "dumbo" wings at the 2008 Australian Grand Prix.

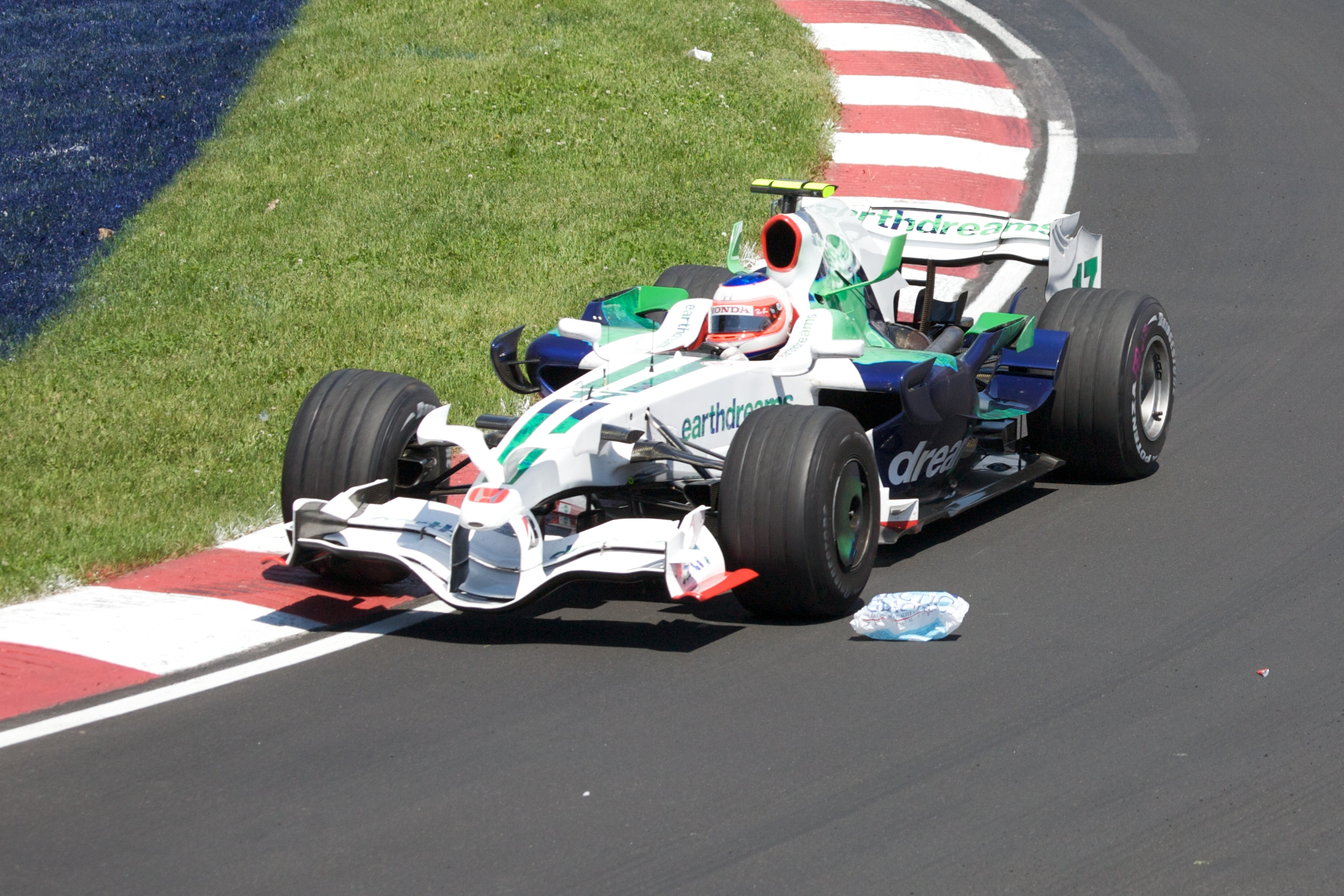
Barrichello driving the RA108 at the 2008 Canadian Grand Prix, showing the "elephant ear" nose winglets.

A close-up of the second revision "dumbo" wings, introduced in the Monaco Grand Prix.

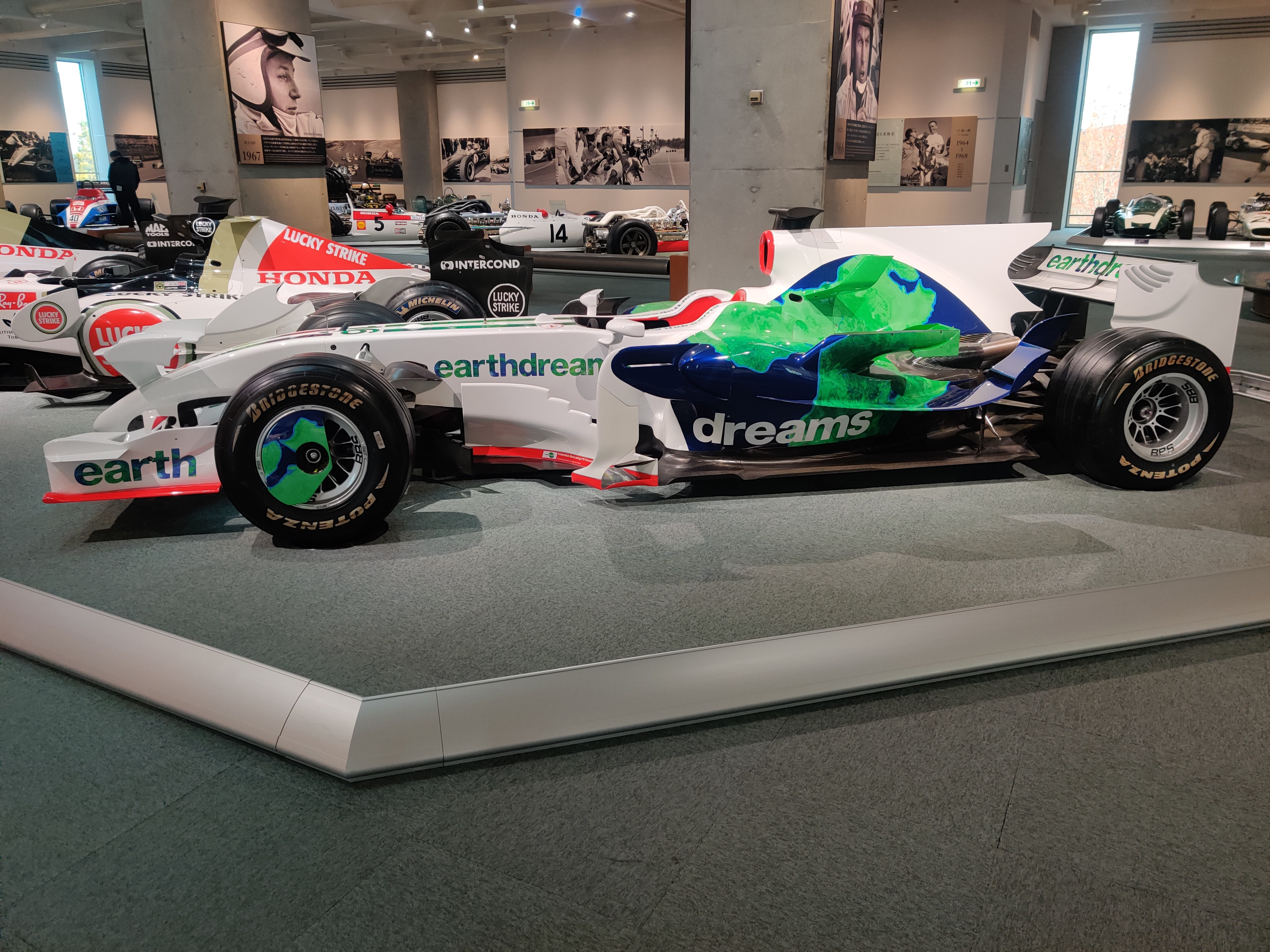
The RA108 on display at Honda Collection Hall

== Complete Formula One results ==
(key)

Year	Team	Engine	Tyres	Drivers	1	2	3	4	5	6	7	8	9	10	11	12	13	14	15	16	17	18	Points	WCC
2008	Honda Racing F1	Honda V8	B		AUS	MAL	BHR	ESP	TUR	MON	CAN	FRA	GBR	GER	HUN	EUR	BEL	ITA	SIN	JPN	CHN	BRA	14	9th
2008	Honda Racing F1	Honda V8	B	(United Kingdom) Jenson Button	Ret	10	Ret	6	11	11	11	Ret	Ret	17	12	13	15	15	9	14	16	13	14	9th
2008	Honda Racing F1	Honda V8	B	(Brazil) Rubens Barrichello	DSQ	13	11	Ret	14	6	7	14	3	Ret	16	16	Ret	17	Ret	13	11	15	14	9th
