= Mercedes MGP W01 =

2010 Formula One racing car

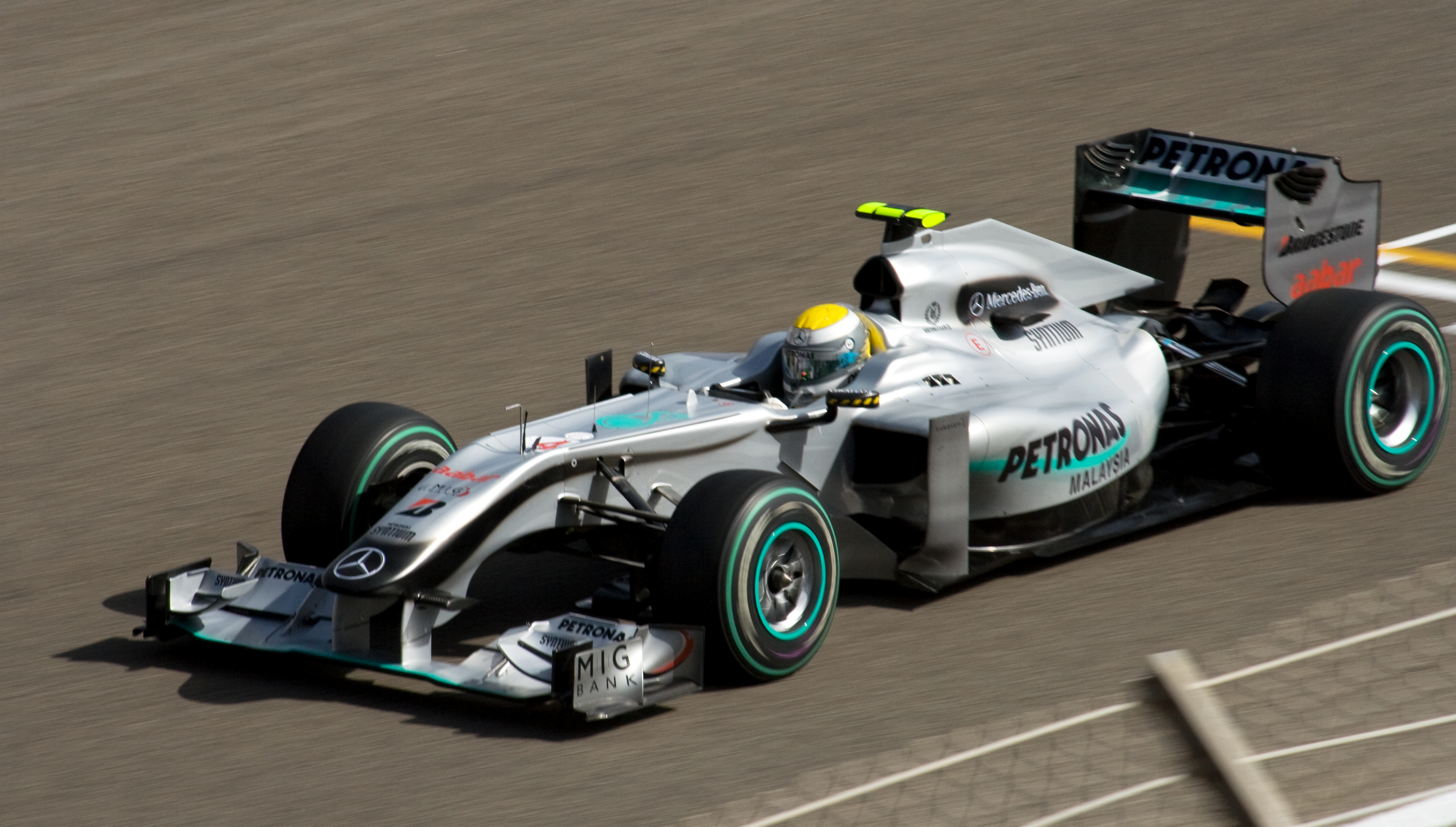
- Nico Rosberg driving the MGP W01 at the Bahrain Grand Prix.
- Category: Formula One
- Constructor: Brawn GP/Mercedes
- Designers: Ross Brawn (Technical Director); John Owen (Chief Designer); Craig Wilson (Head of Vehicle Engineering); Ian Wright (Chief Vehicle Dynamicist); Russell Cooley (Chief Engineer); Loïc Bigois (Head of Aerodynamics); David Jeffrey (Deputy Head of Aerodynamics); Ben Wood (Chief Aerodynamicist)
- Predecessor: Mercedes-Benz W196 – Mercedes Engineering; Brawn BGP 001 – Brawn branded
- Successor: Mercedes MGP W02

Technical specifications
- Chassis: Moulded carbon-fibre and honeycomb composite monocoque
- Suspension (front): Wishbone and pushrod activated torsion springs and rockers
- Suspension (rear): Wishbone and pushrod activated torsion springs and rockers, same as the front
- Engine: Mercedes-Benz FO 108X 2.4 L (146 cu in) 90° V8, limited to 18,000 RPM naturally aspirated mid-mounted
- Transmission: Jointly Xtrac 1044 with Mercedes AMG housing seven-speed semi-automatic carbon-fibre sequential gearbox with reverse gear hydraulic activation
- Weight: 620 kg (1,367 lb) (including driver)
- Fuel: Mobil (Note: Mercedes signed a technical partnership with Petronas that will see the company supply fuel and lubricants to the team from 2011. As part of the agreement, Petronas branding appears on the MGP W01, but the car still uses Mobil fuels and Mobil 1 lubricants due to late deal.)
- Lubricants: Mobil 1
- Tyres: Bridgestone; BBS Wheels (front and rear): 13"

Competition history
- Notable entrants: Mercedes GP Petronas F1 Team
- Notable drivers: 3. (Germany) Michael Schumacher; 4. (Germany) Nico Rosberg
- Debut: 2010 Bahrain Grand Prix
- Last event: 2010 Abu Dhabi Grand Prix
Races	Wins	Podiums	Poles	F/Laps
19	0	3	0	0

The Mercedes MGP W01 (commonly abbreviated as the Mercedes W01), originally known as the Brawn BGP 002) was a Formula One motor racing car designed and built by the Mercedes GP Petronas team for the 2010 season and was driven by the returning seven-time World Champion Michael Schumacher and Nico Rosberg.

== Mercedes buyout and development ==
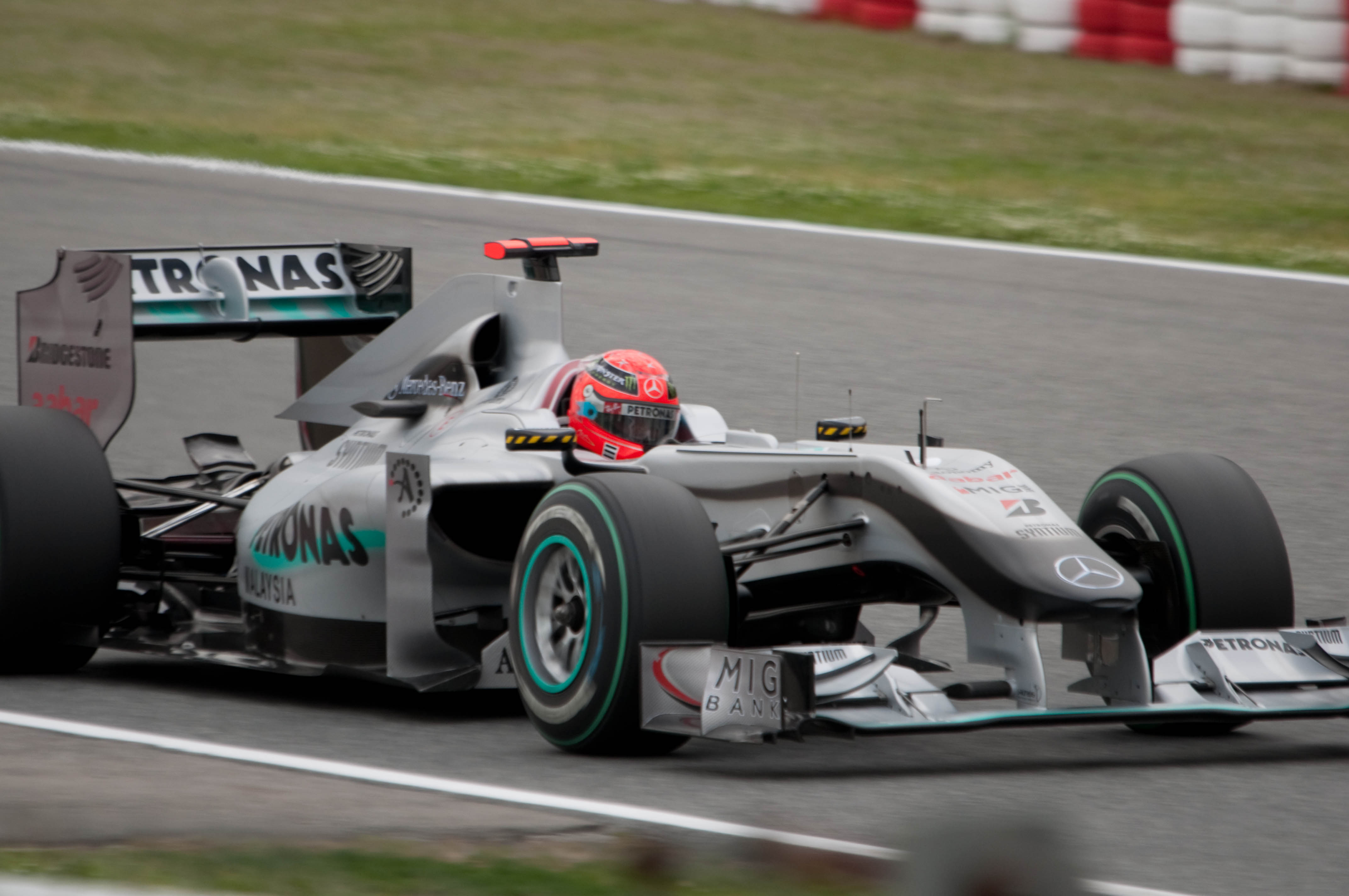
Schumacher at the Spanish Grand Prix.

The car was revealed at the Circuit Ricardo Tormo near Valencia at the first official test of the year on February 1. The team's silver livery was officially unveiled at the Mercedes-Benz Museum in Stuttgart on January 25, 2010 on the chassis of a Brawn BGP 001 following Mercedes' purchase of the championship winning team of 2009, marking the team's return to F1 for the first time since their last appearance in 1955.

Some parts of the W01 were revised as part of the upgrade at the Spanish GP; increasing the wheelbase of the car to improve the weight distribution, as well as changing the engine cover design. The shorter wheelbase was used again at the next grand prix, deemed more suitable for the narrow streets of the Monaco GP circuit.

== Racing history ==
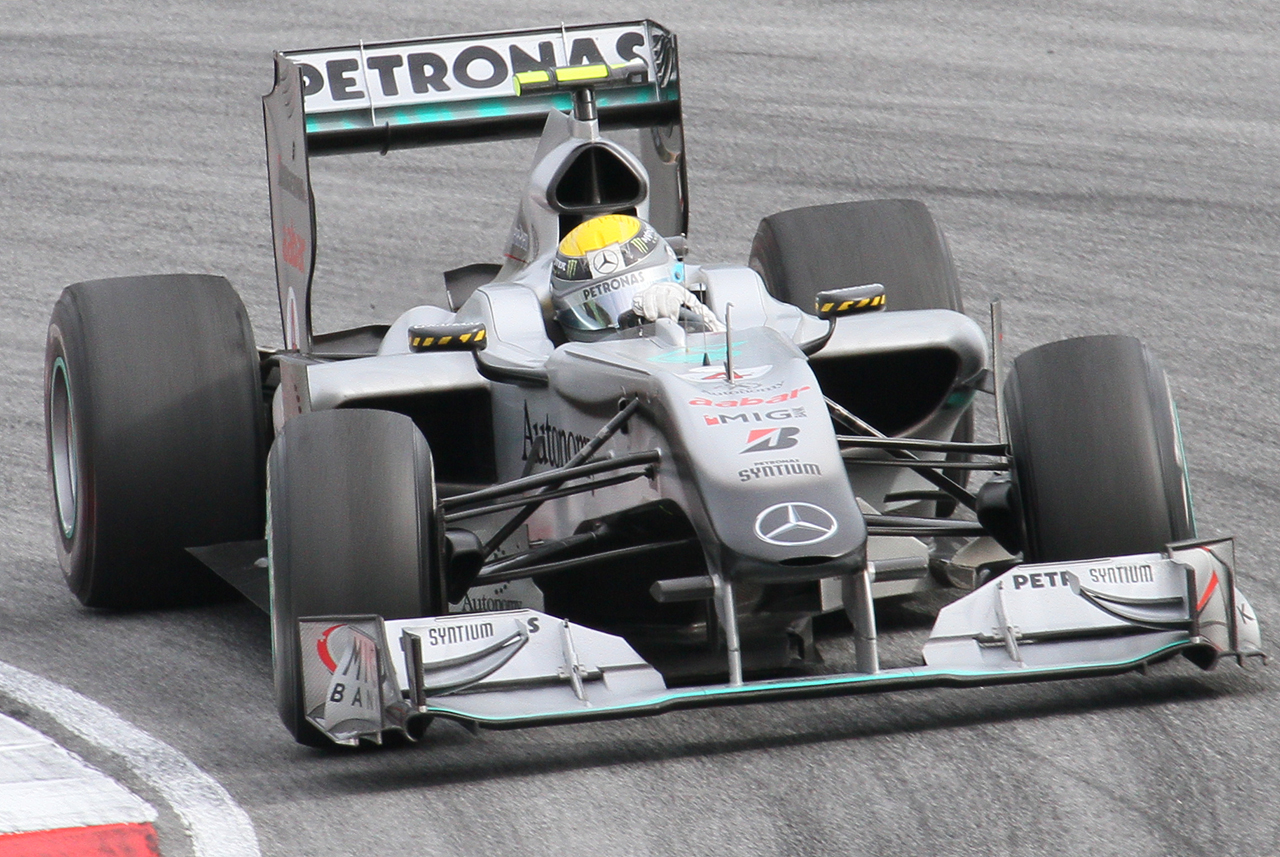
Rosberg finished on the podium at the Malaysian Grand Prix; Mercedes's first podium as a works entry since 1955.

The team's achievements in their first season did not come close to the results those of Brawn the previous year and of the Mercedes team in 1954 and 1955, with the Mercedes battling Renault for the title of 'best of the rest' behind the leading three teams of Ferrari, McLaren and Red Bull. Rosberg finished on the podium three times, at Sepang, Shanghai and Silverstone. Schumacher's best finishes were three fourth places. He did not score a race win, podium, pole position or fastest lap for the first time since his début season in 1991, and also scored the worst finish of his F1 career at Valencia, where he finished fifteenth. Schumacher was penalised for dangerous driving after forcing his former Ferrari team-mate Rubens Barrichello towards the pit wall at 180 mph (290 km/h) in Hungary. At the last race in Abu Dhabi Schumacher spun while trying to overtake Rosberg and was hit by Vitantonio Liuzzi's Force India.

The team finished fourth in the Constructors' Championship, with 214 points

== Complete Formula One results ==
(key) (results in bold indicate pole position; results in italics indicate fastest lap)

Year	Entrant	Engine	Tyres	Drivers	1	2	3	4	5	6	7	8	9	10	11	12	13	14	15	16	17	18	19	Points	WCC
2010	Mercedes GP Petronas	Mercedes FO 108X V8	**B**		BHR	AUS	MAL	CHN	ESP	MON	TUR	CAN	EUR	GBR	GER	HUN	BEL	ITA	SIN	JPN	KOR	BRA	ABU	214	4th
2010	Mercedes GP Petronas	Mercedes FO 108X V8	**B**	(Germany) Michael Schumacher	6	10	Ret	10	4	12	4	11	15	9	9	11	7	9	13	6	4	7	Ret	214	4th
2010	Mercedes GP Petronas	Mercedes FO 108X V8	**B**	(Germany) Nico Rosberg	5	5	3	3	13	7	5	6	10	3	8	Ret	6	5	5	17^{†}	Ret	6	4	214	4th

^{†} Driver failed to finish, but was classified as they had completed >90% of the race distance.
