= Ronan O'Hare =

British engineer

- Citizenship: British
- Education: Ulster University, Cranfield University
- Occupation: Engineer
- Employer: Haas F1 Team
- Known for: Formula One engineer
- Title: Race engineer

Ronan O'Hare is a Northern Irish Formula One and motorsports engineer. He is currently the race engineer to Oliver Bearman at the Haas F1 Team.

== Career ==
O’Hare studied mechanical engineering at Ulster University before completing an MSc in Motorsport Engineering and Management at Cranfield University. He began his motorsport career in junior single-seater categories, working in data and performance roles across Formula Renault, Formula 3 and A1GP programmes, before gaining experience as a research engineer with Honda Racing F1 and later Brawn GP, where he developed the hydraulic power steering system on the championship winning Brawn BGP001. He subsequently became a 7-Post Rig Engineer when the team became Mercedes-AMG F1 Team, supporting correlation testing and simulation development, before moving to Scuderia Toro Rosso in 2016 as a Vehicle Dynamics Engineer. There he worked on simulator correlation, suspension development and trackside performance analysis.

O’Hare moved to Williams Racing in 2020 as a Performance Engineer, working with Nicholas Latifi and contributing to car-setup development, simulator studies and race-weekend analysis. In 2022 he joined the Haas F1 Team as Performance Engineer to Mick Schumacher, later continuing in the same role with Nico Hülkenberg through the 2024 season. He was promoted to Race Engineer in 2025, working with Oliver Bearman and taking responsibility for car performance, set-up direction and race execution.
