= Mercedes-Benz M196 engine =

Mercedes-Benz M196
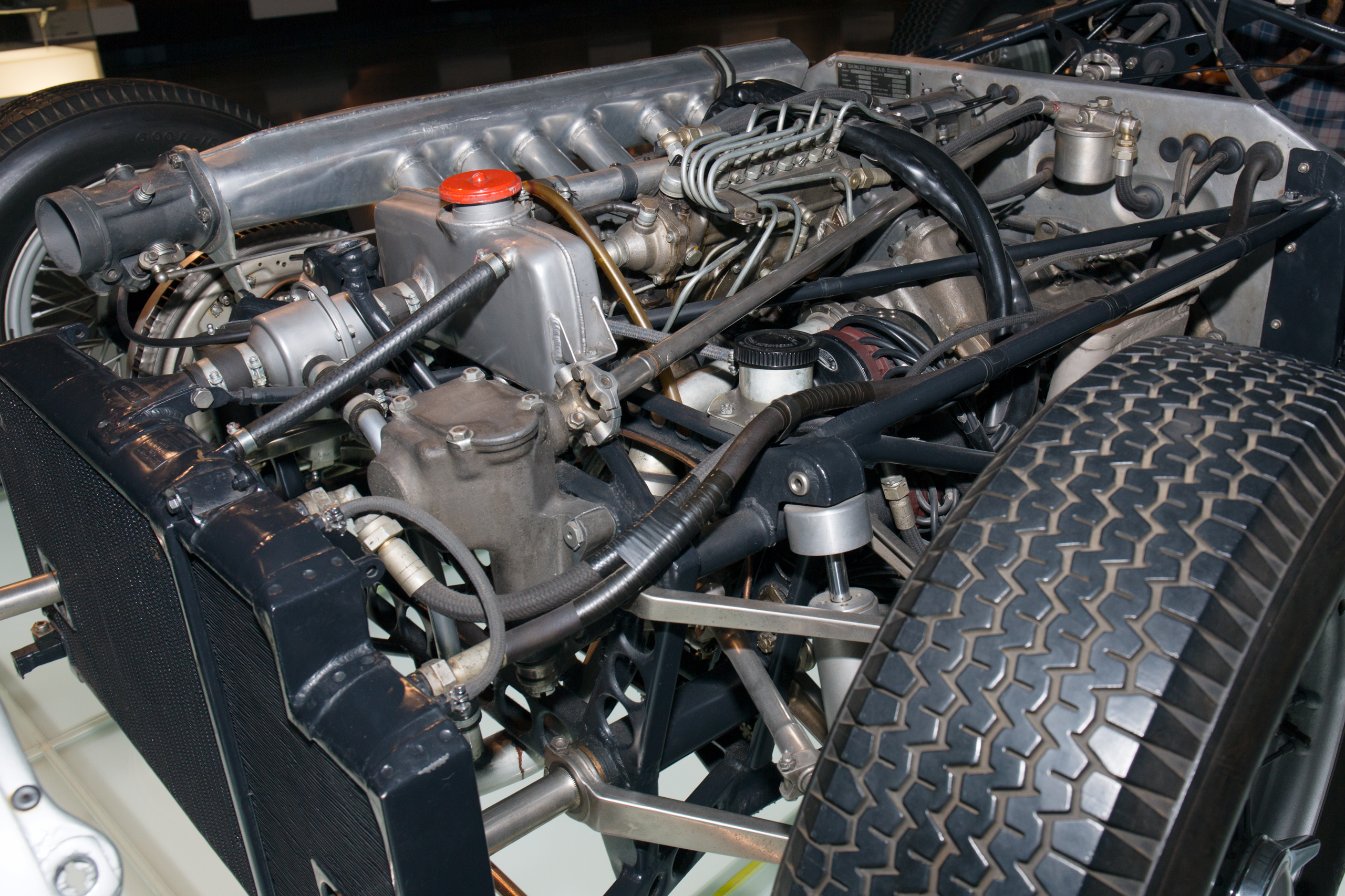

Overview
- Manufacturer: Daimler-Benz
- Production: 1954-1955

Layout
- Configuration: Straight-eight
- Displacement: 2,496 cm^{3} (152 cu in) (M 196 R); 2,982 cm^{3} (182 cu in) (M 196 S)
- Cylinder bore: 76 mm (3.0 in) (M 196 R); 78 mm (3.1 in) (M 196 S)
- Piston stroke: 68.8 mm (2.7 in) (M 196 R); 78 mm (3.1 in) (M 196 S)
- Valvetrain: Desmodromic valvetrain, DOHC, two valves per cylinder
- Compression ratio: 12:1 (M 196 R); 9:1 (M 196 S)

Combustion
- Operating principle: Four-stroke Otto
- Fuel system: Direct fuel injection
- Fuel type: Esso RD1 (M 196 R); Super petrol 98 RON leaded DIN 51600 (M 196 S)
- Oil system: Dry sump

Output
- Power output: 256 PS (188 kW) (M 196 R, 1954); 265 PS (195 kW) (M 196 R, 1955); 290 PS (213 kW) (M 196 R, final version); 276 PS (203 kW) or 310 PS (228 kW) (M 196 S)
- Torque output: 30 kp⋅m (294 N⋅m) (M 196 R); 31.7 kp⋅m (311 N⋅m) (M 196 S)

The Mercedes-Benz M196 engine is a naturally-aspirated, straight-8, racing engine, designed, developed, and produced by Daimler-Benz; and used in both sports car racing and Formula One racing, between 1954 and 1955. Daimler-Benz made two versions of the engine, the M 196 R, displacing 2.5 litres, and the M 196 S, displacing 3.0 litres.

Mercedes pulled out of all motorsports after the 1955 Le Mans disaster. This was their last Formula One engine, and Mercedes did not return to motorsport as an engine manufacturer until 1994, when they supplied engines to the Sauber Formula One team.

== M 196 R ==
1954 Mercedes-Benz W196
Mercedes-Benz W196 driven by Stirling Moss at Goodwood Festival of Speed 2009

The new 1954 Formula One rules allowed a choice of naturally aspirated engines – up to 2.5 litres or 0.75 litres supercharged. The expected target range for competitive engines was 250 to 300 bhp (190 to 220 kW).

By its introduction at the 1954 French GP the 2,496 cc (152.3 cu in) (76.0×68.8 mm) desmodromic valves straight 8 M 196 R delivered 256 PS (188 kW). The M 196 was the only F1 engine with direct fuel injection, giving it a considerable advantage over the other carburetted engines.

For the 1955 season, Daimler-Benz improved its M 196 R engine by reducing the intake manifold length, increasing the engine power slightly to 265 PS (195 kW).

The latest iteration of the 2.5-litre unit eventually had a compression in the range of ε=12.0…12.5, produced up to 290 PS (213 kW) at 8500/min, and delivered a maximum torque of 25.8 kp⋅m (253 N⋅m) at 6450/min, equivalent to a BMEP of 13 kp/cm^{2} (1.27 MPa).

== M 196 S ==
For the W 196 S race car, the M 196 engine was bored and stroked to 78 mm each (78.0 × 78.0 mm), and reduced in compression from ε=12 to about ε=9. The latter allowed using standardised petrol (98 RON) instead of high-octane race fuel required for the M 196 R. The M 196 S has a power output of 276 PS (203 kW) at 7,000 rpm, and produces a maximum torque of 31.7 kp⋅m (311 N⋅m) at 5,950 rpm. This is equivalent to a BMEP of 1.31 MPa (190 lbf/in^{2}).

The M 196 S is canted to the right at a 53° angle. It has two four-cylinder banks made of silumin with chromium-coated aluminium cylinder sleeves. Unlike typical car engines, the M 196 S has a crankshaft consisting of two Hirth joint halves with centre torque take-off. The silumin cylinder heads are crossflow heads and cast together with the cylinder banks (i. e. block and head are a single cast piece). Daimler-Benz fitted the engine with a dry-sump lubrication system, water cooling, and a direct fuel injection system. The ignition system is a traditional magneto system.

== Applications ==
- Mercedes-Benz W196
- Mercedes-Benz 300 SLR
