= Simon Cole (engineer) =

British engineer

- Citizenship: British
- Occupation: Engineer
- Employer: Mercedes AMG Petronas Motorsport
- Known for: Formula One engineer
- Title: Chief Engineer - Trackside

Simon Cole is a British Formula One engineer. He is currently the Chief Engineer - Trackside at the Mercedes AMG Petronas F1 Team.

== Career ==
Cole started his motorsport career with the Subaru World Rally Team, where in 2001 he served as Chief Engineer to Richard Burns during the Briton's successful campaign for the World Rally Championship Drivers’ title. Later in 2001, Cole moved to Formula One, joining British American Racing as a test engineer. He played a key role in the team's trackside testing operations and was promoted to Chief Test Engineer as the outfit transitioned into Honda Racing F1. In this capacity he oversaw car validation, reliability development, and the integration of new components between factory and circuit activities.

Following Honda's withdrawal from Formula One at the end of 2008, Cole remained with the Brackley-based team under its new identity as Brawn GP. During the 2009 season he served as Chief Race Engineer, contributing to the operational performance of the Brawn BGP001, which secured both the Drivers’ and Constructors’ Championships. When the team was acquired by Mercedes-Benz and became the Mercedes-AMG Petronas Formula One Team in 2010, Cole transitioned into the role of Chief Engineer – Trackside. He became responsible for overall car reliability and technical compliance during race weekends, acting as the principal liaison with the FIA on matters relating to technical regulations. He works closely with race engineers and factory-based support groups to monitor system health, assess risk, and make operational decisions, including whether a car must pit or retire for reliability reasons and advising on driving-style adaptations to manage component limits such as brake wear or temperature thresholds.
