= Brawn BGP 001 =

2009 Formula One racing automobile

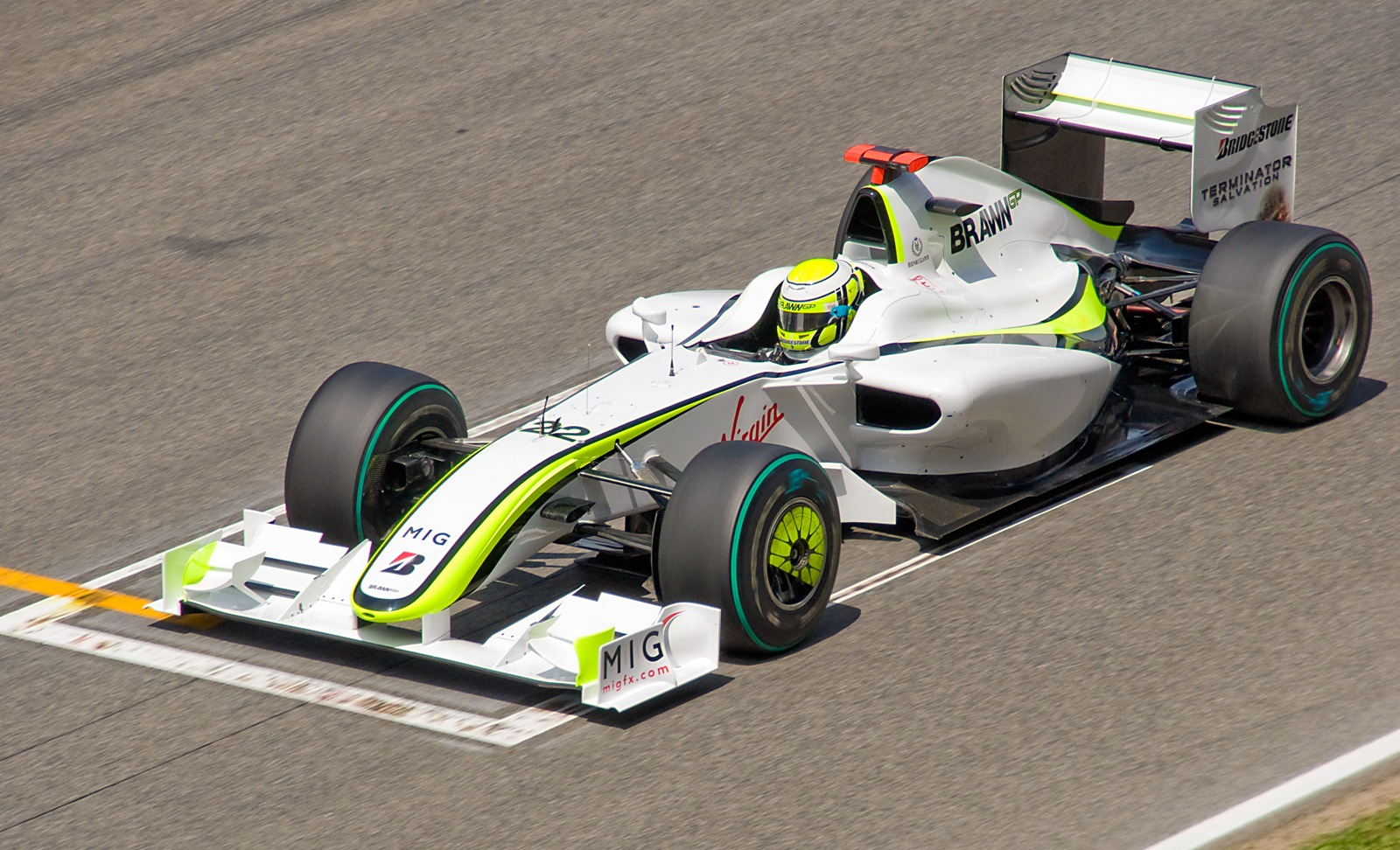
- Jenson Button driving the BGP 001 at the Spanish Grand Prix
- Category: Formula One
- Constructor: Honda/Brawn GP
- Designers: Ross Brawn (Technical Director); Jörg Zander (Deputy Technical Director); Jacky Eeckelaert (Engineering Director); Craig Wilson (Head of Vehicle Engineering); Ian Wright (Chief Vehicle Dynamicist); John Owen (Project Leader); Russell Cooley (Chief Engineer); Loïc Bigois (Head of Aerodynamics); David Jeffrey (Deputy Head of Aerodynamics); Ben Wood (Chief Aerodynamicist); Masayuki Minagawa (Double Diffuser, Concept Lead)
- Production: 3
- Predecessor: Honda RA108
- Successor: Mercedes MGP W01

Technical specifications
- Chassis: Moulded carbon fibre and honeycomb composite monocoque.
- Suspension (front): Wishbone and pushrod activated torsion springs and rockers.
- Suspension (rear): As front
- Engine: Mercedes-Benz FO 108W 2.4 L (146 cu in) V8, naturally aspirated, limited to 18,000 RPM mid-mounted.
- Transmission: Brawn GP, 7 forward gears + 1 reverse, semi-automatic.
- Power: 750 hp @ 18,000 RPM
- Fuel: Mobil
- Tyres: Bridgestone

Competition history
- Notable entrants: Brawn GP F1 Team
- Notable drivers: 22. (United Kingdom) Jenson Button; 23. (Brazil) Rubens Barrichello
- Debut: 2009 Australian Grand Prix
- First win: 2009 Australian Grand Prix
- Last win: 2009 Italian Grand Prix
- Last event: 2009 Abu Dhabi Grand Prix
Races	Wins	Podiums	Poles	F/Laps
17	8	15	5	4
- Constructors' Championships: 1 (2009)
- Drivers' Championships: 1 (2009, Jenson Button)

The Brawn BGP 001 (originally known as the Honda RA109K) is a Formula One world championship winning racing car, the design of which was started by Honda Racing, and completed and then built by the team after it was renamed to Brawn GP. It was the first and only Formula One car constructed by the Brawn GP team, and was used to contest the 2009 Formula One season. The car won eight out of the seventeen Grands Prix it competed in. It was notable for its unusual double diffuser, and its legality was disputed, though it was ultimately deemed legal by the FIA. This is the first Brackley-based F1 car to utilise Mercedes-Benz engines, which is used by its successor factory team. The BGP 001 was the last Mercedes customer team to win the Constructors' Championship until the McLaren MCL38 in 2024, which was then followed by the McLaren MCL39 in 2025.

The BGP 001 made its competitive debut at the 2009 Australian Grand Prix, where Jenson Button took pole position in qualifying and finished first in the race while his teammate Rubens Barrichello took second place in both qualifying and race. During the first half of the season alone, Button took seven further podiums, including six wins, which, due to a mid-season drop in performance from the team which meant he did not score any further victories, gave him enough momentum to secure his first Drivers' Championship. Barrichello took six podiums, including two wins, though he dropped to third behind Red Bull's Sebastian Vettel.

== Background ==
=== Chassis ===
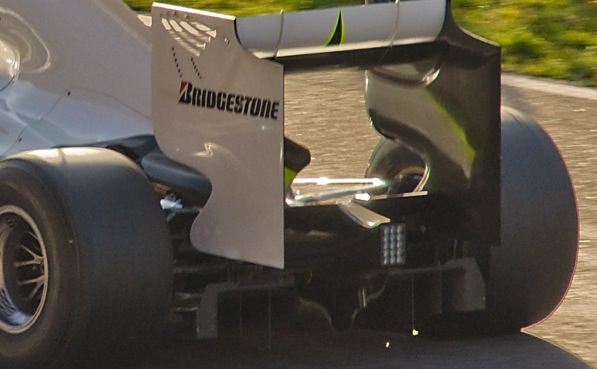
The controversial diffuser of the BGP 001.

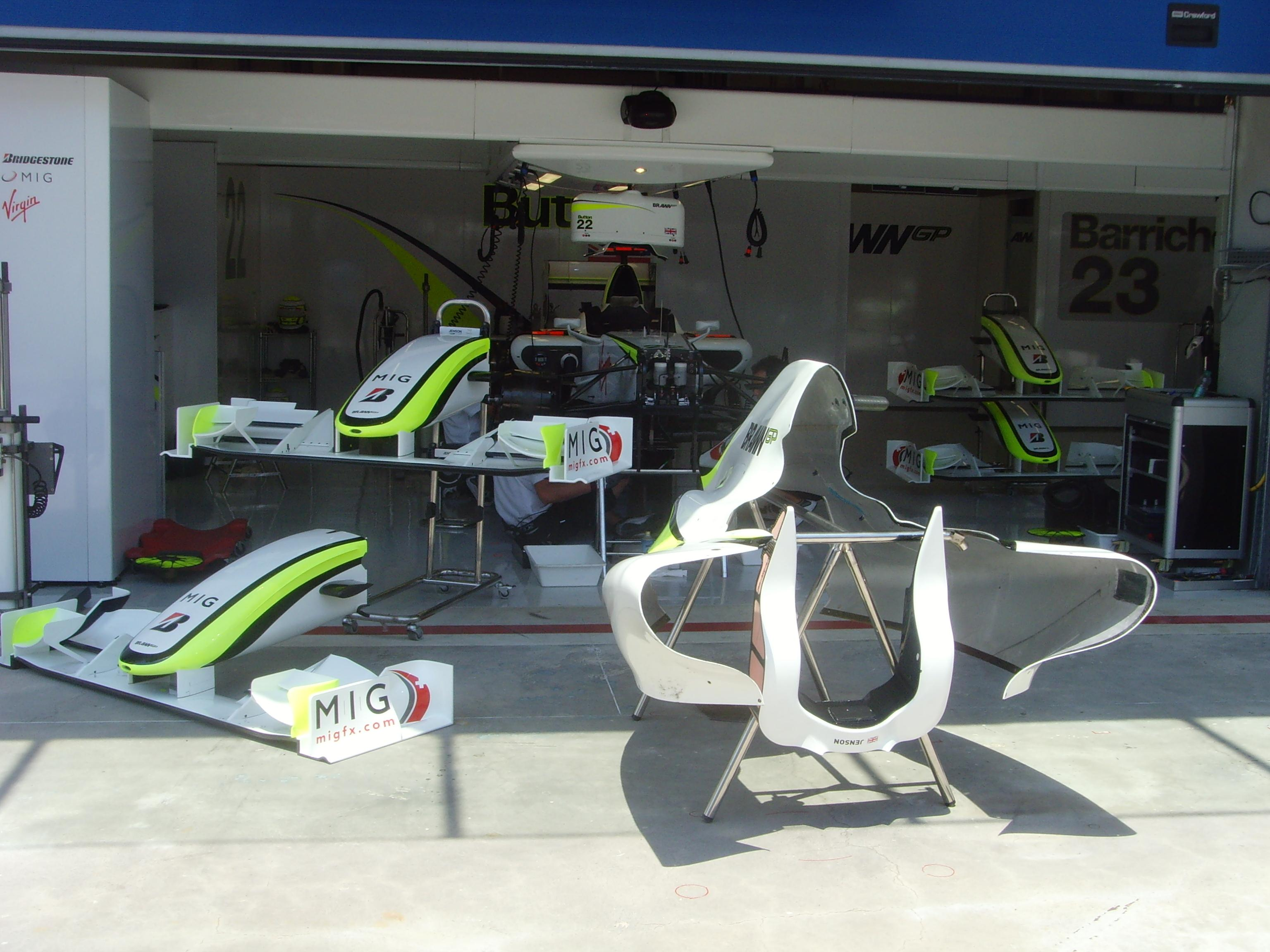
The revised front wing and engine cover at the Turkish Grand Prix

Honda Racing began development for their 2009 car early in the 2008 season. In December 2008, Honda announced their plans to withdraw from Formula One. Development of what would become the BGP 001 continued whilst a buyer was sought for the team. The team were purchased by Team Principal Ross Brawn, and the outfit renamed Brawn GP. It was designed by Loïc Bigois, in similar respects to all the other cars on the grid with a moulded carbon fibre and honeycomb composite monocoque and a front and rear wishbone and pushrod activated suspension system. Remarkably, it was revealed that the modifications made to the car to accommodate its Mercedes engine saw six inches removed from the rear end, severely compromising the car's center of gravity and by the time the team realized how much the car's balance had changed, there was no time to commission a new design. Ross Brawn also admitted that there were fundamental problems with the car, stating that it was too heavy, and that some of the parts were not good for the car.

Yet the car had one difference, which was focused on the rear so-called 'double-decker diffuser'. The diffuser is at the rear of the car and is a route to get downforce by using the airflow under the car's floor. The BGP 001 had a different central channel to its diffuser with the shape of the structure being used to create advanced type of double-decker design. The diffuser's controversial aspect was the hole in the rear which increases the speed of airflow as it heads towards the higher rear venturi section, where it expands and creates more downforce. Other teams argued that the presence of the hole was against the regulations.

At the first race of the season in Australia an official complaint was launched by Renault, Red Bull and Ferrari against the diffusers of the Williams FW31, Toyota TF109 and the BGP 001 saying that they were illegal. However the race stewards did not share that view and rejected the other teams' complaints. Subsequently, the car was cleared to race in Melbourne. The same problem was faced in Malaysia after BMW tried again but failed.

Over the controversy the 'non-diffuser' teams, Ferrari, BMW Sauber, Red Bull, lodged an official appeal against the design and the date was set for April 13, 2009 for the FIA International Court of appeal (ICA); putting the first two races under appeal meaning the cars' first two wins of the season with Button could have been removed. After discussing the legality of the diffusers throughout Tuesday a verdict was becoming clear. On Wednesday 14th the ICA concluded that the diffusers' designs were legal and complied with the 2009 regulations, rejecting the teams' appeal.

With the diffuser change, the new rules in place for the 2009 season required cars to have narrower and higher rear wings and wider and lower front wings, designed to reduce air disturbance for following cars and hence make overtaking easier. Slick tyres were also re-introduced in the 2009 Formula One season, having been absent since 1998, this said to increase tyre grip by about 20%.

=== Engine and transmission ===
The BGP 001 used a Mercedes-Benz FO 108W engine, supplied through a customer deal. Per the 2009 regulations, the engine was a naturally aspirated V8 and was rev-limited to 18,000 rpm. Originally the car was engineered for a Honda-designed engine, however, when Honda announced their withdrawal from the sport, a customer deal with Mercedes was obtained. It was reported that deals with Ferrari and Mercedes were available, the latter being chosen as it was simpler to integrate into the existing car. However, an unnamed senior Brawn GP engineer, after the title-winning race in Brazil, was reported saying that significant and unconventional changes were made to accommodate the FO108W engine. Simon Cole, Brawn's chief trackside engineer, alluded that the team had decided against using Ferrari engines for fear that Ferrari would control the car's engine performance and not let a customer team beat them.

According to team CEO Nick Fry, the Mercedes engine was critical in the team's success, saying that it accounted for 50 percent of the team's upturn in performance and that they would not have won the championship with the Honda engines.

Brawn-Mercedes BGP 001

Unlike Mercedes's other customer Force India, which took supply of both the engine and a McLaren-designed transmission, the BGP 001 used a semi-automatic sequential transmission designed in-house at Brawn. This provided seven forward gears and one reverse gear, and was operated using two paddles located on the steering wheel. As with the engine installation, compromises were made with the gearbox. It did not sit in the ideal position because the crank-center height on the Mercedes engine was different from the Honda. Brawn did not opt to use the KERS system, which would have provided an extra 80 bhp (60 kW) for up to 6.6 seconds a lap, due to the constraints such a device would place on the design of the car and the extra weight it would add. Ross Brawn had suggested that a KERS was not a high priority for the team.

Per the 2009 Formula One regulations, Brawn GP was limited to using eight engines per car throughout the season. The limited availability of engines led to a record being broken by the Brawn team; it was the first time one particular build of an engine had won three Grand Prix races in succession.

=== Production numbers ===
Given the limited budget and development time, only three chassis were ever made (larger teams, such as McLaren built as many as eight): one for each driver and a spare. Due to the physical demands from reusing the same chassis to this extent, the condition of the chassis had deteriorated so much that the cars began to lose pace as the season progressed. The spare was used by Rubens Barrichello in Singapore, while Jenson Button used the second Brawn chassis BGP 001–02 in every practice, qualifying session and race between the 2009 Australian Grand Prix and the 2009 Brazilian Grand Prix. This meant that he won the championship in the oldest car on the grid. Chassis BGP 001-02 is now owned by Ross Brawn and was demonstrated at the 2016 Goodwood Festival of Speed. Chassis 02 was painted silver after 2009 for the 2010 launch of Mercedes GP and used as a demonstration car for two years before being returned to its previous Brawn livery.

== 2009 ==
=== Testing ===
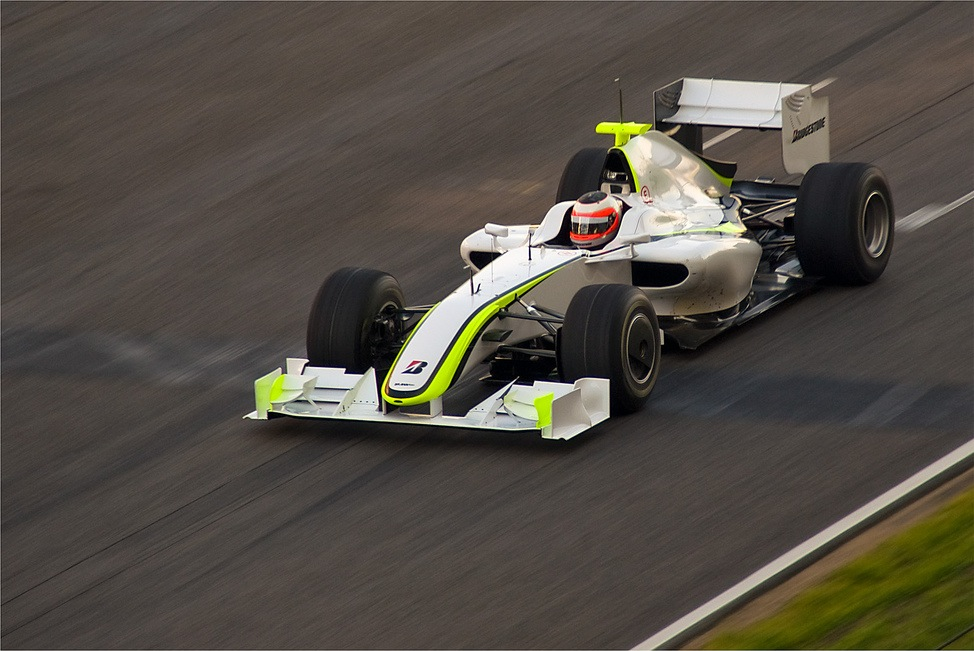
Barrichello driving the BGP 001.

On the day of the BGP 001's debut, at Silverstone in the United Kingdom on March 6, 2009, Jenson Button performed the shakedown – the car featuring white, fluorescent yellow and black colours – ahead of a more comprehensive testing and development programme at the Circuit de Catalunya on March 9–12 and the Circuito de Jerez on March 15–18.

Brawn GP gave the BGP 001 its first test at the Circuit de Catalunya on 9 March 2009, topping the timesheets early on in the first session, eventually finishing the session in fourth. On day two, Rubens Barrichello took over and completed 111 laps, finishing third in the standings. This was followed by Button topping the timesheets on the third day by over a second clear of Felipe Massa's Ferrari, completing 130 laps. In response, Massa hailed the BGP 001 as the most competitive pre-season car, stating that he does not think anyone can top their times and that Ferrari is currently less competitive than Brawn GP. On the final day of the test, Barrichello replicated the feat of his teammate; topping the time sheets by over eight-tenths of a second from Nico Rosberg's Williams, completing 110 laps.

With the testing moving to Circuito de Jerez, Brawn continued to set the pace, six-tenths clear of Renault's Fernando Alonso, completing 107 laps. Alonso topped the timesheets on day two, edging Barrichello into second leaving Button third, as the drivers completed 74 laps between them. On the final day, Button topped once again, two-tenths clear of Rosberg with Nelson Piquet Jr. and Lewis Hamilton further behind.

The car's first race was at the Australian Grand Prix on March 29.

=== 2009 season ===
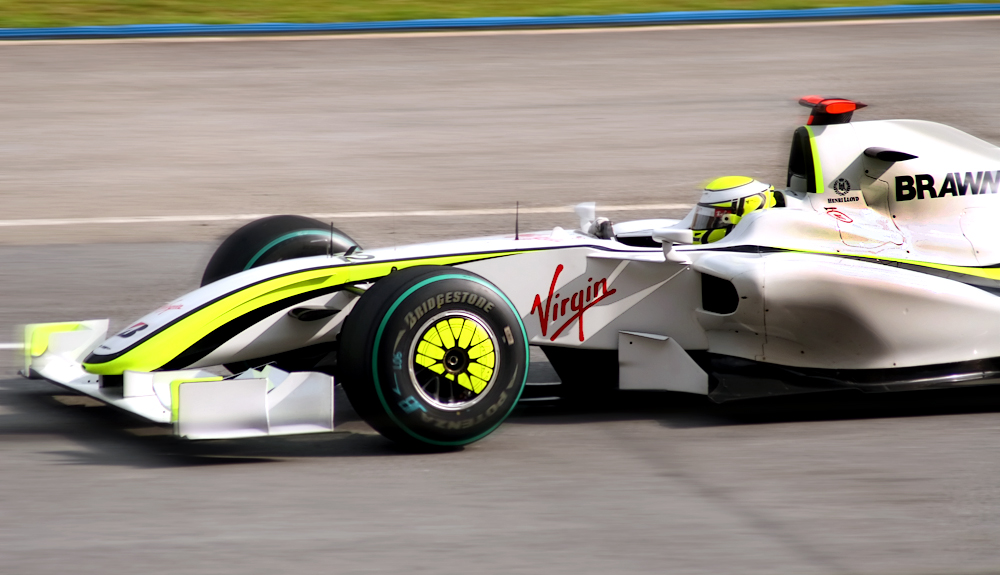
Button at the Malaysian Grand Prix.

The car was used by Jenson Button and Rubens Barrichello for all 17 races of the 2009 season. It won the season opening Australian Grand Prix in the hands of Button, with Barrichello finishing second giving the BGP 001 a 1-2 finish on its debut, which had not happened since 1954.

The car achieved podium finishes in all of the first 8 races of the season with Button winning 6 times, at the Australian, Malaysian, Bahrain, Spanish, Monaco and Turkish Grands Prix. In the latter half of the season, it only achieved two more wins (Valencia and Monza), both in Barrichello's hands.

The legality of the car's diffuser was disputed by other teams, but ultimately cleared by the FIA. At the first race of the season in Australia, an official complaint was launched by Renault, Red Bull and Ferrari against the diffusers of the Williams FW31, Toyota TF109 and the BGP 001 saying that they were illegal. However the race stewards did not share that view and rejected the other teams' complaints. Subsequently, the car was cleared to race in Melbourne. There was an appeal launched on the 'diffuser cars' but was rejected by the FIA on Wednesday 14 April 2009 leaving the diffuser on the BGP 001 clear to race.

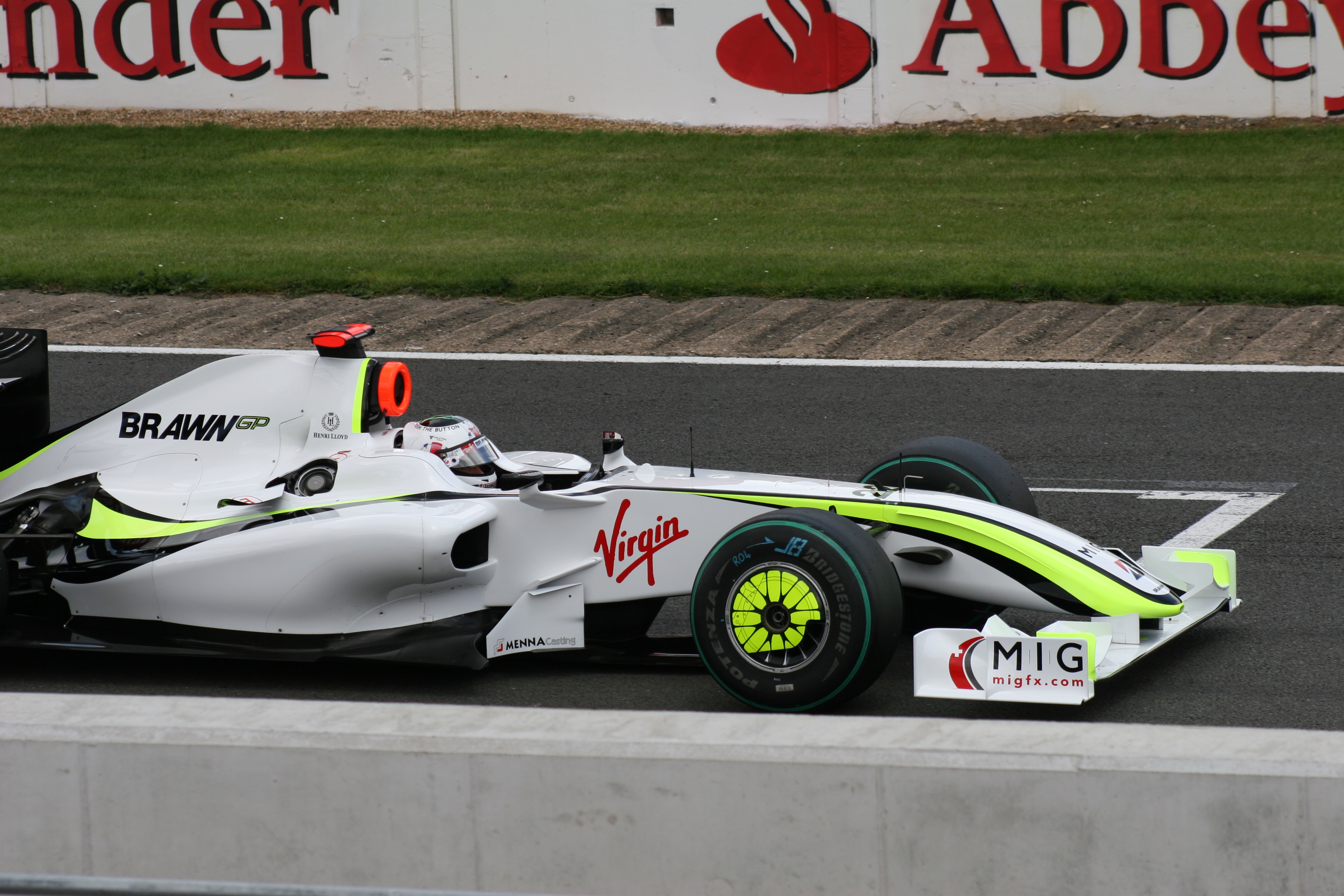
Button at the British Grand Prix.

A characteristic of the car was that in colder weather, such as at the British Grand Prix and German Grand Prix the BGP 001 struggled as it couldn't heat its tyres. The reason the car struggled with tyre temperature is because it managed its tyres better in hotter climates but in colder climates this meant the car wasn't hard enough on the tyres to get the heat into them.

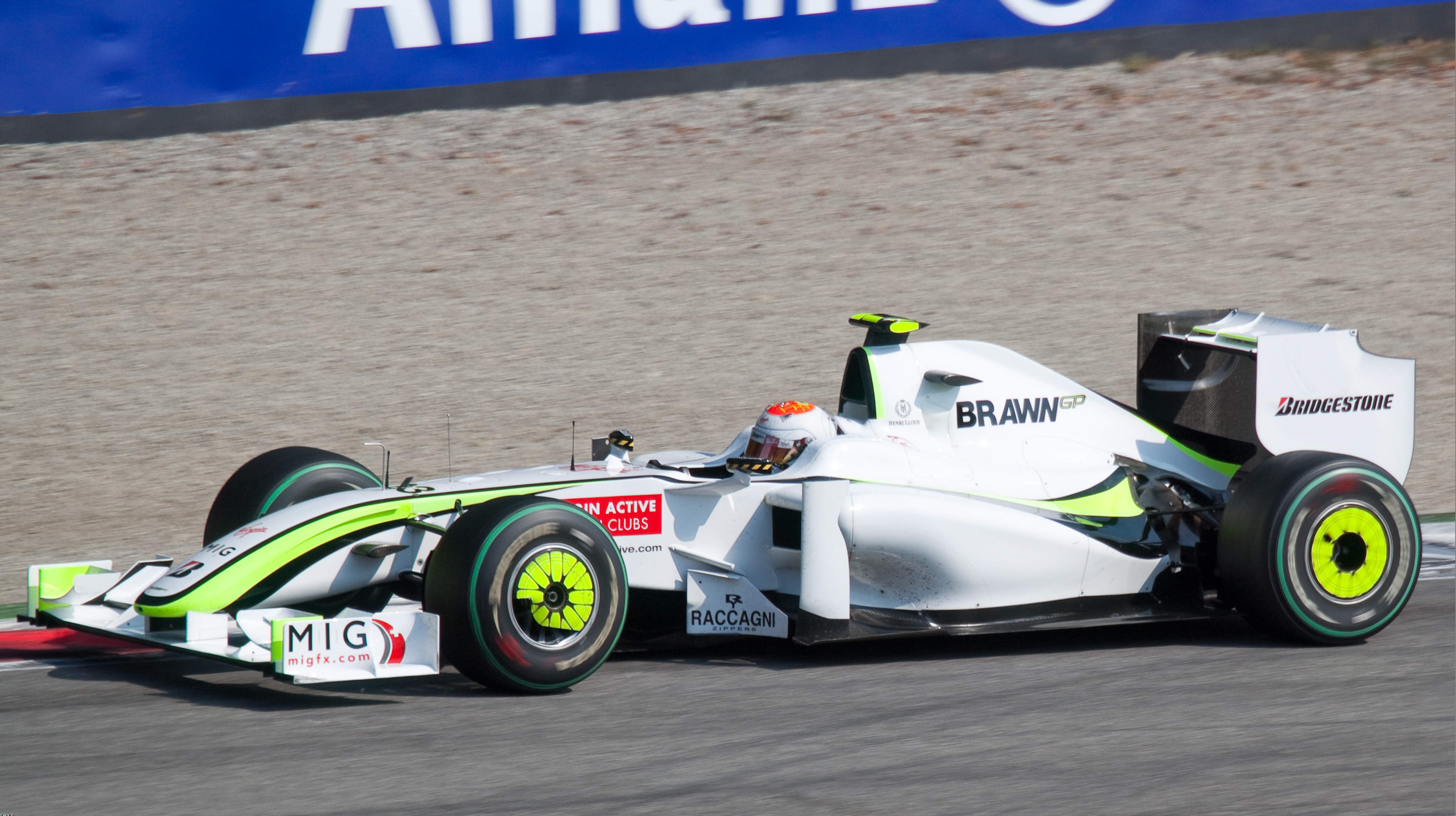
Barrichello driving the BGP 001 at the Italian Grand Prix, where he took his final Formula One victory.

At the Spanish Grand Prix, the car received its first performance upgrade, but the car's development over the course of the season failed to keep pace with that of its rivals, and in later races was unable to challenge McLaren and Red Bull Racing.

The win in Monaco marked the first time in Formula One history that the same engine had won three Grands Prix in succession.

The car suffered its first and only mechanical retirement at the Turkish Grand Prix when Barrichello lost seventh gear. The only other retirement was in the Belgian Grand Prix, when Button was involved in a collision.

Another notable incident occurred at the Hungarian GP, a suspension spring came off Barrichello's car during the third qualifying period and struck Felipe Massa's helmet that left the Ferrari driver briefly unconscious as he crashed head-on into a tyre barrier, sustaining a serious head injury.

== Sponsorship and livery ==
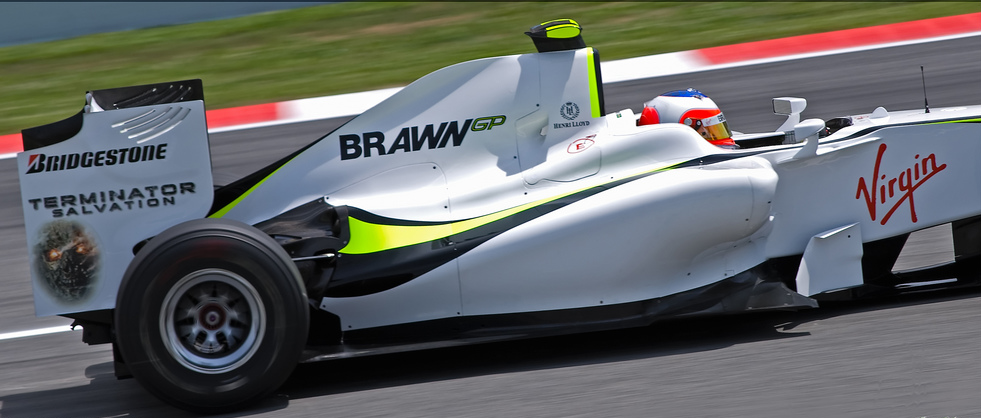
The BGP 001 at the Spanish Grand Prix, with imagery from Terminator Salvation on its rear wing.

When it was first run, the only logos covering the plain white body of the BGP 001 were those of Bridgestone and Brawn GP themselves. Gradually, as the team began earning sponsors, the car began filling up with logos – beginning with that of Henri Lloyd, and shortly followed by Virgin Group following their major sponsorship of the team. MIG Bank became a major sponsor and was advertised on the front of the BGP 001 for Chinese Grand Prix eventually covering the front of the car by themselves.

At the Spanish Grand Prix, the car sported imagery and the logo of the film Terminator Salvation on its rear wing for the entirety of the race weekend. Before the British Grand Prix the team signed Graham-London. Their logo was shown on the cars' wing mirrors. For the Singapore Grand Prix, Brawn GP secured a sponsorship deal with Canon. For the Brazilian Grand Prix, Brawn GP closed a deal with Petrópolis brewery to stamp their colours and beer brand Itaipava on both cars.

=== Drivers' helmets ===
Jenson Button wore a special helmet at the British Grand Prix, where fans were given the opportunity to design a unique British-themed helmet for Button's home race. Button chose Bernie Zobl's 'Push The Button' design.

== Legacy ==
The BGP 001 was featured in F1 2009. On 18 June 2018, it was announced by Codemasters that this car would appear as a classic car in F1 2018 and its subsequent releases, F1 2019 and F1 2020.

== Chassis log ==
BGP 001	Three built (BGP 001/01–BGP 001/03) – all still in existence as of 2019
BGP 001/01	Shakedown tested by Button at Silverstone on 6 March 2009. Raced by Barrichello to victory at Valencia (European GP) and also raced by him previously at Albert Park, Sepang, Shanghai (also fastest lap), Bahrain, Barcelona-Catalunya (Spanish GP; also fastest lap), Monaco, Istanbul, Silverstone, the Nürburgring and the Hungaroring. Used by him only in practice and qualifying at Marina Bay (crashed). Later rebuilt, and used by Mercedes GP as a show car in silver livery. Transferred by Mercedes GP to Button in amicable settlement of legal dispute that went to the High Court in London in June 2010. As of 2019 was without engine, gearbox and other parts. Owned by Button until 2024, when he sold it to a private collector. Auctioned at the 2025 Miami Grand Prix, "mechanically complete with engine and gearbox casing minus gearbox internals."
BGP 001/02	Raced by Button to victories at Albert Park (also pole position), Sepang (also pole position and fastest lap), Bahrain, Barcelona-Catalunya (Spanish GP; also pole position), Monaco (also pole position) and Istanbul (also fastest lap); also raced by him at Shanghai, Silverstone, the Nürburgring and the Hungaroring, Valencia (European GP), Spa-Francorchamps, Monza, Marina Bay, Suzuka, Interlagos (also clinched the championship) and Yas Marina. Used for two years by Mercedes GP as a demonstrator car in silver livery. Later stripped, rebuilt, and acquired by Ross Brawn in 2014. Returned to running order by D3 Racing Solutions in 2016, and then demonstrated by Martin Brundle at that year's Goodwood Festival of Speed. In driveable condition as of 2019, when it was demonstrated by Barrichello and Anthony Davidson at the Goodwood Festival of Speed, and by Button at the British Grand Prix. It was demonstrated in 2026 by Button at the 83rd Goodwood Members' meeting on both the Saturday and Sunday.
BGP 001/03	Taken to the early races and kept in the truck ostensibly as a spare car, but not then fitted, or capable of being fitted, with a Mercedes engine. Raced by Barrichello to a win at Monza, and also previously at Spa-Francorchamps and later at Marina Bay, Suzuka, Interlagos (also pole position) and Yas Marina. Retained by Mercedes GP, which later used it as a show car in silver livery. Not running as of 2019. On loan to the Silverstone Museum as of 2025, back in Brawn GP livery but with plaid trim in the cockpit (similar to that of Mercedes-Benz Formula One cars of the 1950s).

All three chassis were used by Mercedes GP for some time as demonstrator/show cars. One of them (the sources do not indicate which one) was demonstrated by Nick Heidfeld and Nico Rosberg in silver livery at the Goodwood Festival of Speed in 2010.

== Complete Formula One results ==
(key) (results in bold indicate pole position; results in italics indicate fastest lap)

Year	Entrant	Engine	Tyres	Drivers	Grands Prix																	Points	WCC
Year	Entrant	Engine	Tyres	Drivers	AUS	MAL^{‡}	CHN	BHR	ESP	MON	TUR	GBR	GER	HUN	EUR	BEL	ITA	SIN	JPN	BRA	ABU	Points	WCC
2009	Brawn GP F1 Team	Mercedes FO108W V8	**B**	(United Kingdom) Jenson Button	**1**	**1**	3	1	**1**	**1**	1	6	5	7	7	Ret	2	5	8	5	3	**172**	**1st**
2009	Brawn GP F1 Team	Mercedes FO108W V8	**B**	(Brazil) Rubens Barrichello	2	5	4	5	2	2	Ret	3	6	10	1	7	1	6	7	**8**	4	**172**	**1st**

^{‡} Half points awarded as less than 75% of race distance completed.

Awards
Preceded by McLaren MP4-23	Autosport; Racing Car Of The Year; 2009	Succeeded by Red Bull RB6
