= Mercedes MGP W02 =

Formula One racing automobile

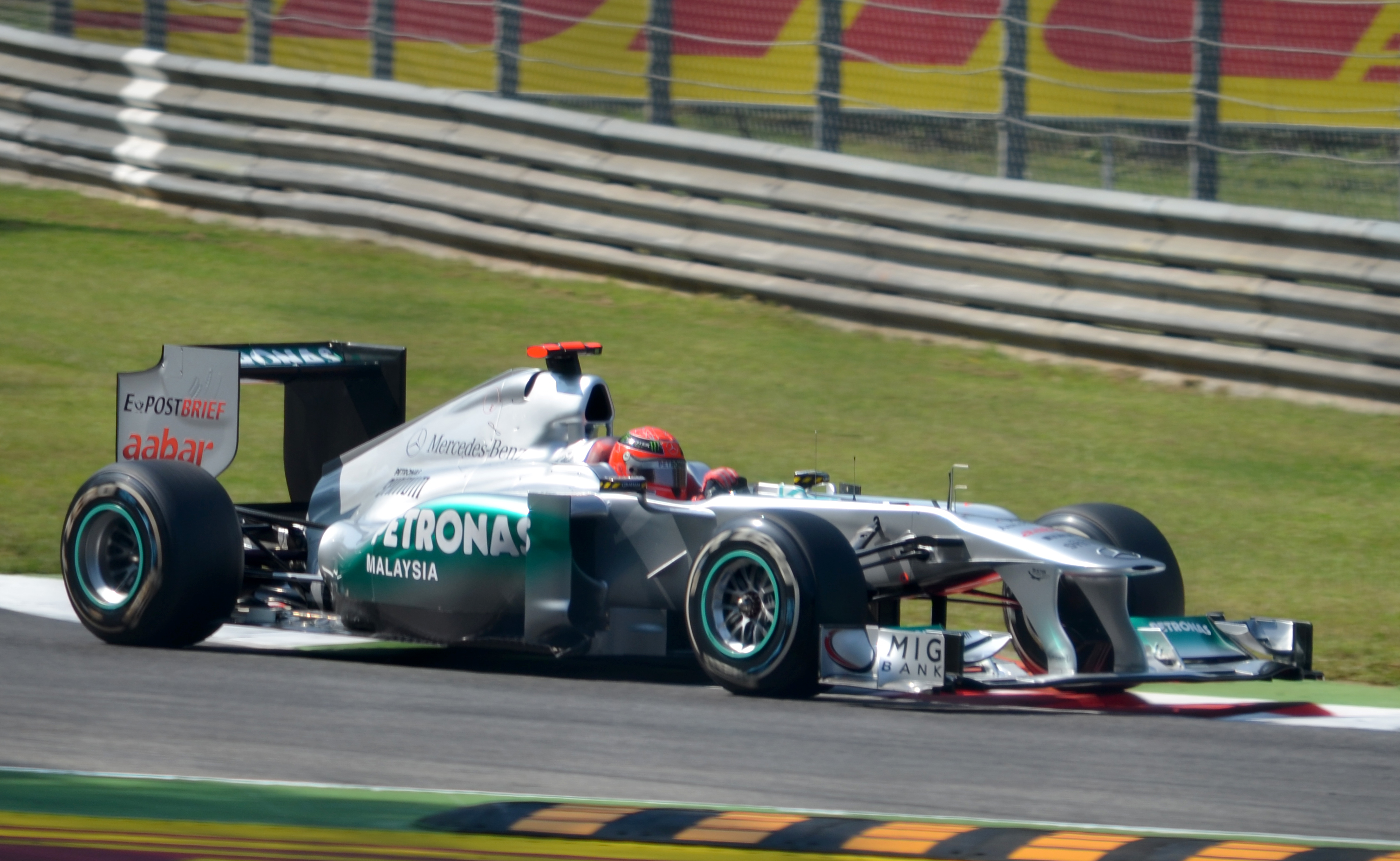
- The MGP W02, driven by Michael Schumacher at the Italian Grand Prix
- Category: Formula One
- Constructor: Mercedes
- Designers: Ross Brawn (Technical Director); John Owen (Chief Designer); Craig Wilson (Head of Vehicle Engineering); Loïc Serra (Chief Vehicle Dynamicist); Russell Cooley (Chief Engineer); Loïc Bigois (Head of Aerodynamics); David Jeffrey (Deputy Head of Aerodynamics); Ben Wood (Chief Aerodynamicist)
- Predecessor: Mercedes MGP W01
- Successor: Mercedes F1 W03

Technical specifications
- Chassis: Moulded carbon-fibre and honeycomb composite monocoque
- Suspension (front): Wishbone and pushrod activated torsion springs and rockers
- Suspension (rear): Wishbone and pullrod
- Engine: Mercedes-Benz FO 108Y 2.4 L (146 cu in) 90° V8, limited to 18,000 RPM, Naturally aspirated with KERS, mid-mounted
- Transmission: Jointly Xtrac 1044 with Mercedes AMG housing seven-speed semi-automatic carbon-fibre sequential gearbox with reverse gear hydraulic activation hand-operated, seamless shift
- Weight: 640 kg (1,411 lb) (including driver)
- Fuel: Petronas Primax
- Lubricants: Petronas Syntium
- Tyres: Pirelli P Zero; BBS Wheels (front and rear): 13"

Competition history
- Notable entrants: Mercedes GP Petronas F1 Team
- Notable drivers: 7. (Germany) Michael Schumacher; 8. (Germany) Nico Rosberg
- Debut: 2011 Australian Grand Prix
- Last event: 2011 Brazilian Grand Prix
Races	Wins	Podiums	Poles	F/Laps
19	0	0	0	0

The Mercedes MGP W02 (commonly abbreviated as the Mercedes W02) is a Formula One racing car, the second car designed and built by Mercedes Grand Prix. The car was driven by seven-time World Drivers' Champion Michael Schumacher and Nico Rosberg in the 2011 Formula One season. The car was unveiled at the Circuit Ricardo Tormo in Valencia, Spain on 1 February 2011. Two days before the car was unveiled, Mercedes released a render of the car showing a more traditional approach to the airbox than the one Mercedes used on the MGP W01 chassis and a darker silver livery. Both Schumacher and Rosberg drove the car on the first day of the Valencia tests.

== Season summary ==
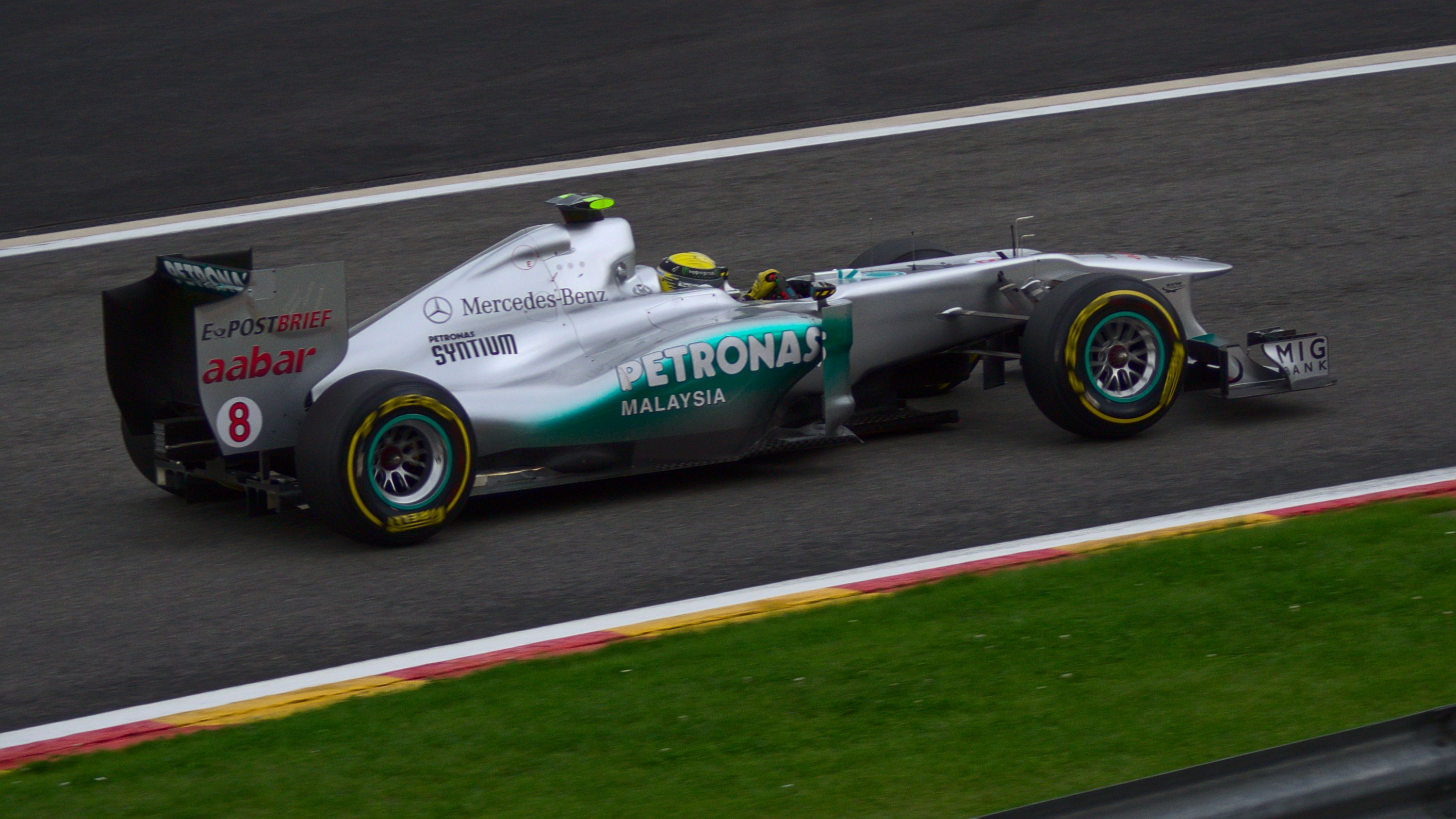
Rosberg at the Belgian Grand Prix

As of 2026, the Mercedes MGP W02 is the only Mercedes F1 car that failed to score a podium finish. Schumacher achieved his best result with a fourth-place finish in Canadian Grand Prix, with two fifth-places finish at the Chinese Grand Prix and the Turkish Grand Prix for Rosberg.

== Sponsorship and livery ==
The W02 was once again predominantly silver. However, the matte silver paintwork of the previous year was replaced by a glossier, brighter shade of silver. The sidepods, as well as parts of the front and rear wings, were again finished in cyan—a nod to the team's primary sponsor, Petronas. Other sponsors featured on the car included Aabar, Autonomy, MIG Bank and Henri Lloyd among others.

In Australia, the team included a We Pray for Japan logo on the nosecone due to the Tōhoku earthquake and tsunami.

== Complete Formula One results ==
(key) (results in bold indicate pole position; results in italics indicate fastest lap)

Year	Entrant	Engine	Tyres	Drivers	1	2	3	4	5	6	7	8	9	10	11	12	13	14	15	16	17	18	19	Points	WCC
2011	Mercedes GP Petronas	Mercedes FO108Y 2.4 V8	**P**		AUS	MAL	CHN	TUR	ESP	MON	CAN	EUR	GBR	GER	HUN	BEL	ITA	SIN	JPN	KOR	IND	ABU	BRA	**165**	**4th**
2011	Mercedes GP Petronas	Mercedes FO108Y 2.4 V8	**P**	(Germany) Michael Schumacher	Ret	9	8	12	6	Ret	4	17	9	8	Ret	5	5	Ret	6	Ret	5	7	15	**165**	**4th**
2011	Mercedes GP Petronas	Mercedes FO108Y 2.4 V8	**P**	(Germany) Nico Rosberg	Ret	12	5	5	7	11	11	7	6	7	9	6	Ret	7	10	8	6	6	7	**165**	**4th**
