= Mercedes-Benz W196 =

Formula One racing automobile

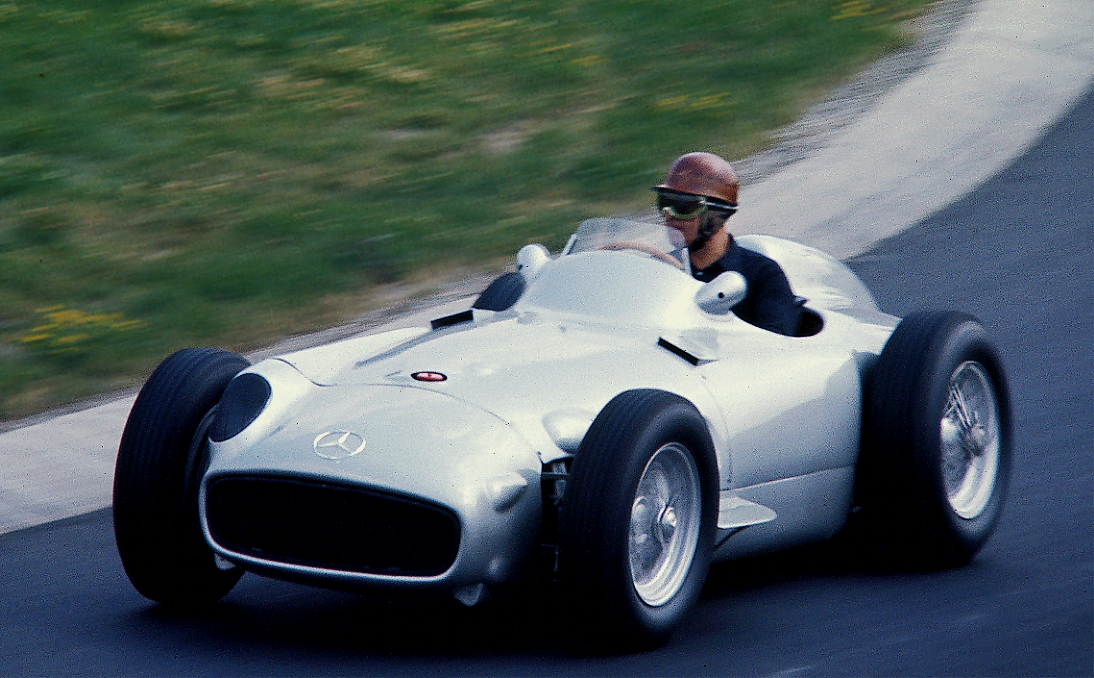
- Karl Kling driving the W196 at the Nürburgring in 1976
- Category: Formula One
- Constructor: Mercedes
- Designer: Rudolf Uhlenhaut
- Predecessor: Mercedes-Benz W195
- Successor: Mercedes MGP W01

Technical specifications
- Engine: Mercedes-Benz M196 2,497 cc (152.4 cu in) I8 naturally aspirated
- Tyres: Continental

Competition history
- Notable entrants: Daimler Benz AG
- Notable drivers: (Argentina) Juan Manuel Fangio (United Kingdom) Stirling Moss (Germany) Hans Herrmann (Germany) Karl Kling
- Debut: 1954 French Grand Prix
- First win: 1954 French Grand Prix
- Last win: 1955 Italian Grand Prix
- Last event: 1955 Italian Grand Prix
Races	Wins	Podiums	Poles	F/Laps
12	9	17	8	9
- Constructors' Championships: 0
- Drivers' Championships: 2 (1954, 1955)

The Mercedes-Benz W196 (sometimes written as the Mercedes-Benz W 196 R) was a Formula One racing car produced by Mercedes-Benz for the 1954 and 1955 F1 seasons. Successor to the W194 300 SL sportscar and to the W195 1500cc supercharged V12 concept, in the hands of Juan Manuel Fangio and Stirling Moss it won 9 of 12 races entered and captured both world championships in which it competed.

Firsts included the use of desmodromic valves and Daimler-Benz developed mechanical direct fuel injection adapted from the DB 601 high-performance V12 used on the Messerschmitt Bf 109E fighter during World War II.

The 3-litre 300 SLR was derived from the W196 for the 1955 World Sportscar Championship season. Its crash at Le Mans that year ended not only its own short-lived domination but also spelled the end for the W196. Mercedes pulled out of competitive racing in 1955 and did not return for another three decades.

== Types ==
=== Monza ===
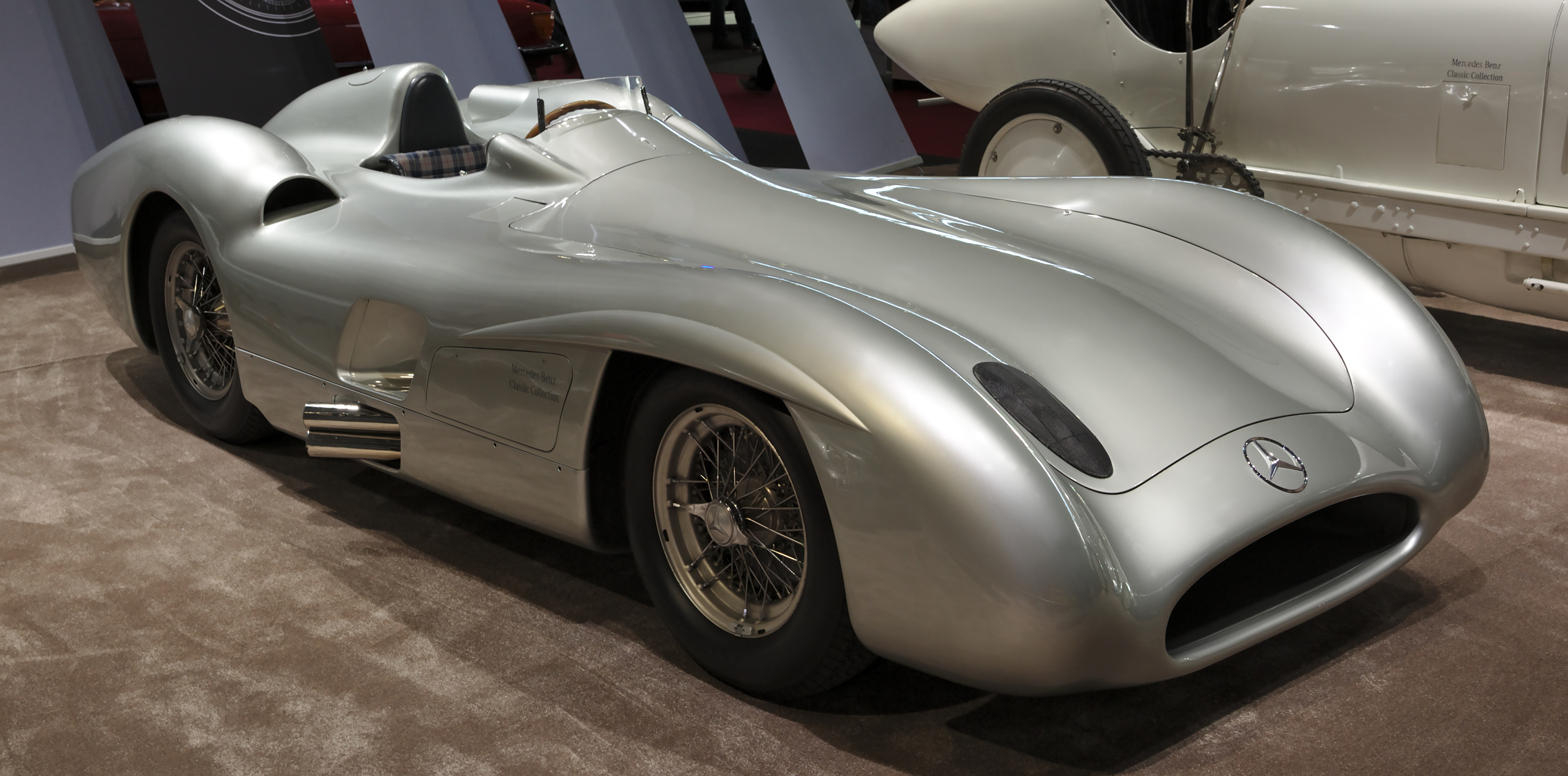
Streamlined Type Monza bodywork

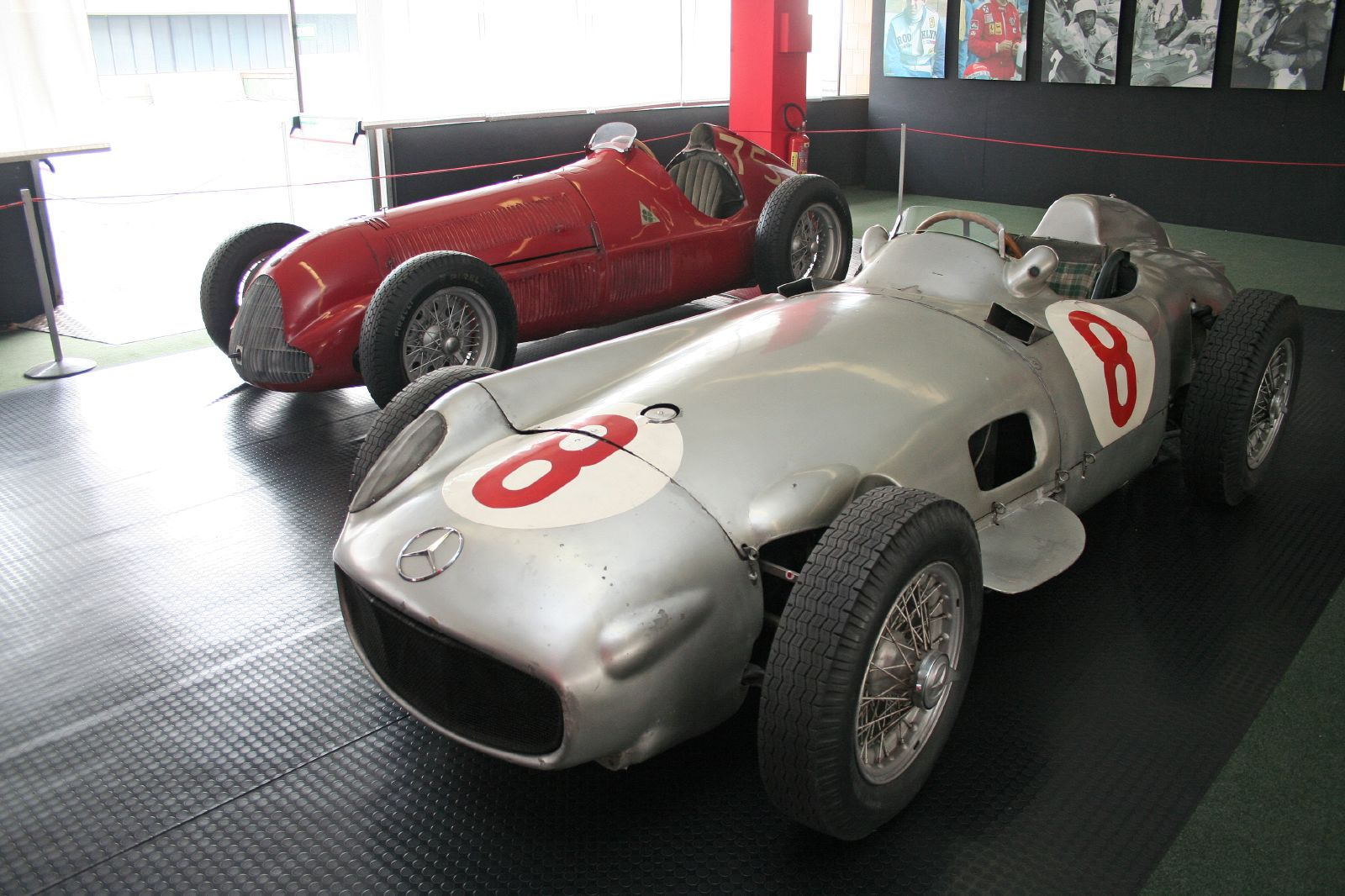
Mercedes W196 (Alfa 159 in background)

The W196's delayed debut at the 1954 French Grand Prix saw the introduction of the aerodynamic closed-wheel aluminium "Type Monza" streamliner body for the high speed track at Reims. Juan Manuel Fangio and Karl Kling claimed a 1–2 finish, and Hans Herrmann posted the fastest lap. The same body was later used only three more times: in the 1954 season at the British Grand Prix at Silverstone and the Italian Grand Prix at Monza, where it picked up its nickname, and in the 1955 season again at the Italian Grand Prix at Monza.

In total the "Type Monza" won three races (the 1954 French Grand Prix, 1954 and 1955 Italian Grand Prix), all with Fangio at the wheel. These three Grands Prix have remained the only races won by a closed-wheel car in Formula One history.

=== Open wheel ===
Attractive as the Monza was, its streamlined body was really only suited to high-speed tracks made up of straights and slow corners, leading to defeat at its second race, the British Grand Prix at the high-speed corner dominated Silverstone circuit, where Fangio hit a number of oil barrels that marked out the circuit. A conventional open-wheel-version was introduced for the most important race on the calendar for Mercedes, the German Grand Prix at the twisty and long Nürburgring. Fangio, who had already won the first two GPs of 1954 with a Maserati in his home city of Buenos Aires and at Spa, won this and the two following GPs in Switzerland with the 'open wheel' version and Italy, as said, on the closed-wheel streamlined 'Type Monza', securing his 2nd World Championship.

At the Spanish Grand Prix in Barcelona, the last race of the 1954 season the low-mounted Mercedes air-intake clogged with leaves, costing the race to Mike Hawthorn in a Ferrari, and leading to the intake's relocation atop the hood.

In the shortened 1955 Formula One season, abbreviated after the Le Mans disaster, the W196 won every race except the Monaco Grand Prix, where Hans Herrmann crashed in practice and the other three team Mercedes cars failed to finish. A highlight for driver Stirling Moss was his finish 0.2 seconds ahead of stable mate Fangio at his home event, the British Grand Prix, his first GP win, a race where Mercedes romped home with a 1–2–3–4 finish.

After capturing the two world championships it competed in, Mercedes withdrew from motorsport at the end of the 1955 season. Despite its strong reliability and good track performance, drivers Fangio and Moss described the car in MotorSport magazine as being "a bit difficult to drive, with a tendency for snap oversteer". Moss also later said that "I'm surprised that the Merc wasn't a little bit easier to drive, because it wasn't. It was a driver's car, but not an easy car to drive." Fangio shared similar feelings, also saying in MotorSport Magazine in 1979 that the car was "not so nice to drive as a Maserati 250F, but you were almost sure to finish. So the Mercedes was incredible in that way." 1970s/80s Formula One driver John Watson drove the W196 at Hockenheim, providing some insight as to why the car was difficult to drive. He said that "if you gave this car wider and grippier tyres and altered the suspension to suit, then the handling would be of a very high order indeed." The W196 was so advanced and ahead of its time, that the narrow tyres available at the time simply could not fully handle the car's exceptional performance and potential.

== Engine ==
1954 Mercedes-Benz W196
Mercedes-Benz W196 driven by Stirling Moss at Goodwood Festival of Speed 2009

The new 1954 Formula One rules allowed a choice of naturally aspirated engines – up to 2.5 litres or 0.75 litres supercharged. The expected target range for competitive engines was 250 to 300 bhp (190 to 220 kW).

Mercedes' 1939 2-stage supercharged 1.5-litre, bore/stroke: 64 mm (2.5 in) × 58 mm (2.3 in) V8 (1,493 cc or 91.1 cu in) gave 278 bhp (207 kW) at 8,250 rpm with about 2.7 atm (270 kPa) pressure. Halving this would have only produced 139 bhp (104 kW).

Studies by Mercedes showed that 390 bhp (290 kW) at 10,000 rpm could be achieved from 0.75 litres with a supercharger pressure of 4.4 atm (450 kPa), with 100 hp (75 kW) required to drive the supercharger. Fuel consumption of this 290 bhp (220 kW) net engine would have been 2.3 times higher than a naturally aspirated one developing the same power. Since 115 bhp/L (86 kW/L) at 9,000 rpm was being developed by naturally aspirated motorcycle racing engines, it was decided that a 2.5-litre engine was the correct choice. This was a significant change of philosophy, since all previous Mercedes-Benz Grand Prix engines since the 1920s had been supercharged. Mercedes' solution was to adapt the direct fuel injection that Daimler-Benz engineers had refined on the DB 601 high-performance V12 used on the Messerschmitt Bf 109E fighter.

By its introduction at the 1954 French GP the 2,496.87 cc (152.368 cu in) bore/stroke: 76 mm (3.0 in) × 68.8 mm (2.71 in) desmodromic valves straight 8 delivered 257 bhp (192 kW). The W196 was the only F1 car with such advanced fuel technology, giving it a considerable advantage over the other carburetted engines. Variable length inlet tracts were experimented with and four wheel drive considered. An eventual 340 bhp (250 kW) at 10,000 rpm was targeted for the 2.5-litre F1 motor.

== Chassis and suspension ==
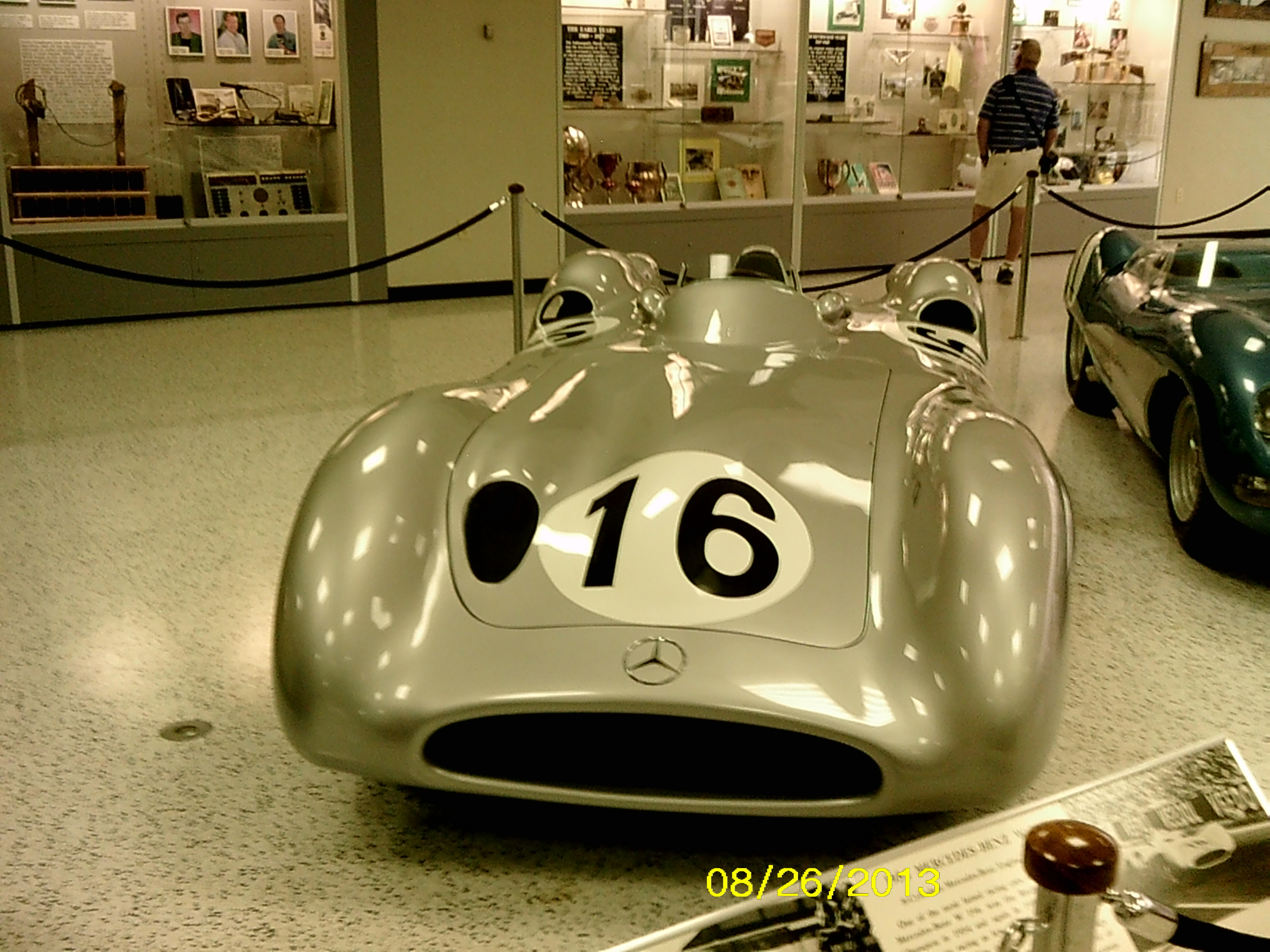
A 1954 Mercedes W196 on display at the Indianapolis Motor Speedway's Hall of Fame and Museum

The W196 was front mid-engined, with its long longitudinally mounted engine placed just behind the front axles instead of over them to better balance front/rear weight distribution. A welded aluminium tube spaceframe chassis carried ultra-light Elektron magnesium-alloy bodywork (having a specific gravity of 1.8, less than a quarter of iron's 7.8), which contributed substantially to keeping dry weight down.

To enhance stopping power extra wide diameter drum brakes too large to fit inside 16" wheel rims were used, mounted inboard with short half shafts and two universal joints per wheel. Torsion bars fitted inside the frame's tubes were used in the double wishbone front. To prevent cornering forces from raising the car, as occurs with short swing axles, the rear used a low-roll center system featuring off-centered beams spanning from each hub to the opposite side of the chassis crossing one-another over the centerline. Nevertheless, snap-oversteer could still be a notable problem at speed.

== W196S ==
The Mercedes-Benz 300 SLR (W196S) was a 2-seat, 3-litre sports racer derived in 1955 from the W196 R F1 car, sharing most of its drivetrain, chassis, and Mercedes-Benz M196 engine. To compete in the 1955 World Sportscar Championship season, the W196's fuel-injected 2,496.87 cc straight 8 was bored and stroked to 2,981.70 cc. Despite reduction of compression and use of regular gas, the power output remained roughly the same, but at lower revs and with higher reliability. The sports cars were supposed to succeed in endurance racing that last up to 24 hours. The 3.0 engines were successfully tested in the Formula Libre 1955 Buenos Aires Grand Prix that followed the 1955 Argentine Grand Prix and the 1955 1000 km Buenos Aires sports cars race in January 1955. Mercedes did not compete in the 1000km sportscar race there in Buenos Aires.

The W196's monoposto driving position was modified to standard two-abreast seating, headlights were added, and a few other changes made to adapt a strictly track competitor to a 24-hour road/track sports racer, like a trunk for two spare wheels which was locked by a handle that also served as D sign, the required International vehicle registration code for road legal cars.

At the second overseas race of the season, the 1955 12 Hours of Sebring in March, neither Mercedes nor Ferrari factory teams were present, with a Jaguar taking the win, but only the 4 best results of the 6 race season would count anyway.

On 1 May of 1955, the 300 SLR or W196S took sportscar racing by storm, winning the 1955 Mille Miglia in record time of just over 10 hours. For the 1955 24 Hours of Le Mans race, where cars would reach very high speeds and had to brake for tight corners of Mulsanne and Indianapolis, air brakes were added to reduce the fading of drum brakes that most brands still used, except Jaguar which already had adopted disc brakes, won the 1953 race, and came 2nd in 1954. Mercedes led the 24h race, but due to the catastrophic crash and fire of the 1955 Le Mans disaster, retired the remaining cars in the night from positions 1 and 3. There was a three month summer break in the World Championship calendar, which Mercedes used to race the 300 SLR at Nürburgring and in Sweden with two wins. Another two wins at Dundrod and the 1955 Targa Florio secured the World Championship.

== W196R sale ==
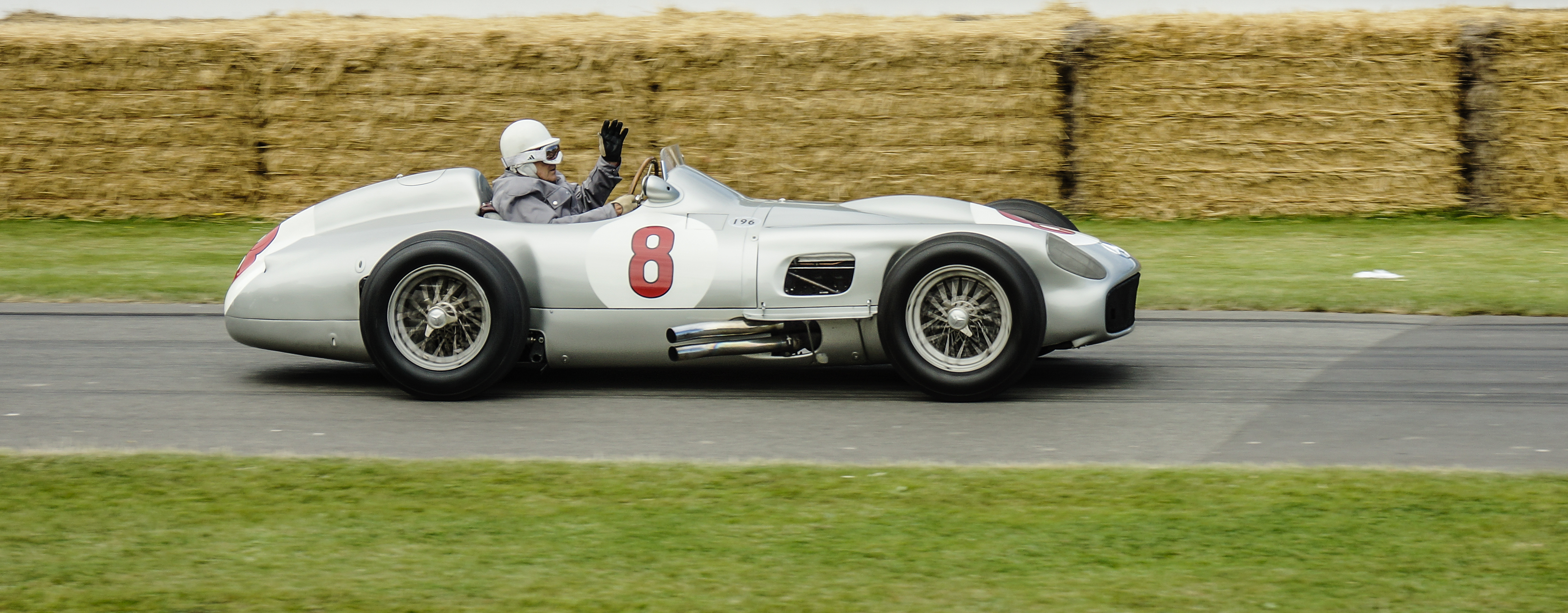
Stirling Moss presenting a W196R at the 2014 Goodwood Festival of Speed

The auction house Bonhams – in its Goodwood Festival of Speed Sale on 12 July 2013 – sold Mercedes-Benz W196R Chassis no. 196 010 00006/54 for a new World Record £19.7-million Sterling ($29.6 million, incl. auction premium). The total bill, including UK VAT on commission charged, came to £20,896,800.00 Sterling. This high price was achieved in recognition of the fact that Chassis no. 196 010 00006/54 is the only example of the model available in private hands – all its surviving sisters being in original manufacturer or institutional museum hands. This particular car is also the most successful of all surviving W196R cars – being the individual driven by Juan Manuel Fangio to win the 1954 German & European Grand Prix at the Nurburgring, and then adding a second consecutive victory in the 1954 Swiss GP at Berne's Bremgarten circuit. With that second race win, added to his early-season victories in the Argentine and Belgian GPs in a Maserati 250F, Fangio clinched the second of his ultimately five Formula 1 Drivers' World Championship titles.

== Technical data ==
Technical data	W196 R	W196 S
Engine:	Front mounted 8-cylinder in-line engine
Displacement:	2496 cm³	2983 cm³
Bore x stroke:	76 x 68.8 mm	78 x 78 mm
Max power at rpm:	257 hp at 8 250 rpm	300 hp at 7 500 rpm
Max torque at rpm:	247 Nm at 6 300 rpm	295 Nm at 5 950 rpm
Valve control:	2 overhead camshafts, 2 forced-controlled valves per cylinder
Compression:	9:1
Gearbox:	5-speed manual, transaxle
suspension front:	Double wishbones, longitudinal torsion bar, hydraulic shock absorber
suspension rear:	Single-link pendulum axle, longitudinal torsion bar, hydraulic shock absorbers
Brakes:	Hydraulic drum brakes
Chassis & body:	Space frame with Elektron magnesium-alloy body
Wheelbase:	215–235 cm
Dry weight:	About 700 kg
Top speed:	290 km/h	290 km/h

== Complete Formula One World Championship results ==
(key)

Year	Entrant	Engine	Tyres	Drivers	1	2	3	4	5	6	7	8	9
1954	Daimler Benz AG	Mercedes M196 2.5 L8	C		ARG	500	BEL	FRA	GBR	GER	SUI	ITA	ESP
1954	Daimler Benz AG	Mercedes M196 2.5 L8	C	(Argentina) Juan Manuel Fangio				1^{2}	4^{2}	1	1	1^{2}	3
1954	Daimler Benz AG	Mercedes M196 2.5 L8	C	(West Germany) Karl Kling				2^{2}	7^{2}	4	Ret	Ret^{2}	5
1954	Daimler Benz AG	Mercedes M196 2.5 L8	C	(West Germany) Hans Herrmann				Ret^{2}		Ret^{2}	3	4^{2}	Ret
1954	Daimler Benz AG	Mercedes M196 2.5 L8	C	(West Germany) Hermann Lang						Ret			
1955	Daimler Benz AG	Mercedes M196 2.5 L8	C		ARG	MON	500	BEL	NED	GBR	ITA		
1955	Daimler Benz AG	Mercedes M196 2.5 L8	C	(Argentina) Juan Manuel Fangio	1	Ret		1	1	2	1^{2}		
1955	Daimler Benz AG	Mercedes M196 2.5 L8	C	(West Germany) Karl Kling	4^{1}			Ret	Ret	3	Ret		
1955	Daimler Benz AG	Mercedes M196 2.5 L8	C	(West Germany) Hans Herrmann	4^{1}	DNQ							
1955	Daimler Benz AG	Mercedes M196 2.5 L8	C	(United Kingdom) Stirling Moss	4^{1}	9		2	2	1	Ret^{2}		
1955	Daimler Benz AG	Mercedes M196 2.5 L8	C	(France) André Simon		Ret							
1955	Daimler Benz AG	Mercedes M196 2.5 L8	C	(Italy) Piero Taruffi						4	2		

^1 Indicates shared drive.
^2 Indicates streamlined version used.

== See also ==
- Mercedes-Benz W194
- Mercedes-Benz 300 SLR (W196S)
- Mercedes-Benz in Formula One
