= Ian Wright (motorsport) =

British engineer

- Citizenship: British
- Education: University of Nottingham
- Occupation: Engineer
- Years active: 1990–2020
- Known for: Formula One engineer

Ian Wright is a British retired Formula One and motorsport engineer. He is best known for holding senior engineering positions at Sauber Motorsport, Mercedes-AMG F1 Team, Brawn GP and Honda Racing F1.

== Career ==
Wright studied physics at the University of Nottingham, graduating with a Bachelor of Science degree in 1985. He began his engineering career in the aerospace and defence sector, working as a systems engineer and later as a flight-test engineer at EASAMS on radar programmes contracted to Messerschmitt-Bölkow-Blohm in Germany. In 1990 he joined the McLaren Group as an R&D engineer, where he played a key role in introducing vehicle-performance simulation tools to the team. He led the development of analytical methods and competitor-comparison techniques that reshaped McLaren’s approach to performance analysis during the late 1990s, contributing to the team’s competitiveness and its 1998 World Championship success.

Wright moved to Brackley in 1998 to join the fledgling British American Racing team as a senior vehicle dynamics engineer, developing modelling software and analysis processes. His role later evolved into Chief Engineer – Vehicle Dynamics, overseeing the team’s vehicle dynamics, modelling, and simulation programmes. He continued in this position as the team transitioned into Honda Racing F1 and subsequently Brawn GP, and played a role in the design and development of the Brawn BGP 001. When the organisation became Mercedes-AMG F1 Team, Wright transitioned to Head of Engineering Software, where he led development of analytical toolsets used to guide car development and performance decision-making, contributing to the foundations of Mercedes’ championship-winning era from 2014 onward.

Seeking a new challenge, Wright left Formula One to join Pratt Miller in the United States as Chief Engineer of its Driving Simulator Laboratory. There he led development of a driver-in-the-loop simulator used by Chevrolet motorsport programmes in NASCAR, IndyCar, and endurance racing. He later returned to Formula One as Head of Vehicle Performance at Sauber Motorsport, leading the development and application of simulation-driven performance tools to support the team’s Formula One operations. His role subsequently evolved into Head of Vehicle Science, where he oversaw development of the team’s first driver-in-the-loop simulator capability.

Since 2021 Wright has stepped back from full-time motorsport and works part-time as an engineering consultant and running engineering education programmes.
