= Craig Wilson (engineer) =

British engineer

- Born: 21 July 1971 (age 54)
- Occupation: Engineer
- Employer: FIA
- Title: Head of vehicle performance

Craig Wilson (born 21 July 1971) is a British Formula One and motorsport engineer. He is currently the head of vehicle performance at the FIA.

== Career ==
Wilson graduated from Imperial College London in 1993 with a Master of Engineering degree in Aeronautical Engineering. During his final year, he collaborated with the Benetton Formula One team on his thesis project. He subsequently completed a Master of Science degree in Automotive Product Engineering at Cranfield University in 1994, undertaking his thesis in conjunction with Paul Stewart Racing. Following his postgraduate studies, Wilson joined Paul Stewart Racing as a Vehicle Dynamics Engineer, working on consultancy projects with the Ford Motor Company, including a seven-month secondment in the United States. In late 1995, he moved to the Tyrrell Racing as a Data Analysis Engineer, where his role expanded to include vehicle dynamics modelling, rig testing, and duties as a test team engineer.

In 1998, Wilson joined Williams Racing as a Race Engineer, initially working with Heinz-Harald Frentzen before engineering Ralf Schumacher through to the end of the 2002 season. In 2003, he moved to British American Racing as Senior Race Engineer to Jenson Button and was promoted to Chief Race Engineer at the end of that year. In this role, he assumed overall responsibility for trackside engineering operations during the team's most successful competitive period. He continued in this position following the team's transition into Honda Racing F1 Team.

In 2008, Wilson left his role on the pitwall and became Head of Vehicle Engineering and Dynamics, being responsible for all performance related activities on the car in preparation for the regulation changes for 2009. In the wake of the financial crash, Honda was sold to Ross Brawn and became Brawn GP. Wilson remained in this position as the new team went on to win both the drivers and constructors championships with the Brawn BGP 001. He stayed on as the team became Mercedes Grand Prix but later moved back to Williams in 2014 as Head of Vehicle Dynamics.

Since May 2017, Wilson has served as Head of Vehicle Performance at the Formula One Group and later the FIA, where he oversees performance-related technical regulations, data analysis, and competitive balance across the championship.
