= Cromley =

Cromley is a surname. Notable people with the surname include:

- Elizabeth Cromley, American historian
- Jennifer Cromley, American educational psychologist
- Lige Cromley (1897–1937), American actor
- Ray Cromley (1910–2007), United States Army Colonel
- Thaddeus E. Cromley (1843–1921), American politician

== See also ==
- Bromley, in London
- Crosley (disambiguation)
