= Crosley =

Crosley may refer to:

- Crosley (surname)
- Crosley Broadcasting Corporation, American broadcaster
- Crosley Building, building in Cincinnati, Ohio
- Crosley Field, baseball field in Cincinnati, Ohio
- Crosley Motors, American automobile manufacturer
- Crosley Radio, American manufacturing firm
- Crosley Radio (1921-1956), American manufacturer of radio receivers founded by Powel Crosley
- Crosley Tower, building in Cincinnati, Ohio
- USS Crosley, multiple ships

== See also ==
- Crossley, British manufacturer
