= Crosley (surname) =

Crosley is a surname. Notable people with the surname include:

- David Crosley (1670–1744), English minister
- John Crosley (1762–1817), English astronomer and mathematician
- Larry Crosley (1932–1998), American-Canadian composer
- Lewis M. Crosley (1888–1978), American industrialist and businessman
- Powel Crosley Jr. (1886–1961), American inventor, industrialist, and entrepreneur
- Sloane Crosley (born 1978), American writer
- Walter S. Crosley (1871–1939), American naval officer

== See also ==
- Crossley (name)
