= Crosley Motors =

Defunct American motor vehicle manufacturer

Crosley Motors Incorporated
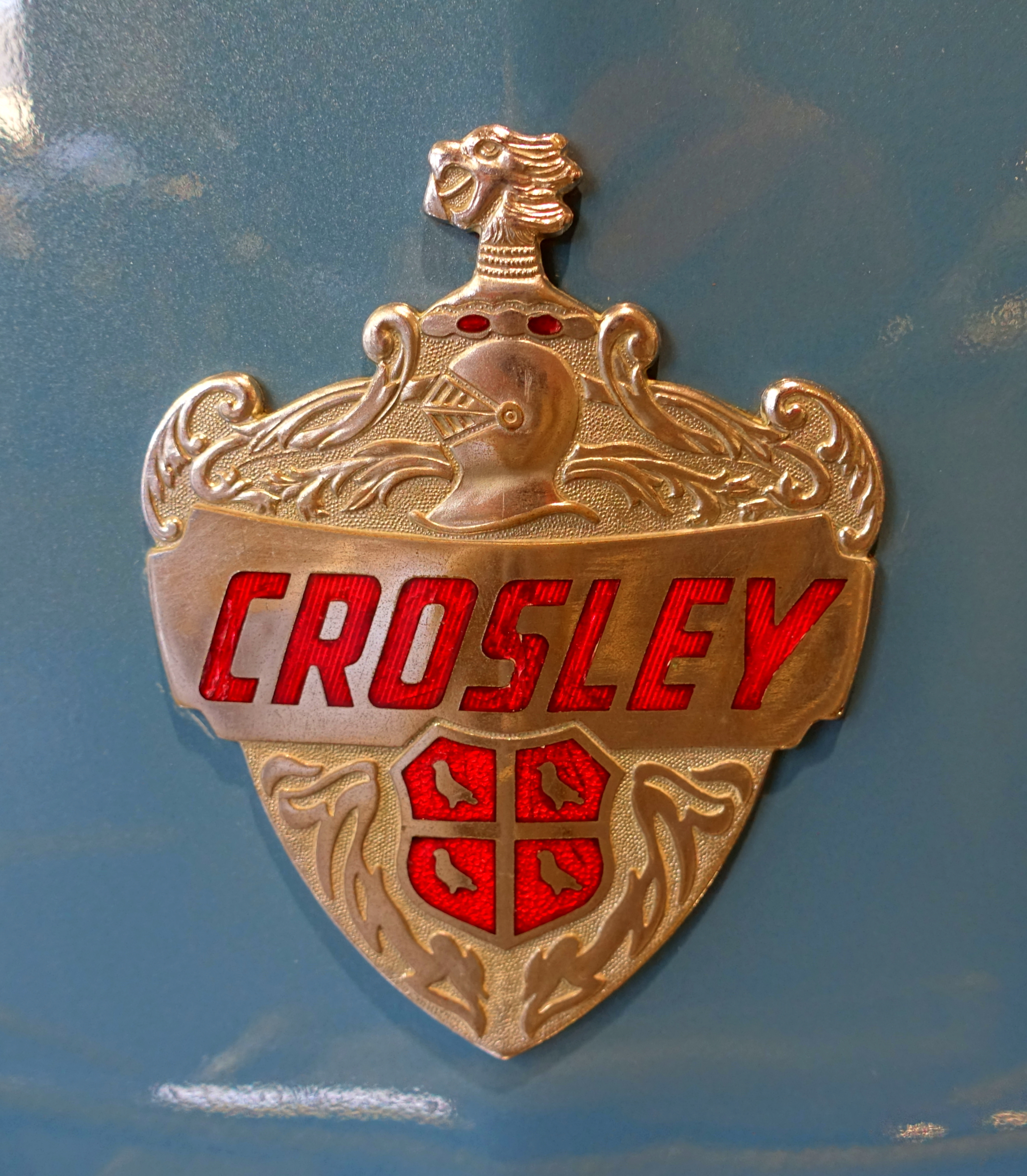
- Formerly: Crosley Corporation
- Industry: Automotive
- Founded: 1939; 87 years ago
- Founder: Powel Crosley Jr.
- Defunct: July 3, 1952; 74 years ago
- Fate: Factory in Marion, Indiana sold
- Headquarters: Cincinnati, Ohio, United States
- Key people: Lewis M. Crosley
- Products: automobiles, military vehicles

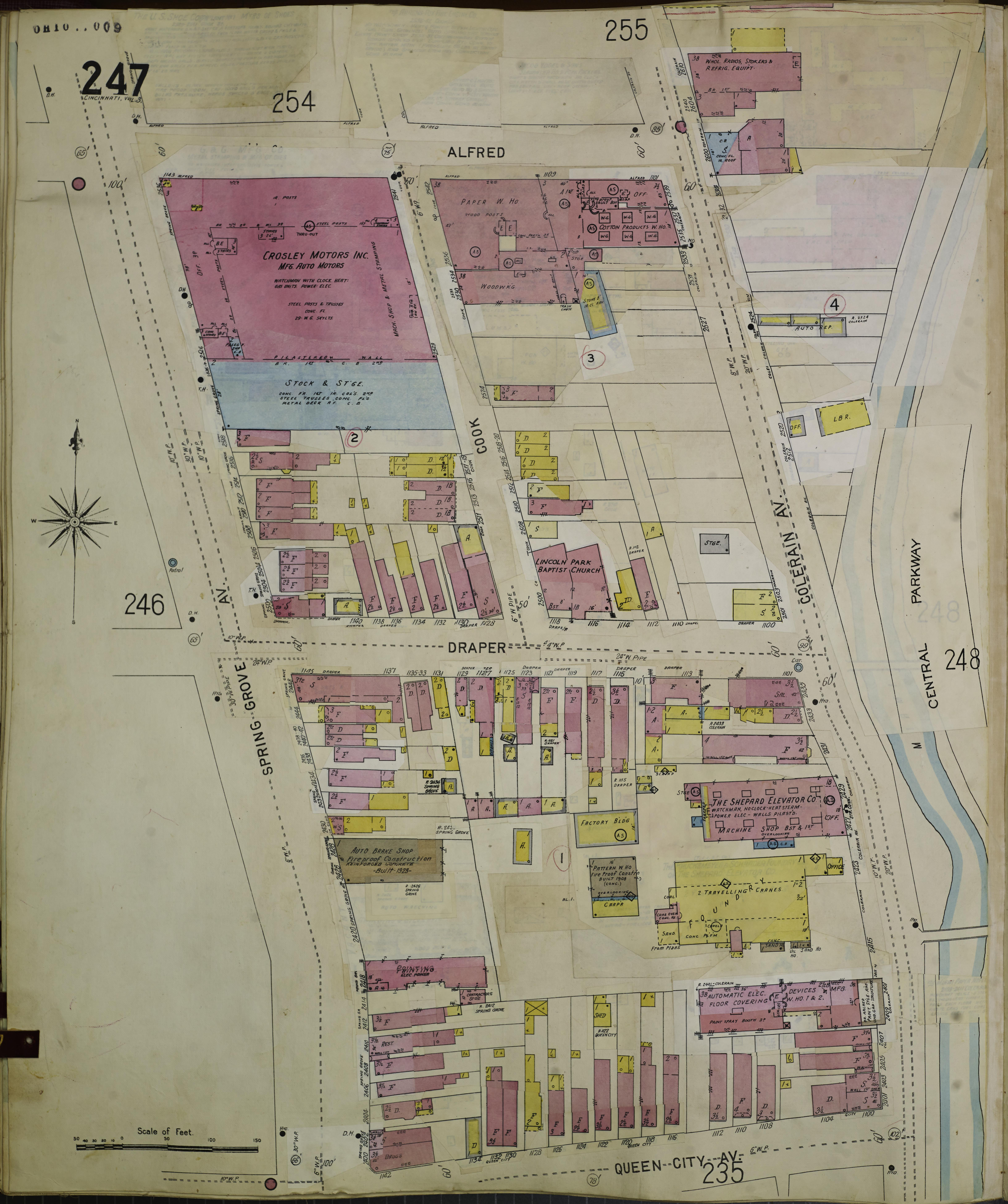
Crosley's plant (1950) in upper-left

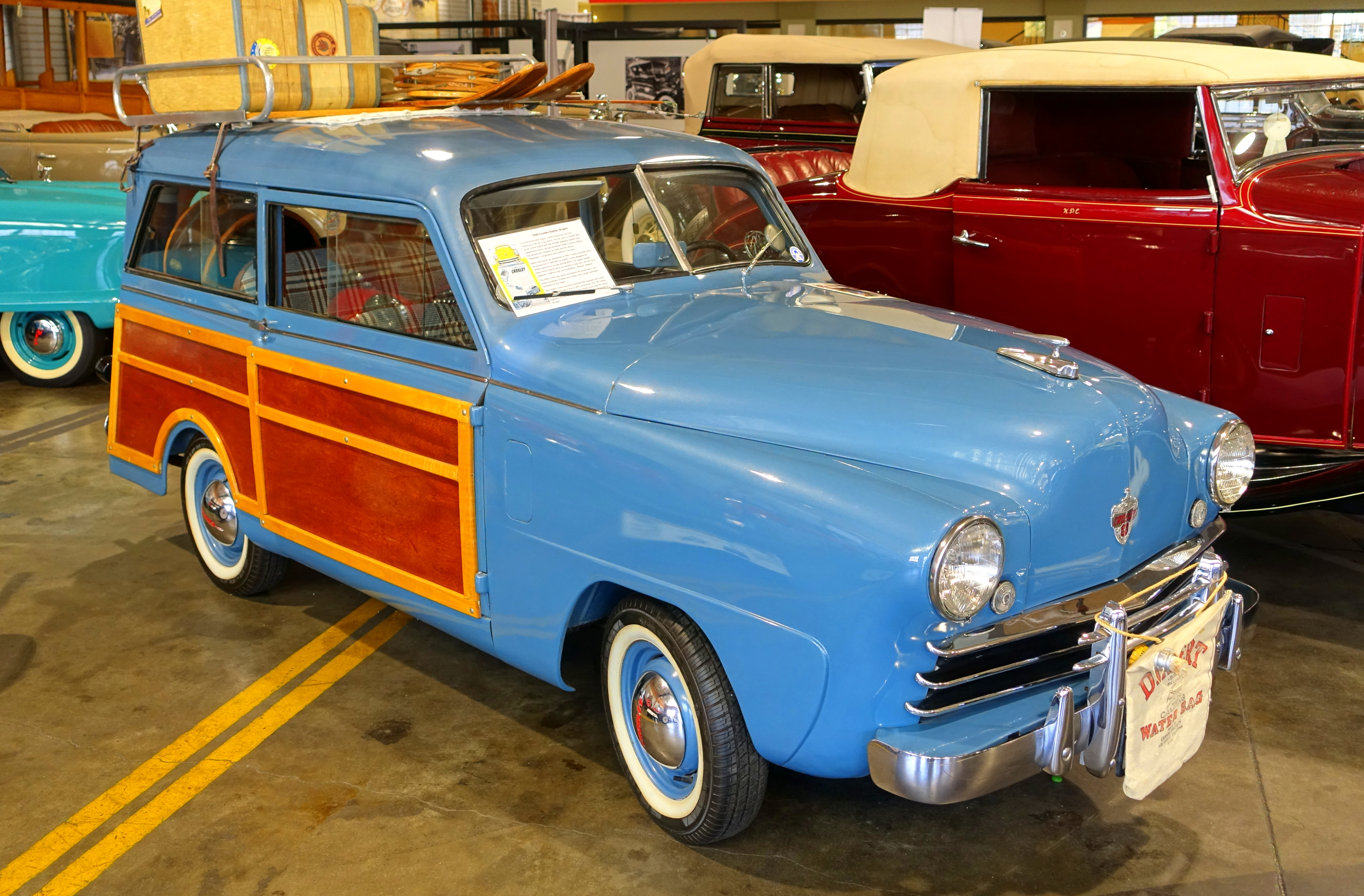
Crosley's all-steel Wagons were their best sellers (1947–1952)

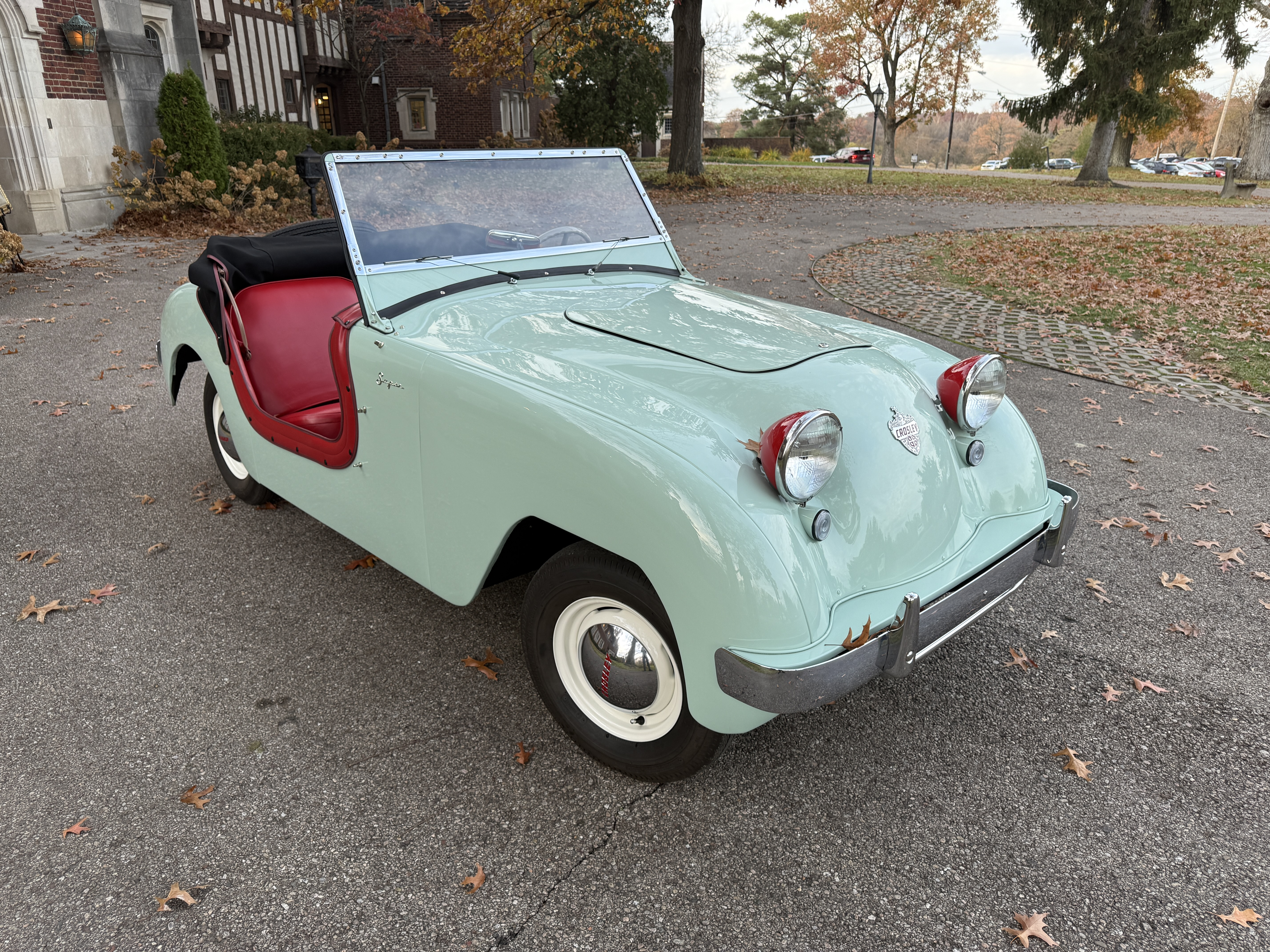
The Crosley Hotshot, introduced in 1949, was America's first post-war sports car. Shown is a 1950 Super Sports, the dressed up version of the Hotshot.

Crosley Motors Incorporated was a small, independent American manufacturer of economy cars or subcompact cars, bordering on microcars. At first called the Crosley Corporation and later Crosley Motors Incorporated, the Cincinnati, Ohio, firm was active from 1939 to 1952, interrupted by World War II production. Their station wagons were the most popular model, but also offered were sedans, pickups, convertibles, a sports car, and even a tiny jeep-like vehicle. For export, the cars were badged Crosmobile.

Crosley introduced several "firsts" in American automotive history, including the first affordable, mass-market car with an overhead camshaft engine in 1946; the first use of the term 'Sport(s-) Utility' in 1947, for a 1948 model year convertible wagon; and the first American cars to be fitted with 4-wheel caliper type disc brakes, as well as America's first post-war sports car, the Hotshot, in the 1949 model year.

All of Crosley's models were lightweight (1,100 to 1,400 pounds (500 to 640 kilograms)) body-on-frame cars with rigid axles front and rear, and engines with less than 1 litre (61 cubic inches) displacement. With exception of the late introduced Hotshot and Farm-O-Road models, the vast majority of all Crosleys were built on an 80-inch (2,000-millimeter) wheelbase, (Note: The same as the British 1959 Mini.) and with leaf-springs.

== History ==
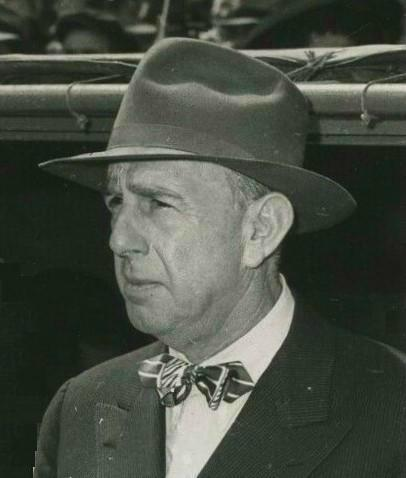
Powel Crosley Jr. ca. 1940

Powel Crosley Jr. made his fortune in the automotive parts and accessories business, before diversifying into manufacturing other consumer products and Crosley automobiles in the 1920s and 1930s. In 1925 his company became the largest manufacturer of radios in the world. The financial success of his manufacturing and radio broadcasting businesses provided the funds for Crosley to pursue his lifelong interest in manufacturing automobiles. He introduced the first Crosley compact car in 1939.

During World War II the Crosley company discontinued civilian automobile manufacturing and began production of war-time materials, including development of experimental vehicles. In 1946 Crosley resumed production of compact and subcompact vehicles at its facility in Marion, Indiana, in addition to introducing new models and innovations to its offerings. After gas rationing was discontinued and the Big Three car makers began producing larger cars, consumer interest in Crosley's compact cars declined. The last Crosley car rolled off the assembly line on July 3, 1952, and the company focused on its other, more successful business ventures.

=== Developer and company founder ===
Industrialist Powel Crosley Jr. of Cincinnati, Ohio, owner of Crosley Broadcasting Corporation and the Cincinnati Reds baseball team, among other business interests, had ambitious plans to build subcompact cars. Crosley had built his first automobile at the age of twelve, and in 1907, at the age of twenty-one, formed Marathon Six Automotive in Connersville, Indiana. Crosley built a prototype of the "Marathon Six," a six-cylinder automobile priced at US$1,700, which was at the low end of the luxury car market, but failed to fund its production.

After working for several auto manufacturers in Indianapolis and Muncie, Indiana, and several more failed attempts to manufacture his own cars, including a cycle car model, Crosley found success in manufacturing automobile accessories as cofounder with Ira J. Cooper of the American Automobile Accessory Company in 1916, and bought out Cooper's interest in the company. By 1919, Crosley and his younger brother and business partner, Lewis M. Crosley, had sold more than $1 million in parts and were diversifying into other consumer products.

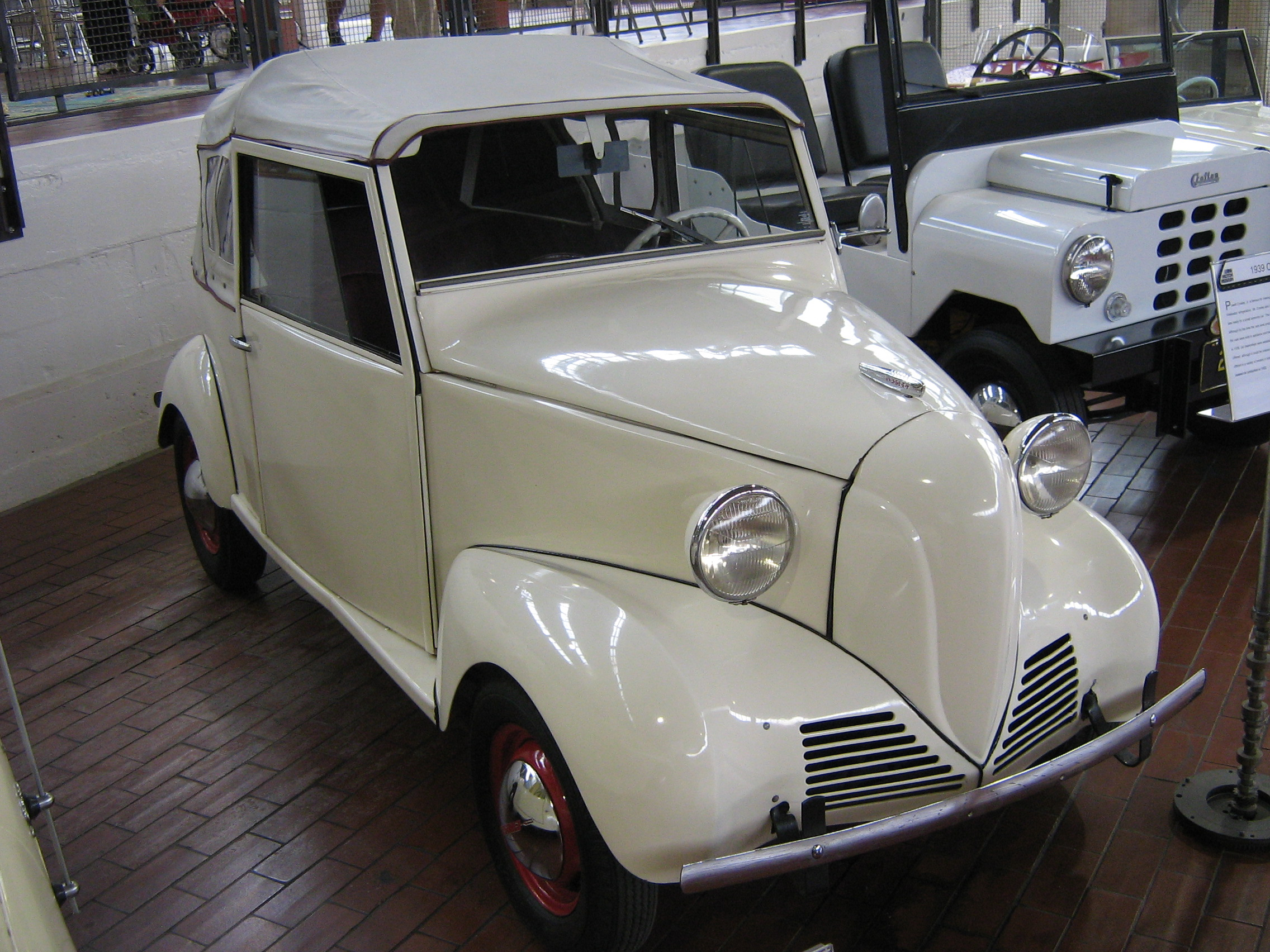
1939 Crosley convertible

1942 Crosley CB-42 Liberty Sedan

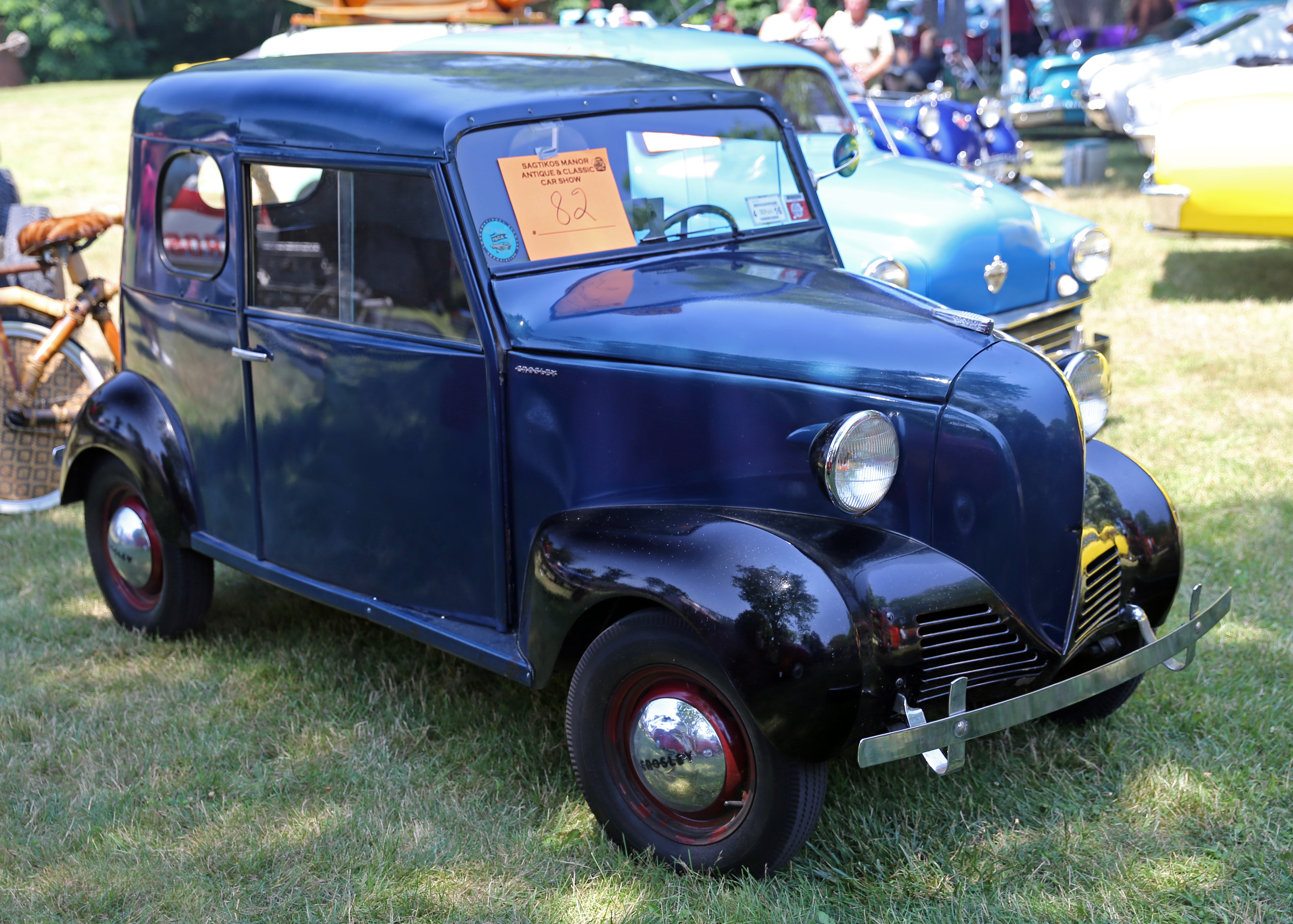
First year for metal roof models (front right)

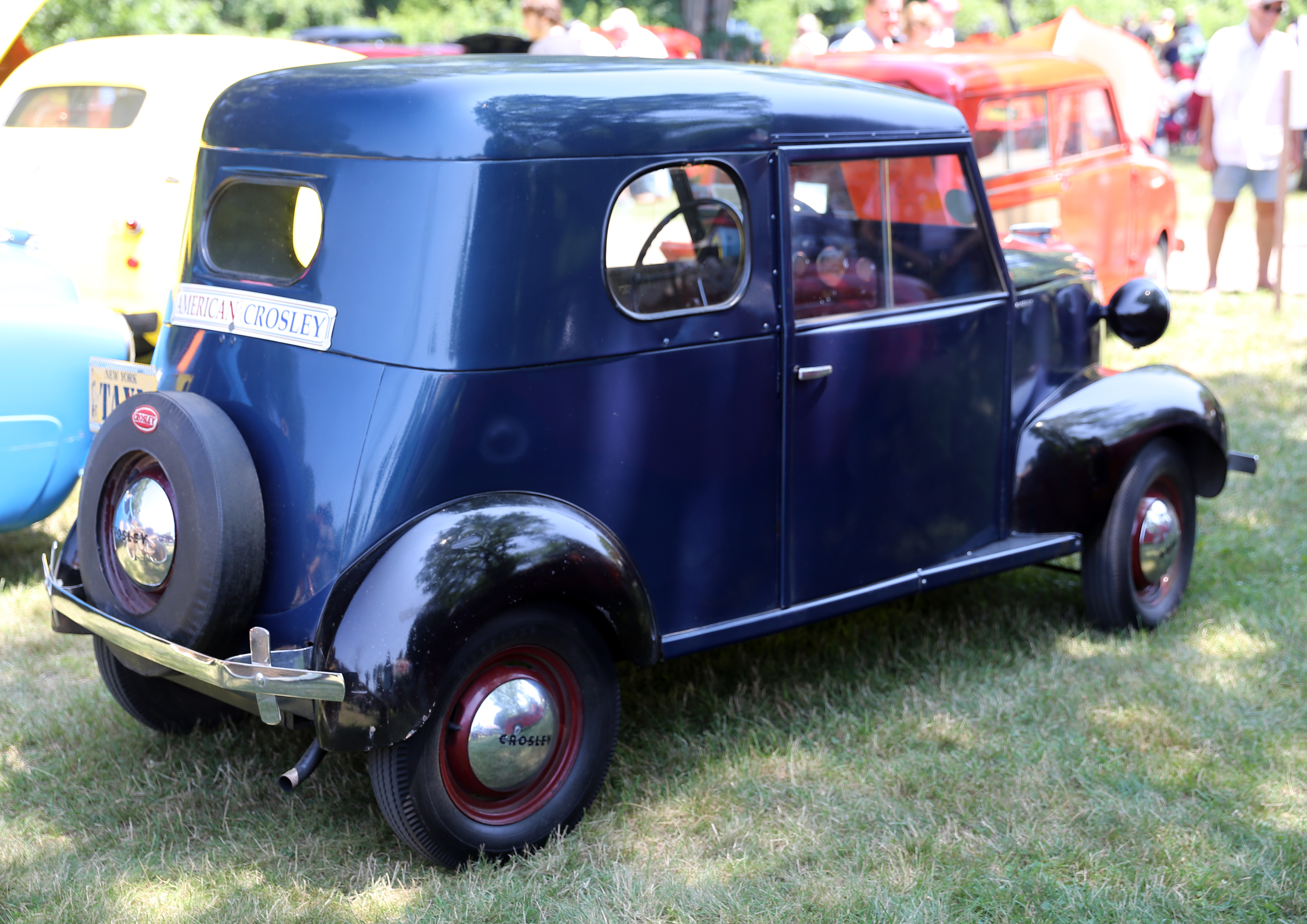
rear right

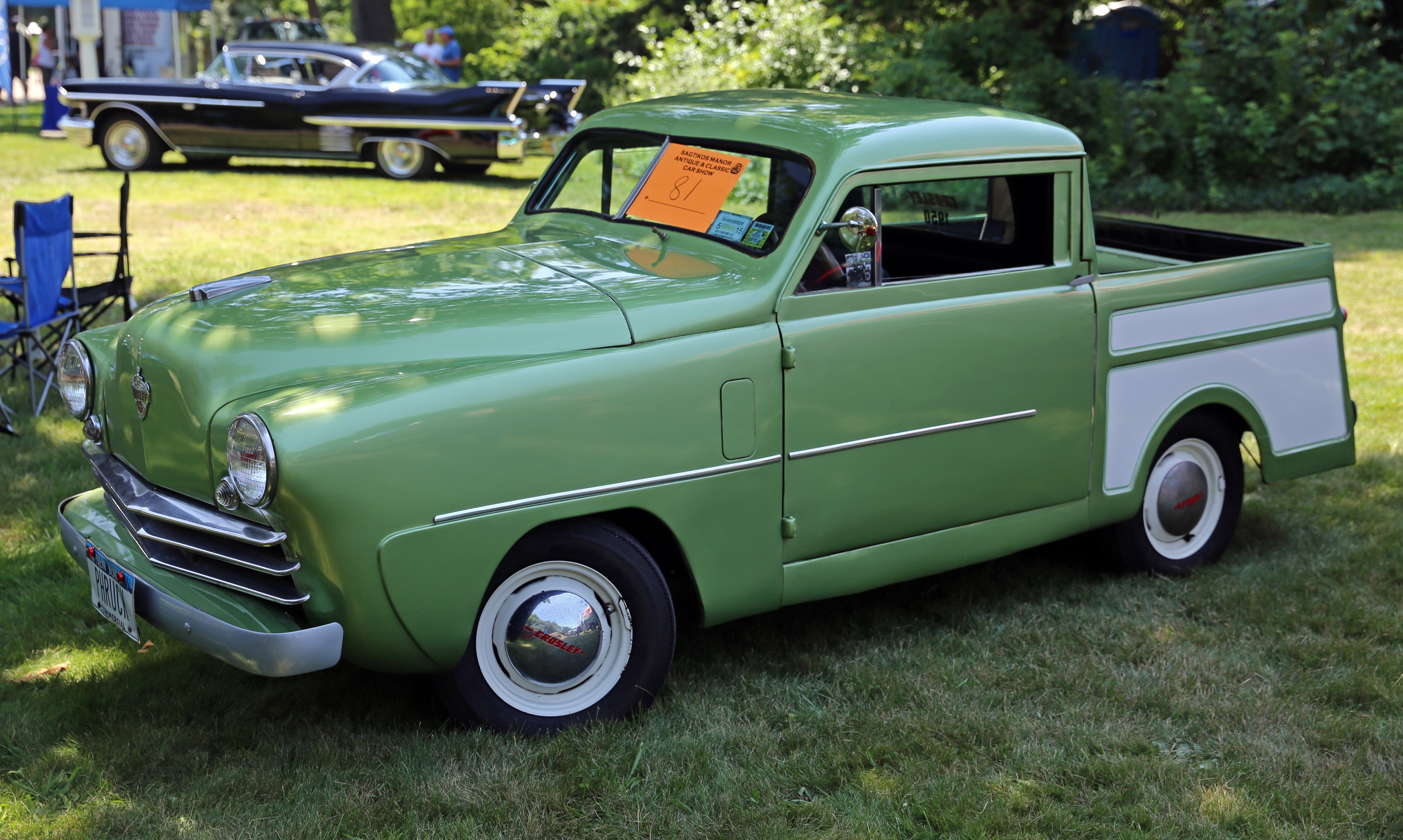
1950 Crosley CD pickup

Crosley increased his fortune in the 1920s and 1930s by developing, manufacturing, and selling inexpensive radios, such as the "Harko", the Crosley "Pup" and the "Roamio" models. The Crosley Radio Corporation became the world's largest radio manufacturer in 1925. It expanded operations at Camp Washington, a Cincinnati neighborhood, and began commercial radio broadcasting with WLW radio, considered "the Nation's Station." Crosley's company also introduced new consumer products and home appliances in the 1930s, including the "Shelvador," a refrigerator that had shelves in the doors, and other product innovations. The wealth that Crosley amassed from sales of these products provided the funds to diversify into other areas, including automobile manufacturing.

=== First Crosley automobiles ===
Beginning in the late 1930s Crosley developed low-priced compact cars and other pint-size vehicles. The first experimental prototype of the Crosley car was the 1937 CRAD (for Crosley Radio Auto Division) that had an 18 inches (46 cm) rear track. With the assistance of his brother, Lewis, a graduate engineer, Crosley also designed assembly plants for his manufacturing operations at Richmond and Marion, Indiana.

On April 28, 1939, the first Crosley production car debuted at the Indianapolis Motor Speedway to mixed reviews. It was a two-door convertible that weighed under 1,000 pounds (450 kg). Initially offered at US$325 for a two-passenger coupe or $350 for a four-passenger sedan, (Note: The two models were essentially the same car, except the sedan had rear side windows.) the Crosley cars were cheaper than the nearest competition, the American Austin Car Company's American Bantam, which sold for $449 to $565.

The Crosley car's chassis had an 80-inch (2,032 mm) wheelbase and used beam axles with leaf-springs (half-elliptic springs in front, and quarter-elliptic springs in the rear). Under the hood, a 4 US gal (15 L) gravity-fed fuel-tank mounted above the motor made it possible for the car to operate without a fuel pump. The engine was a small, air-cooled Waukesha two-cylinder boxer, much like that of the Citroen 2CV, and had a fan as an integral part of the flywheel. The engine was connected to a three-speed transmission that provided power directly via a torque tube to the rear axle, eliminating the need for joints. This arrangement was judged unreliable, and conventional universal joints were fitted starting in 1941.

Production for 1939 was 2,017 units; however, only 422 cars were built in 1940. For 1941 a range of new, body-style variations of the 48-inch (1.22 m) wide car were introduced to expand the line-up: a station wagon, two panel vans (one called the "Parkway Delivery" had no front cabin roof), and a pick-up truck and "Covered Wagon" model that could convert into a truck by means of a removable back seat and detachable soft-top over the rear section. Crosley built nearly 2,300 cars in 1941. When the company introduced its first metal-topped model, the "Liberty Sedan," for 1942, pricing across the model range was $299 to $450.

During World War II, the Crosley car became attractive due to gasoline rationing and the car's fuel efficiency, an estimated 50 miles per US gallon (4.7 L/100 km; 60 mpg_{‑imp}) at speeds of up to 50 mph (80 km/h). Crosley was the last company to cease production of civilian vehicles in 1942, after building another 1,000 units that year. When the onset of war ended all automobile production in the United States in 1942, Crosley had produced a total of 5,757 cars. During the pre-war years the Crosley company operated manufacturing plants in Camp Washington, Ohio; Richmond, Indiana; and Marion, Indiana. The Crosley factories were converted to wartime production during the war.

=== War-time production ===
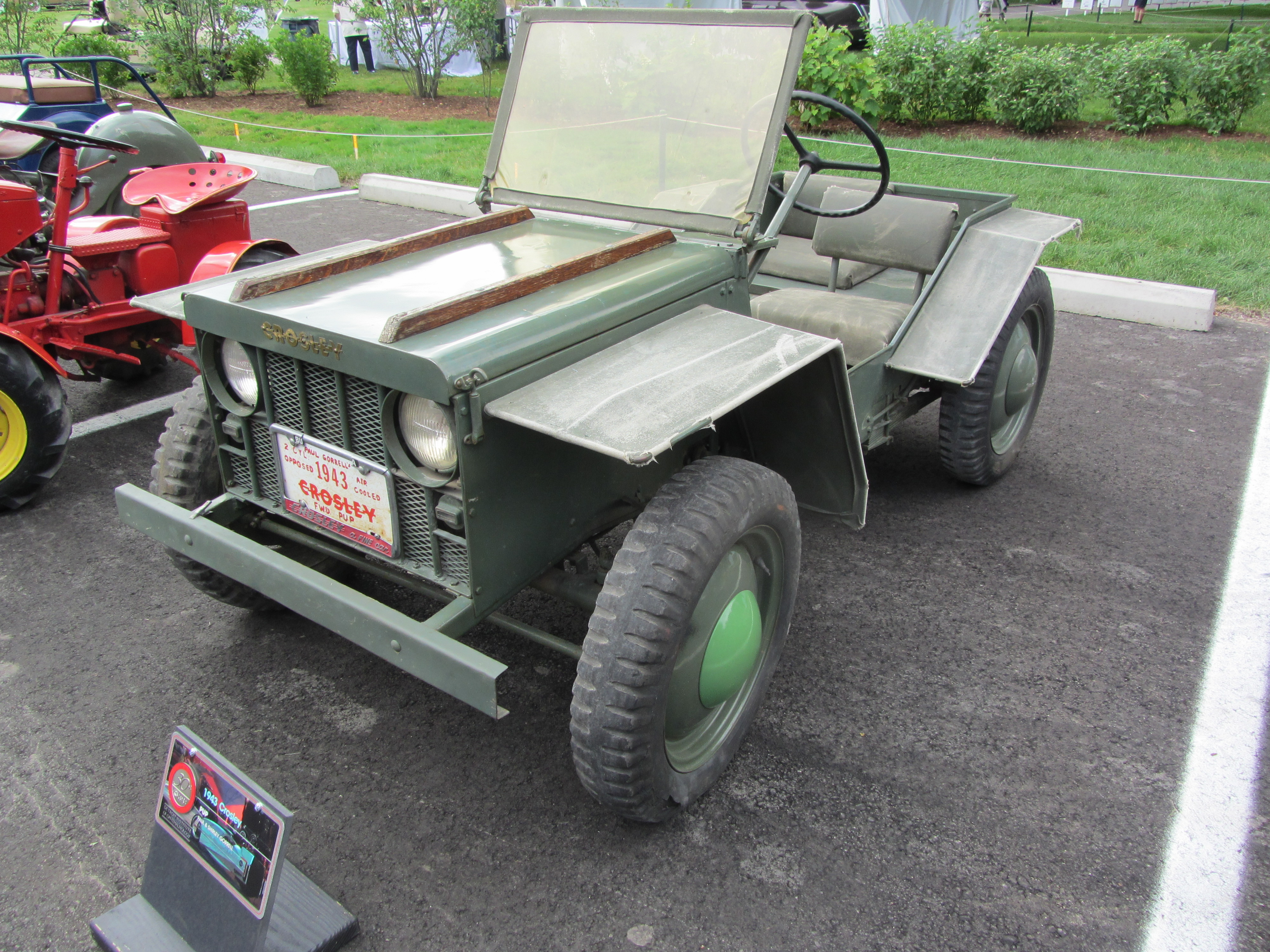
One of thirty-six Crosley CT-3 'Pup' extra-light, 4WD, mini-jeep prototypes.

The Crosley Corporation was involved in war production planning before December 1941, and like the rest of American industry, it focused on manufacturing war-related products during the war years. The company made a variety of products, ranging from proximity fuzes, radio transceivers, field kitchens, and quarter-ton trailers, to gun turrets, among other items. Powered gun turrets for PT boats and B-24 and B-29 bombers were the company's largest contract.

Crosley also produced a number of experimental vehicles during the war for the U.S. government. Crosley's auto manufacturing division, CRAD, in Richmond, Indiana, produced experimental motorcycles, tricycles, four-wheel-drive military light utility vehicles, a self-propelled gun, and continuous track vehicles, some of which were amphibious models. All of these military prototypes were powered by the 2-cylinder boxer engine that powered the original Crosley automobiles. Crosley had nearly 5,000 of the engines on hand when auto production ceased in 1942, and hoped to put them to use in war-time production of miniature vehicles.

One vehicle prototype was the 1942–1943 Crosley CT-3 "Pup," a lightweight, single-passenger, four-wheel-drive vehicle that was transportable and air-droppable from a C-47 Skytrain. Six of the 1,125-pound (510 kg), 2-cylinder Pups were deployed overseas after undergoing tests at Fort Benning, Georgia, but the project was discontinued due to several weak components. Seven of 36 Pups built are known to survive.

Crosley experimental World War II prototypes
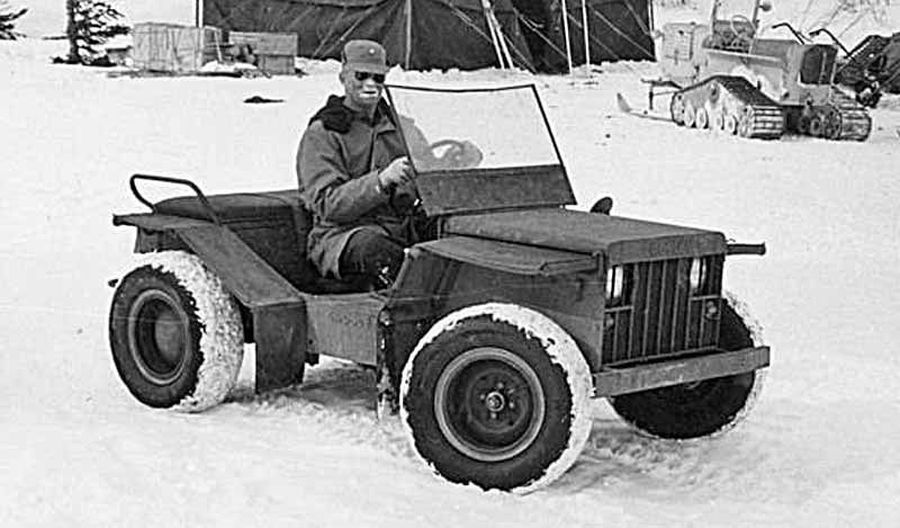
Crosley "Pup" winter testing at U.S. Army Camp Hale, Colorado (1943)

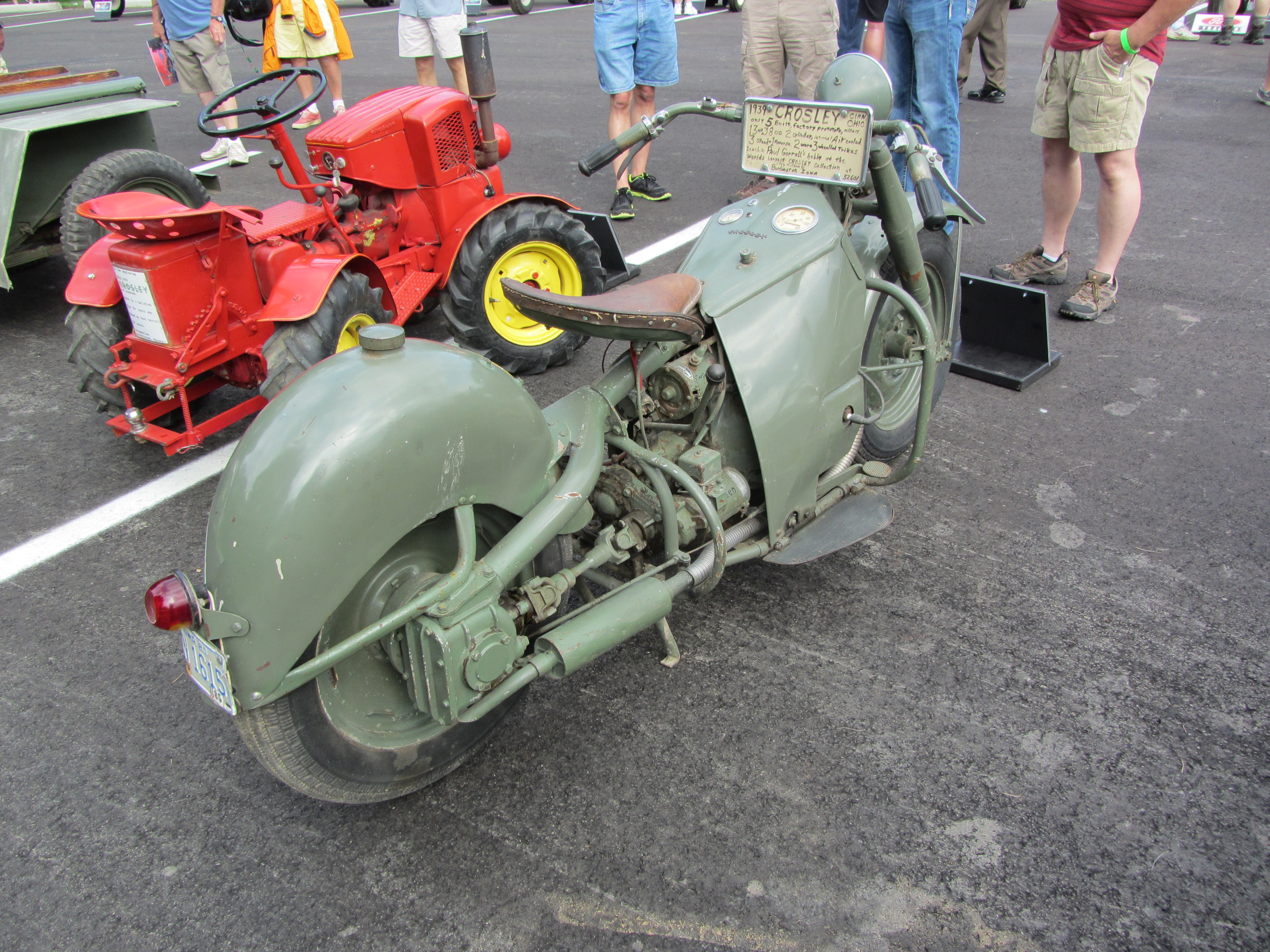
Compact, shaft-drive motorcycle proposal, also featuring reverse gear

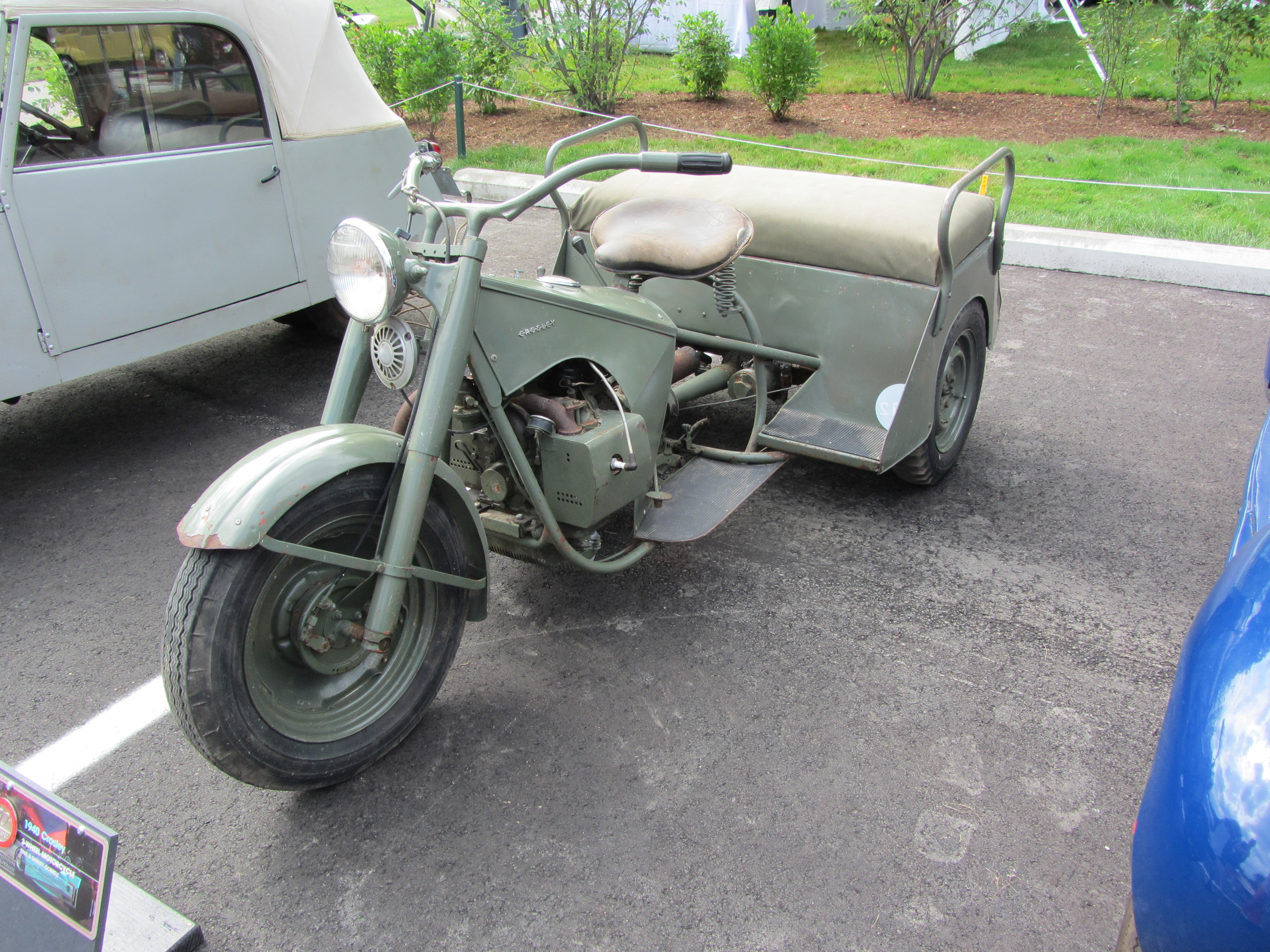
1939 military tricycle prototype with Crosley's automotive drive-train

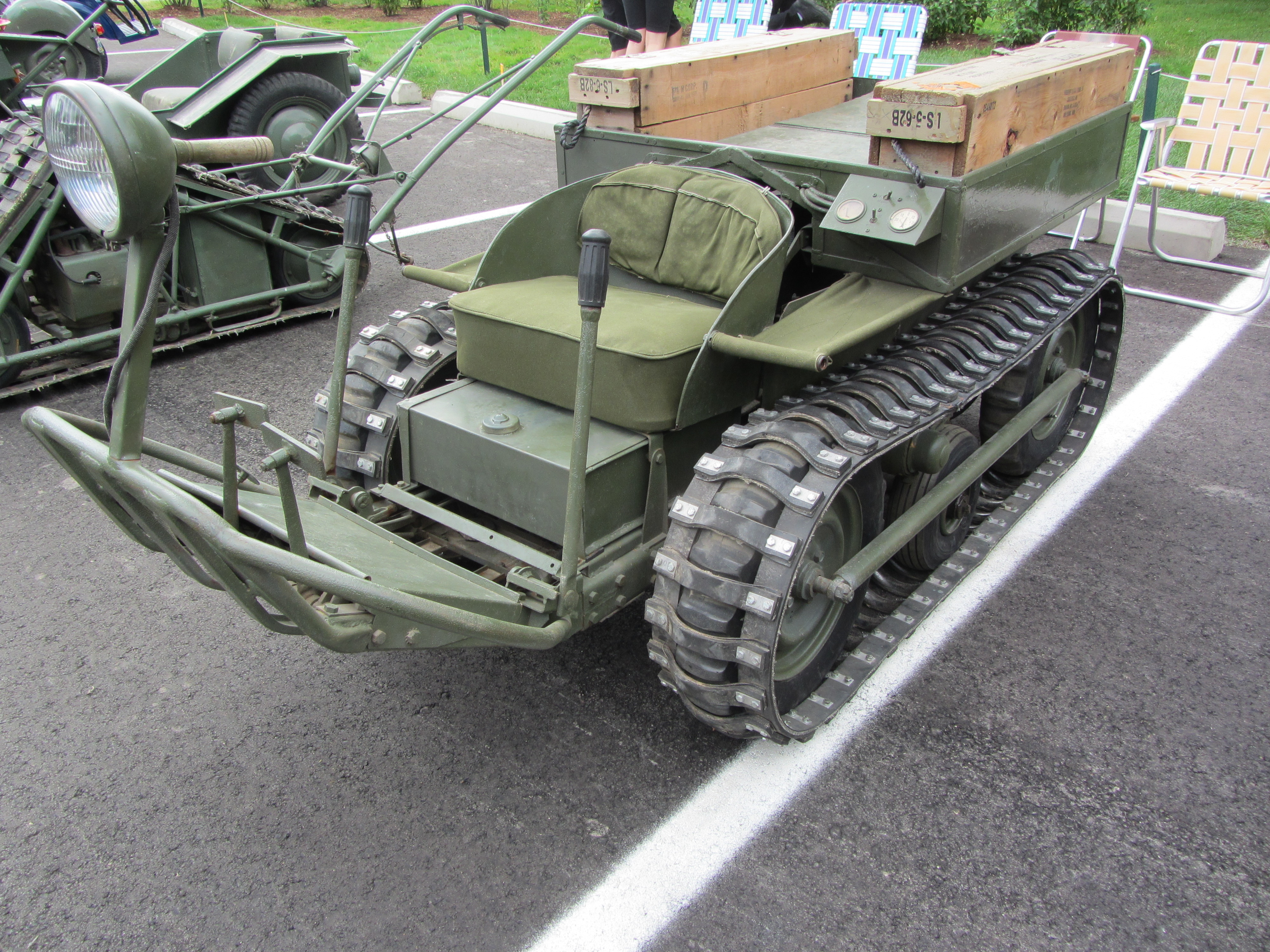
Crosley 'Mule' — one of several light tracked military vehicle prototypes.
Color photos credit to John Lloyd under CC BY 2.0 license

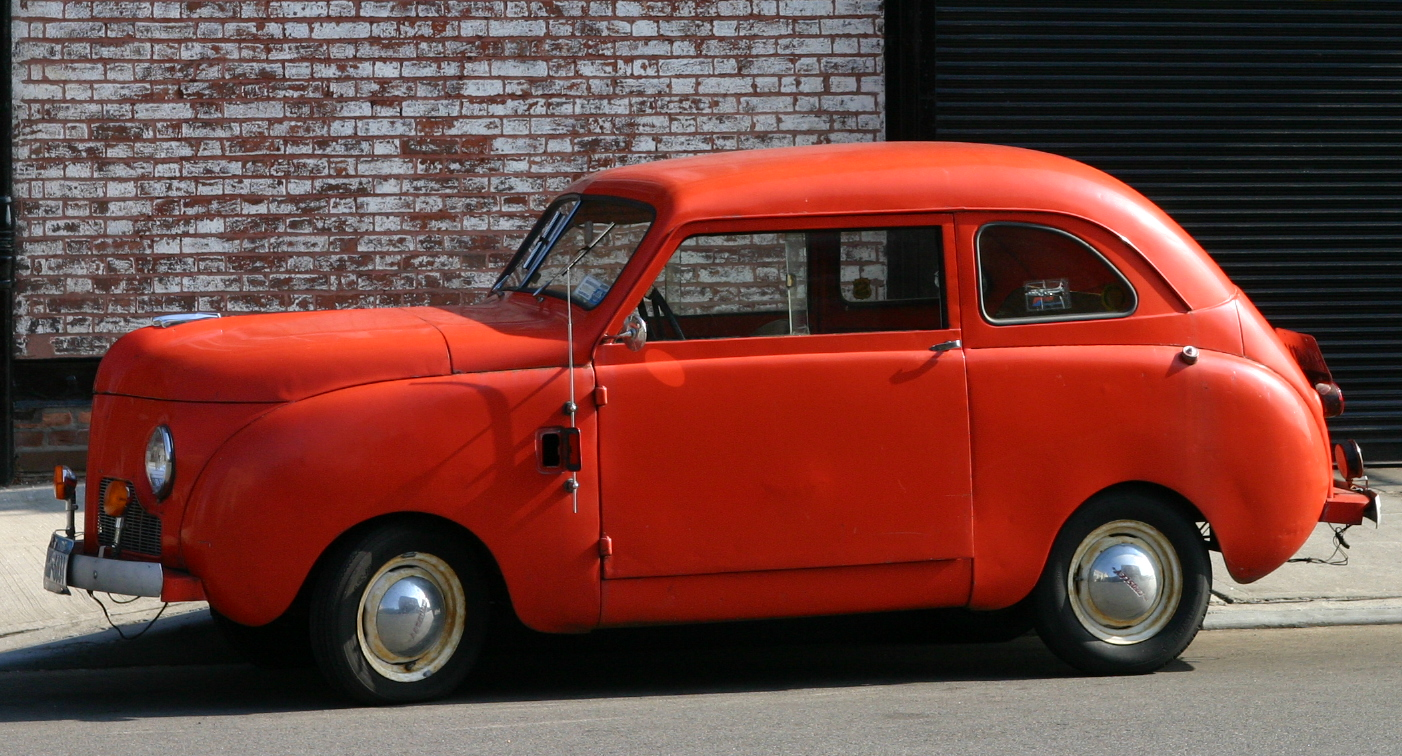
The 1946–1948 model CC was one of the first slab-sided production cars; shown Sedan profile also a precursor to later hatchback cars.

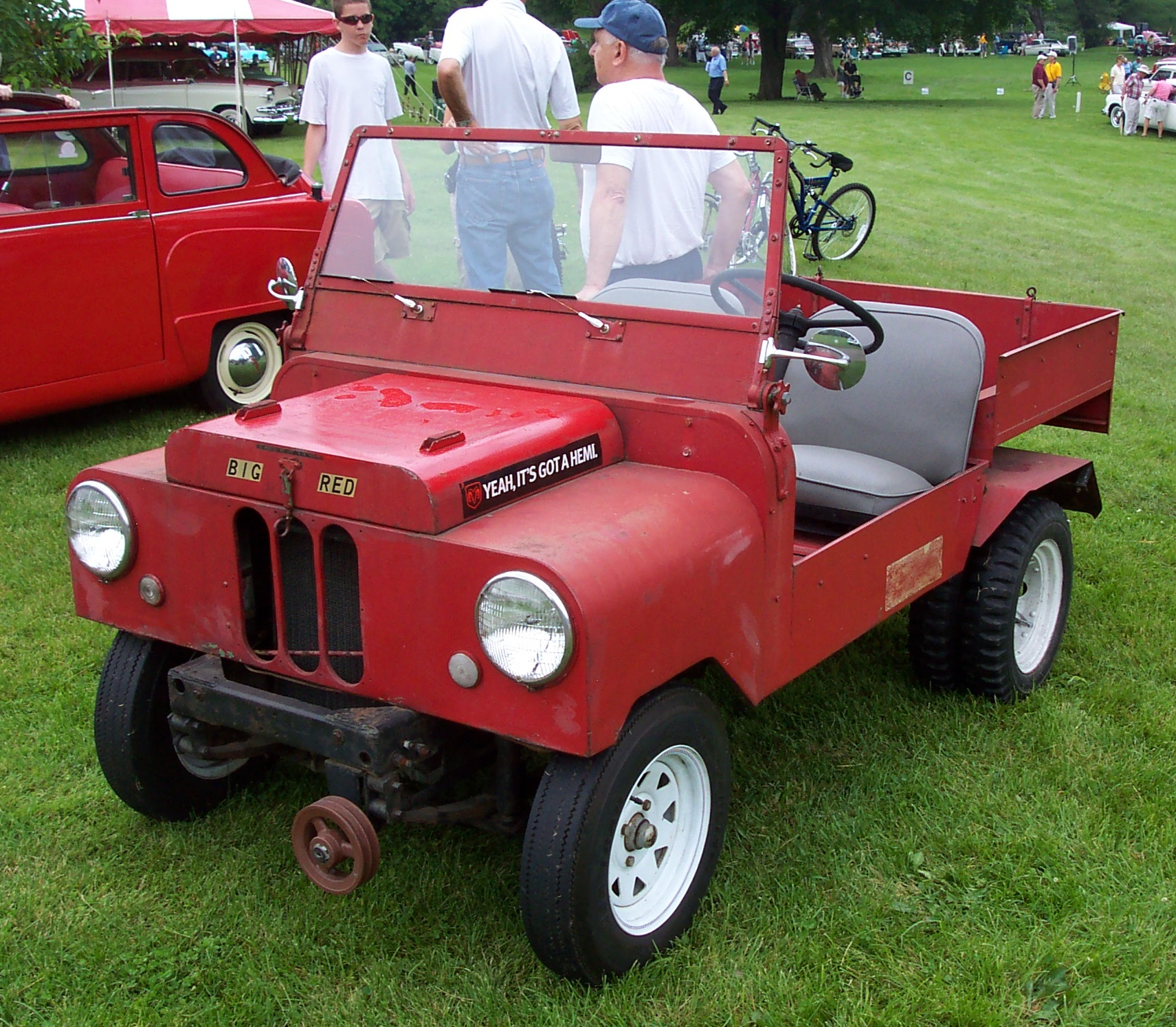
1950 Farm-O-Road with front power take-off – the tiny vehicle could power many farm implements, but was also highway-legal.

=== Post-war continuation; notable innovations ===
In the post-war period, Crosley introduced several "firsts" in the American automobile industry, including:

- first mass-produced slab-sided / ponton-style car, the model 'CC', introduced in 1946, together with the Frazer / Kaiser of the same year.
- first mass-production overhead camshaft engine, the CoBra (for Copper Brazed), carried over from military production, also starting in the 1946 model CC, (Note: Built in five-figure numbers after Duesenberg built some 650 OHC Straight Eights from 1921–1926.)
- first use of the term 'Sport(s-) Utility' in 1947, for the 1948 model year (albeit for an open model based on the wagon, not a wagon on a truck chassis),
- first American cars to be fitted with 4-wheel caliper type disc brakes, for the 1949 model year only — (the Chrysler Imperial introduced four-wheel disc brakes as standard equipment on Crown Imperials for the 1949 model year, but they were not of the caliper type), and
- first American post-war volume production sports car, the Hotshot, also in the 1949 model year. (Note: After the 1947 introduced Playboy convertible, of which just under a hundred were built until 1951.)

In 1950 Crosley brought the Farm-O-Road model, a 63-inch (1.60 m) wheelbase utility vehicle, decades ahead of the John Deere Gator and other small Utility vehicles. From 1950 onwards, Crosley's main models gained roll-down instead of sliding side windows.

=== Crosmobile ===
Crosleys were built under the Crosmobile marque for overseas export. Crosmobiles were simply badge-engineered Crosleys, and were identical to standard Crosley models except for having Crosmobile-lettered hood and rear badges and hubcaps and instrument-cluster demarcations. The purpose of differentiating the exported Crosleys was to avoid confusion or conflict with Great Britain's non-related Crossley marque. Crosmobiles not only made it to Europe, but also elsewhere, including Cuba.

1951 Super Station Wagon

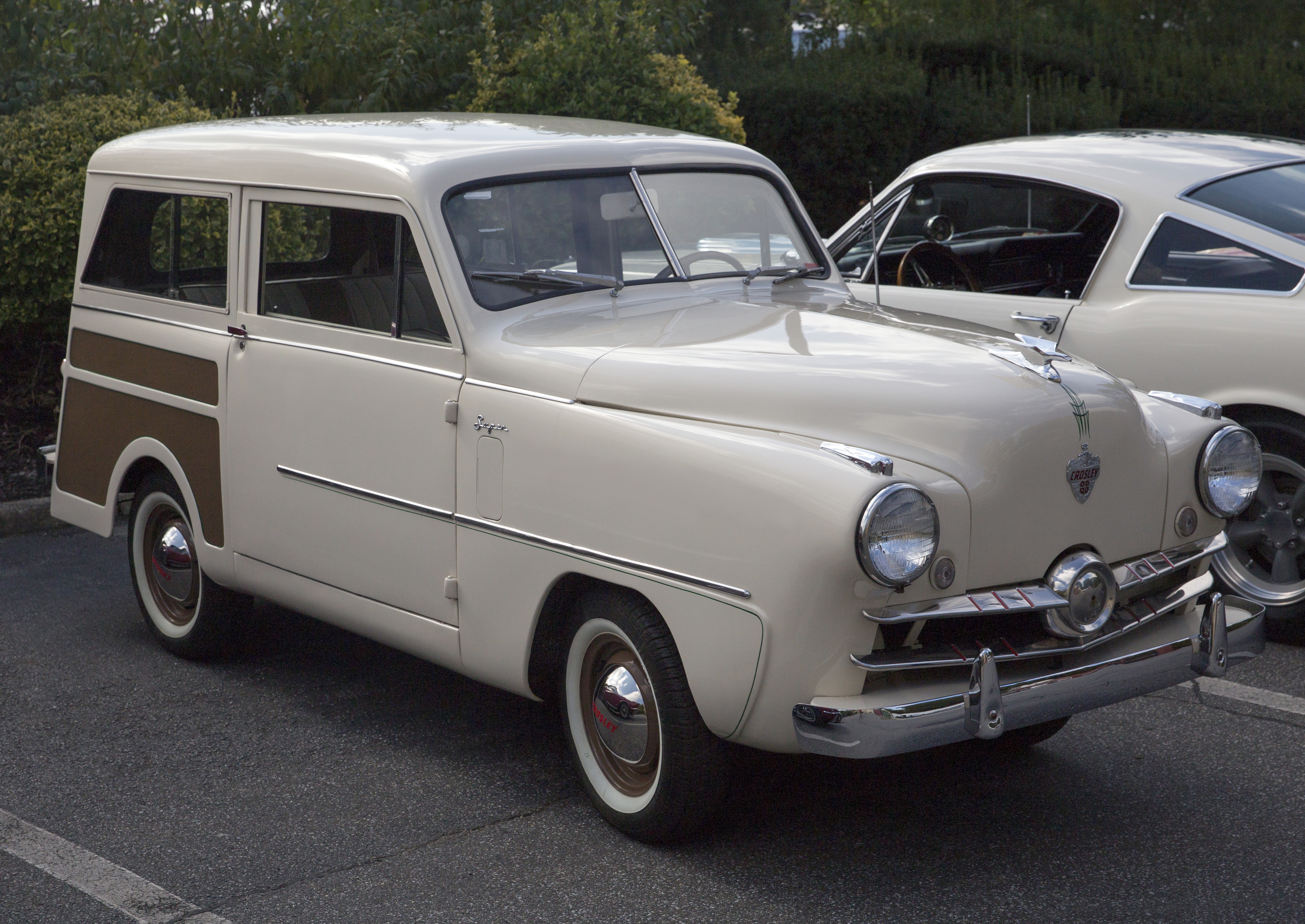
The 1951 and 1952 Crosleys had a restyled front.

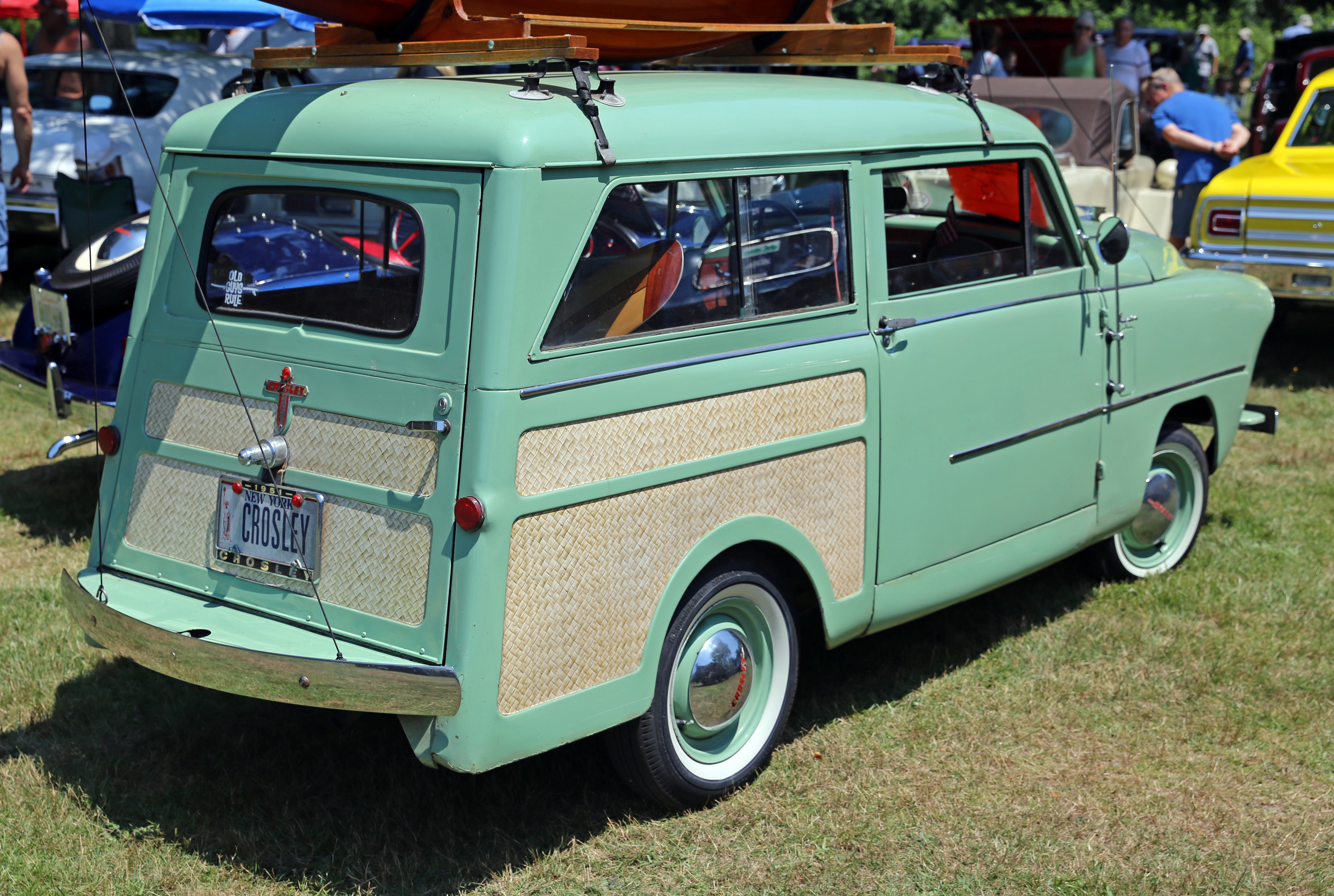
1951 Wagon rear

=== Post-war production and demise ===
Post-war production began with 4,999 vehicles in 1946, and increased to five-figure numbers, producing more than 22,500 cars in 1947. Crosley sales peaked in 1948, with 24,871 or 27,707 cars sold, depending on the source; however, the CoBra copper and stamped steel "tin block" engine proved a major misstep. Although it had proven reliable in military use, it fared poorly under less diligent civilian maintenance. The CoBra was replaced with a redesigned and more reliable conventional cast-iron engine in 1949, but the company's reputation suffered. Sales fell to 8,939 units in 1949, and to 7,612 in 1950. The addition of the Crosley "Hotshot" sports model and the "Farm-O-Road" model, a combination farm-tractor and all-wheel-drive vehicle in 1950, could not stop the decline.

More trouble came after the Big Three automakers introduced bigger, more lavish cars, and began manufacturing them in higher volumes and priced, in some cases, only a little higher than a new Crosley car. Crosley sales dwindled to 4,839 units in 1951; only 1,522 Crosley vehicles were sold in 1952. Production ended on July 3, 1952. Crosley sold about 84,000 cars in total before closing down the operation in 1952. Crosley continued building engines for a short while to fulfill a government contract, but eventually the rights to the engine were sold. The Crosley plant in Marion, Indiana, was sold to the General Tire and Rubber Company.

== Models ==
=== Model summary ===
All Crosleys were two side-door models, with a few exceptions that just had two side door-openings or entry carve-outs

Pre-war production with Waukesha Model 150 air-cooled opposed twin engine:

- 1939: Series (C)1A – Convertible Coupe and Convertible Sedan
- 1940: Series (C)2A – Convertible Coupe, Convertible Sedan / Deluxe Sedan, Station Wagon and Parkway Delivery (Note: (Open cab panel van version))
- 1941: Series CB41 – Convertible Coupe, Sedan and Deluxe Sedan; Station Wagon, Panel Delivery, Parkway Delivery, Covered Wagon and Pickup
- 1942: Series CB42 – Convertible Coupe and (Deluxe) Sedan, Station Wagon, Panel and Parkway Delivery, Covered Wagon, Pickup and steel-top 'Liberty Sedan'

Post-war production with 1946–1949 CoBra water-cooled straight-four engine

- 1946: CC Four — fastback Sedan and Convertible coupe
- 1947: CC Four — fastback Sedan, Convertible coupe and Pickup (roundside)
- 1948: CC Four — fastback Sedan, Convertible coupe, Station wagon, Panel van, Pickup (square), and 'Sport Utility' convertible wagon

Post-war production with 1949–1952 CIBA water-cooled four-cylinder inline engine

- 1949: CD Four including Deluxe Sedan, Coupe, Station Wagon, Pickup Truck and Panel Truck; VC Four including Hotshot Roadster and Super Sports Roadster
- 1950: CD Four including Sedan, Super Sedan, Coupe, Super Coupe, Station Wagon, Super Station Wagon; VC Four including Hotshot Roadster and Super Sports Roadster; FR Four including Farm-O-Road (in various submodels)
- 1951: CD Four including Business Coupe, Super Sedan, Station Wagon, Super Station Wagon, Super Coupe; VC Four including Hotshot Roadster and Super Sports Roadster; and FR Four including Farm-O-Road.
- 1952: CD Four including Standard Business Coupe, Super Sedan, Station Wagon, Super Station Wagon, Super Coupe; VC Four including Hotshot Roadster and Super Sports Roadster; FR Four including Farm-O-Road.

=== Crosley CC Four (1946–1948) ===
CC Four
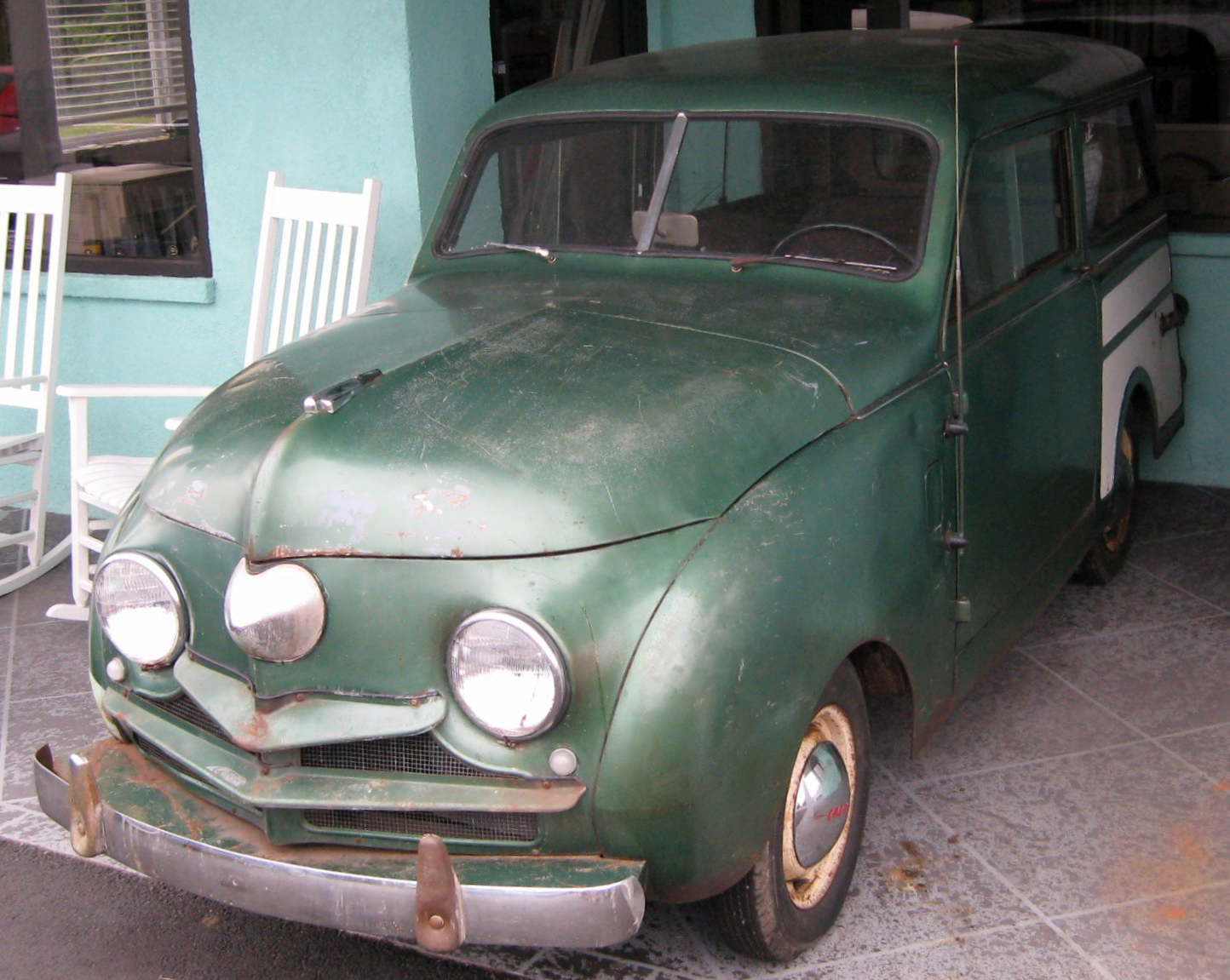
- 1948-1/2 CC Station Wagon

Overview
- Manufacturer: Crosley
- Also called: Crosmobile
- Production: 1946–1948
- Model years: 1947–1948½
- Assembly: Marion, Indiana
- Designer: Sundberg & Ferar

Body and chassis
- Class: Economy car
- Body style: fastback, convertible, wagon, panel van, convertible wagon, pickup
- Layout: Front-engine, rear-wheel drive

Powertrain
- Engine: 44.2 cu in (724 cc) 26.5 hp (20 kW) straight-4
- Transmission: 3-speed manual

Dimensions
- Wheelbase: 80 in (2,000 mm)
- Length: 145 in (3,700 mm)
- Width: 49 in (1,200 mm)
- Height: 59 in (1,500 mm)
- Curb weight: 1,155 lb (524 kg)

Crosley resumed civilian car production in 1946 with the largely new model CC, designed by the firm of Sundberg & Ferar of Royal Oak, Michigan. The slightly larger and more aerodynamic model CC featured an all new body and engine. The chassis, suspension, brakes, and the rest of the drive-train were carried over from the pre-war models. Together with the Frazer / Kaiser of the same year, the 1946 Crosley CC was the first American mass-produced slab-sided / ponton-style bodied car. The post-war Crosleys also had a new, water-cooled, straight-four CoBra engine, carried over from military production. Although not much larger in displacement than its predecessor, power output was doubled to 26.5 hp (20 kW), improving the car's performance, with a claimed cruising speed of 50 mph (80 km/h), while fuel economy remained excellent at 35–50 mpg_{‑US} (6.7–4.7 L/100 km; 42–60 mpg_{‑imp}). Additionally, the CoBra (for Copper Brazed) was America's first affordable mass-production overhead camshaft car engine, built in five-figure numbers after Duesenberg built some 650 OHC Straight Eights from 1921 to 1926.

Introduced as a steel roof, two-door, two-box fastback sedan and a fixed profile convertible (with fixed side windows and frames, like the Citroën 2CV and the 2007 Fiat 500), the car also became available as a pick-up – initially with a pickup-box with the same rounded rear-side panels as the sedan (roundside pickup). In late 1947 a station wagon was added, as a 1948 model, as well as a panel van – a derivative of the wagon, but with a different floorpan to yield a flatter floor. The panel delivery also had a side opening rear door, as opposed to the Station wagon's above/below split tailgate, while the basic sedan had no outside trunk lid – access to the luggage space was only from inside the car.

From the arrival of the station wagon, the pickups were built with the wagon's straight rear panels, giving a wider, more square rear box. In 1948 Crosley added bolt-on grille-bars and a chromed bull-nose to the front for the '48½ model year, and introduced a new convertible wagon variant without doors, dubbed the "Sports Utility." The vehicle was advertised with a quarter-ton payload capacity for utility use, and its rear seat was optional. The entire range of CC models were based on the same two-door car and frame. The 1948 Station Wagon became the most popular model Crosley built, with 23,489 units made.

A 1947 test of the Crosley sedan and convertible determined that "There is leg room for a man as tall as six feet two or three but due to the over-curve of the top and the window design, he may have to duck to see left or right", and unless he is narrow-shouldered "he will have to ride these things side saddle or not at all". Further, the tester felt that the engine lacked bottom-end power, and that the true cruising speed was between 35 and 40 mph (56 and 64 km/h) — the car will do 50 mph (80 km/h), and he drove one faster than that, but at these speeds "the little 4-cylinder engine screams like a banshee with the hot-foot" and driving felt quite uncomfortable. Also, the inside door handles were placed too far back, and the two-piece, sliding door windows made it impossible to comfortably drive with one arm out of the window. On the other hand, the tester deemed that "the chassis rides exceptionally well", ".. undoubtedly the best of the miniature type ever made in this country".

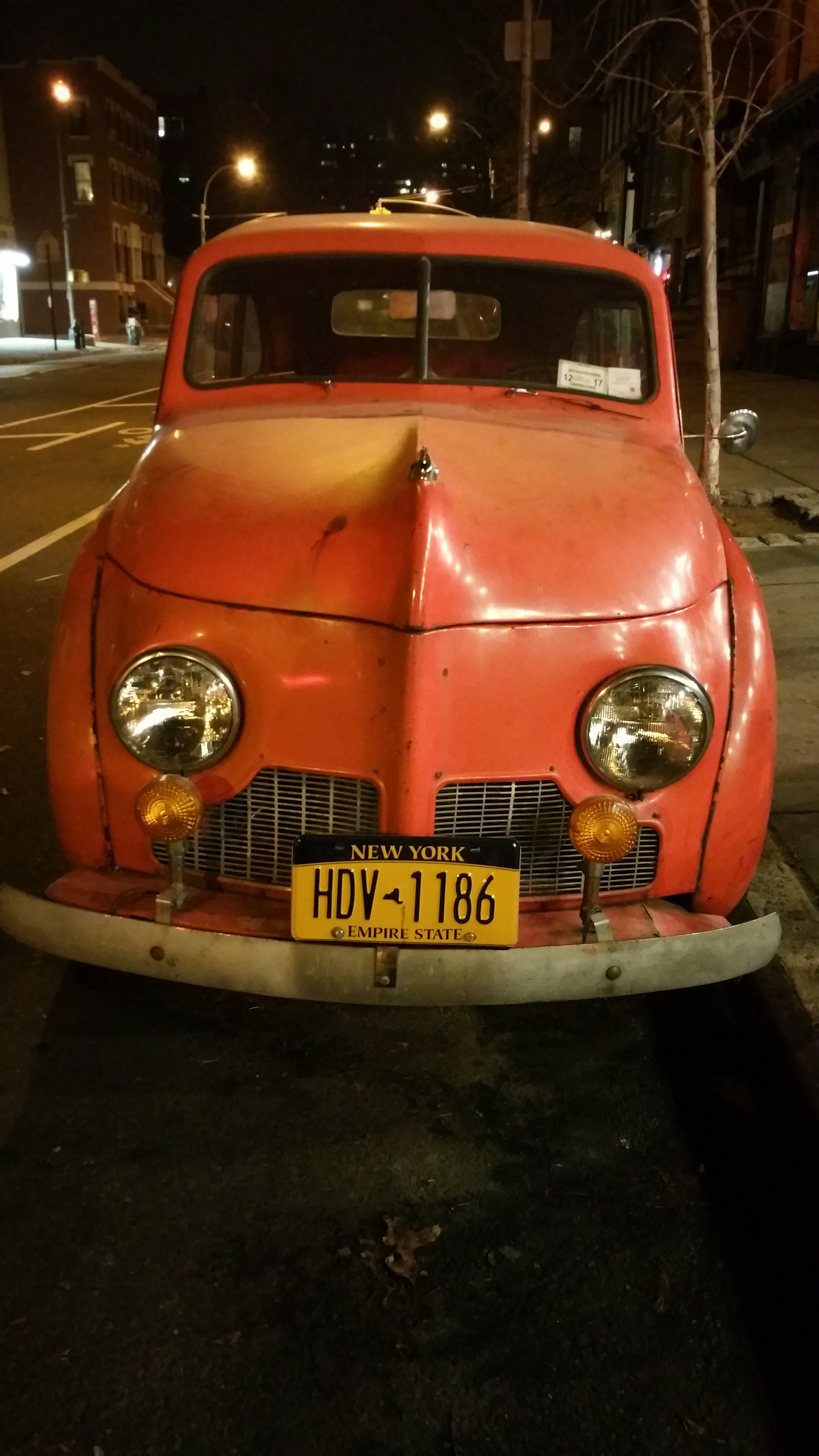
Front of a 1946/1947 model; blinkers were optional.

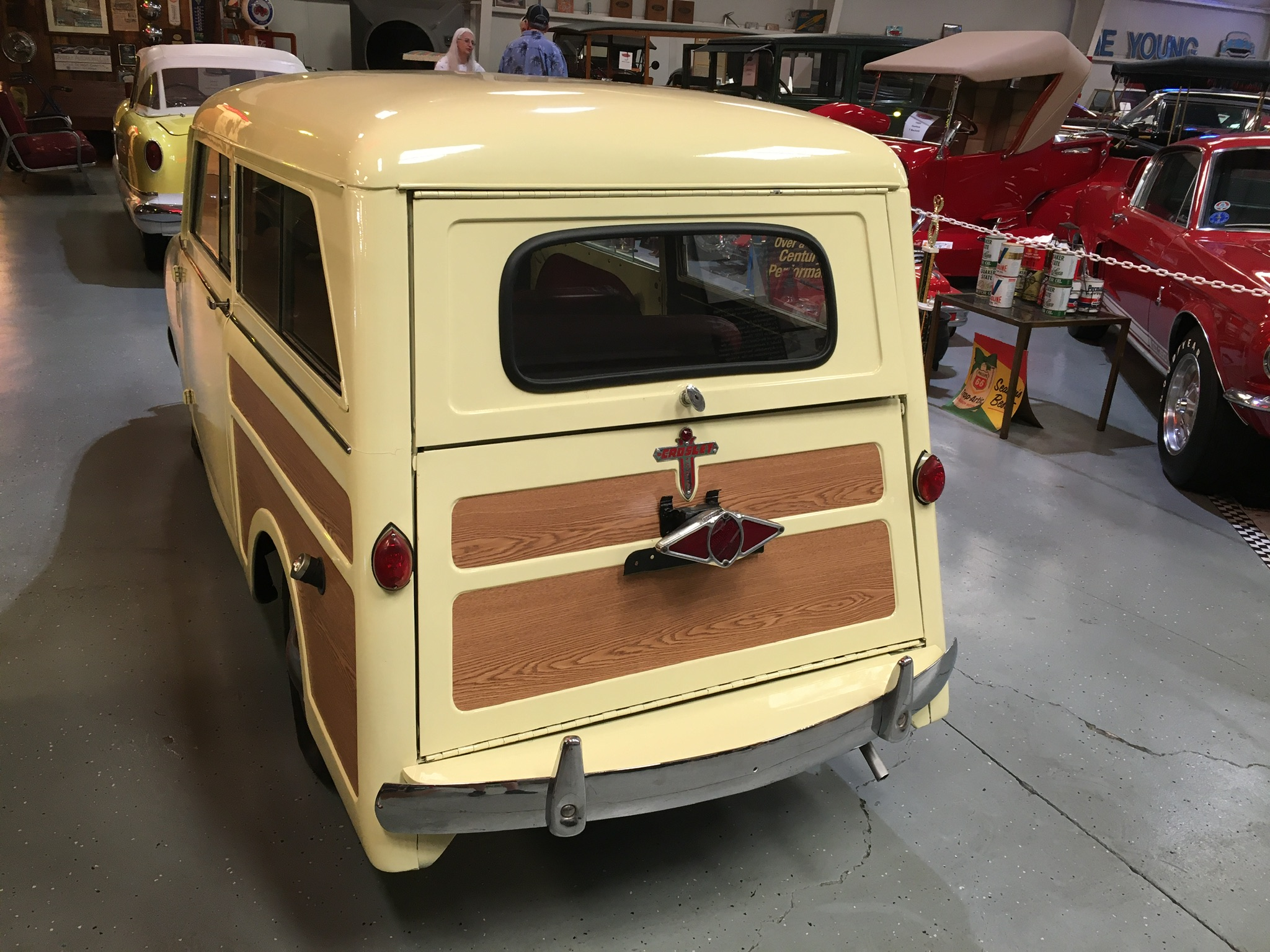
Rear of the Crosley Station Wagon featured split upper and lower tailgates.

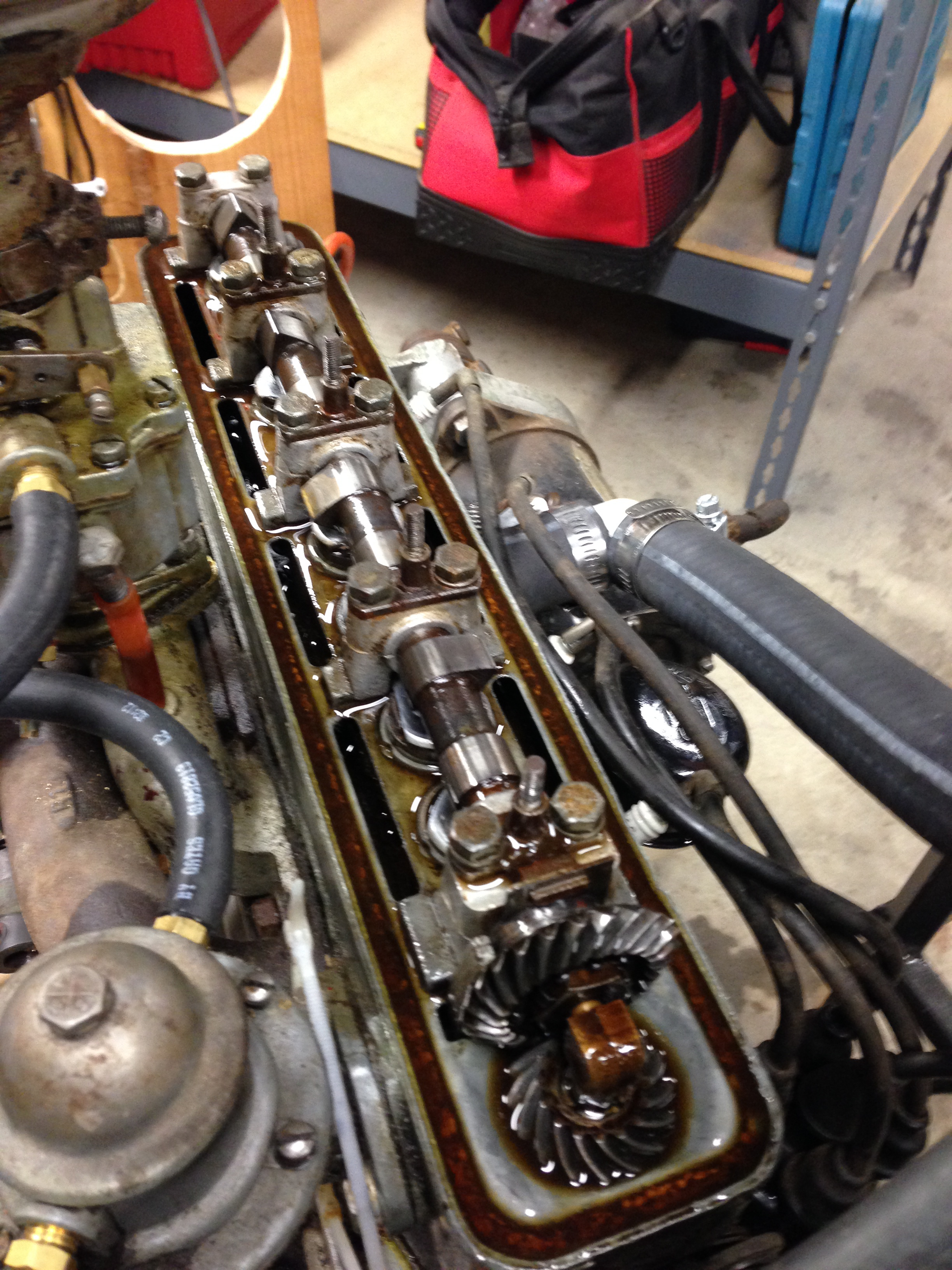
The CC's CoBra engine's camshaft was driven by a tower bevel shaft.

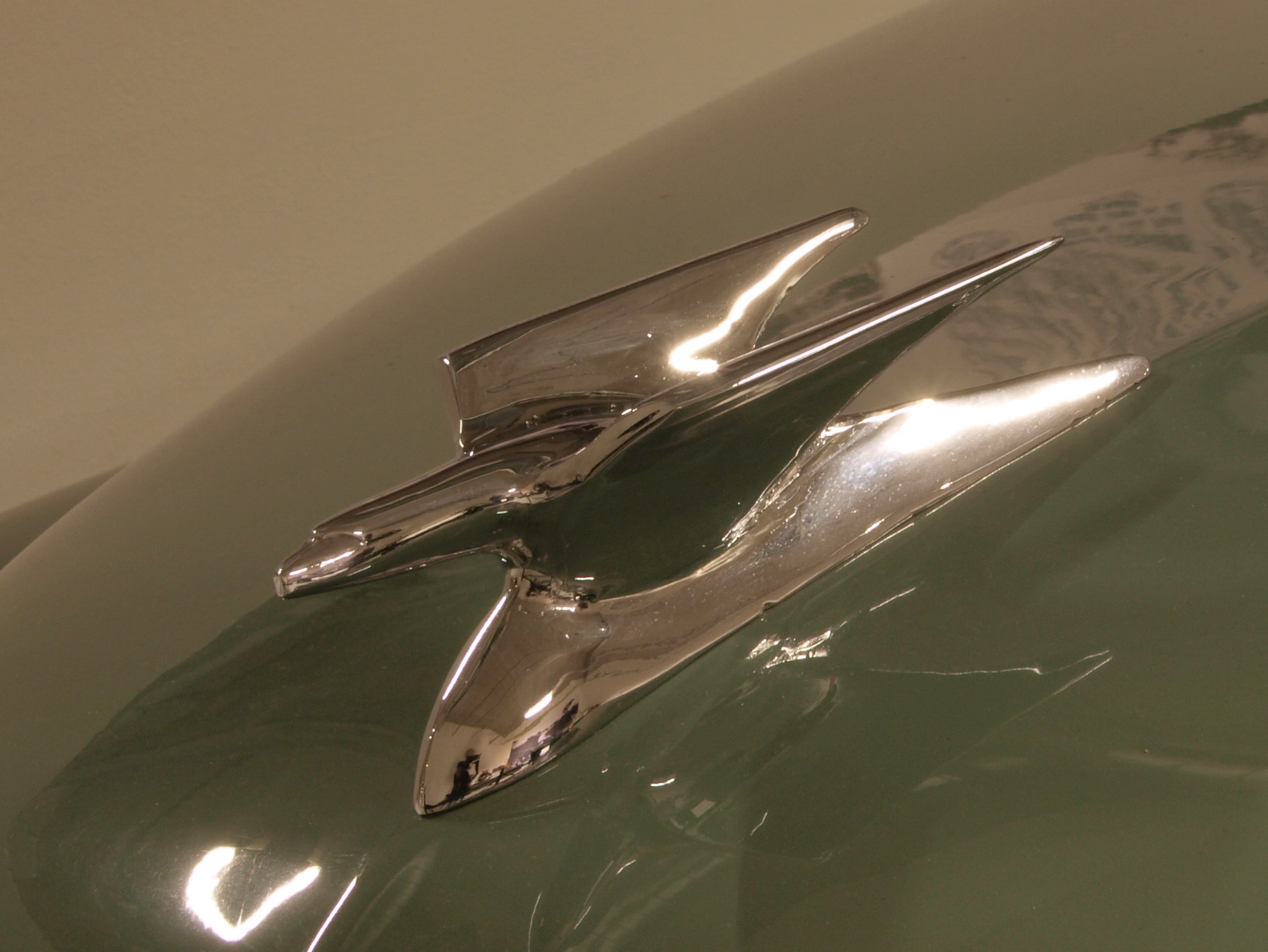
The chrome hood ornament was introduced early in the '48 model year.

=== Crosley CD Four (1949–1952) ===
Crosley CD Sedan
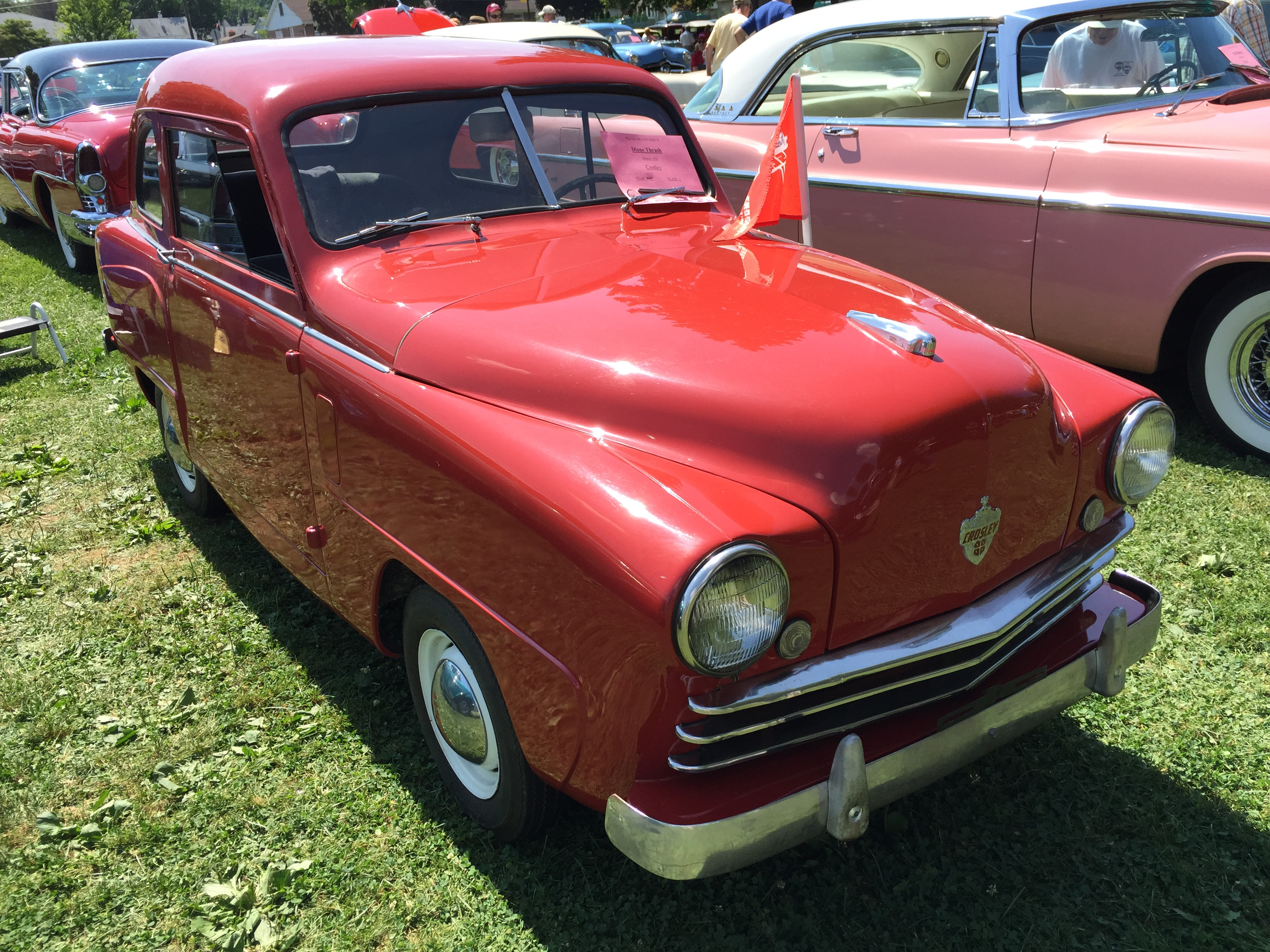
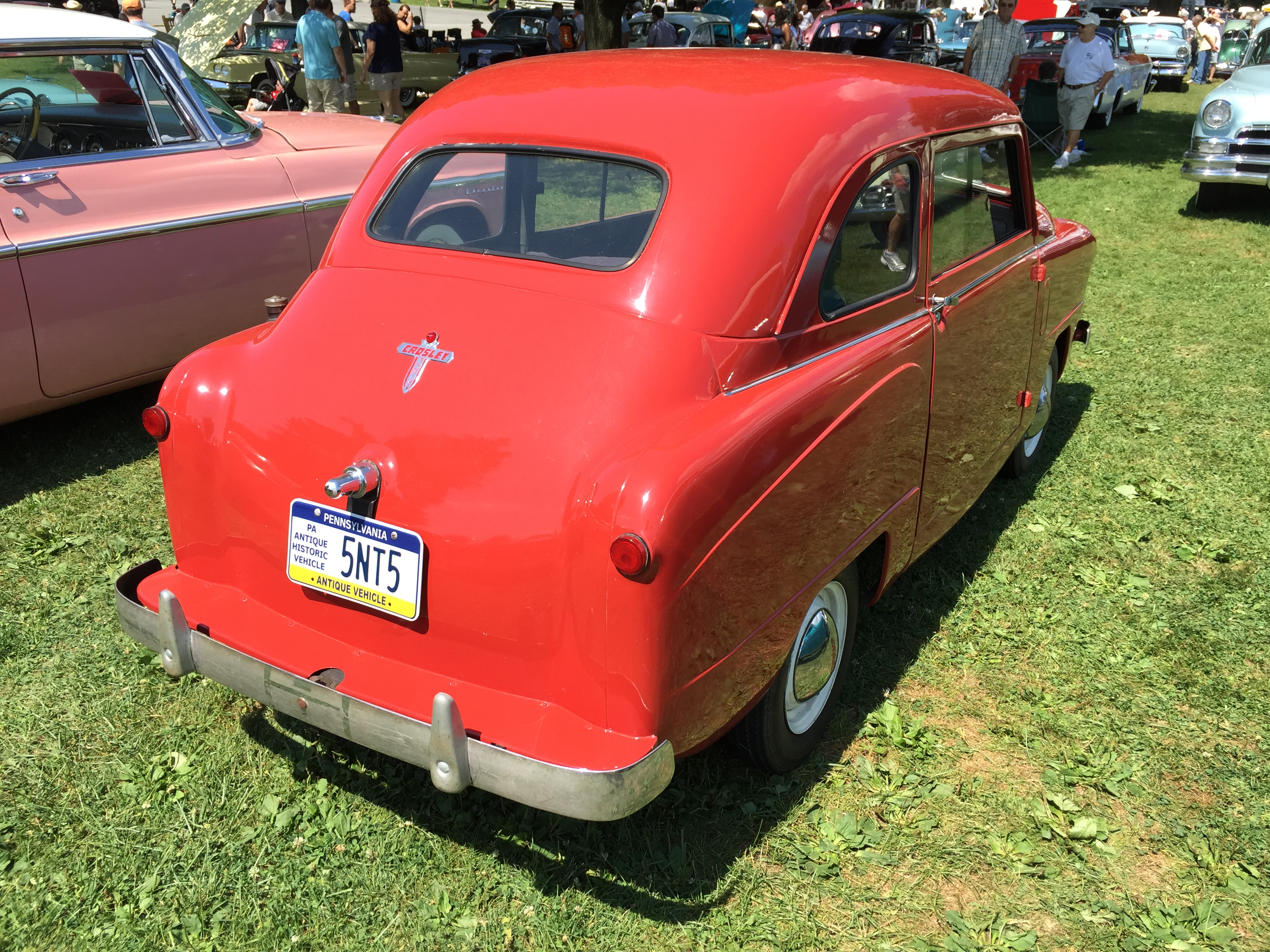
1949/1950 CD Sedan, front and rear

In 1948 Crosley replaced the CC with the 1949 model year CD. Front and rear bodywork were redesigned on the sedan / coupe and convertible, though rear bodywork on the station wagon and pickup remained largely unaltered. A significant change was fitting the cast-iron block CIBA engine instead of the stamped-steel CoBra engines, that were lighter, but required more maintenance, or else would yield reliability problems.

For 1949 and 50 there were standard and Deluxe models. The '49 model year still had sliding glass side windows in the doors, but from the 1950 model year, roll-down windows and electric wipers were offered. For 1951 and 1952 the front was again redone; the Deluxe model replaced the standard model as the bottom of the range, and 'Super' models were introduced as the new top of the line.

The CD models started with the same 6 in (150 mm) mechanical brakes as previous Crosleys on the 1949 model, but switched to 4-wheel Goodyear–Hawley aircraft-type disc brakes in May 1949. However, they were short-lived, and only continued through mid 1950. The alloy disc material was found to rust, and had freeze-up problems in parts of the country where salt was used on the roads. So 9 in (230 mm) hydraulic brakes were phased back in, and these remained til the end of production.

=== Crosley Hotshot ===
HotShot
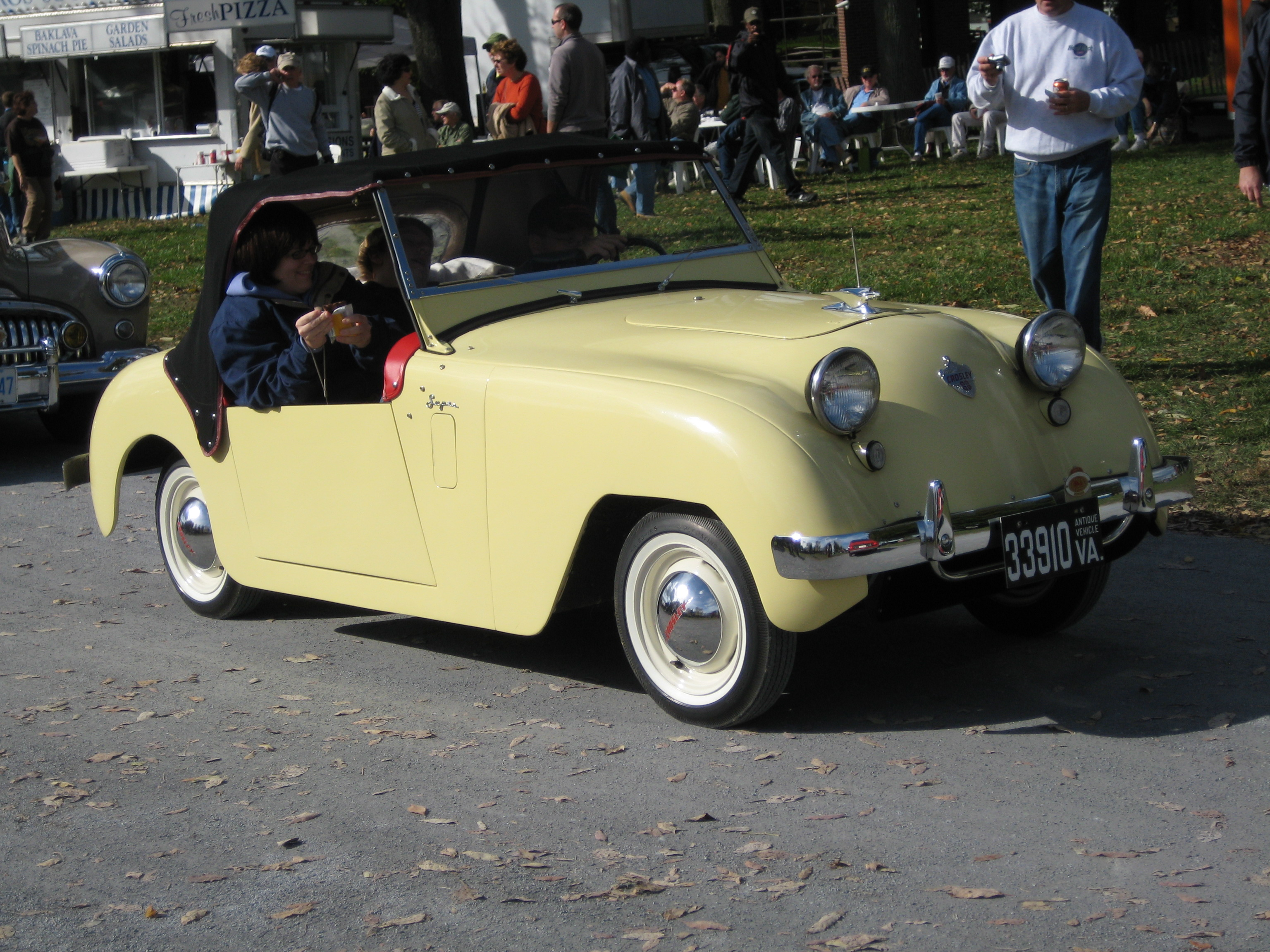
- 1951 Crosley Super Sport

Overview
- Also called: Super Hotshot, Super Sport
- Production: 1949–1952
- Assembly: Marion, Indiana

Body and chassis
- Body style: roadster, convertible sports car
- Layout: front mid-engined, rear-wheel-drive

Powertrain
- Engine: 44 cu in (724 cc) 26.5 hp (20 kW) straight-4
- Transmission: 3-speed manual

Dimensions
- Wheelbase: 85 in (2,200 mm)
- Length: 137 in (3,500 mm)
- Width: 51 in (1,300 mm)
- Curb weight: 1,095 lb (497 kg)

After building only bottom-end of the market economy cars since its inception, Crosley introduced a little sports car in 1949, the doorless Hotshot roadster. It also featured a largely new, dropped frame – both more low slung, and for the first time with a wheelbase that diverged from all the previous Crosley models' 80 in (2,000 mm) wheelbase by 5 in (130 mm) extra. The rear suspension used a combination of coil springs, assisted by single leaf quarter-elliptical leaf-springs that doubled as torque-rods, and the car had disc brakes on all four wheels. The engine was placed behind the front axle, for a front mid-engined layout. The 137 in (3,500 mm) long Hotshot, introduced for $849, weighed just 1,095 lb (497 kg). But to go racing, the weight was further reducible to 991 lb (450 kg), by temporarily discarding such things as the detachable windscreen, and the non-folding (stowed) soft-top and side-curtains. There was no trunk lid — the spare wheel was mounted on the down-sloping rear deck, above the rear bumper, and access to the rear stowage room was by folding the seat-backs forward. Powered by a 26.5 hp (20 kW) CIBA engine, the Hotshot was capable of more than 80 mph (130 km/h).

A Super version of the HotShot was added in 1950, featuring solid hinged doors and a fold-down top that didn't have to be stowed, and "full red plastic leather upholstery and lining". For 1951 and 1952 the Super Hotshot was simply renamed the Super Sports.

Regardless of its short life and small size, the Hotshot is remembered as an impressive sports car within its class. A Hotshot won the Sam Collier Memorial Endurance Grand Prix, (averaging 52 mph (84 km/h)), as well as the "index of performance" — an award which took speed and engine size into account — at the 1950 Six Hours of Sebring; and a Siata 300 fitted with Crosley power won the SCCA's 12 hour Vero Beach race.

Throughout the 1950s, Crosley engines dominated 750 cc sports car racing, winning 10 out of 12 SCCA west-coast races alone.

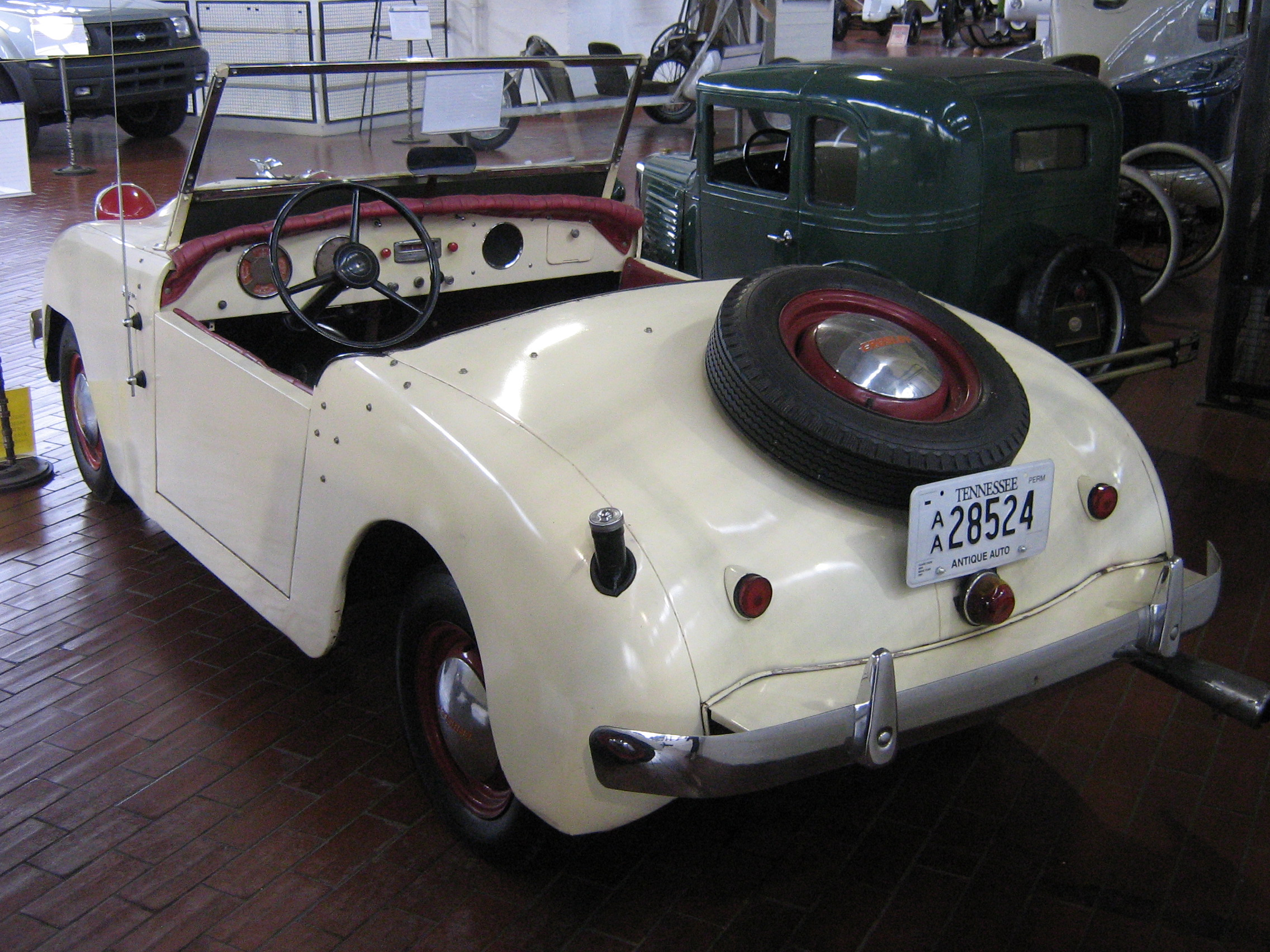
1951 Crosley Super Sport rear

=== Crosley Farm-O-Road ===
Crosley Farm-O-Road
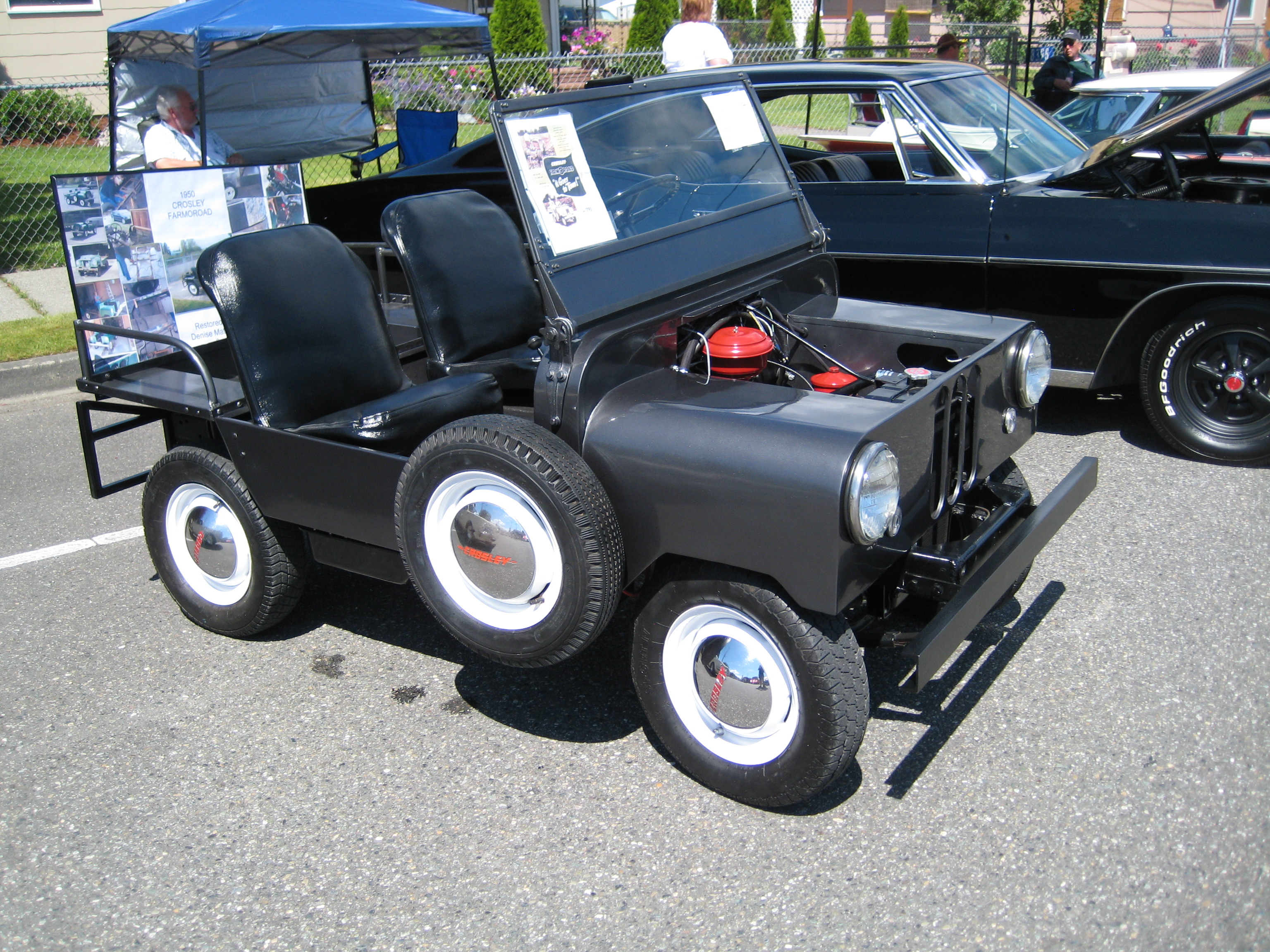
- the base Farm-O-Road came without rear bed, and was less than 2 1/2 m (8 ft) long

Overview
- Manufacturer: Crosley
- Production: 1950 – 1952
- Assembly: Marion, Indiana

Body and chassis
- Class: Light utility vehicle
- Body style: jeep-like
- Layout: Front-engine, rear-wheel drive

Powertrain
- Engine: 44.2 cu in (724 cc) 26.5 hp (20 kW) straight-4 CIBA
- Transmission: 3-speed manual with a two-ratio, PTO-capable range box

Dimensions
- Wheelbase: 63 in (1,600 mm)
- Length: 91.5 in (2,320 mm) (without the optional, detachable bed)
- Width: 48 in (1,200 mm) (excluding the side-mounted spare wheel)
- Height: 56.5 in (1,440 mm) (with the windshield and top up)
- Curb weight: 1,100 lb (500 kg)

Chronology
- Successor: Crofton Bug

Crosley had produced different products for the war effort, including the 'Pup' 4x4 prototype, a tiny air-portable 4WD. In 1950, to broaden its line-up into the commercial and agricultural market, the Farm-O-Road was introduced – an ATV sized utility vehicle that looked like a small Jeep. It was a combination of a light tractor, a small pickup and a passenger vehicle, and was intended for rural customers who wanted a vehicle for doing chores around the farm, but which could also take them into town. According to Crosley, the Farm-O-Road was designed: "To do big jobs on small farms, and smaller jobs on big farms." Although it could be viewed as a precursor to today's Side by Side UTV's, the Farm-O-Road was fully street-legal, with a top speed estimated at 40 mph (64 km/h) on the highway.

The Farm-O-Road took its cues from the Jeep and the wartime Pup. It had a boxy, minimalist body, riding on a 63 in (1,600 mm) wheelbase, and it weighed 1,100 lb (500 kg). The Farm-O-Road was powered by the same 26.5 hp (20 kW) 44.2 cu in (724 cc) CIBA engine as the other Crosley models at the time, mated to a three-speed Warner T-92 transmission with a two-ratio, PTO-capable range box mounted behind it. In addition to normal gearing, it offered a 4-to-1 low reduction. The base price was $795, or $939 with a hydraulic system including a hydraulically operated drawbar.

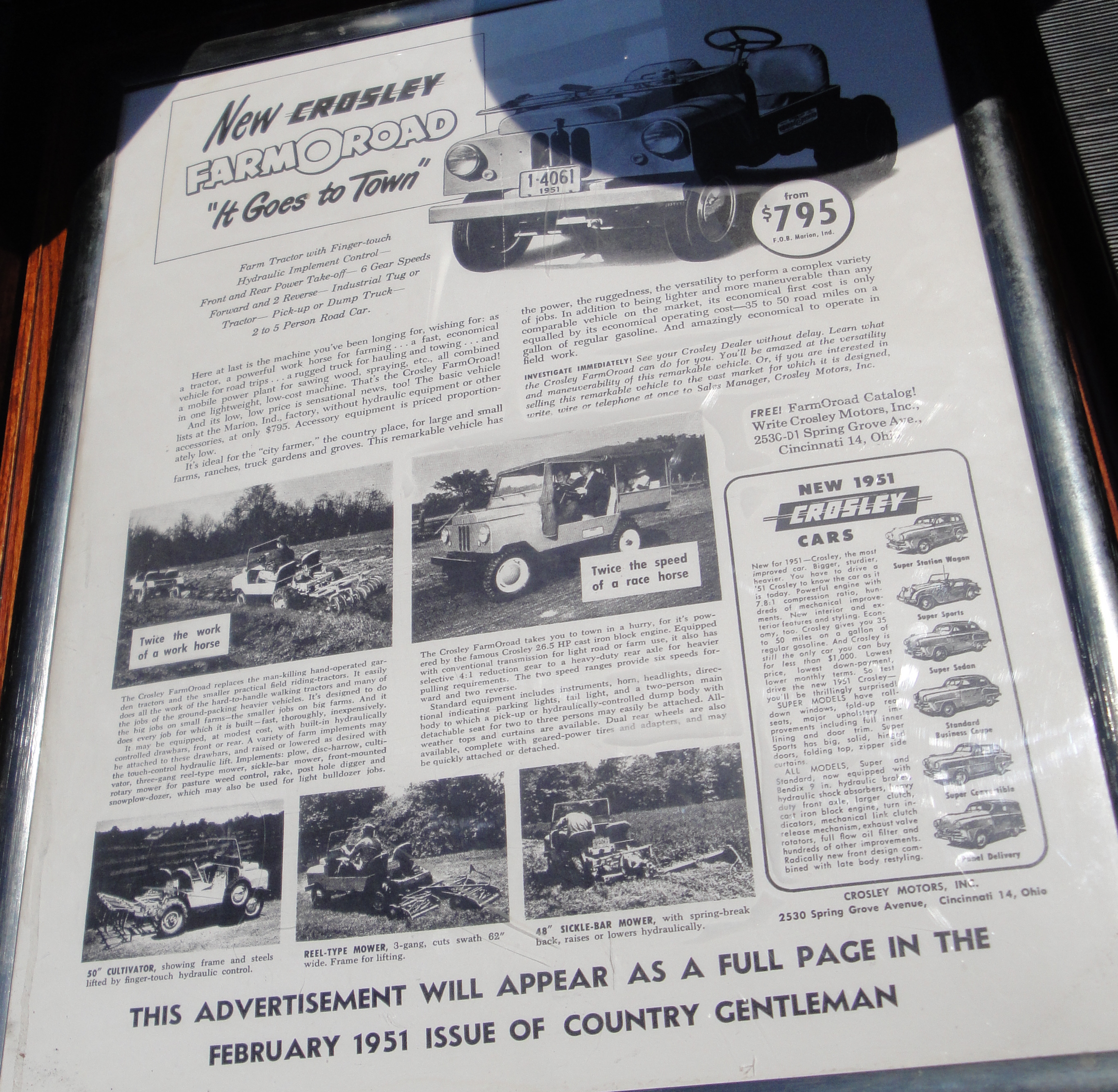
Advertisement showing many available farm implements

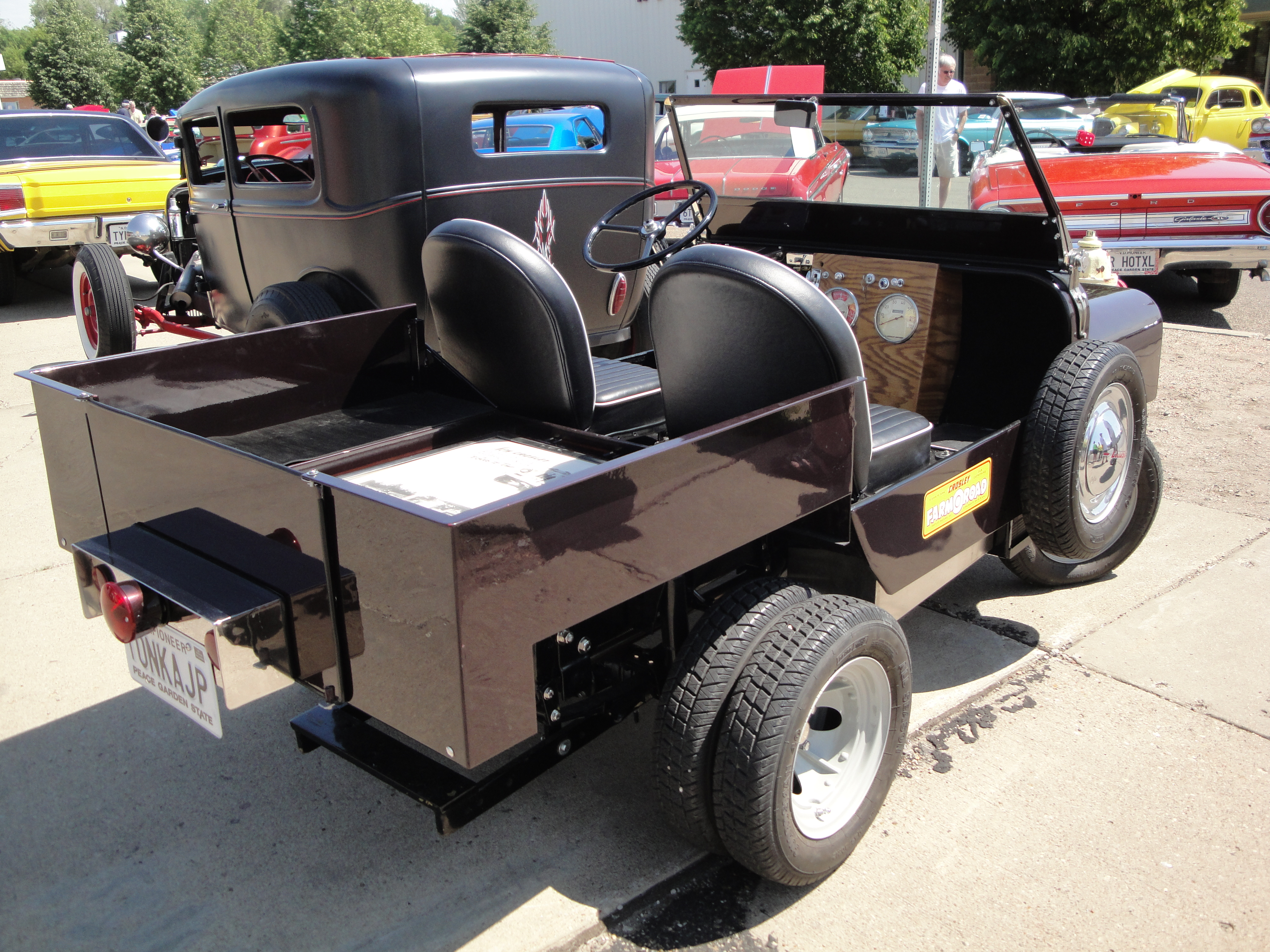
Farm-O-Road fitted with both: optional (tilting) cargo bed, and dual rear wheels.

Photos by Greg Gjerdingen; under CC BY 2.0 license

Options included dual rear wheels, a detachable pickup bed which could come with a hydraulic dump, power take-offs on both front and rear, a rear seat, a soft-top, and side window curtains. An extensive range of farm-implement attachments was available, including a 10 in (250 mm) single bottom plow, a moldboard plow, snow plow, a cutter-bar mower, sickle-bar mower, three-gang reel-type mower, a rolling coulter, disc harrow, cultivator, hay rake, row crop seeders, fertilizer unit, row guide, velocity governor, hand throttle, radiator chaff screen, post-hole digger, and spring blocks. Crosley even offered steel front snow skis that could be strapped to the front tires to convert the Farm-O-Road into a snowmobile. For the rest, equipment was spartan. Most Farm-O-Roads had only one windshield wiper – a right wiper was optional; and a heater or radio were not offered.

Exact production numbers are not known, but historians with the Crosley Automobile Club estimate less than 600 Farm-O-Roads were built. Later, Crofton Marine Engineering bought the rights and tooling for the rig and put it back into production from '59-'63 as the "Crofton Bug", resulting in another ~250 units. The Farm-O-Road measured 91.5 in (2,320 mm) long (without the optional, detachable bed) by 48 in (1,200 mm) wide (excluding the side-mounted spare wheel), and 56.5 in (1,440 mm) high (with the windshield and top up), and offered a 500 lb (230 kg) payload. Axles were rigid front and rear – as on all other Crosleys – with a 5.38:1 ratio Spicer 23 in the rear.

The little 1950 vehicle was also compared with the 1959/1960 M422 Mighty Mite, the U.S. military's smallest jeep, originally with a 65 in (1,700 mm) wheelbase.

== Engines ==
=== Waukesha Model 150 Cub Twin ===
The original engine is the Waukesha Model 150 Cub Twin, a 35.1 cu in (575 cc) or 38.9 cu in (637 cc) air-cooled L-head opposed twin-cylinder engine, putting out 14 hp (10 kW) at 3,200 rpm, built by Waukesha Engines of Waukesha, Wisconsin, and used from 1939 through 1942. The engine was originally designed to power orchard sprayers. However, many of the over 12,000 built between 1938 and 1944 were used in the pre-war (1939–42) Crosley mini-cars and the military during WWII, some of which were also used for Auxiliary Power Units (APU).

It was replaced in 1946 with the CoBra (for "Copper Brazed"), a 44.2 cu in (724 cc) overhead-cam four with a 2.5 in (63.5 mm) bore and 2.25 in (57.2 mm) stroke. That engine in turn was replaced in 1949 by the new and more reliable CIBA (Crosley Cast Iron Block Assembly) engine utilizing five main bearings.

=== Crosley CoBra (1946–1949) ===
CoBra engine (1946–1949)

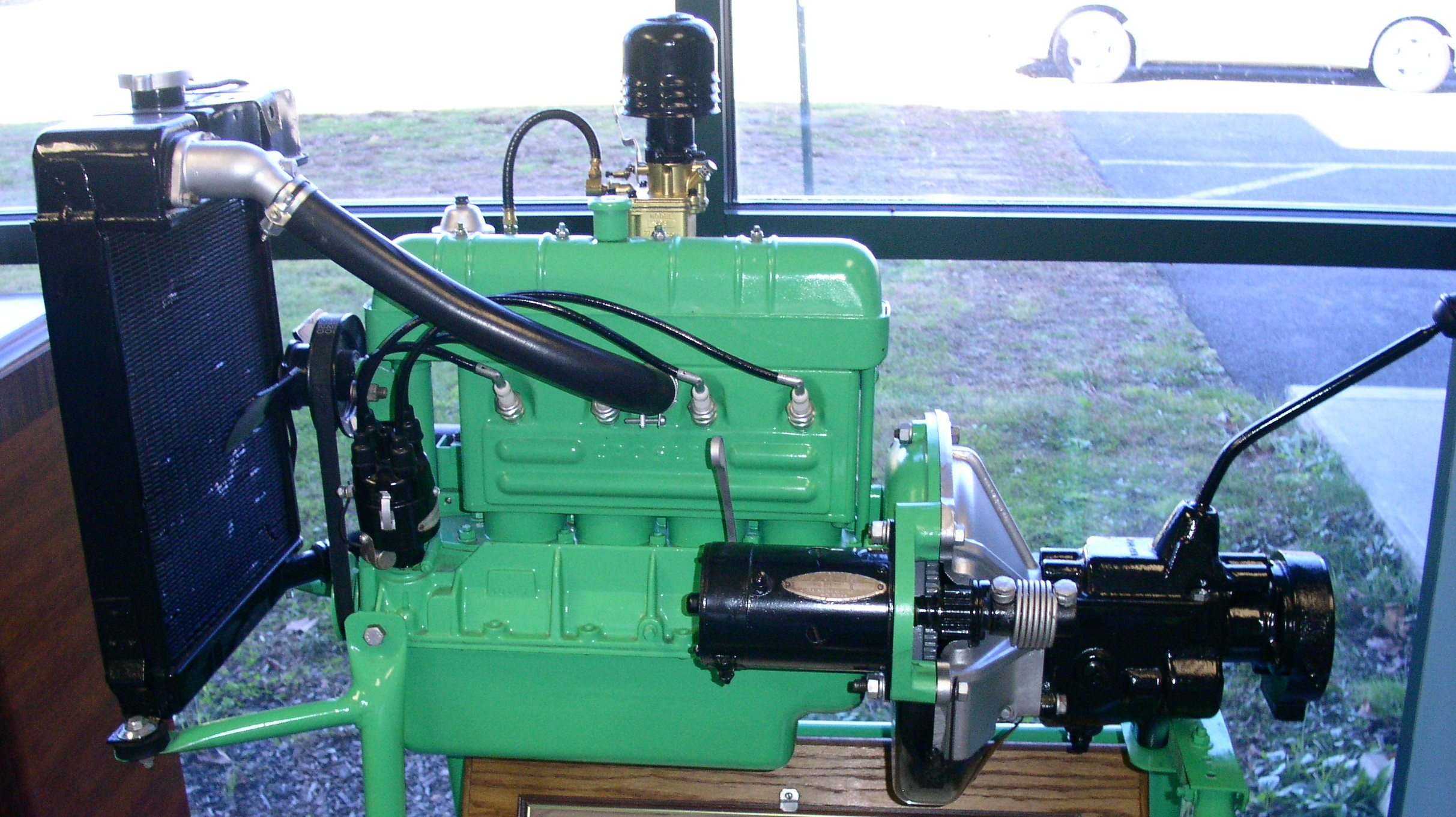
Crosley CoBra Engine Complete with Transmission

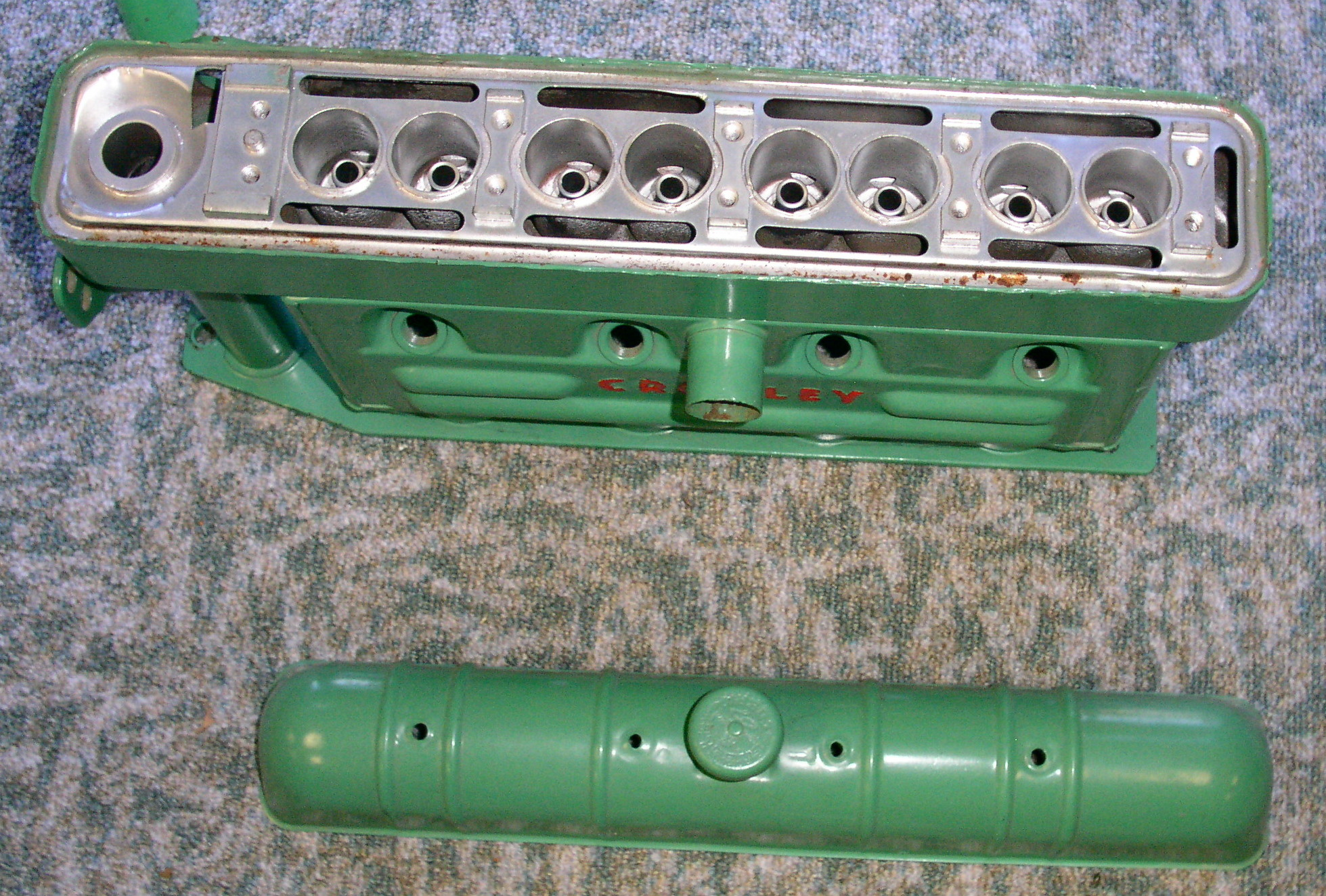
Crosley CoBra Block and Valve Cover

The CoBra (Copper Brazed, also known as "The Mighty Tin") was originally developed by Lloyd Taylor, of Taylor Engines in California, for military use aboard PT boats and Boeing B-17 Flying Fortress bombers. The engine was made from sheet metal rather than cast iron like most other engines. This was done to get a thin, uniform wall thickness and thus avoid the creation of hot spots around the combustion chamber that could ignite the fuel, causing pre-ignition (knocks), which in turn limited the compression ratio. These engines were used mainly to power generators, refrigeration compressors, etc., and were widely praised for their successes in the war effort.

The engine was adopted for automobile use in 1946. It was a small, lightweight engine with single overhead camshaft driven by two sets of bevel gears and a vertical shaft at the front of the block. It was America's first overhead camshaft automobile engine to be produced in five-figure numbers, after Duesenberg built some 650 overhead cam Straight Eights from 1921 to 1926. The unitary block and cylinder head weighed only 14.8 pounds (6.7 kg) dry; complete with all accessories (including the flywheel) weighing only 133 pounds (60 kg). The engine displaced 44 cu in (724 cc) and produced 26.5 hp (20 kW) at 5,400 rpm and 33 lb⋅ft (45 N⋅m) at 1,200 rpm. Because of its remarkable power to weight ratio, and super efficiency for its time, the CoBra engine has been compared to Ford's 1.0 litre inline-3 EcoBoost engine. Longevity was measured in hours and was strictly controlled by equipment maintenance schedules for the wartime duties, but corrosion became a problem for these engines in civilian service. This problem with these automotive powerplants had tarnished Crosley's reputation by 1948.

=== Crosley CIBA (1949–1952; 1955) ===
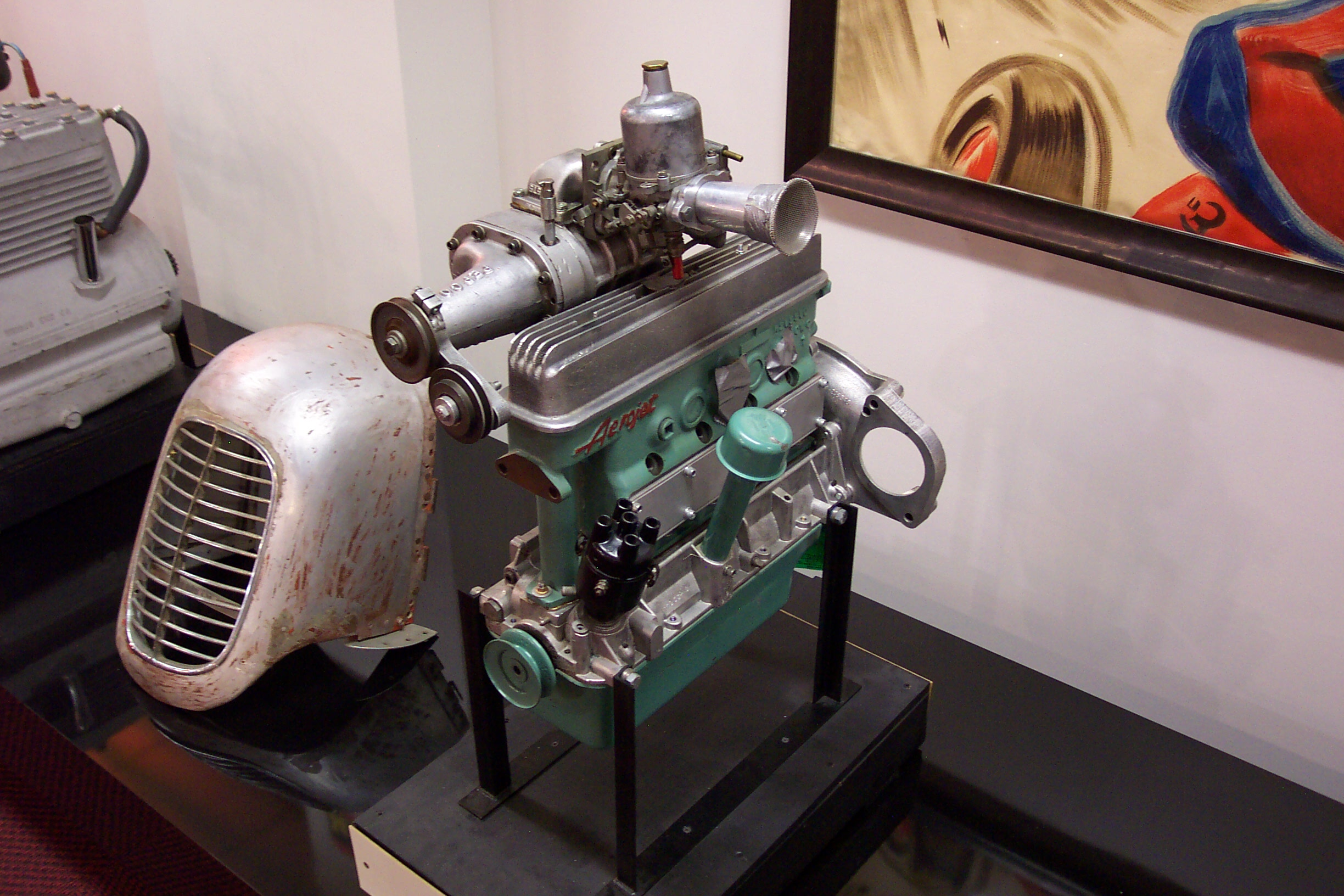
Crosley racing engine with a supercharger

The Crosley CIBA (Cast Iron Block Assembly) was a more traditional and more reliable engine utilizing a cast-iron block. Nevertheless, it had a unique design. Instead of a removable cylinder head, the combustion chambers, valve seats, cam supports, ports and cylinders are one casting, and the crankcase is another. In both the early and later cast-iron engines, the crankcase is aluminum. The 44.2 cu in (724 cc) engine produced 26.5 hp (20 kW) at 5,400 rpm and 32.5 lb⋅ft (44 N⋅m) at 3,000 rpm.

When Crosley Motors, Inc. was sold, the engine was renamed "AeroJet" and production continued. Production of the AeroJet ended in 1955 and the engine rights were sold to Fageol and later to a series of different companies ending in 1972 with the Fisher-Pierce Bearcat 55. Maritime modifications mostly included increasing displacement and converting the engine to operate with a vertical axis.

In Europe, the Crosley CIBA would be used to great advantage in 750cc sports car class, eventually maturing to a double overhead camshaft (DOHC) design used in the Bandini 750 sport internazionale as well as Nardi 750LM and Siata Amica.

== Notable Crosley owners ==
- Gordon Baxter (HotShot, story in his book Bax & Car & Driver: The Best of Gordon Baxter)
- General Omar Bradley
- Humphrey Bogart (Two-cylinder Crosley)
- David Carradine (VC Super Sports)
- Kenny Delmar ('Senator Claghorn' on The Fred Allen Show)
- Tommy Dorsey
- President Dwight D. Eisenhower (1951 CD Surrey)
- Geraldine Farrar (Two-cylinder Crosley)
- Paulette Goddard (Two-cylinder Crosley)
- Pamela Harriman (purchased the first 1939 Crosley)
- George M. Humphrey, Secretary of the Treasury
- Art Linkletter (1952 CD Sport Convertible)
- James May (1947 CC Four) (bought for television programme The Grand Tour, and for his own torture)
- Alex Raymond, Flash Gordon cartoonist (Crosley-Bandini)
- Nelson Rockefeller, Governor of New York (1950 HotShot)
- Gloria Swanson (Two-cylinder Crosley)
- Boy George (VC Super Sports)
- Fred Waring (Two-cylinder Crosley)
- Frank Lloyd Wright (1952 VC Super .Sports)
- John Westling (1947 2 door coupe)
- Alec Rohaley (1948 2 door wagon)

== See also ==
- Powel Crosley Jr.
- Lewis M. Crosley
- WLW
- List of defunct United States automobile manufacturers
