= Elizabeth Cromley =

American historian

Elizabeth Collins Cromley was an American historian who died in April, 2026. She was a professor emerita of architectural history at Northeastern University.

Cromley graduated from the University of Pennsylvania with a degree in art history and then received a Master of Arts from the New York University Institute of Fine Arts and then a PhD in art history from the Graduate Center of the City University of New York.

== Books ==
- Alone Together: A History of New York’s Early Apartments (Cornell University Press, 1990)
- The Food Axis—Cooking, Eating, and the Architecture of American Houses (University of Virginia Press, 2010)
- Experiencing American Houses: Understanding How Domestic Architecture Works (University of Tennessee Press, 2022)
