= Jennifer Cromley =

American educational psychologist

Jennifer Grace Cromley is an American educational psychologist who studies both student understanding of scientific illustrations and illustrated text, and student achievement and retention in the STEM pipeline. She is a professor of educational psychology in the University of Illinois Urbana-Champaign College of Education.

== Education and career ==
Cromley graduated summa cum laude from Yale University in 1986 with an individualized major in work studies. Next, she worked from 1986 to 1995 as a union researcher, pollster, and health and safety trainer. In 1995 she began working in literacy programs, and by 2001 she returned to graduate study in human development at the University of Maryland, College Park. She completed her Ph.D. in 2005 with the dissertation Reading Comprehension Component Processes in Early Adolescence, supervised by Roger Azevedo.

On completing her Ph.D. in 2005, she joined the Temple University College of Education as an assistant professor of psychological studies in education. She was tenured there as an associate professor in 2011. In 2014, she moved to the University of Illinois Urbana-Champaign, and she was promoted to full professor in 2018.

== Recognition ==
Cromley was a 2010 recipient of the Presidential Early Career Award for Scientists and Engineers.
