= USS Crosley =

Two ships of the United States Navy have been named USS Crosley in honor of Walter S. Crosley.

- USS Crosley (DE-108), was a destroyer escort commissioned in 1944
- USS Crosley (APD-87), was a high speed transport commissioned in 1944
