= Lewis M. Crosley =

American industrialist and businessman

Lewis M. Crosley (November 24, 1888 – November 6, 1978) of Cincinnati, Ohio was an American industrialist and businessman. He was the brother of Powel Crosley Jr. Lewis Crosley is credited with being his more famous brother's business partner in pioneering ventures in early 20th century broadcasting and consumer products in the automotive and appliance industries. He was a vice president of the Cincinnati Reds baseball team.

He was inducted into the Automotive Hall of Fame in 2010.
