= Lancia Flaminia =

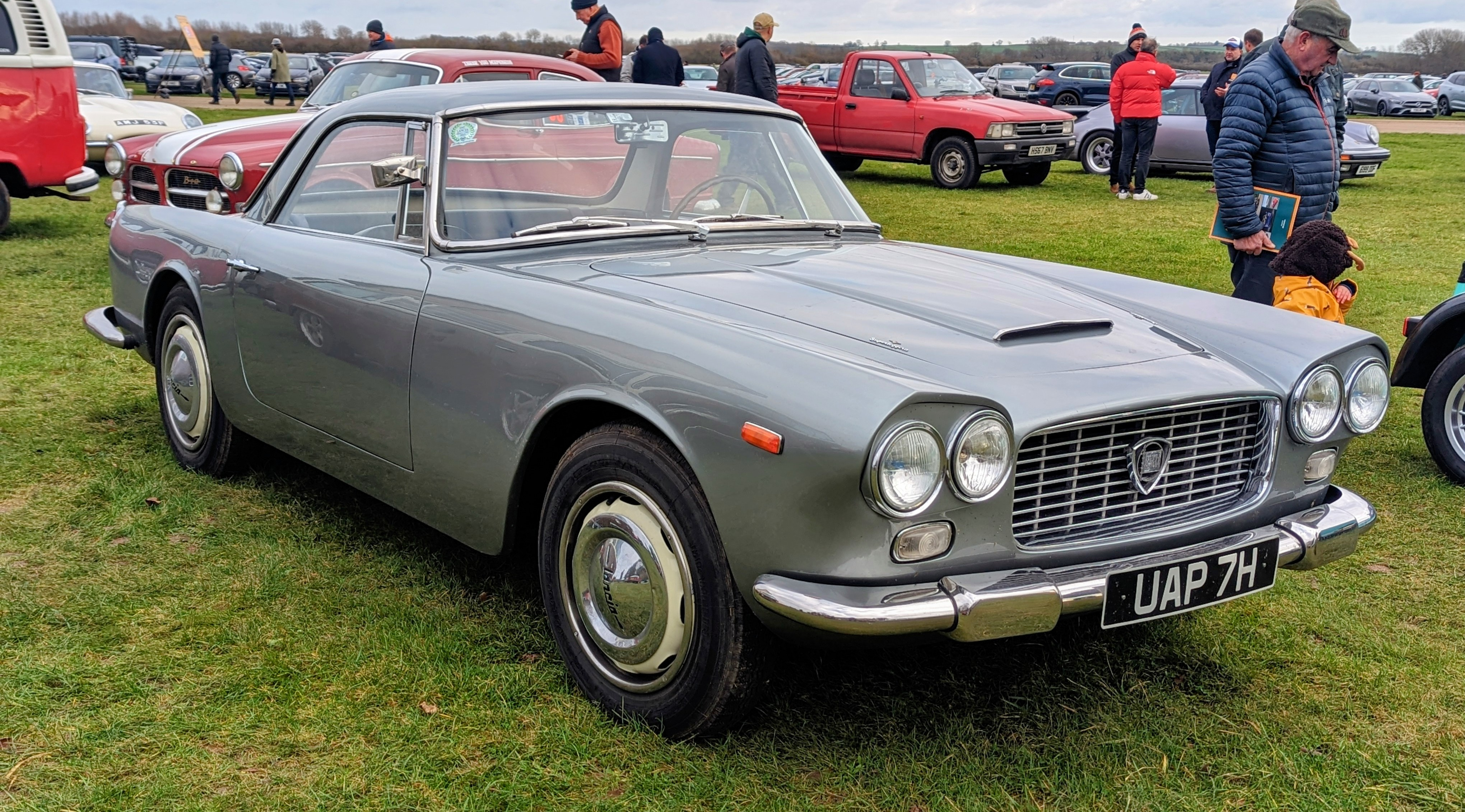
- 1961 Lancia Flaminia GT

Overview
- Manufacturer: Lancia
- Production: 1957–1970
- Assembly: Italy: Borgo San Paolo, Turin (Berlina); Grugliasco, Turin (Coupé and 335); Nova Milanese, Lombardy (GT, GTL and Convertibile); Portello, Milan (Sport and Super Sport)
- Designer: Pininfarina (Berlina, Coupé, 335); Ercole Spada at Zagato (Sport/Super Sport); Carrozzeria Touring (GT, GTL, Convertibile)

Body and chassis
- Class: Luxury car (F)
- Body style: 4-door saloon (Pininfarina); 2-door coupé (Pininfarina); 2-door coupé (Zagato); 2-door coupé (Touring); 2-door convertible (Touring); 4-door landaulet (Pininfarina)
- Layout: Front-engine, rear-wheel-drive

Powertrain
- Engine: 2.5 L tipo 813/823 V6; 2.8 L tipo 826 V6
- Transmission: 4-speed manual; 4-speed Saxomat semi-automatic

Dimensions
- Wheelbase: Berlina: 2,870 mm (113.0 in); Coupé: 2,515 mm (99.0 in)
- Length: Berlina: 4,877 mm (192.0 in); Coupé: 4,680 mm (184.3 in); GTL: 4,530 mm (178.3 in); GT/Sport: 4,495 mm (177.0 in); Super Sport: 4,420 mm (174.0 in)
- Width: Berlina: 1,753 mm (69.0 in); GT: 1,651 mm (65.0 in)
- Height: Berlina: 1,473 mm (58.0 in); Coupé: 1,420 mm (55.9 in); GTL: 1,370 mm (53.9 in); GT/Sport: 1,305 mm (51.4 in); Super Sport: 1,280 mm (50.4 in)
- Kerb weight: Berlina: 1,430 kg (3,153 lb); Coupé: 1,440 kg (3,175 lb)

Chronology
- Predecessor: Lancia Aurelia
- Successor: Lancia Gamma

The Lancia Flaminia (Tipo 813/823/824/826) is a luxury car produced by Italian automaker Lancia from 1957 until 1970. It was Lancia's flagship model at that time, replacing the Aurelia. It was available throughout its lifetime as in saloon, coupé and cabriolet body styles. The Flaminia coupés and cabriolet were coachbuilt cars with bodies from several prestigious Italian coachbuilders. Four "presidential" stretched limousines were produced by Pininfarina for use on state visits.

12,633 cars were sold over its 13 year lifespan. The coupé outsold the four-door saloon, an unusual occurrence, especially in light of the Flaminia coupés' coachbuilt bodies making them considerably more expensive than the stately Berlina. After a seven-year hiatus, the Flaminia was effectively replaced by the Gamma as Lancia's new flagship in 1976.

The Flaminia was named after the Via Flaminia, the road leading from Rome to Ariminum (Rimini). This respected the established Lancia tradition of naming individual models after Roman roads.

== Development ==
The design language of the Flaminia saloon and coupé was based on the Florida show car developed by Pinin Farina

The Flaminia's chassis was a development of the Aurelia's, but was significantly upgraded. The front suspension was changed to a more conventional configuration with double wishbones, coil springs, telescopic shock absorbers, and an anti-roll bar. The rear suspension retained the De Dion setup, with a transaxle mounted at the rear as in the Aurelia. The first Berlina was available with drum brakes or disc brakes, all other models used disc brakes only. They benefitted from the Pirelli Cinturato 165H400 CA67radial tyre technology.

The original two bodies of the Flaminia were developed by Italian automobile design house Pinin Farina and modelled after two Aurelia-based motor show specials also developed by the same, named Florida. The Florida I, presented at the 1955 Turin Auto Show, was a saloon with rear suicide doors. The Florida II, presented a year later at the Salon International de l'Auto in Geneva, was a 2-door coupé, and became Battista Farina's personal car of choice. The production version of the Flaminia debuted in 1957.

The car was designed by Battista Farina, which later also used this design as the basis for the BMC Farina models, which included the Austin Westminster, the most similarly sized BMC car to the Lancia Flaminia.

=== Development timeline ===
- Spring 1955: Debut of the Pinin Farina Florida saloon based on Lancia Aurelia's chassis designed by Pinin Farina.
- March 1956 (Geneva): Debut of Pinin Farina Florida coupe designed by Pinin Farina.
- April 1956 (Turin): Debut of the Lancia Flaminia with 'suicide' door and coil spring suspension.
- March 1957 (Geneva): Debut of the production version of the Lancia Flaminia.

== Engines ==
The Flaminia's engine was an evolution of the world's first production V6, which was introduced in the Aurelia. It had increased bore and decreased stroke. The engines were mounted longitudinally, powering the rear wheels through a 4-speed rear-mounted transaxle. A version with increased displacement was introduced in 1962.

Engines
Year	Displacement	Configuration	Power	Notes
1957–1961	2.5 L (2,458 cc; 150.0 cu in)	Single-carburetor	102 CV (75 kW; 101 hp)	
1957–1962	2.5 L (2,458 cc; 150.0 cu in)	Single-carburetor	119 CV (88 kW; 117 hp)	2-door versions
1961–1963	2.5 L (2,458 cc; 150.0 cu in)	Single-carburetor	110 CV (81 kW; 108 hp)	Different carburetor
1957–1962	2.5 L (2,458 cc; 150.0 cu in)	Triple-carburetor	140 CV (103 kW; 138 hp)	Sport, Convertibile, GT
1962–1970	2.8 L (2,775 cc; 169.3 cu in)	Triple-barrel carburetor	128 CV (94 kW; 126 hp)	Berlina
1962–1967	2.8 L (2,775 cc; 169.3 cu in)	Triple-barrel carburetor	136 CV (100 kW; 134 hp)	Coupé
1962–1967	2.8 L (2,775 cc; 169.3 cu in)	Triple-barrel carburetor	150 CV (110 kW; 148 hp)	Sport, Convertibile, GT, and GTL
1964–1967	2.8 L (2,775 cc; 169.3 cu in)	Triple-carburetor	152 CV (112 kW; 150 hp)	Super Sport

== Body styles ==
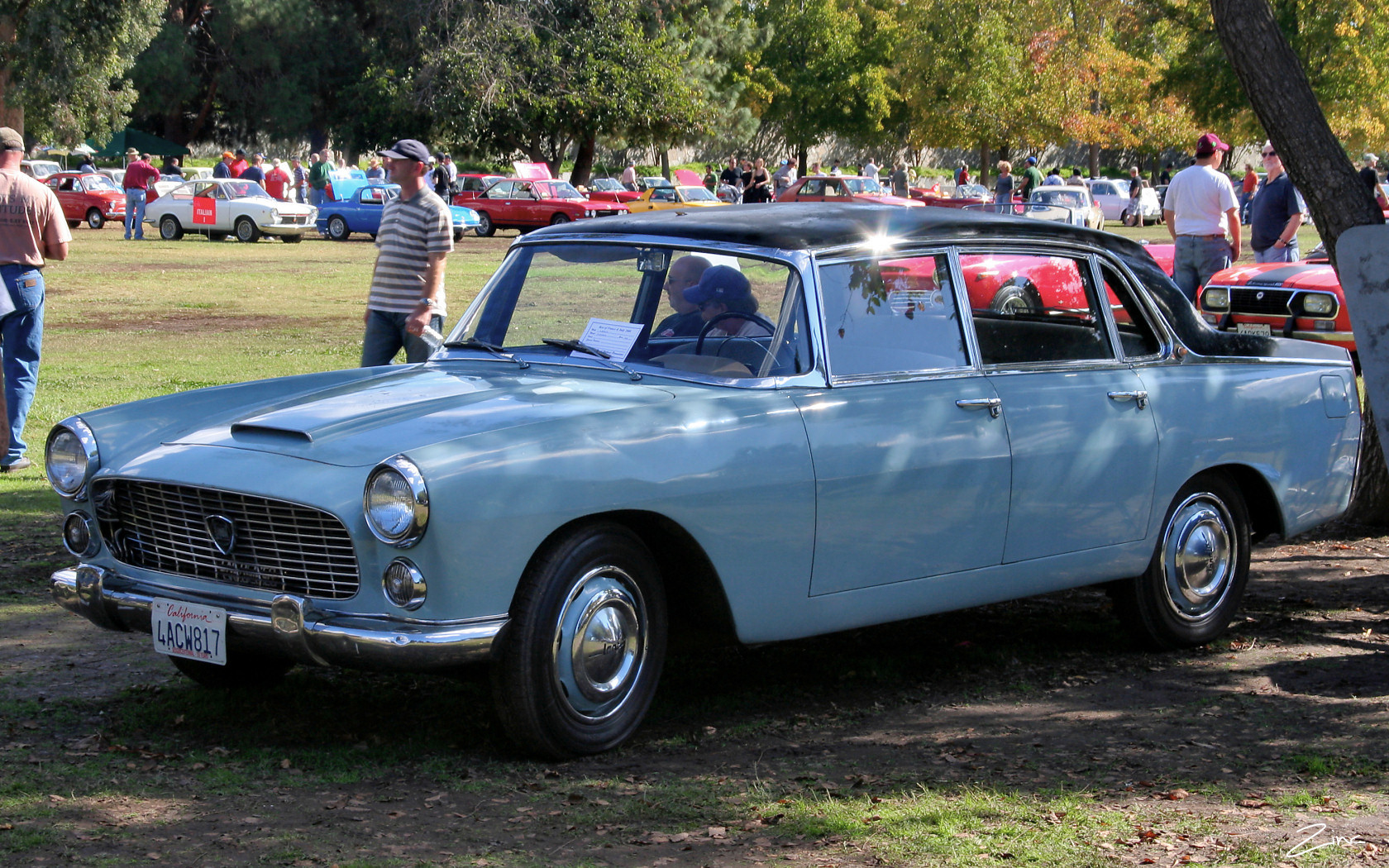
Lancia Flaminia Berlina

The Flaminia Berlina prototype was unveiled at the Turin Auto Show in March 1957. It differed from the production version by having Florida-inspired suicide rear doors that opened opposite to the front doors. The saloon version of the car was generally designated by the Italian word for this body style, Berlina. Designed by Pininfarina and based on the Florida I prototype, this was the only body style to be built by Lancia themselves, as well as becoming the only body style to last through the entire production period. 3,344 cars were built with the 2.5 L engine, and an additional 599 with the 2.8 L version of the V6 engine. They were assembled at Lancia's old facility at Borgo San Paolo as the last model to be built there.

=== Flaminia Coupé ===
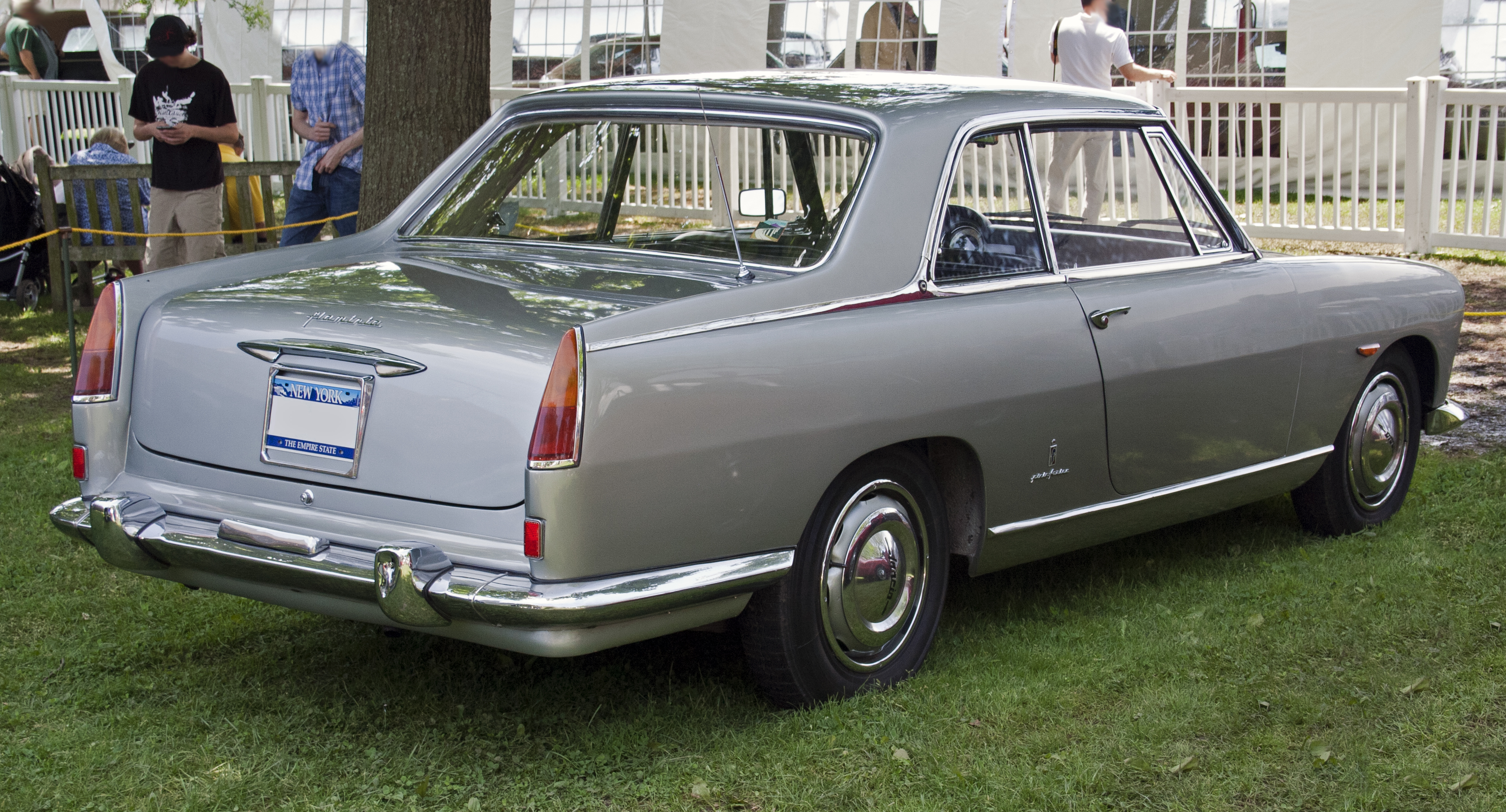
Rear three-quarters view of a Flaminia Coupé

The Coupé was also designed by Pininfarina, but was built by the coachbuilder and not at a Lancia factory. It was very similar to the Florida II prototype with a 2+2 seating layout. Like all the other 2-door versions, the Coupé had a shortened wheelbase relative to the Berlina. The front end of the Coupé does not majorly differ from the Berlina, but the headlight frames are completely round, whereas they point slightly upwards in the Berlina. The Coupé was also fitted with the unusual 175HR400 Pirelli Cinturato CA67 millimetric tyres. 5,236 cars (4,151 with the 2.5-litre engine and 1,085 with the 2.8-litre engine) were built until 1967.

=== Flaminia GT, GTL and Convertibile ===
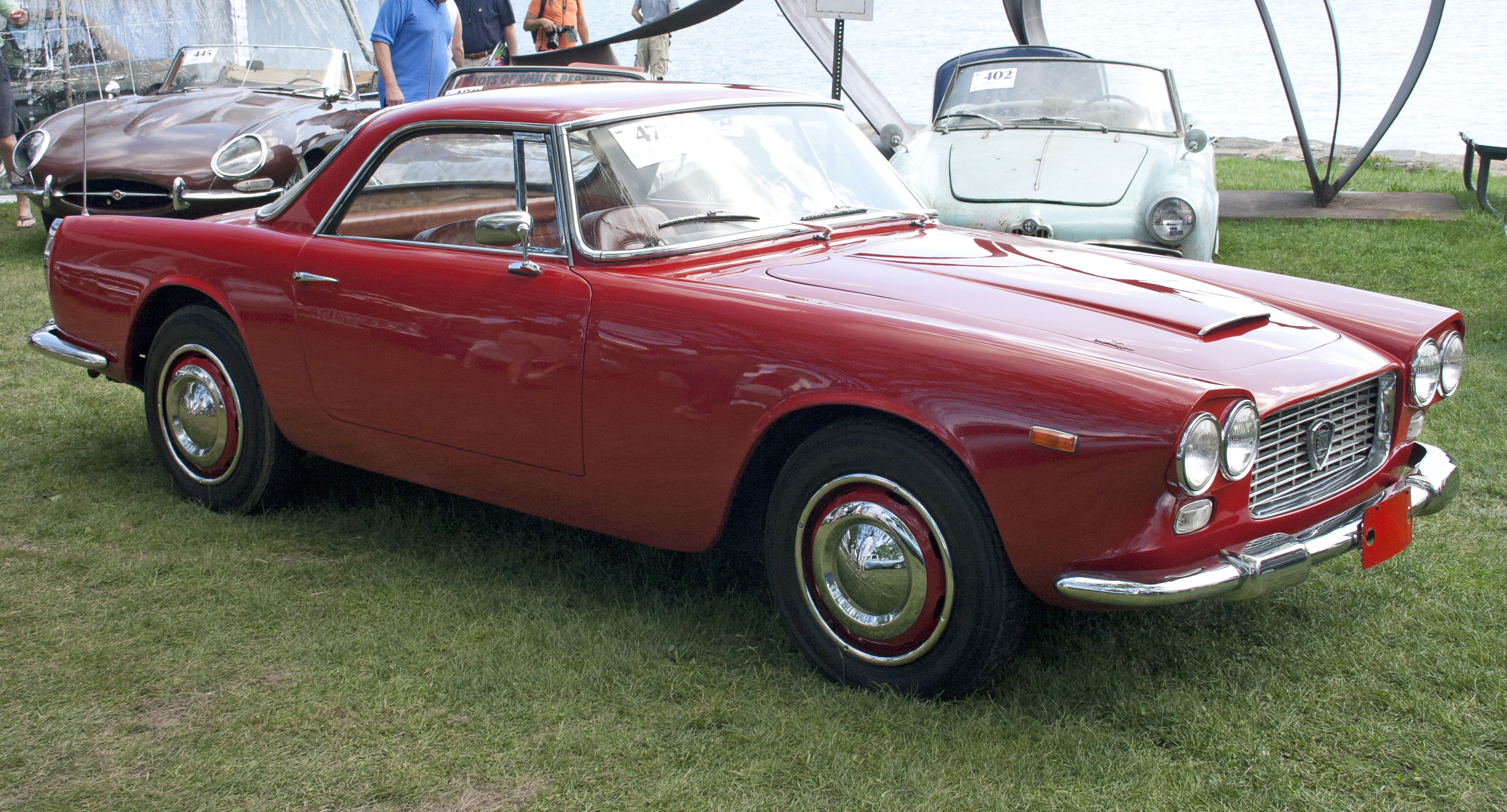
Lancia Flaminia GT, 1961

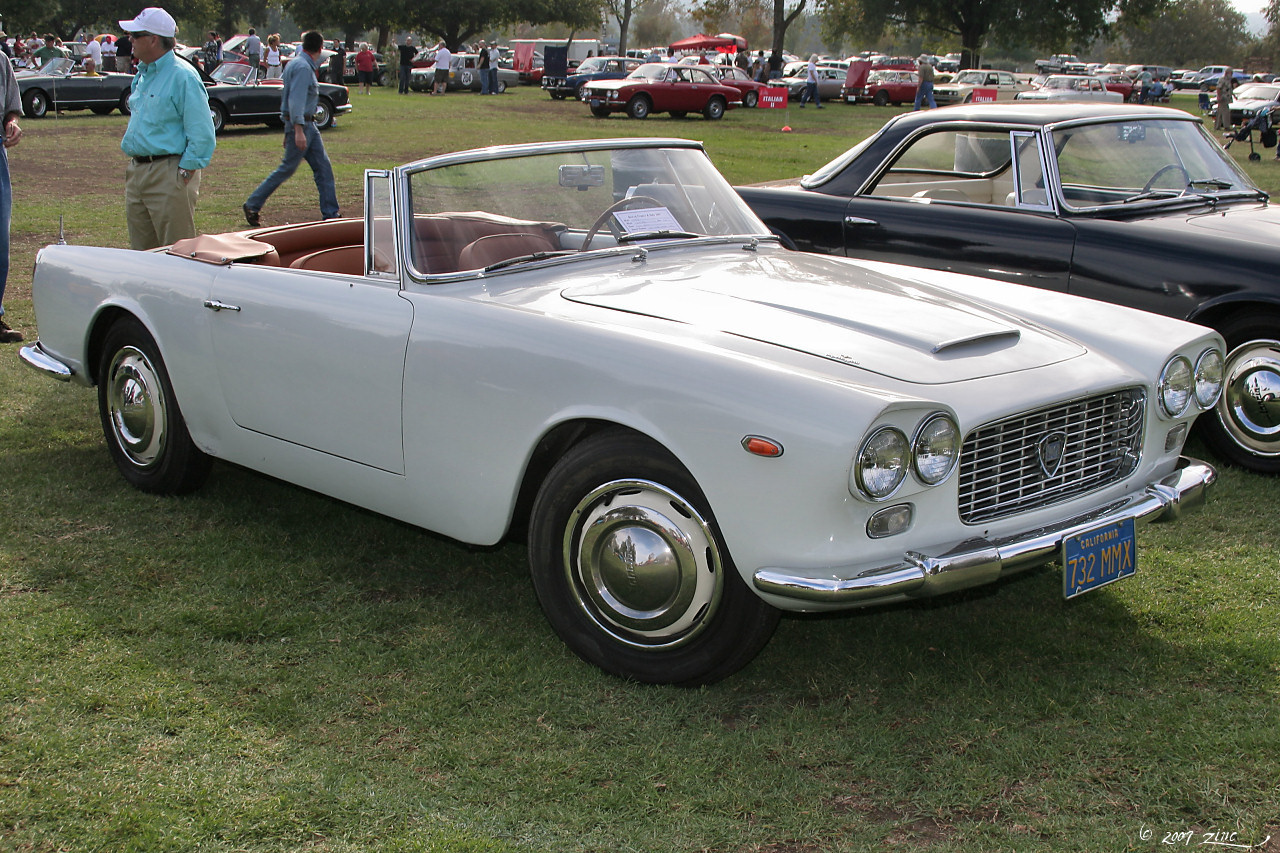
1961 Lancia Flaminia Convertibile

The GT, GTL, and Convertibile models of the Flaminia were designed and built by Carrozzeria Touring with the bodies made from aluminium. These body styles can be easily distinguished by their four round headlights (rather than two on Pininfarina-designed Flaminias), and a shorter cabin - the wheelbase was decreased significantly for the GT and Convertibile, allowing for only a two-seater layout. The GTL, introduced in 1962, was a 2+2 version of the GT with a slightly longer wheelbase. The Convertibile was in production until 1964, with 847 cars made in total (180 made with the 2.8-litre engine), while the GT and GTL were in production until 1965, with production totaling 1,718 cars for the GT and 300 cars for the GTL (out of which, 168 GTs and 297 GTLs were made with the 2.8-litre engine).

=== Flaminia Sport and Super Sport ===
The Sport was designed and built by Italian coach builder Zagato, and was also a two-seater coupé. It used the same shorter wheelbase chassis as the GT and had a very distinctive rounded aluminium body with pop-out handles. It was featured in the Ian Fleming novel, On Her Majesty's Secret Service. The Super Sport replaced the Sport in 1964, with the introduction of the 2.8 L 152 CV (112 kW; 150 hp) engine. The first Sport models had flush covered headlights, later changed to more classic round ones. The Super Sport also saw some changes - the rear was updated to a Kammback design, while the front was made more aerodynamic with distinctive tear-shape headlight casings. Until 1967, 593 Sport and Super Sport models were built (99 initial cars with flush headlamps, 344 Sports and 150 Supersports).

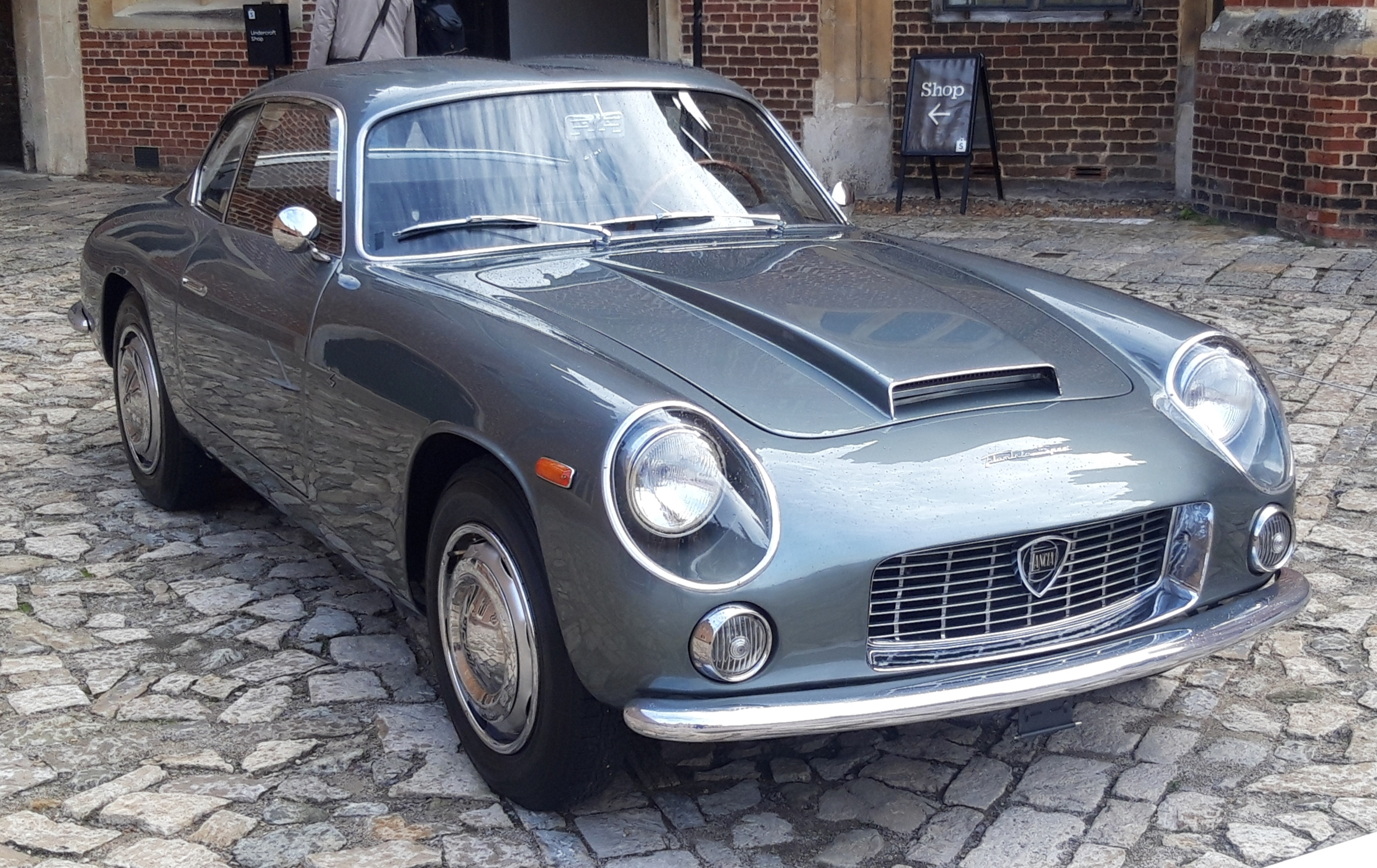
Front of Flaminia Sport Zagato, first series (note covered headlights)

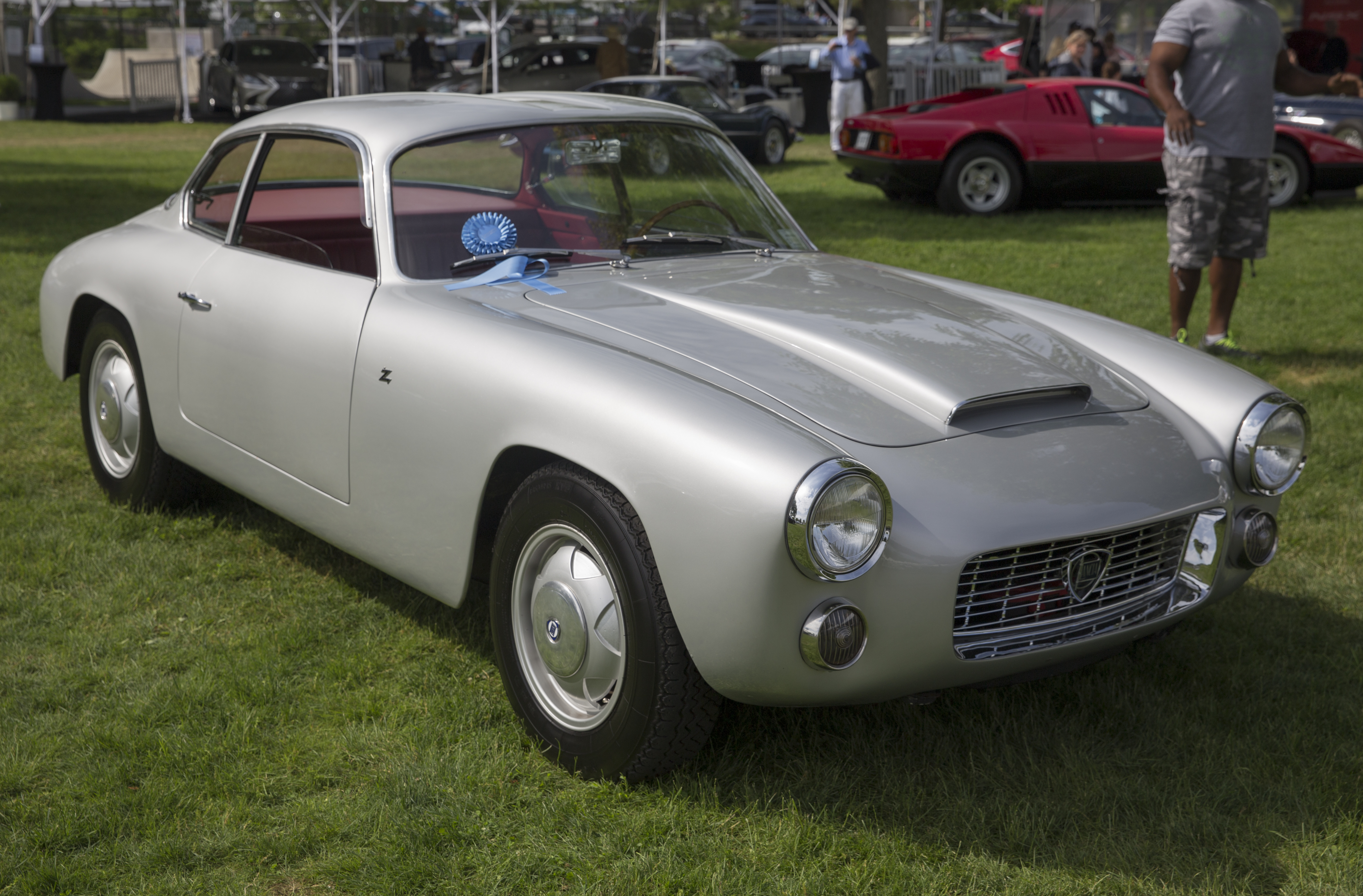
Front of Flaminia Sport Zagato, second series (1960)

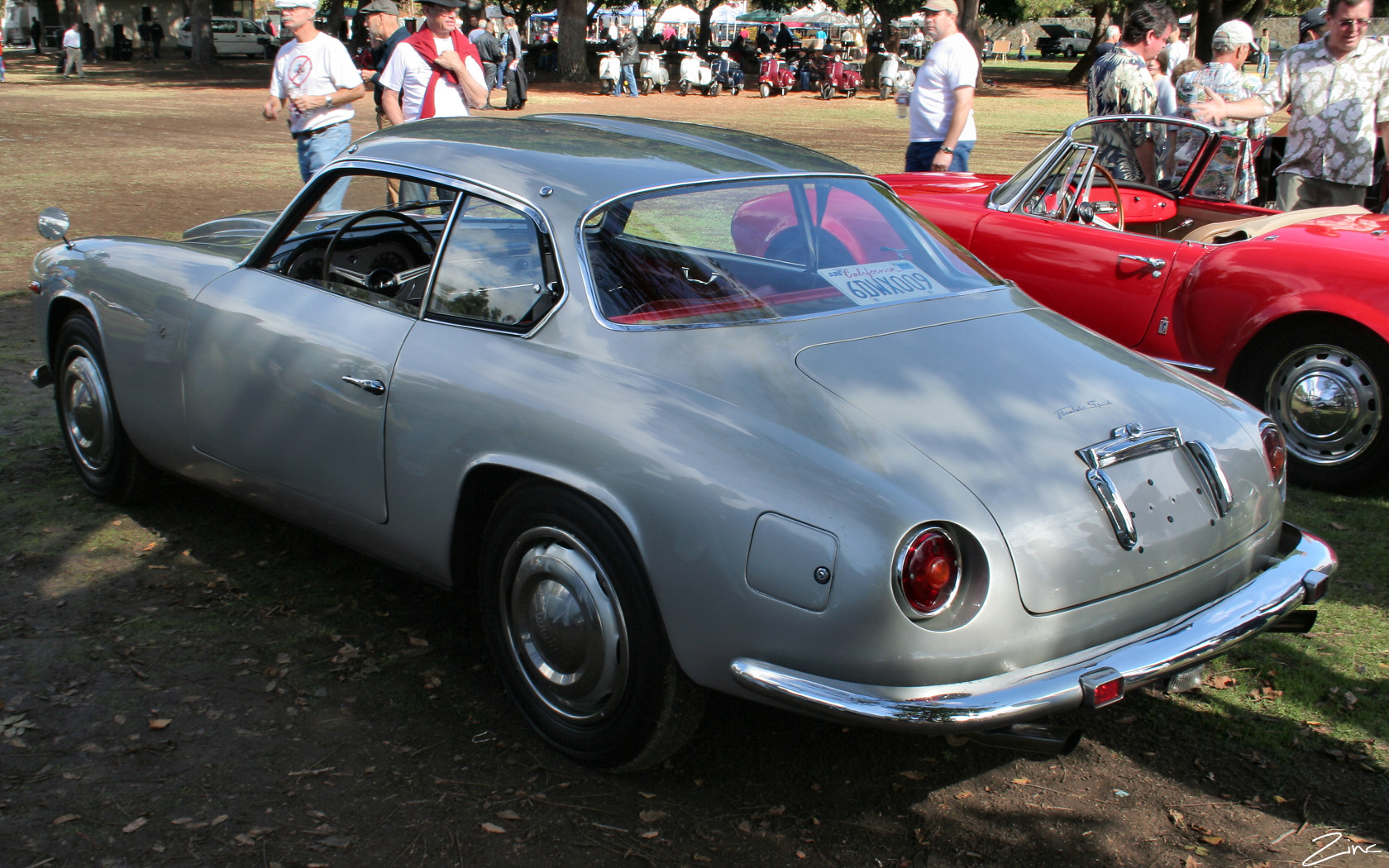
Rear of Flaminia Sport Zagato, second series (1963)

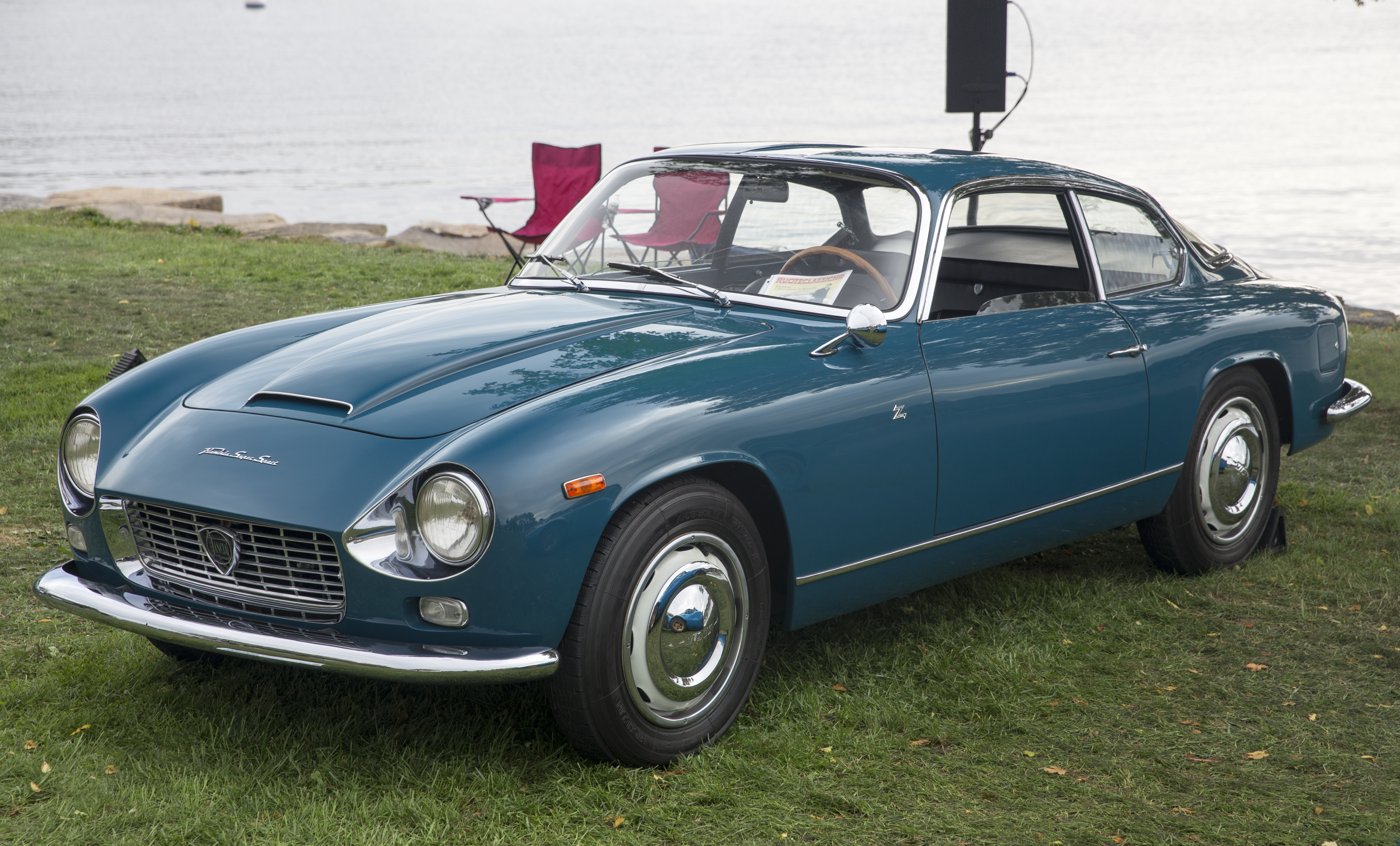
Front of Flaminia Super Sport Zagato (1964)

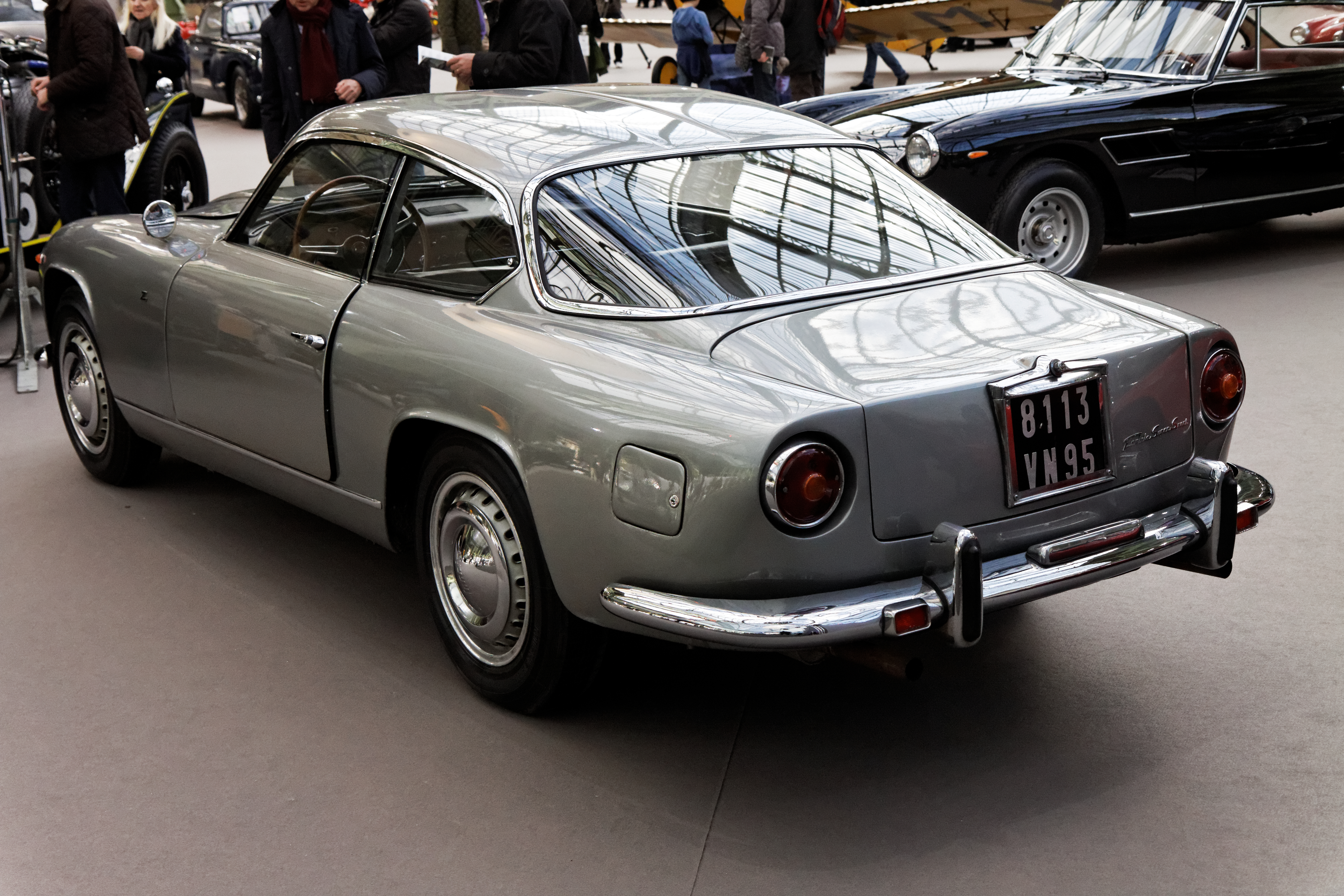
Rear of Flaminia Super Sport Zagato (1965)

== One-offs and special editions ==
=== Flaminia 335 "Presidenziale" ===
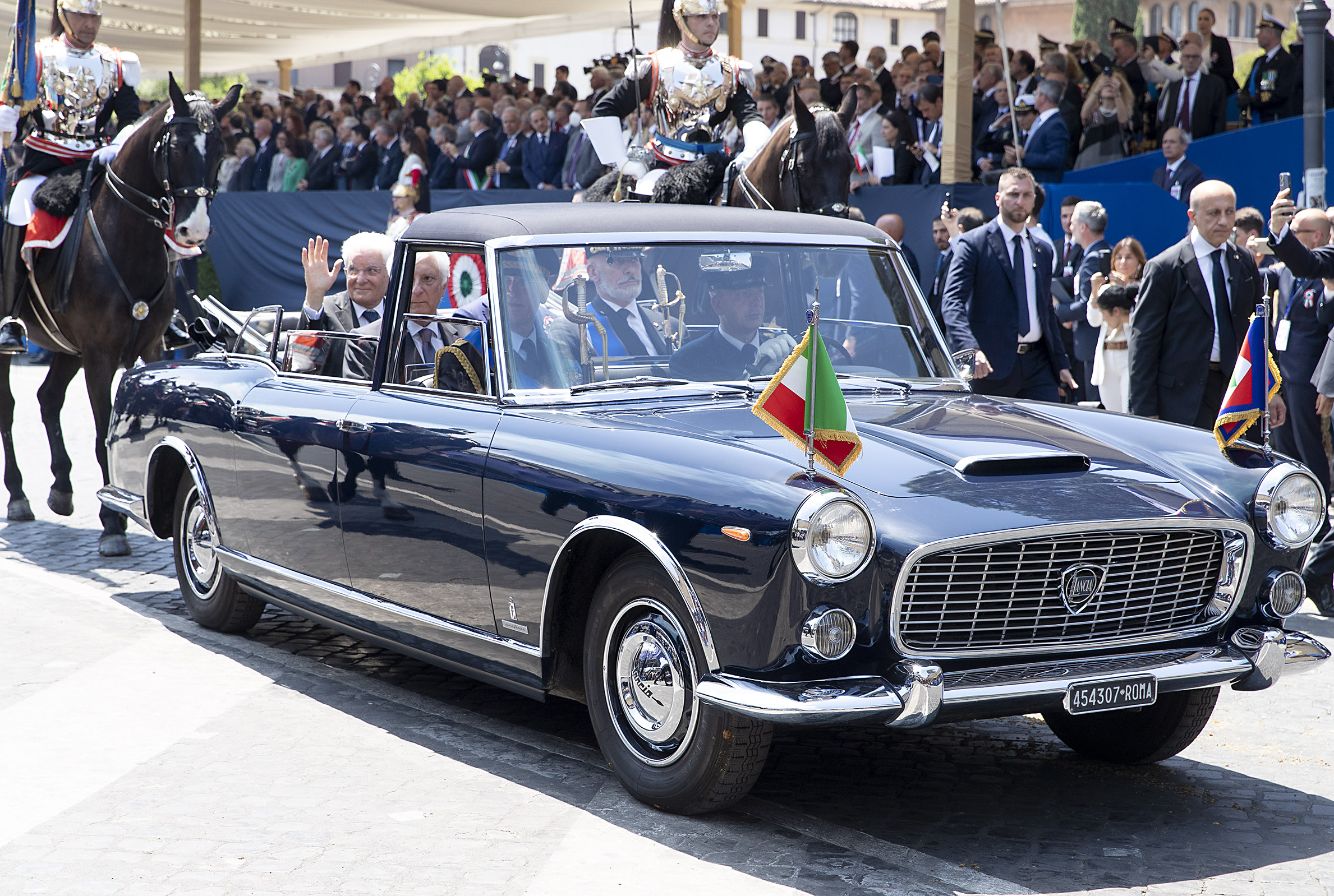
Flaminia Presidenziale

When in 1960 Queen Elizabeth II announced her visit to Italy, the then President Giovanni Gronchi commissioned Pininfarina to supply four stretched Lancia Flaminia limousines to appropriately service the visit, and also renew the dated presidential fleet. The cars were built between 1960 and 1961 in the record time of six months, to a detailed specification and with the assistance of General Motors regarding the extra equipment.

The cars had a seven-seater landaulet body style and were built in a dark blue livery with black Connolly Leather upholstery, a Voxson radio and Pirelli tyres. The cars were first used in Turin for the inauguration of the Celebrazioni del Centenario dell'Unità d'Italia (celebrations for the centenary of Italy's unification), and subsequently for the state visit of Queen Elizabeth II.

This model was officially called the Flaminia 335 (due to its wheelbase of 335 cm (131.9 in)) and is also commonly referred to as Presidenziale or Quirinale (after Quirinal Palace, the residence of the President of the Italian Republic). The individual cars were named Belsito, Belmonte, Belvedere and Belfiore.

All four cars survive today, and were restored by Fiat Auto in 2001. Two of them are on display in automobile museums: one at Museo Nazionale dell'Automobile, to which it was donated by President Carlo Azeglio Ciampi, and another at Museo Storico della Motorizzazione Militare together with other retired presidential cars. The remaining two are still kept in service for the most solemn state occasions, like the Republic Day parade or presidential inaugurations. There were rumours of a fifth 335 being donated to the Queen, but this seems unsubstantiated.

=== Flaminia Coupé Speciale ===
The Coupé Speciale was unveiled at the 1963 Turin Motor Show designed by Tom Tjaarda at Pininfarina. It was based on the Flaminia coupé with the 2.8-litre triple carburetor engine. The design of the car was a fastback with a steeply inclined rear window and trapezoidal taillights, a design feature that would appear on Tjaarda's subsequent designs as well. The car was initially painted pearl white but underwent some modifications to make it drivable on the road and was repainted in metallic silver. It was also presented at the 1964 Brussels Motor Show and the motorshows in Alassio and Cortina d’Ampezzo. After the motorshows, the car was repainted again in a champagne colour. Battista Farina replaced his Florida show car with the Coupé Speciale in 1965 as his personal car until his death in 1966. The car was sold to the president of the American Lancia Club in 1972 before being sold on to a Japanese collector who had it repainted back to its original pearl white colour.

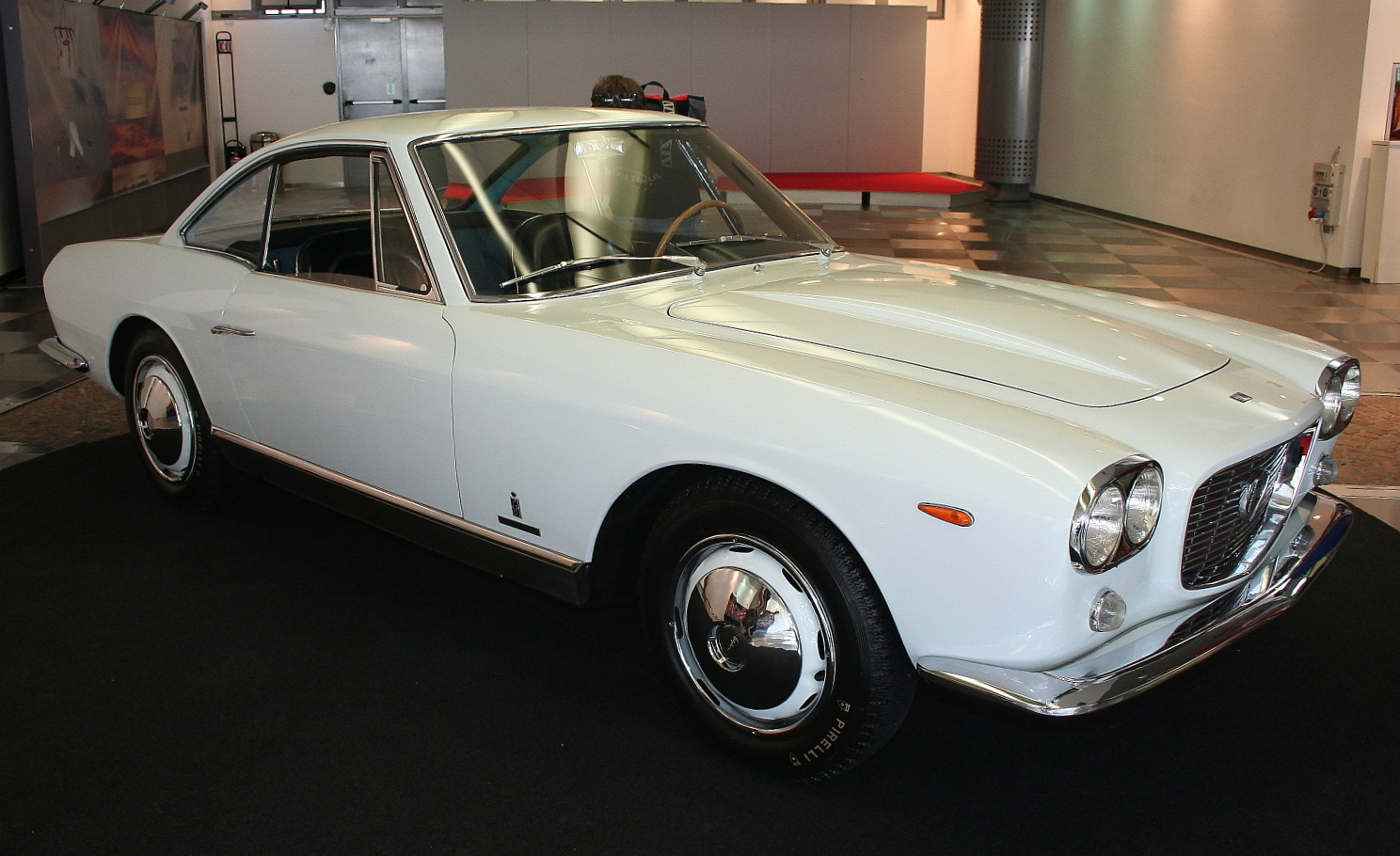
Flaminia Coupé Speciale

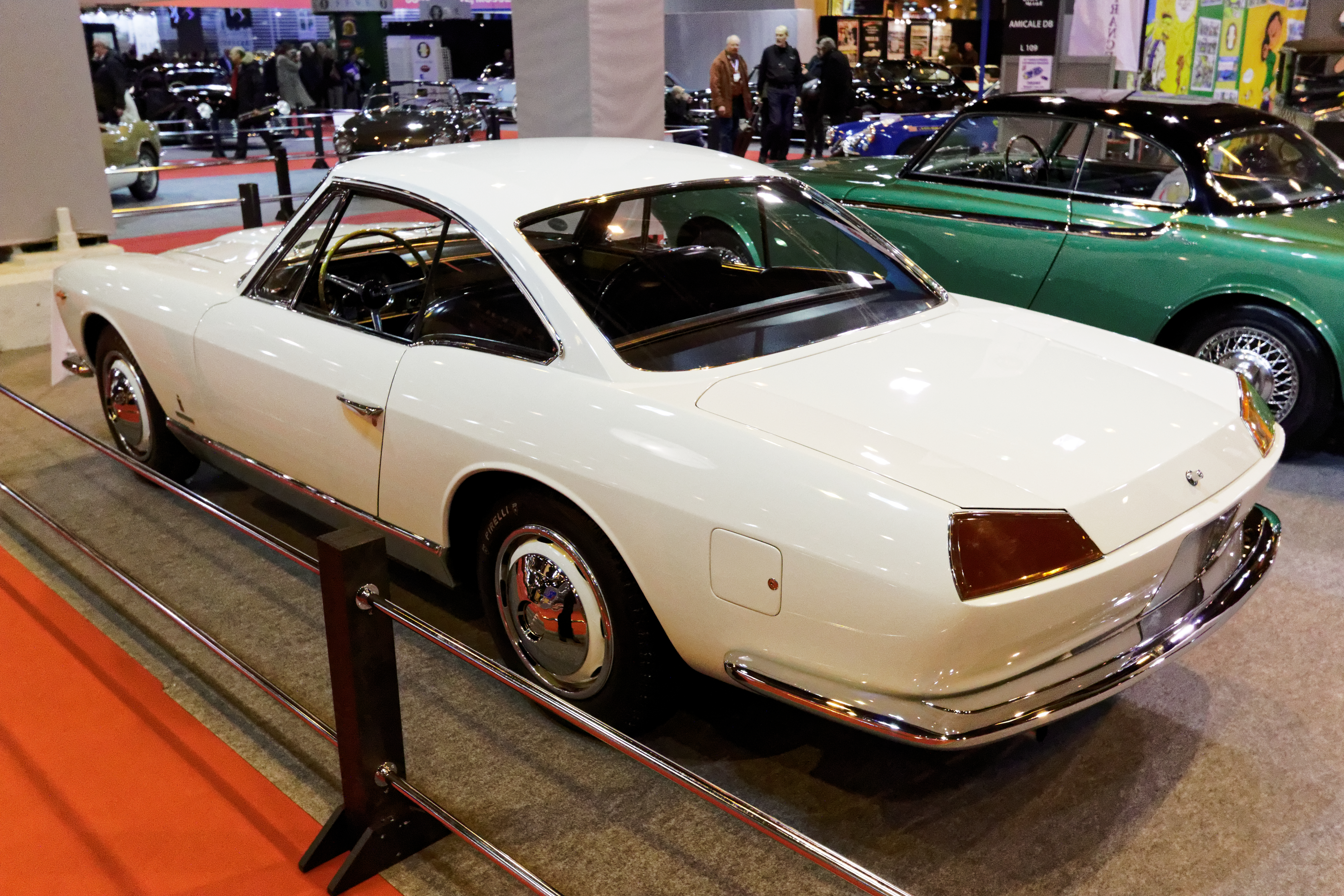
Rear view

=== Flaminia Loraymo ===
The Flaminia Loraymo was designed by American automobile designer Raymond Loewy and was unveiled at the 1960 Paris Motor Show. The car was built by Italian coachbuilder Carrozzeria Motto who specialized in making automobile bodies from aluminium. The name is an acronym of Loewy's first name and surname. The car was based on a Flaminia coupé with the 2.5-litre V6 engine tuned by Nardi to have a power output of 140 hp (142 PS; 104 kW).

The radical, aerodynamic design featured a jet-inspired front end and a coke-bottle shaped body, as was the characteristic of Loewy's design at the time. Another design highlight of the car was a roof mounted spoiler, present just above the rear window. The large grille of the car is enclosed in a chrome frame which also serves as the front bumper, it is flanked by two fog lamps attached to the grille by two fins. The front fenders of the car, which also house the integrated wing mirrors, are also open ended to allow for enhanced cooling. The car featured aerodynamic solutions considered advanced for the time such as a rear wraparound window and enclosed wheels along with flush elements. The car was a one off and remained in Loewy's personal collection. It was restored and donated to Lancia several years after Loewy's death.

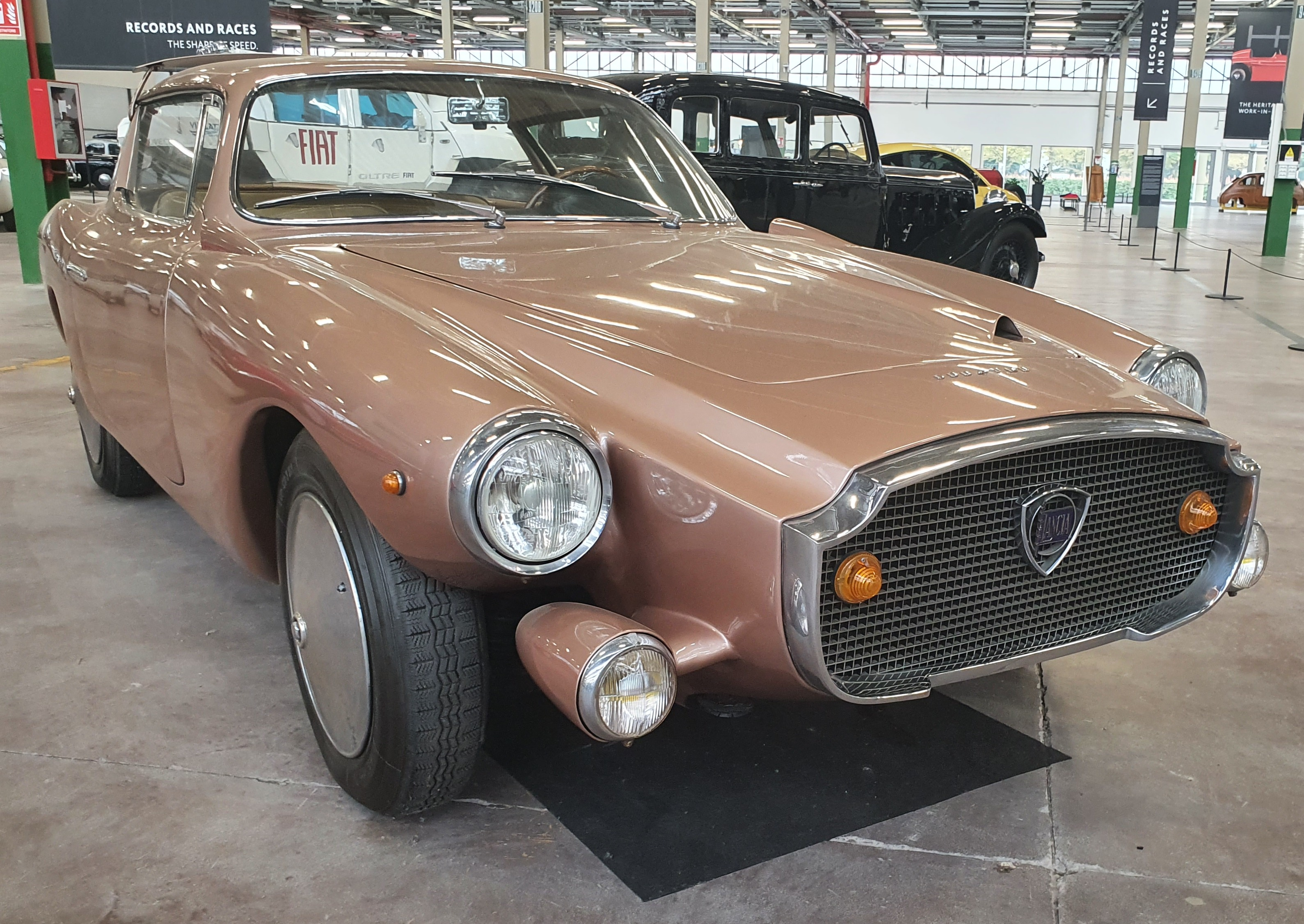
Flaminia Lorayamo

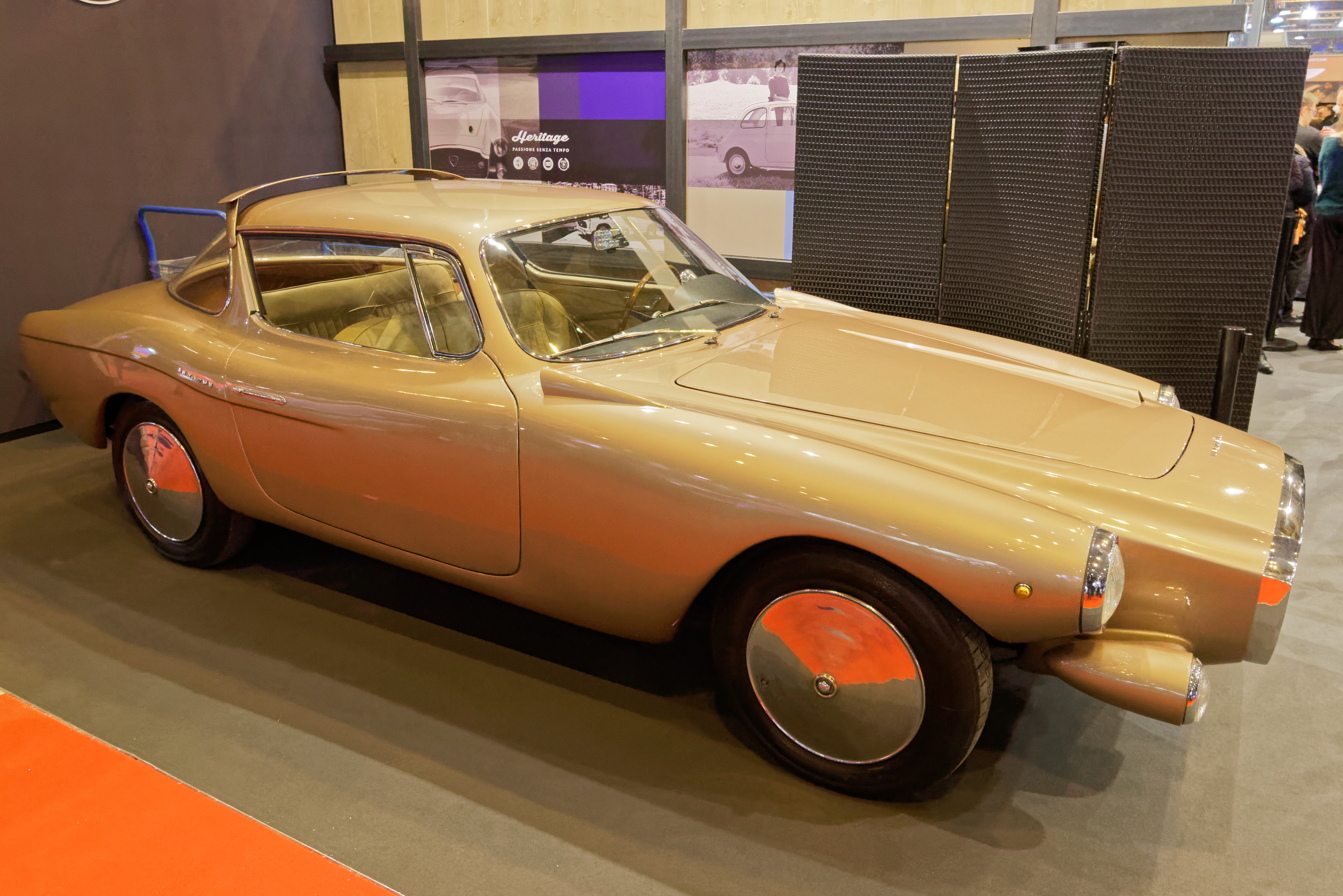
Flaminia Lorayamo front 3/4 view

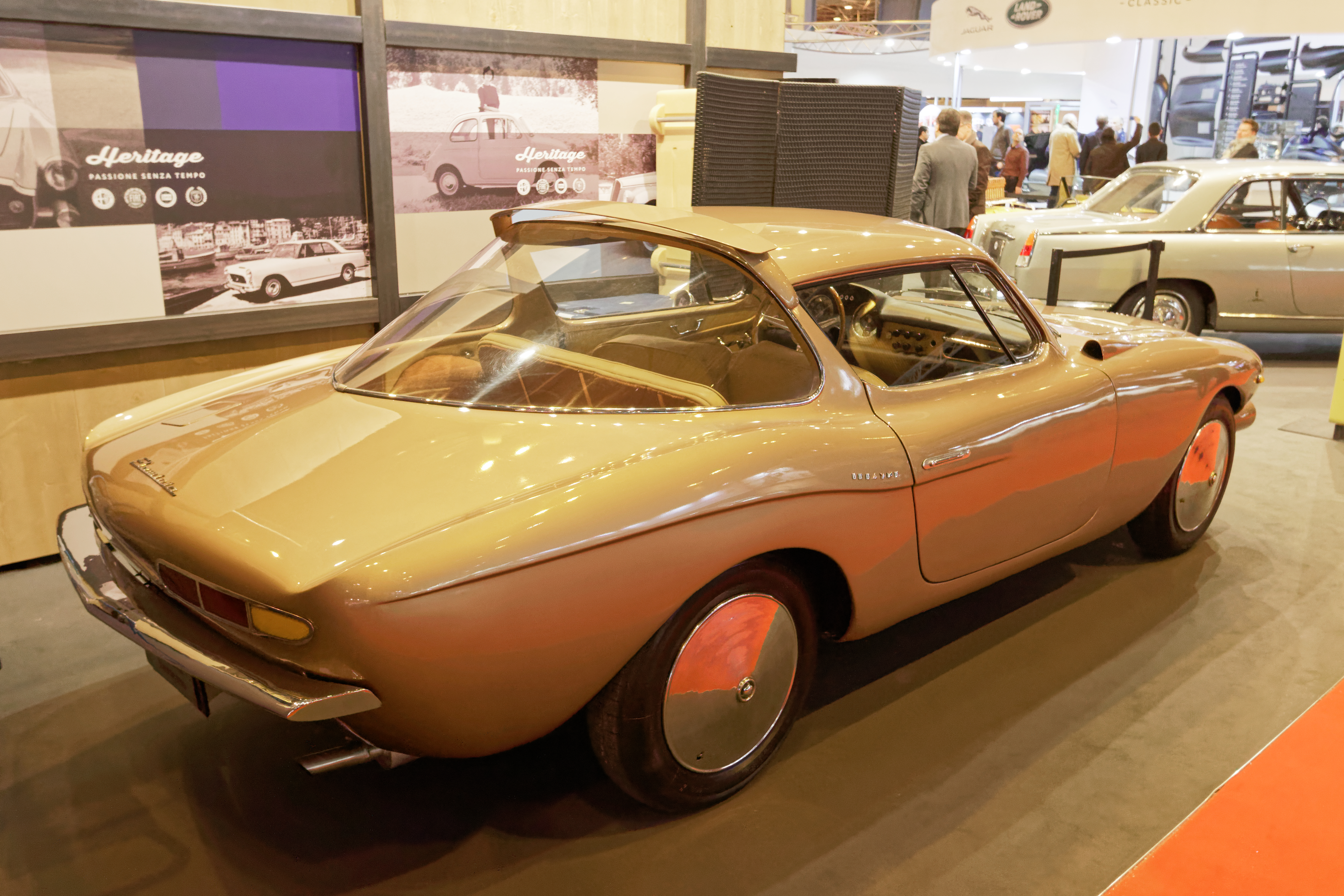
Flaminia Lorayamo rear 3/4 view
