= Lancia V6 engine =

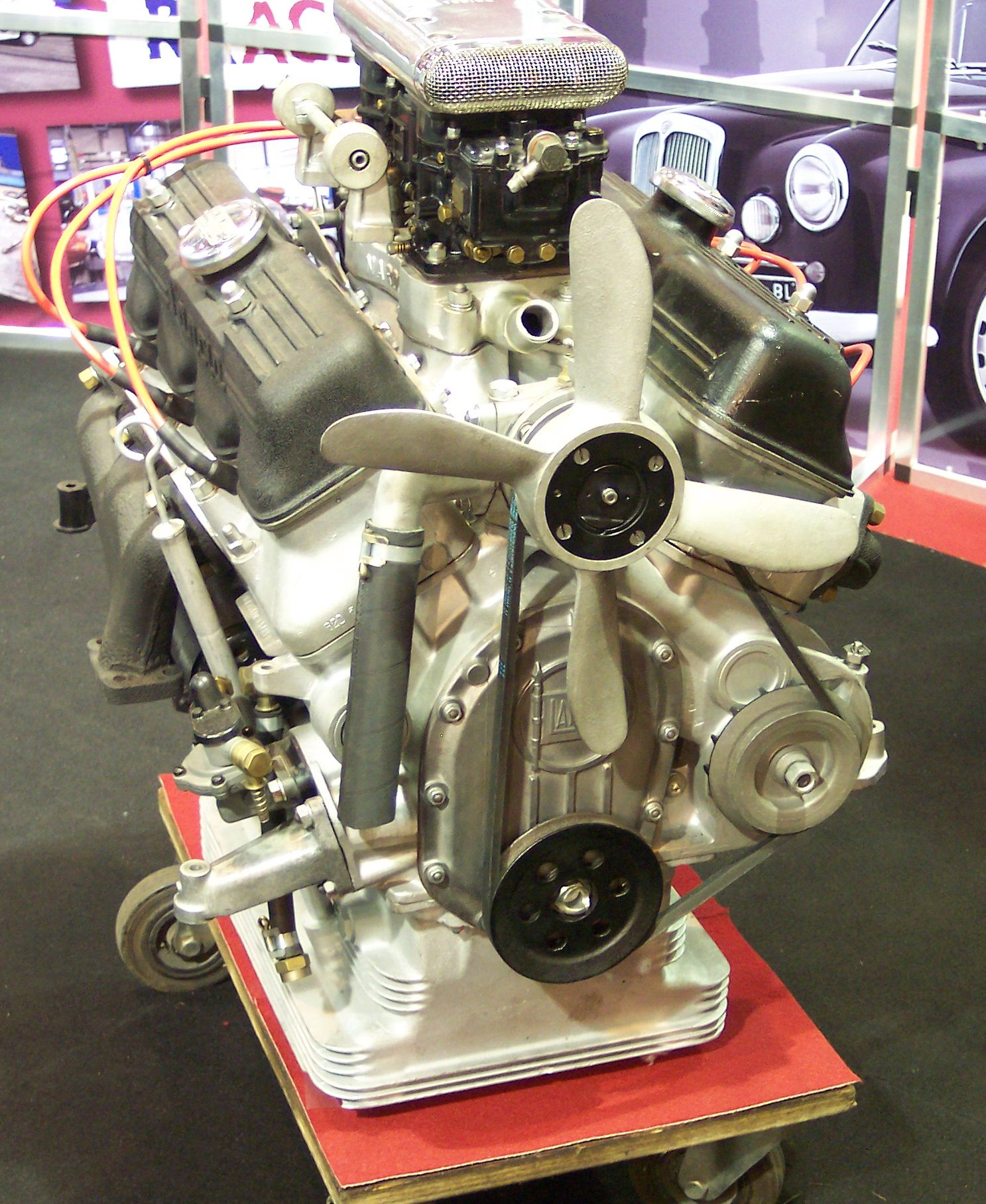

Overview
- Manufacturer: Lancia
- Production: 1950–1970

Layout
- Configuration: Naturally aspirated and supercharged 60° V6
- Displacement: 1.8 L (1,754 cc; 107.0 cu in); 2.0 L (1,991 cc; 121.5 cu in); 2.3 L (2,266 cc; 138.3 cu in); 2.5 L (2,451 cc; 149.6 cu in); 2.5 L (2,458 cc; 150.0 cu in); 2.7 L (2,693 cc; 164.3 cu in); 2.8 L (2,775 cc; 169.3 cu in); 3.0 L (2,962 cc; 180.8 cu in); 3.1 L (3,102 cc; 189.3 cu in); 3.3 L (3,284 cc; 200.4 cu in); 3.8 L (3,750 cc; 228.8 cu in)
- Cylinder bore: 70 mm (2.76 in); 72 mm (2.83 in); 75 mm (2.95 in); 78 mm (3.07 in); 80 mm (3.15 in); 82 mm (3.23 in); 85 mm (3.35 in); 86 mm (3.39 in); 88 mm (3.46 in); 93 mm (3.66 in)
- Piston stroke: 76 mm (2.99 in); 81.5 mm (3.21 in); 85 mm (3.35 in); 85.5 mm (3.37 in); 90 mm (3.54 in); 92 mm (3.62 in)
- Cylinder block material: Light alloy steel
- Cylinder head material: Aluminium alloy
- Valvetrain: OHV 2 valves x cyl.

Combustion
- Fuel system: Carburetor
- Fuel type: Petrol
- Cooling system: Water-cooled

Output
- Power output: 56–305 PS (41–224 kW; 55–301 bhp)

In 1950, Lancia introduced the world's first production 60° V6 engine in the Lancia Aurelia. The engine was the work of Francesco De Virgilio and was developed to solve the vibration problems Lancia had experienced with its V4 engines. This was achieved by setting the vee angle to 60 degrees. It remained in production through 1970. Lancia used V6 engines in road, sports cars, and sports racing cars.

== Aurelia ==
The first-generation Aurelia engines were produced from 1950 through 1967.

=== 1800 ===
The 1.8 L (1,754 cc; 107.0 cu in) 1800 was the first V6. Bore and stroke was 70 mm × 76 mm (2.76 in × 2.99 in). Maximum power is 56 PS (41 kW; 55 bhp) at 4,000 rpm, maximum torque 10.8 kg⋅m (106 N⋅m; 78 lb⋅ft) at 2,500-3,000 rpm.

- 1950 Lancia Aurelia

=== 2000 ===
The engine was expanded to 2.0 L (1,991 cc; 121.5 cu in) for 1951's B21 Aurelia. Bore and stroke was 72 mm × 81.5 mm (2.83 in × 3.21 in).

- 1951-1952 Lancia Aurelia

=== 2300 ===
A 2.3 L (2,266 cc; 138.3 cu in) version was also produced.

=== 2500 ===
The largest of the original Aurelia engines was the 2.5 L (2,451 cc; 149.6 cu in) 2500 introduced in 1953. It was still undersquare at 78 mm × 85.5 mm (3.07 in × 3.37 in) bore and stroke.

- 1953-1957 Lancia Aurelia

== Flaminia ==
The 2.8-litre tipo 826.100 engine in a Flaminia 3.C. GT

The engine's severe undersquare design was addressed for the 1957 Flaminia version. This lasted in production through 1970.

=== 2500 ===
The new engine, tipo 813 for the initial Berlinas and tipo 823 for other models, displaced 2.5 L (2,458 cc; 150.0 cu in) from a much less undersquare 80 mm × 81.5 mm (3.15 in × 3.21 in) bore and stroke.

- 1957-1970 Lancia Flaminia

=== 2800 ===
The final version was the 2.8 L (2,774 cc; 169.3 cu in) tipo 826 engine. Bore was now 85 mm (3.35 in) and stroke remained at 81.5 mm (3.21 in) as in the 2500.

- 1957-1970 Lancia Flaminia

== Application in motorsports ==
The Lancia D20 (7 produced) had a 60 degree quad cam V6 2962 cc 217 bhp (162 kW; 220 PS) engine and the D24 (6 produced) a 3300 cc V6 engine. For the 1953 edition of the 24 Hours of Le Mans, the 3-litre D20 was reduced to a 2.7-liter displacement, but with compressor and 240 bhp (179 kW; 243 PS). The largest version, with 3750 cc in the D25 Spider Competizione, produced 295–305 bhp (220–227 kW; 299–309 PS).

== Later V6-engined Lancias ==
Later Lancias were powered by V6 engines designed by other manufacturers, with

- the Ferrari Dino V6 powering the Stratos
- the PRV V6 powering early Themas
- the Alfa Romeo Busso V6 powering later versions of the Thema, and versions of the Kappa and Thesis
- the Chrysler Pentastar V6 in the badge-engineered 300C-based Thema, and in the Voyager.
