= Lancia Aurelia =

1950s-era car

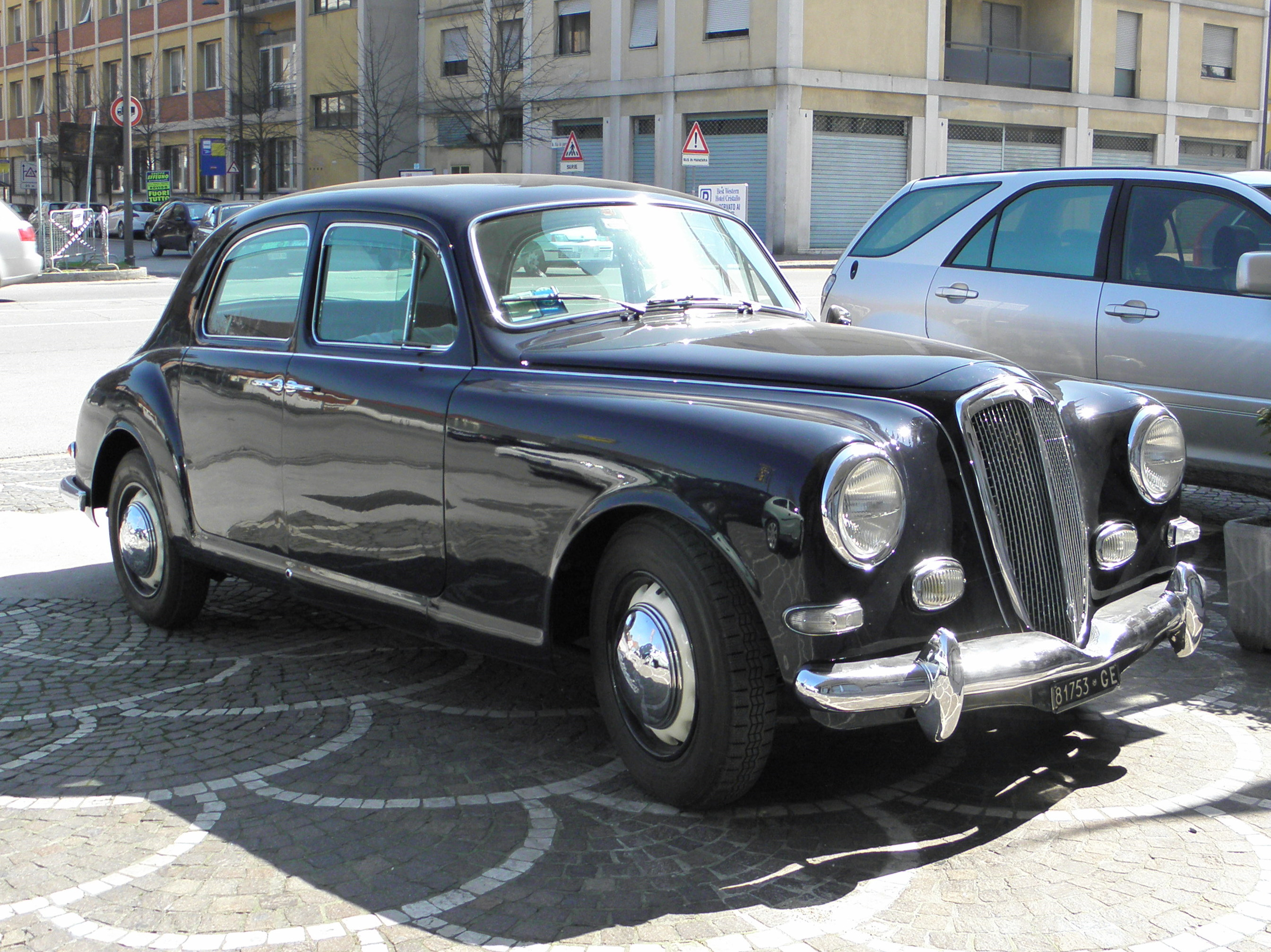
- Lancia Aurelia B12

Overview
- Manufacturer: Lancia
- Production: 1950–1958; 18,201 made
- Designer: Felice Mario Boano at Ghia (B20 coupé); Pinin Farina (B24 convertible)

Body and chassis
- Body style: 4-door saloon 2-door coupé 2-door spider 2-door convertible
- Layout: Front-engine, rear-wheel-drive

Powertrain
- Engine: 1.8 L tipo B10 V6; 2.0 L tipo B15/B20/B21/B22 V6; 2.3 L tipo B12 V6; 2.5 L tipo B20/B24 V6
- Transmission: 4-speed manual

Dimensions
- Kerb weight: 1,070–1,215 kg (2,359–2,679 lb)

Chronology
- Predecessor: Lancia Aprilia
- Successor: Lancia Flaminia

The Lancia Aurelia is a car manufactured and marketed by the Italian company, Lancia, from 1950 to the summer of 1958 — over a course of six series. Configurations included a 4-door saloon/sedan, 2-door cabriolet (B50/B52), 2-door GT coupé (B20), 2-door spider/convertible (B24), and as a rolling chassis for coachbuilders. The Aurelia is noted for using one of the first series-production V6 engines.

Establishing a post-war Lancia tradition, the car was named after a Roman road: the Via Aurelia, leading from Rome to Pisa.

== Specifications ==
The Aurelia was designed under the direction of engineer Vittorio Jano. Its engine, one of the first production V6 engines, a 60° design developed by Francesco de Virgilio, who was between 1943 and 1948 a Lancia engineer, and who worked under Jano. During production, capacity grew from 1.8 L to 2.5 L. Prototype engines used a bore and stroke of 68 mm x 72 mm for 1,569 cc; these were tested between 1946 and 1948. It was an all-alloy pushrod design with a single camshaft between the cylinder banks. A hemispherical combustion chamber and in-line valves were used. Carburation was by a single Solex or Weber. Some uprated 1,991 cc models were fitted with twin carburettors.

At the rear was an innovative combination transaxle integrating the gearbox, clutch, and differential, and inboard-mounted drum brakes. The front suspension was a sliding pillar design, with rear semi-trailing arms replaced by a de Dion tube in the Fourth series. The Aurelia was also the first car to be fitted with radial tires as standard equipment.

B21 engine technical specifications

Bore × stroke: 72.0 mm × 81.5 mm (2.83 in × 3.21 in)
Displacement: 1991 cc
Dry weight: 150 kg
Firing order: 1L-4R-3L-6R-5L-2R
Carburetors: Solex 30 AAI, 23 and 24 mm venturis
Power: 75 PS gross (55 kW) at 4,500 rpm

== History ==
=== First series ===
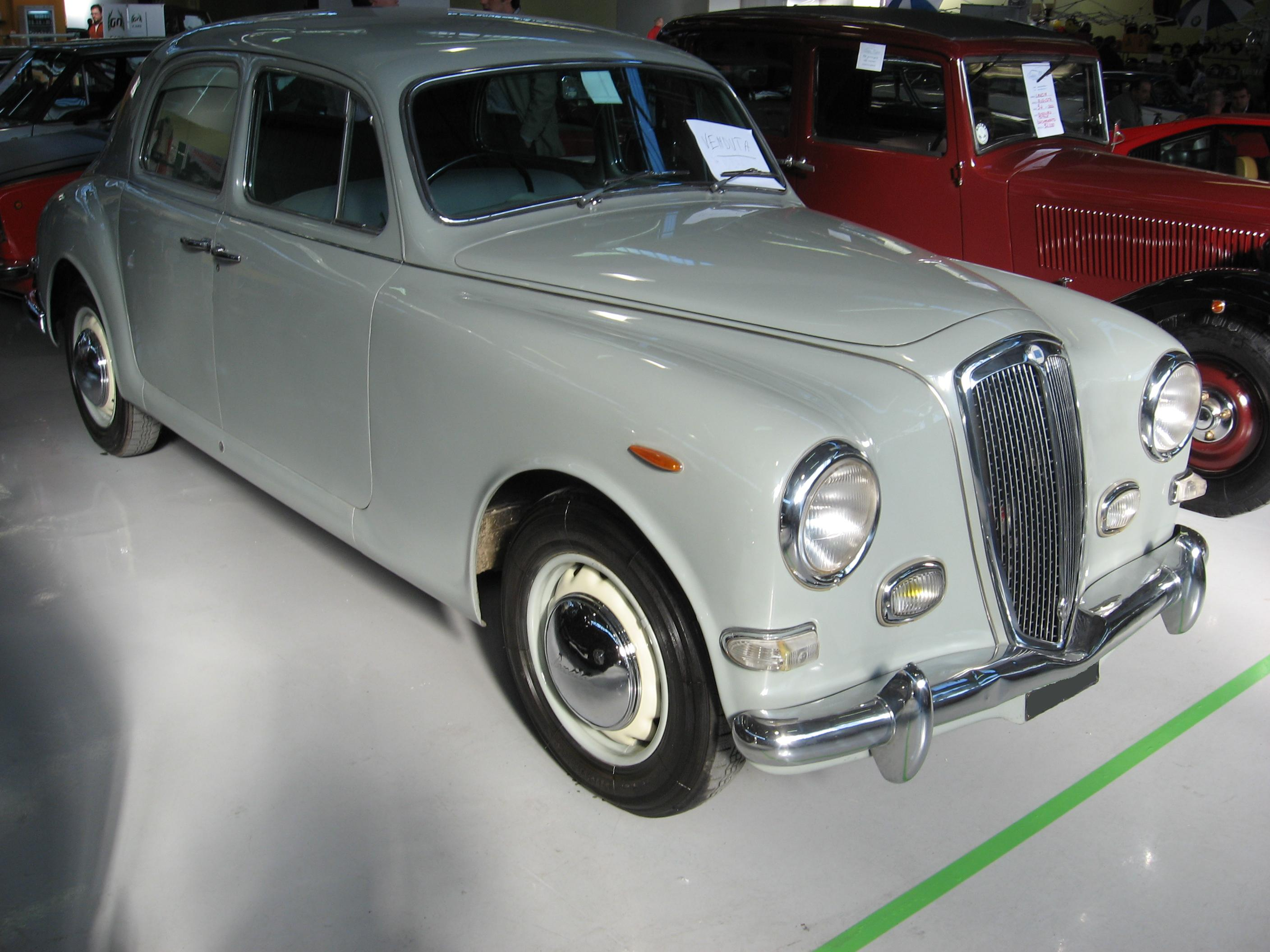
Lancia Aurelia B12 Sedan Berlina 1954–55

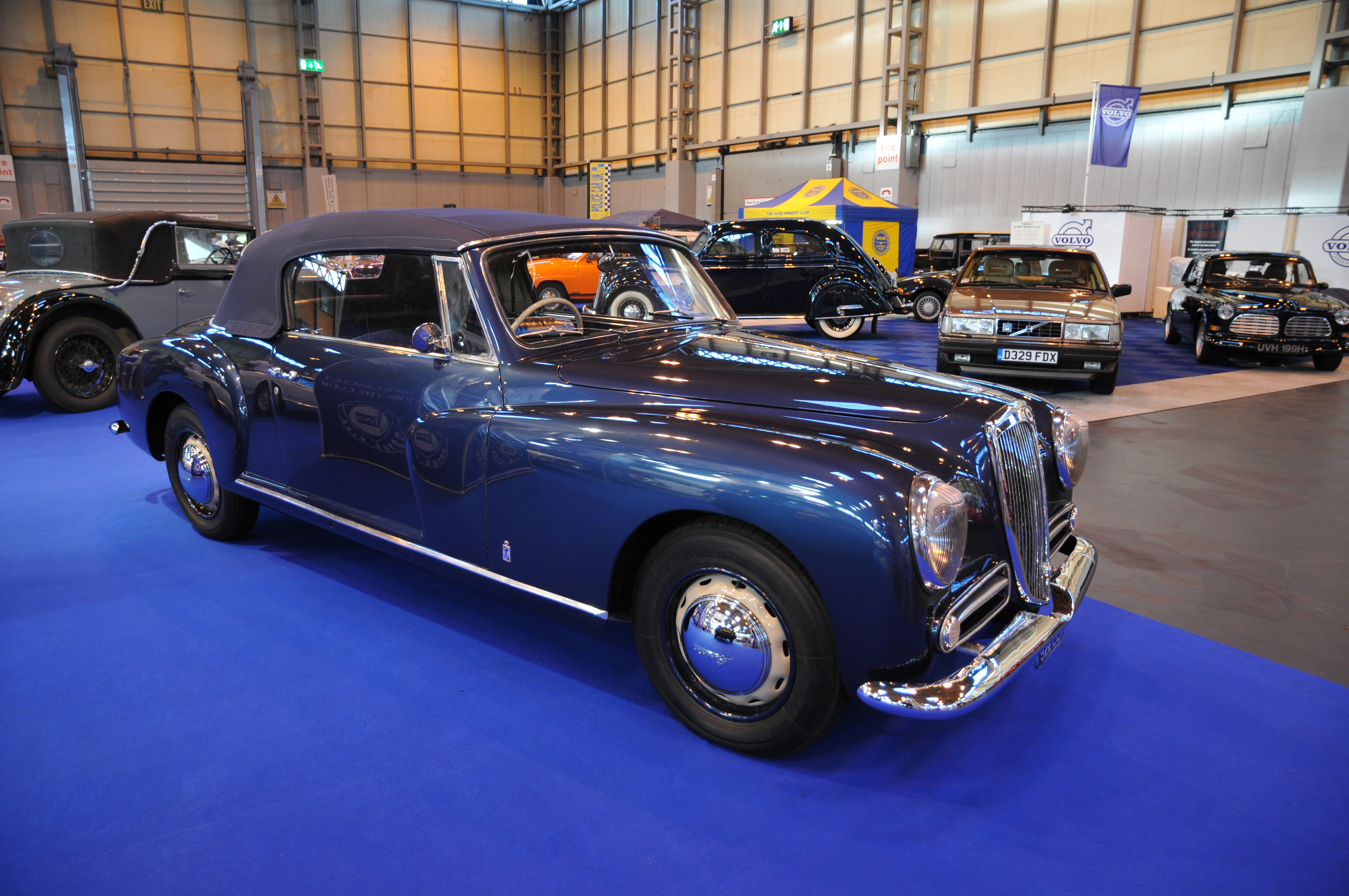
Lancia Aurelia B50 cabriolet by Pinin Farina

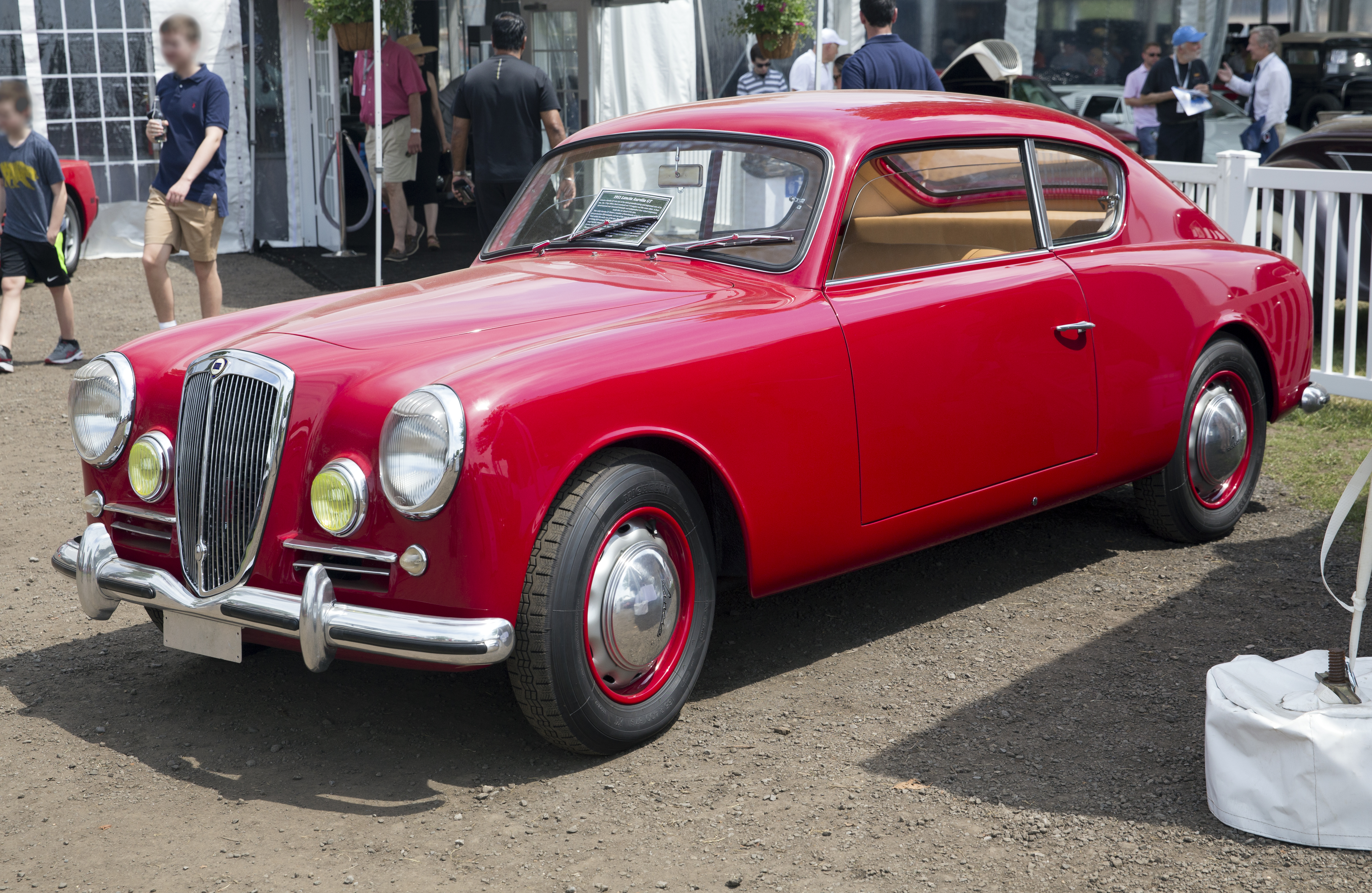
Lancia Aurelia B20 GT 1951 (First Series)

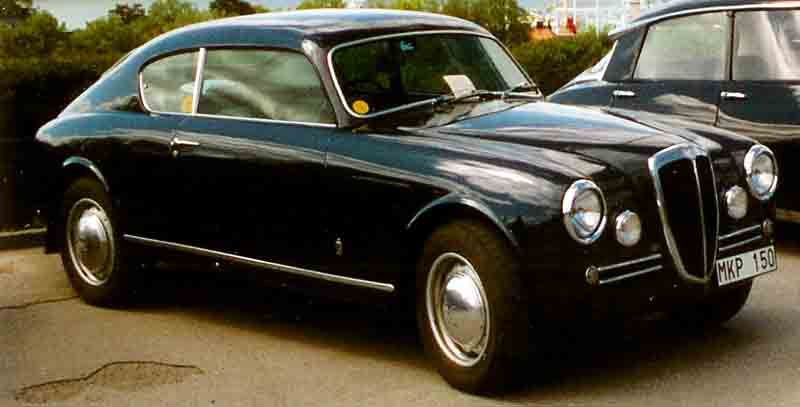
Lancia Aurelia B20 GT 1955

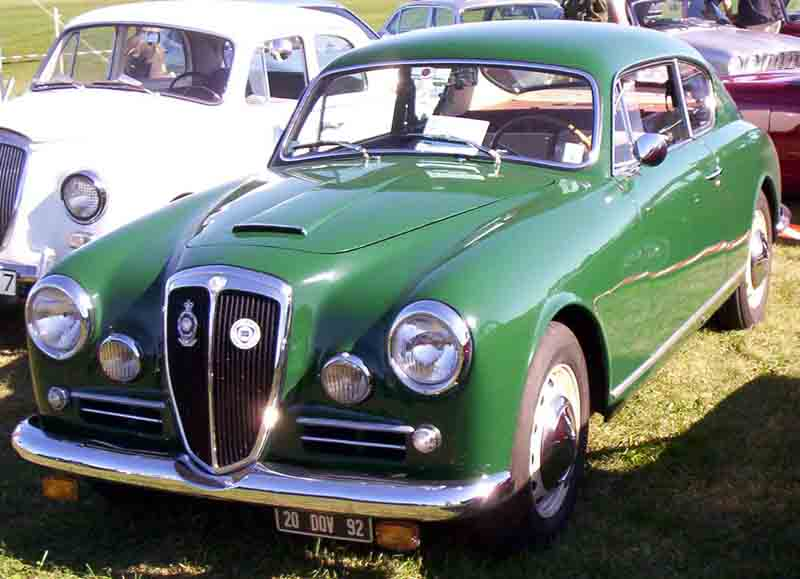
Lancia Aurelia B20 GT 1957

The very first Aurelias were the B10 berlinas (sedans). They used a 1754 cc version of the V6 which produced 56 hp (42 kW). The B21 was released in 1951 with a larger 1991 cc 70 hp (52 kW) engine. A two-door B20 GT coupé appeared that same year. It had a shorter wheelbase and a Ghia-designed, Pinin Farina-built body. The same 1991 cc engine produced 75 hp (56 kW) in the B20. In all, 500 first series Aurelias were produced.

=== Second series ===
The second series Aurelia coupé pushed power up to 80 hp (60 kW) from the 1991 cc V6 with a higher compression ratio and repositioned valves. Other changes included better brakes and minor styling tweaks, such as chromed bumpers instead of the aluminium ones used in the earlier car. A new dashboard featured two larger instrument gauges. The suspension was unchanged from the first series. A new B22 sedan was released in 1952 with dual Weber carburetors and a hotter camshaft for 90 hp (67 kW).

=== Third series ===
The third series appeared in 1953 with a larger 2451 cc version of the engine. The rear of the car lost the tail fins of the earlier series.

=== Fourth series ===
The fourth series introduced the new de Dion tube rear suspension. The engine was changed from white metal bearings to shell bearings. An open car, the B24 Spider, was introduced at this time (1954 to 1955) and was well received. It was similar to the B20 coupé mechanically, with an eight-inch (203 mm) shorter wheelbase than the coupé.

The fourth-series cars were the first B20 Aurelias to be available in left-hand drive. C. 12% of Series 1 Saloon (Berlina) production - B10, B21, B22 - were left-hand drive. Fourth-series Aurelias were the first to be imported to the US in any number.

=== Fifth series ===
The fifth series coupé, appearing in 1956, was more luxurious. It had a different transaxle (split case), which was more robust and similar to that used in the later Flaminias. The driveshaft was also revised to reduce vibration.

Alongside the fifth series coupés was a revised open car, the B24 convertible. This differed from the earlier B24 Spider, having roll-up windows, a better seating position, and a windscreen with vent windows. Mechanically, the B24 convertible was similar to the coupé of the same series.

This model was immortalized by Dino Risi's 1962 movie Il Sorpasso ("The Easy Life"), starring Vittorio Gassman.

=== Sixth series ===
Power was down to 112 hp (84 kW) for the 1957 sixth series, with increased torque to offset the greater weight of the later car. The sixth-series coupés had vent windows, and typically a chrome strip down the bonnet. They were the most touring-oriented of the B20 series.

The sixth-series B24 convertible was very similar to the fifth, with some minor differences in trim. Most notably, the fuel tank was in the boot, not behind the seats as it was in the fourth- and fifth-series open cars. This change, however, did not apply for the first 150 sixth-series cars, which were like the fifth series. The sixth-series convertibles also had different seats than either earlier car.

== Models ==
=== Lancia Aurelia Cabriolet (B50/B52) ===
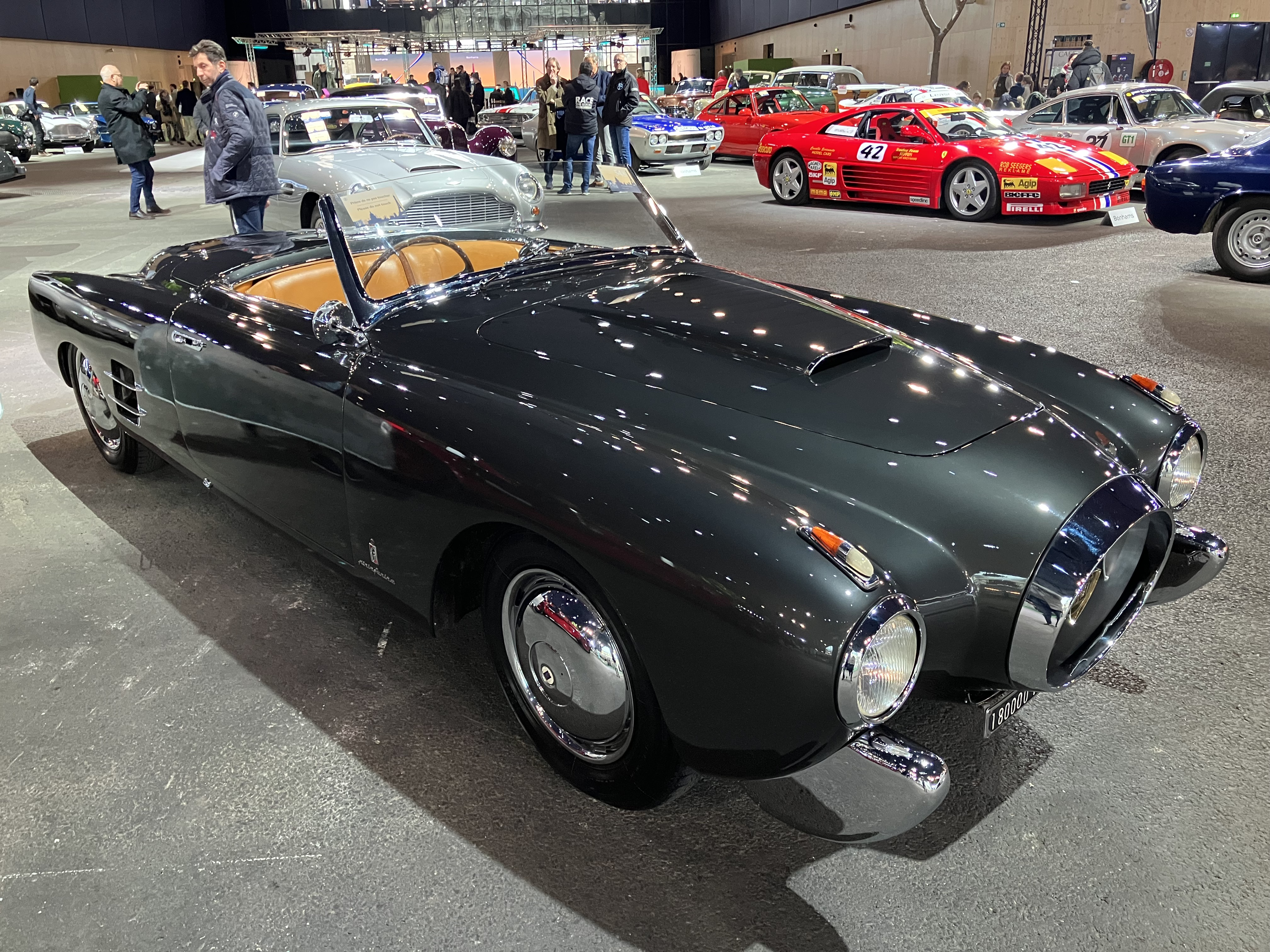

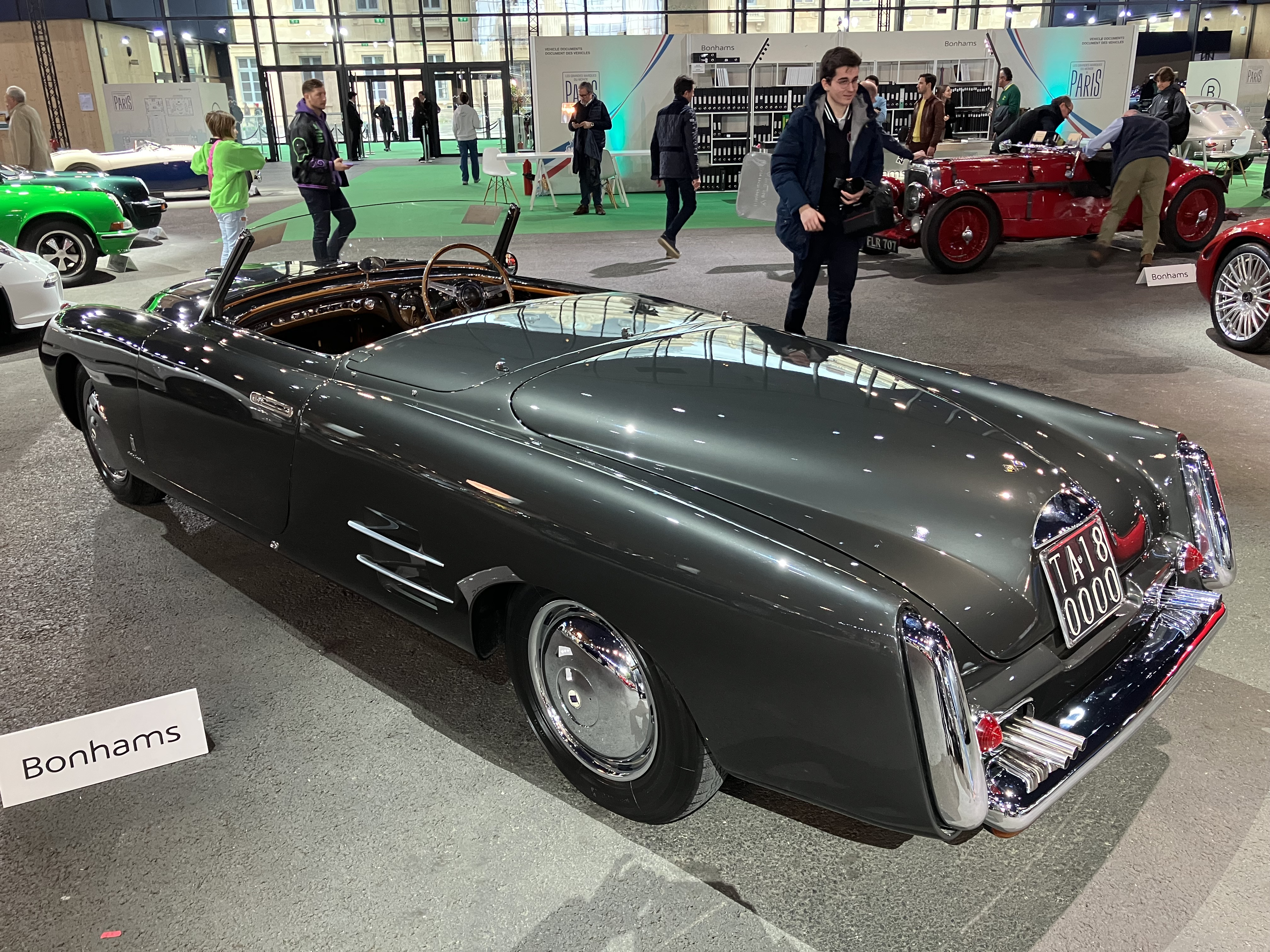
1952 Lancia Aurelia PF200 Spider

The first prototype of the B50 cabriolet was shown at the 1950 Turin Auto Show. Produced in a small number, around 265, by cabriolet-specialist Pinin Farina, it was a four-seat comfortable cruiser, powered by a 1,754cc engine. Most were produced between 1950 and 1952. Some had an improved B52 platform which came with the 2.0-litre engine of the B20/B21. In total Lancia built only 98 B52 chassis, the last delivered in 1953.

==== Lancia Aurelia PF200 Spider ====
The PF200 was a concept car that debuted on the Pinin Farina (as it was then) stand at the 1952 Turin Motor Show. The show car was built for promotional purposes to generate publicity and never intended for series production, although Pinin Farina went on to build a further six examples, some open, some closed. The seven PF200s were slightly different from one another, although all featured the signature circular front air intake reminiscent of the North American F-86 Sabre jet fighter. The cars had side air intakes and six exhaust pipes, while instead of stowing the soft-top behind the seats, like many open cars of the period, Pinin Farina arranged for the PF200's hood to fold down out of sight within the body. The PF200 used the chassis and running gear of the Lancia Aurelia B52.

=== Lancia Aurelia Spider (B24) ===
Produced only in 1954–1955, 240 examples of the B24 Aurelia Spider were built. They had a panoramic front windscreen, distinctive two-part chrome bumpers, removable side screens, soft top and Pinin Farina styling. 181 LHD cars had B24S ('sinistra') designation; the remaining 59 cars were right-hand drive. All were equipped with 2451 cc V6 engines. Built on a 2,450 mm (8 ft) wheelbase, the B24S Spider was mechanically similar to the 4th Series Aurelia B20, except for different air filters. All models had a floor-mounted gear-change. The dashboard had one prominent and two small dials.

In 2014, RM Auctions sold a "barn find" 1955 Aurelia Spider at auction for £500,000 ($805,154 USD). In 2014, Gooding and Company Auctions sold a restored 1955 Aurelia Spider for $1,815,000. In 2023, an unrestored Lancia Aurelia B24 Spider America 1955 sold for €540.000 at auction as a barn find.

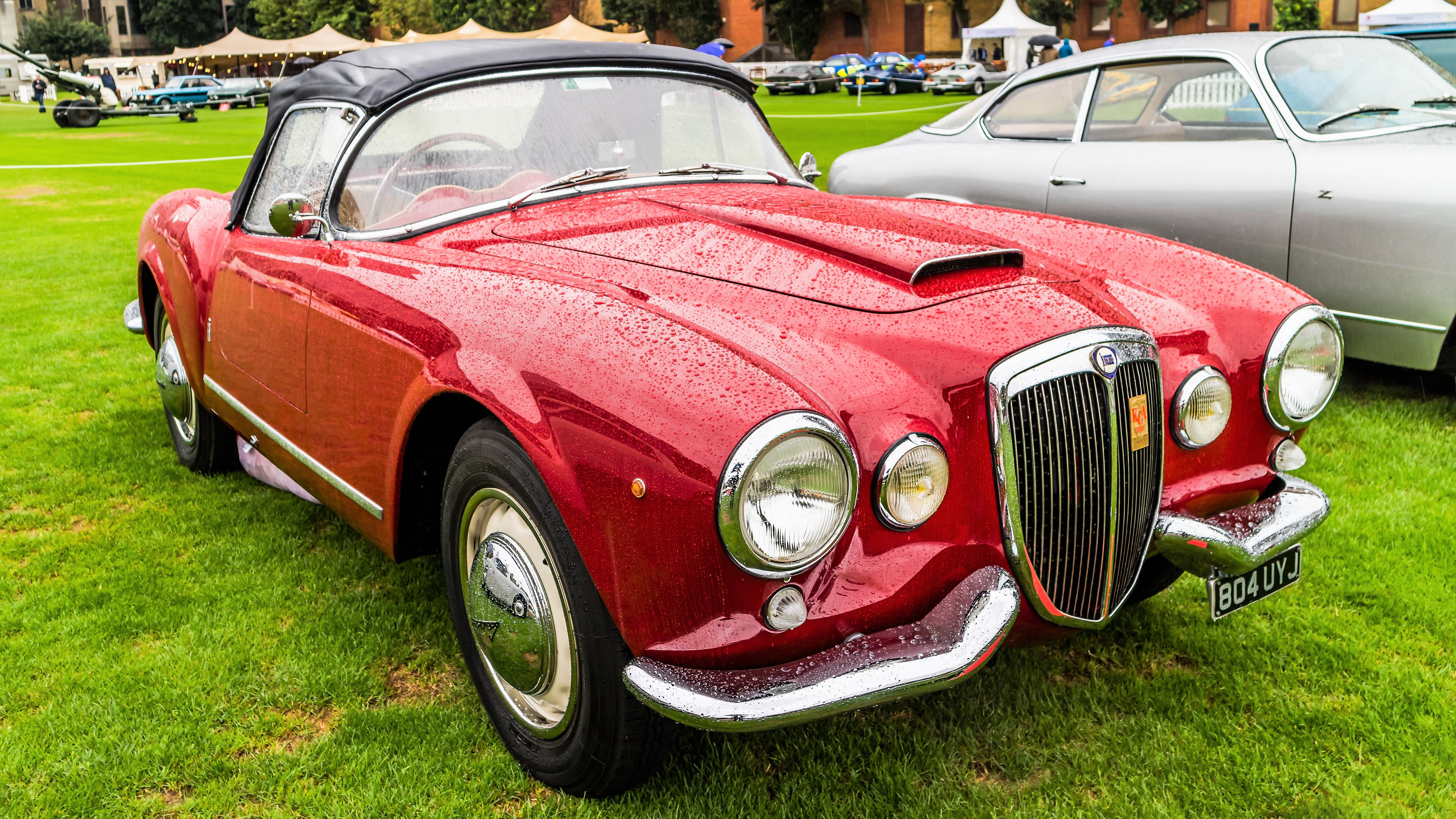
1955 Aurelia B24 Spider

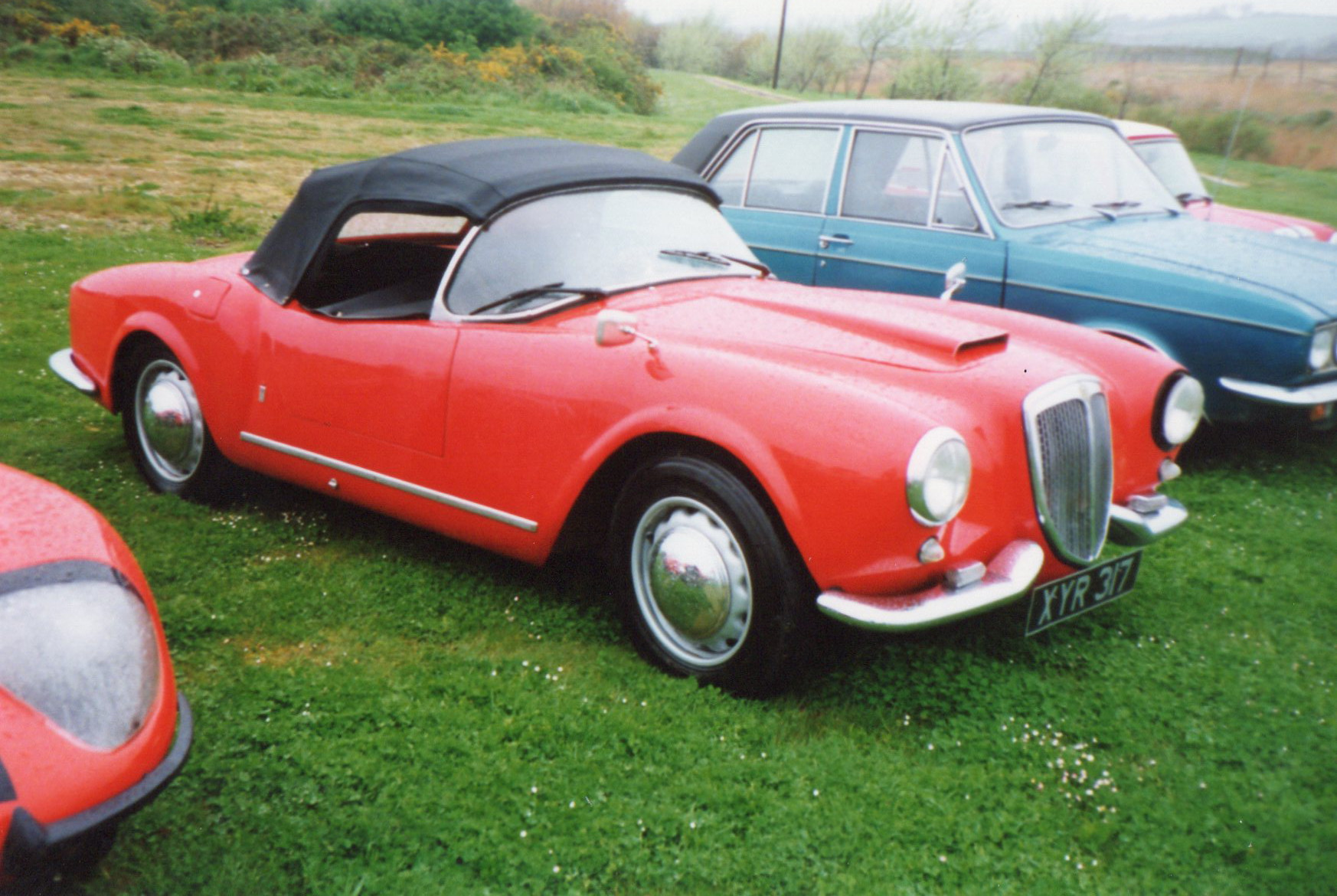

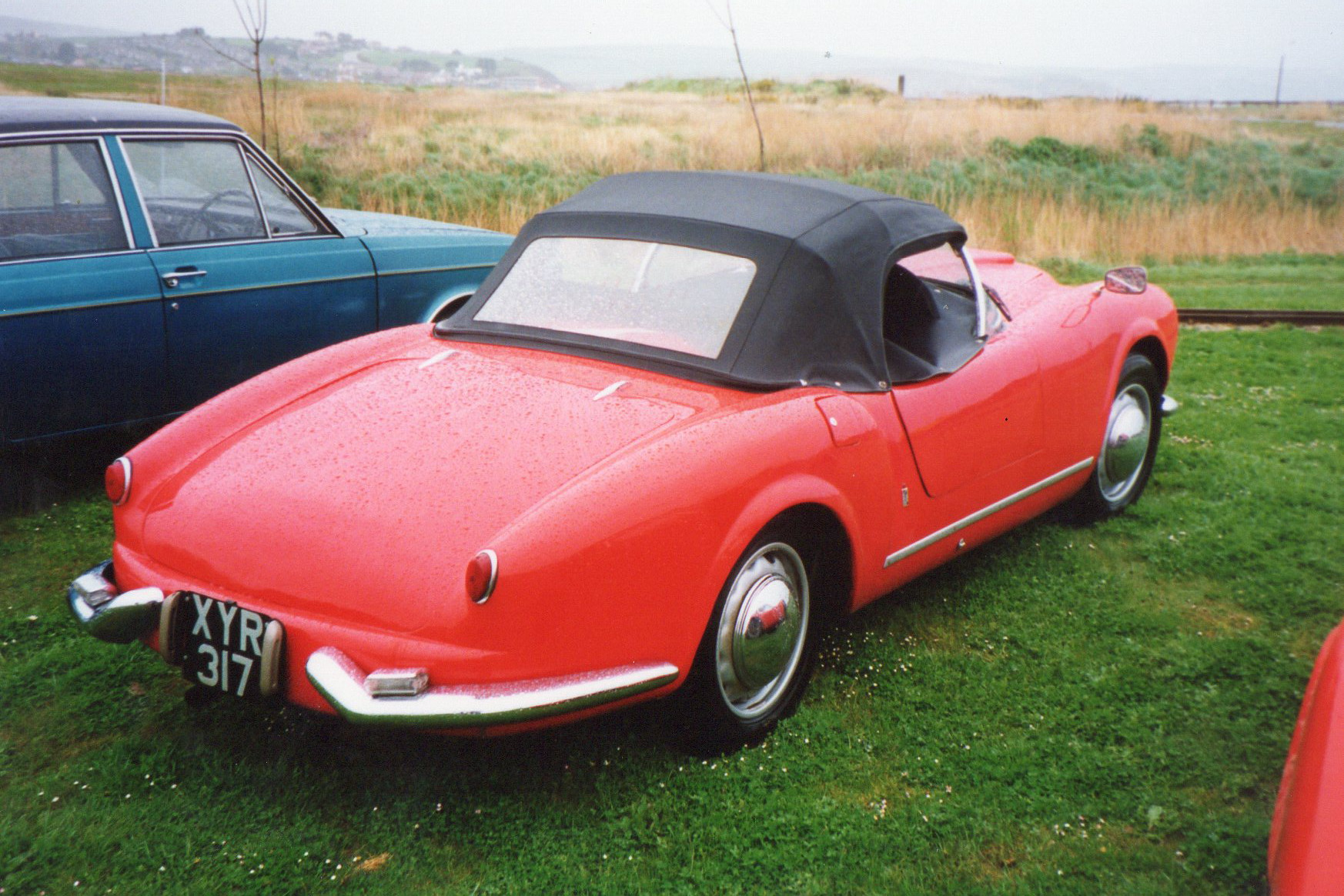

=== Lancia Aurelia Convertible (B24) ===
Produced from 1956 to 1958, this second series featured many small alterations compared to the Aurelia Spider. It was mechanically based on the 5th series Aurelia B20. Cars from this series have a flatter windscreen with quarter-lights, deeper doors with external handles and wind-up windows. It also had one part chrome bumpers and a wider bonnet air-scoop. It had a proper convertible hood and a hardtop was available. 521 cars were built. The B24S Convertible was built on the same wheelbase as the Spider and used a slightly less powerful, 112 PS (82 kW; 110 hp) 2,451 cc V6 engine. The dashboard features two large dials.

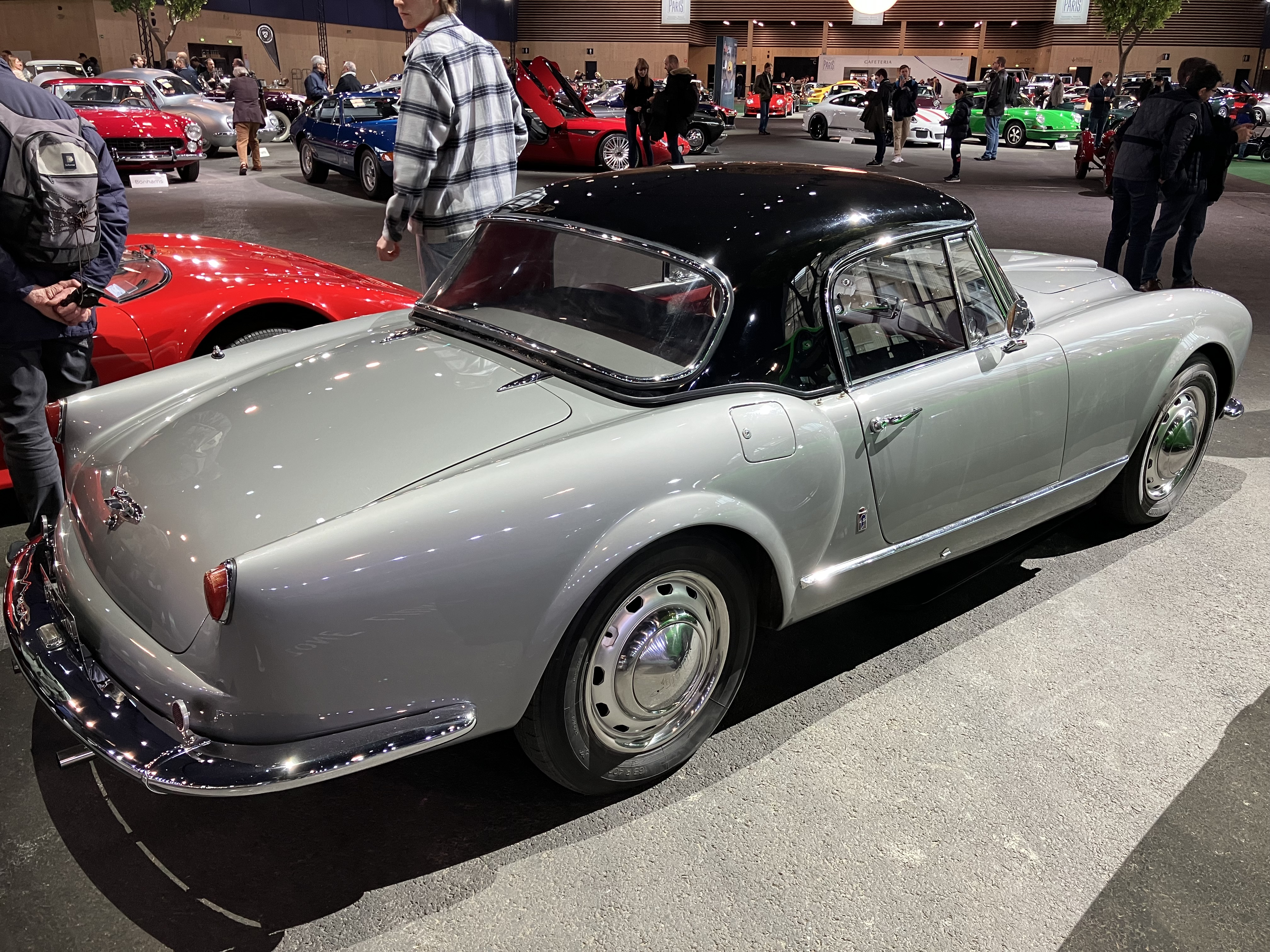
1956 B24S Convertible with hardtop

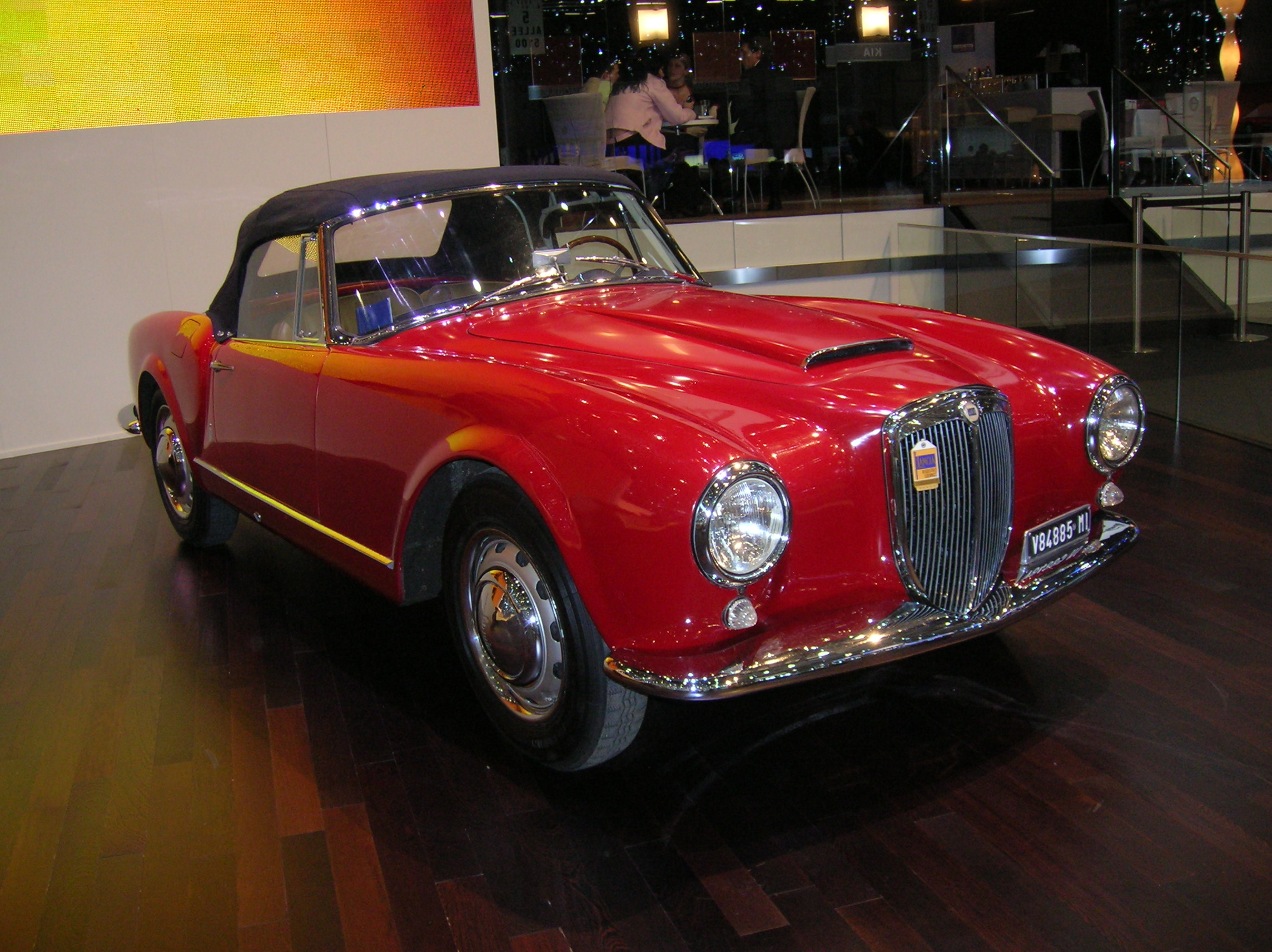
1958 Aurelia B24 Convertible

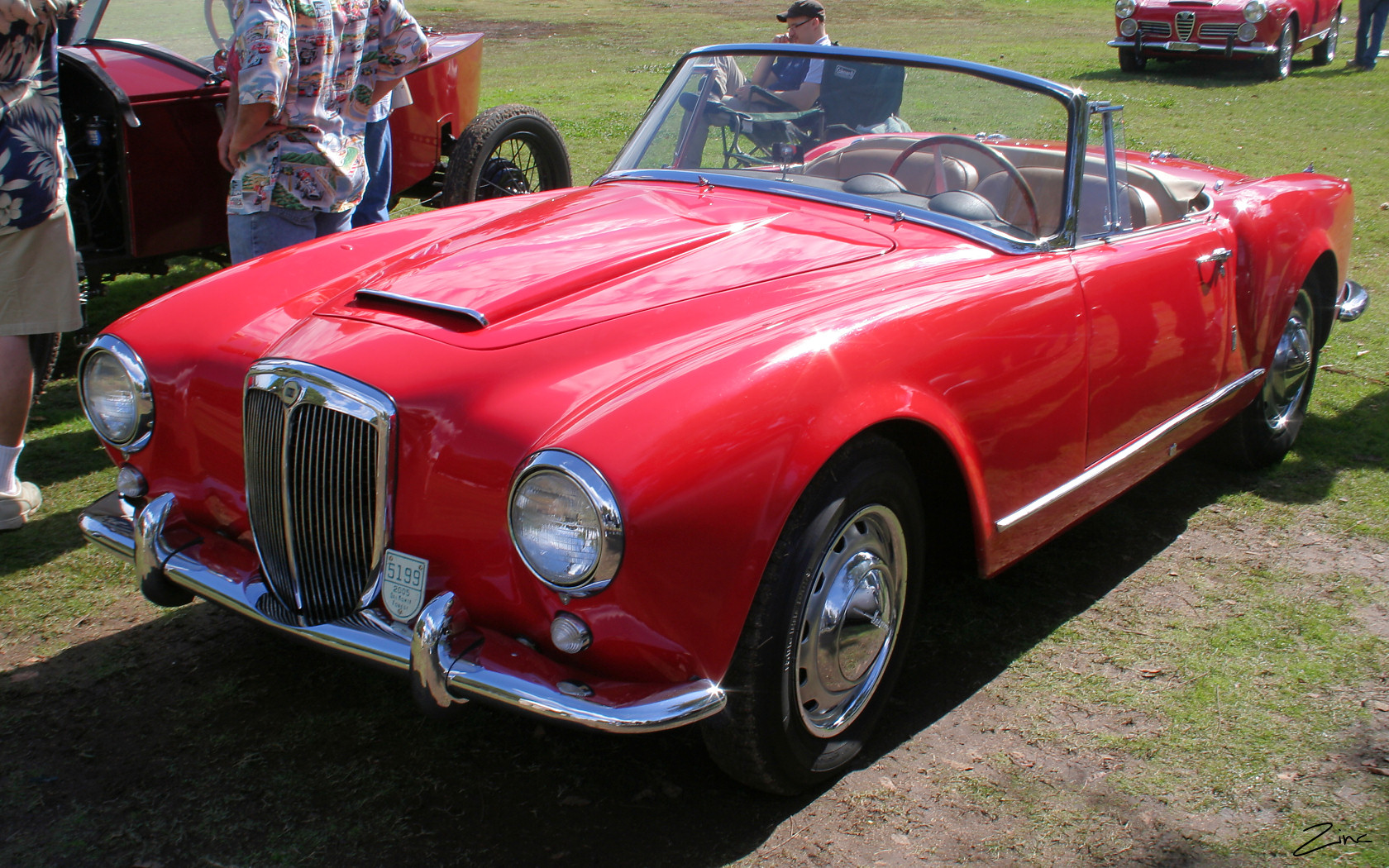
1957 Aurelia B24 Convertible

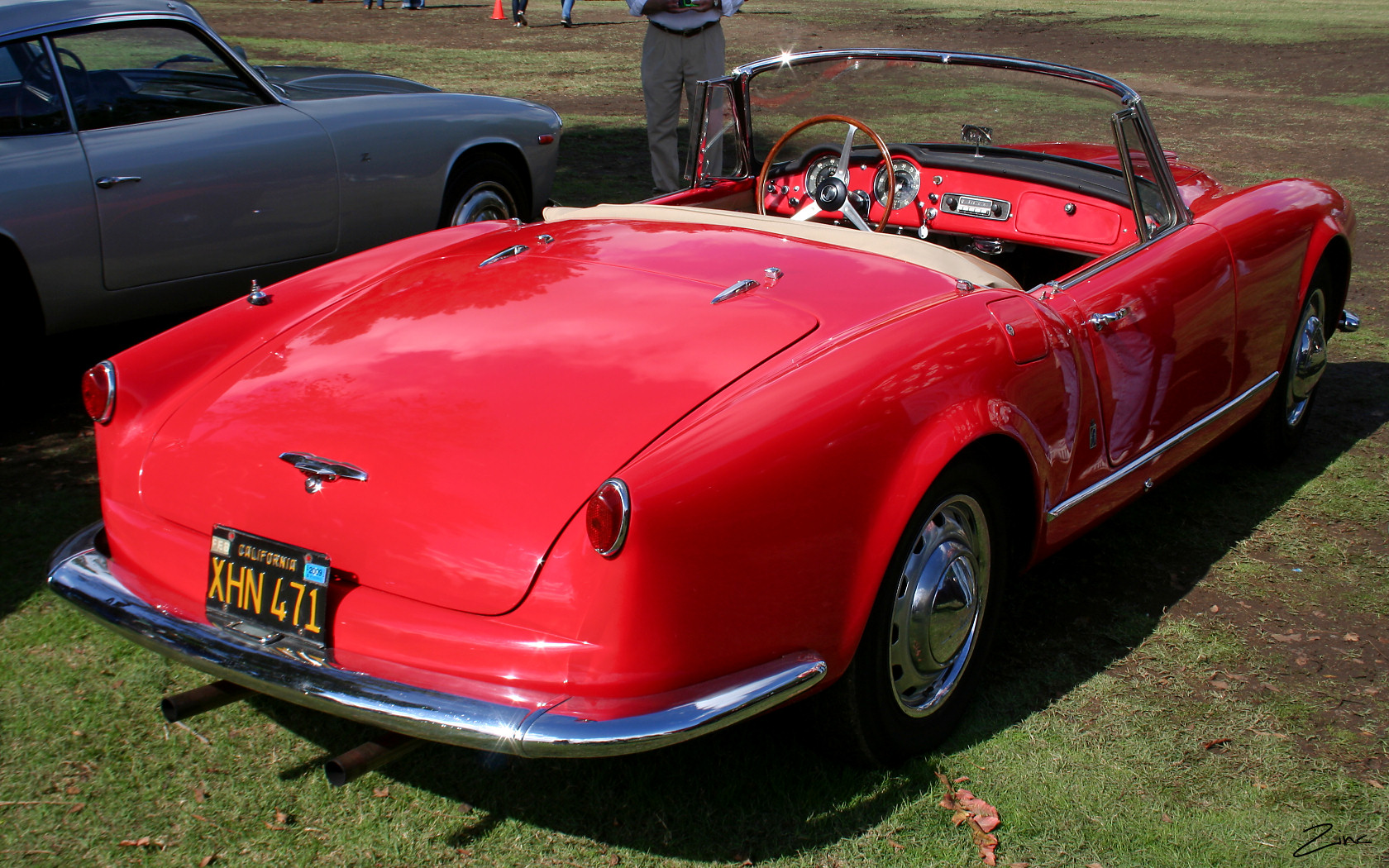
1957 Aurelia B24 Convertible

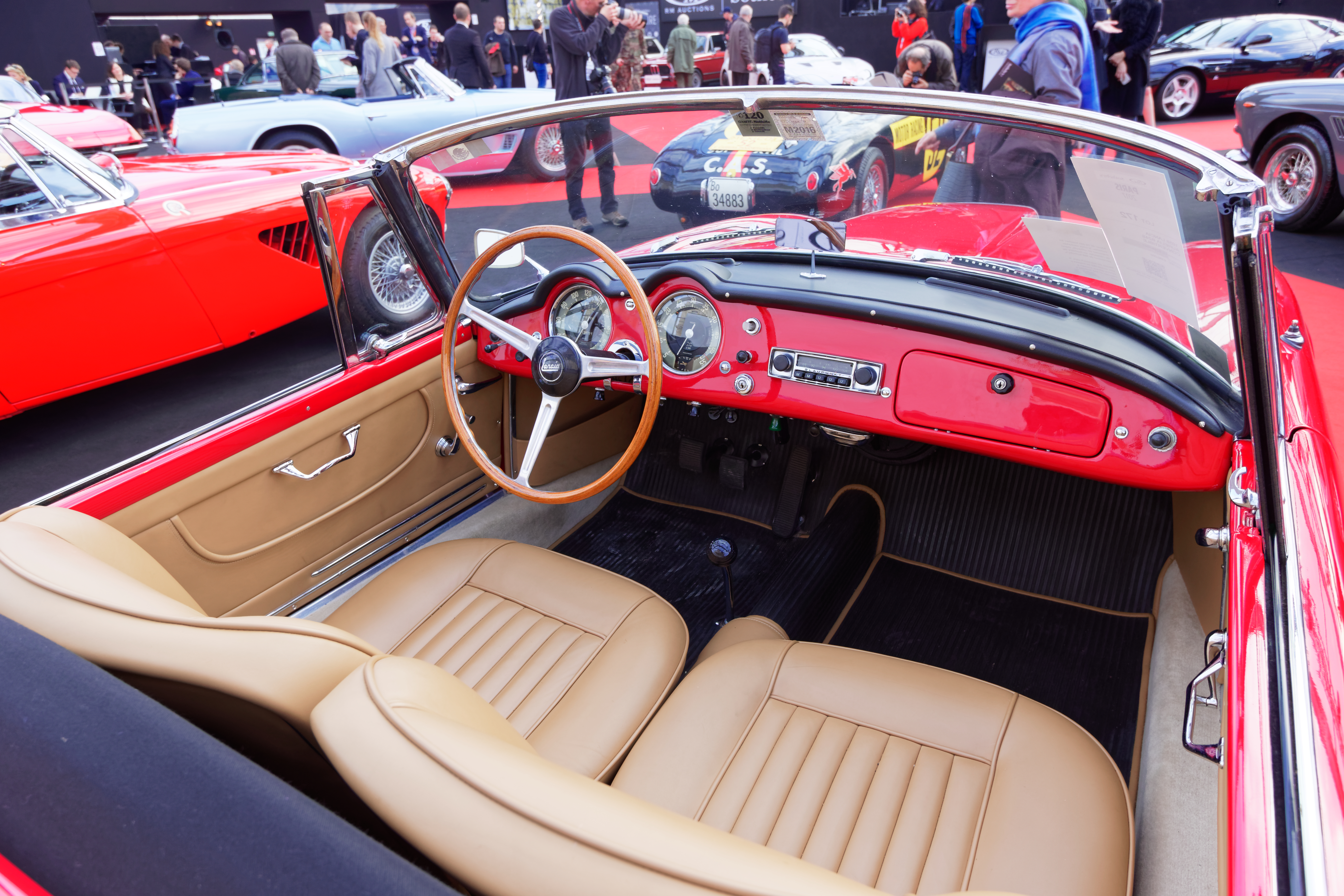
1958 Aurelia B24 Convertible interior

== Motorsport ==
In the 1951 Mille Miglia, a 2-litre Aurelia, driven by Giovanni Bracco and Umberto Maglioli, finished second, beaten only by a Ferrari 340 America. The same year it took first in class and 12th overall at the 24 Hours of Le Mans. Modified Aurelias took the first three places in the 1952 Targa Florio with Felice Bonetto as the winner and another win on Liège-Rome-Liège of 1953. The fifth edition of the Coppa della Toscana netted 1-2-3 victory for the Lancia Aurelia GT 2500 of Scuderia Lancia.

One of the most important wins came in 1954 at the Monte Carlo Rally. An Aurelia GT co-driven by Louis Chiron and Ciro Basadonna won, the first of Lancia's many overall victories at the rally held on the roads above the principality.

== Production numbers ==
Lancia Aurelia production data
Body	Berlina					Coupé		Spider and convertible	Chassis						Total
Type	B10	B21	B15	B22	B12	B20 2.0 L	B20 2.5 L	B24	B50	B51	B52	B53	B55/56	B60	Total
1950	954	—	—	—	—	—	—	—	291	51	—	—	—	—	1,296
1951	2,994	1,118	—	—	—	371	—	—	193	47	—	—	—	—	4,723
1952	1,326	2,123	61	294	—	736	—	—	1	1	86	86	—	—	4,714
1953	177	539	20	780	—	124	720	—	—	—	12	—	—	1	2,373
1954	—	—	—	—	995	—	573	1^{[α]}	—	—	—	—	—	—	1,569^{[α]}
1955	—	—	—	—	1,372	—	426	239	—	—	—	—	10	—	2,047
1956	—	—	—	—	33	—	189	150	—	—	—	—	4	—	376
1957	—	—	—	—	—	—	420	176	—	—	—	—	—	—	596
1958	—	—	—	—	—	—	312	195	—	—	—	—	—	—	507
Total	5,451	3,780	81	1,074	2,400	1,231	2,640	761^{[α]}	485	99	98	86	14	1	18,201^{[α]}

Notes

- ^{α} not including one pre-production B24 prototype constructed in 1954

== In popular culture ==
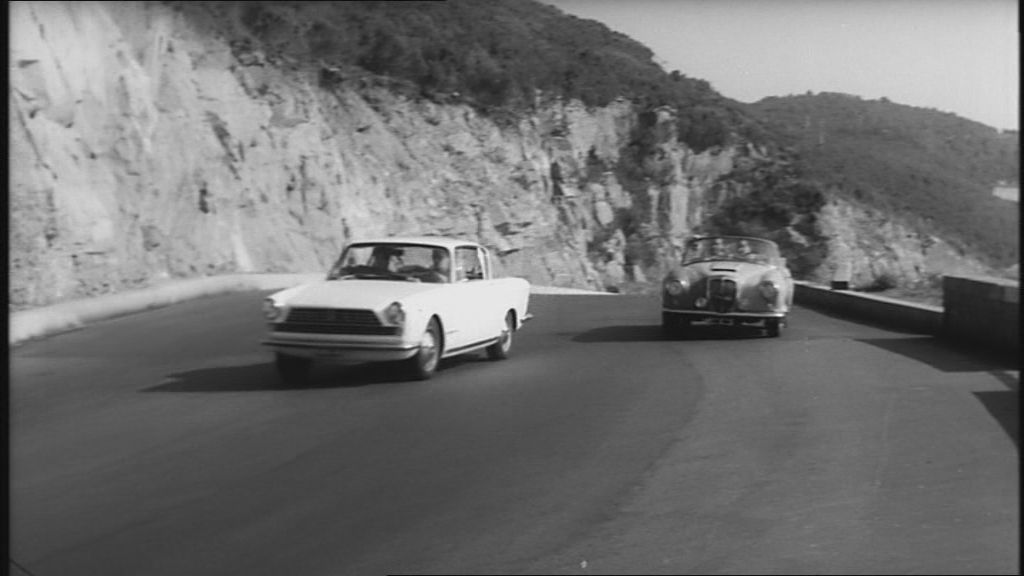
Scene from Il Sorpasso (1962)

The Lancia Aurelia is prominent in The Calculus Affair, one of The Adventures of Tintin, in the story's car chase scene. The car's Italian driver has great pride in Italian cars, which he claims are the best in the world.

Dino Risi's 1962 movie The Easy Life (Il Sorpasso, starring Vittorio Gassmann and Jean-Louis Trintignant, a fine example of the Commedia all'italiana genre) features the Lancia Aurelia. It was unusual then for almost all filming to be done within a car, and The Easy Life can be considered one of the first road movies. The Lancia Aurelia used was a 1958 B24 Convertible and the driving scenes were, very unusually, filmed on the road rather than with a projected backdrop.
