= Ilario Bandini =

Racecar driver and designer and businessperson (1911–1992)

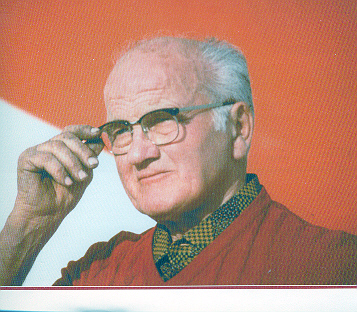
- Eng. Ilario Bandini (Imola circuit, 1988)
- Born: 18 April 1911; Villa Rovere, Forlì, Italy
- Died: 12 April 1992 (aged 80); Forlì, Italy
- Occupation: Car builder

Ilario Bandini (18 April 1911 – 12 April 1992) was an Italian businessman, racing driver, and racing car manufacturer.

== Early years ==
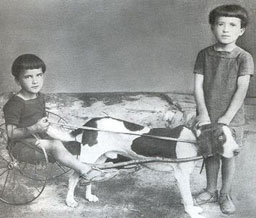
Ilario and his brother Gualtiero (Walter) with their first wheeled vehicle.

Bandini was born in Villa Rovere, today part of the administrative region of Forlì in Romagna. After finishing elementary school, he apprenticed as a mechanic and turner in Forli. At the age of 25, he moved to Eritrea, then an Italian colony, where he operated a transport business between Dekemhare and Asmara. He returned to Italy in 1939 and, with his savings, opened a garage and car rental/limousine service in downtown Forlì.

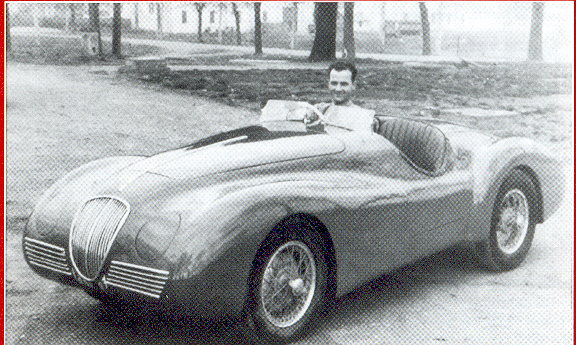
The first Bandini

In the same year, Bandini started competing as a motorcycle racer, racing at Faenza, Lugo di Romagna, and Imola. In 1940, he took part in the Mille Miglia, driving a Fiat Balilla "Coppa d'oro". During World War II, faced with shortages of fuel for civilian use, Bandini adapted his automobile engines to operate with wood gas. In 1946, he reassembled a Fiat 1100 that he had cut apart and hidden to avoid its requisition by the German army. He modified the chassis and suspension while rebuilding the car. Fitted with an aluminium body, the work of Turin coachbuilder Rocco Motto, this car became the Bandini 1100, the first to carry the Bandini name.

== 1940s racing career in Italy ==
In 1947, Bandini raced a Cisitalia D46 at the Asti circuit, and raced his 1100 Sport at the Predappio-Rocca delle Camminate race, coming second in his class.

After constructing a second example, Bandini entered the 1949 Mille Miglia with his new 1100 siluro, featuring torpedo-like bodywork and cycle fenders (separate mudguards). The car still used the same Fiat engine, modified with a twin overhead camshaft cylinder head based on an Alfa Romeo design. With this car, Bandini entered events at Senigallia, Ferrara, Modena, Bari, and Pescara. His first victory was a class win in the Tour of Umbria (Giro dell'Umbria).

At the start of the 1950s, Bandini became a dealer in Italy for Alfa Romeo and then for Lancia. Meanwhile, the first Bandini arrived in United States. Here, in the hands of drivers Dick Gent and Bob Said, the car gained early racing successes; its lightness and stability, using a patented elliptical-section steel tube space frame, were particularly appreciated.

== 1950s racing opportunities in the United States ==
American importer Tony Pompeo thought this space frame chassis, already winning in 1100 and 1500 cc classes with Fiat and Siata engines, could be even more competitive in the 750 cc category, equipped with Crosley powerplants. With this in mind, Bandini made changes to the engine lubrication system, distributor, and valvetrain, also marginally increasing the stroke, enlarging the capacity from 721 cc to 747 cc. He designed space frames weighing only 18 kg (40 lb), to which he fitted bodies by Rocco Motto. This became the Bandini 750 sport siluro. These cars, when their headlights were removed, qualified to race in the sports category: they could also be adapted to qualify for the racing category simply by removing their cycle fenders (separate mudguards).

With exports increasing, Bandini earned respect and success in races outside Italy, also gaining coverage in the specialist press. Two Bandinis were shown at Chicago in 1952, with a 750 sports torpedo displayed at the 1953 New York Auto Show at Madison Square Garden. Despite his commitments, Bandini continued to race, competing at Chieti, Senigallia, and Bari, as well as piloting the 750 to it first victory, the Bologna-Raticosa Hillclimb, in 1952. Meanwhile, Chuck Hassan and Beau Clarke shared a 750 in 1953's 12 Hours of Sebring (the first World Sports Car Championship event), after coming in third in the Six Hours of Vero Beach, first at Sowega (Georgia), and (despite lost time due to a puncture) second at Bryanfan.

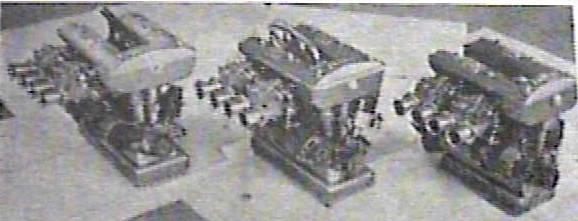
The first series of DOHC engines.

== Engineering developments ==
The cars were designed in the corner of a garage and built by his brother Aurelio with a small team, but Bandini oversaw every aspect, from design to assembly to testing. From 1953, the bodywork was produced in-house, A new gear-driven DOHC head was fitted to the Crosley-sourced engine and a single Weber carburetor replaced the Dell'Orto. Rods, pistons, crankshaft, and sump were all replaced; all that remained of the original Crosley engine was the aluminium block.

== 1950s racing in Italy ==
In 1953, the Bandini was adapted for new Italian racing regulations, which required fenders (mudguards) to be integrated into the body shell. Entered in the Mille Miglia, the 750 proved the World Sportscar Championship result at Sebring had been no fluke, but failed to finish in Forlì. Nevertheless, it was consistently placed in the top three at Salerno, Ascoli Piceno, Teramo, Macerata, Senigallia, Montenero Circuit, and the Consuma (Bologna) hillclimb.

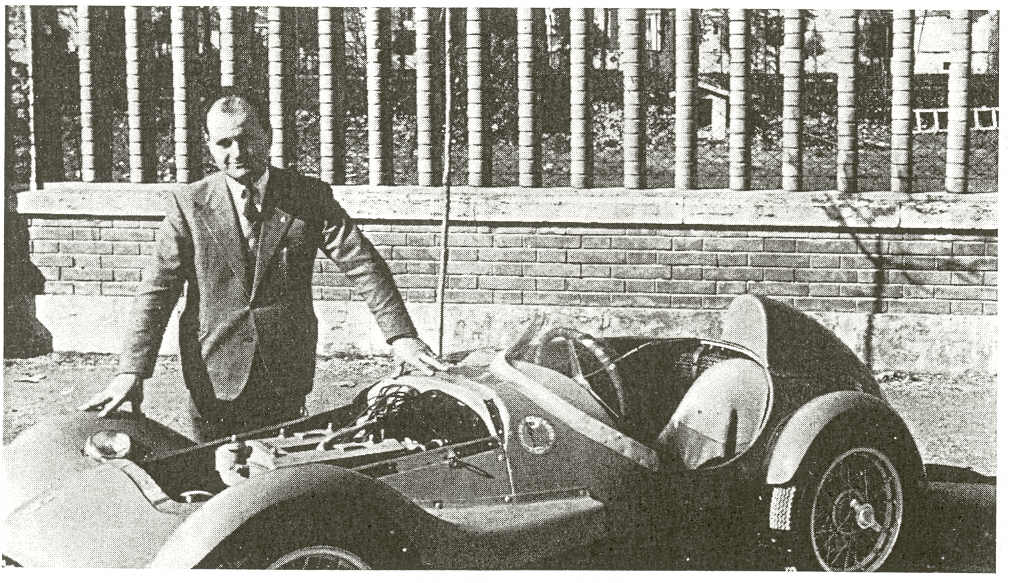
Bandini with a 750 sport torpedo.

At the Mille Miglia, Massimo Bondi, driving a Bandini 750, finished ninth in his class, out of a field of 69 entrants. A further 13 entries by other driver teams were made by 1957 (including Zanini-Vitali, Tinazzo-Sintoni, Fouls-Pacitti, Camisotti-Sintoni and Garavini). In 1955, two years before the final 'true' Mille Miglia, the Bandini 750 shared by Rusconi and Sintoni had to retire after a refuelling fire at Florence, but not before having reached Rome in 7 hours 35 minutes 30 seconds, which was more than an hour quicker than two years earlier.

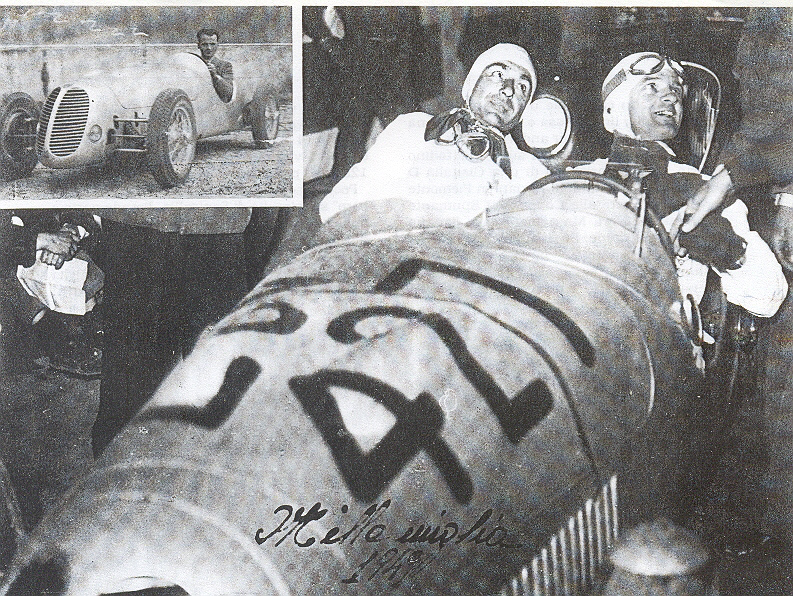
Ilario Bandini in his 1100 with Cantelli at the start of the 1949 Mille Miglia.

In 1954, production of the two-seat sport torpedo continued alongside the new single seater Formula 3 car, for which 93 hp (69 kW) at 9,000 rpm was claimed. A lowered centre of gravity was achieved by combining the gear box with the differential in a combined unit mounted across the rear axle. In 1957, following the success of Jaguar's C- and D-types at Le Mans from in 1951, the brakes were upgraded to discs on all four wheels. This car came in second at the championship race at Forlì. Bandini also entered a two-seater at the same circuit in the sports category, but the car was forced to retire while lying third. He nevertheless won the Consuma 'climb, and placed third at the Compiano Vetto d'Enza. Bandini then combined his racing activities, vehicle development and production and dealership and service centre business into the "Gruppo sportivo Bandini" (Bandini Sports Group).

== Mid-1950s racing in the United States ==
In America, meanwhile, in the SCCA championship, James Riley, Jim Pauley (famous for his comeback from 24th to 3rd place at Bridgehampton in 1951), Sheldon Morril and Henry Rudkin (four first and three second places in seven races, putting him second in H Modified in 1954) continued routinely to take podium places in F Modified and H Modified (FM and HM) classes in many national and international competitions on circuits and road races. Among others, these included the 50 Miles of MacDill (Florida), 100 Miles of Offutt, Thompson, Watkins Glen, Bridgehampton, Milwaukee, Wilmont, Cumberland, Elkhart Lake, Fairchild Park, and Sebring.

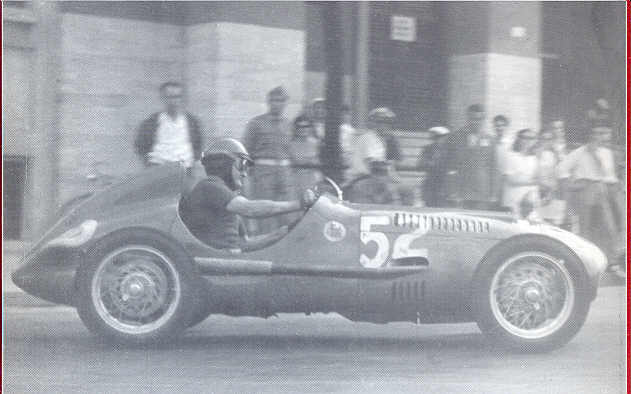
Ilario Bandini at Forlì with his Formula 3 car.

In 1955, Dave Michaels, competing with his 1,625 cc (99.2 cu in) Bandini-Offenhauser, won the 2000 cc E Modified (EM) class at Watkins, contesting on equal terms with Monzas, Maseratis, Cunninghams, and Mondials of greater engine capacity, establishing a Thompson track record by two-tenths of a second that would remain unbeaten for a year and a half. Dolph Vilardi won the 750 cc H Modified (HM) class in the US Championship with 6,000 points, beating Crosleys, Renaults, Giaurs, Panhards, Siatas, and Nardis, among other specials.

The next year saw Bandini wins by Rudkin at Berverly, Yares at Watkins, Michaels at Thompson (FM and time trial), and Bob Major at Bryanfan. Tom O'Brien also registered a Bandini win at Bryanfan when he topped the 2000 cc class with an Alfa Romeo-powered car; he later became an official driver for Alfa.

Also in 1956, a 750 sport siluro fitted with a David Uihlein-tuned 1250 cc MG engine, achieved two wins, two second places, a fourth, and only one retirement during the entire season.

In 1957, Bandinis dominated the 750 cc H Modified (HM) category: Melvin Sachs earned an SCCA title winning 3,600 points in the class; Rudkin (who had switched to Saab power for the season) ended the year second, with 3,200; Gordon Wright was sixth with 1,800: seventh was George Tipsword on 1,400; and Jack Connoly finished tenth in the points chase with 1,000. The fame of the Bandinis was reflected by writer and screenwriter William F. Nolan's choice of the Bandini Torpedo for star billing in his 1957 short story "Across the old man and into Bandini".

== Mid 1950s racing in Italy ==
In Italy Bandini was developing a car to take a Maserati power plant, as well as an O.S.C.A.-powered Formula Three model. Meanwhile, a Bandini chassis with Zagato bodywork was prepared for Alex Raymond. A 1955 Zagato Berlinetta won the Concourse d'Elegance at Rimini in 1957. The Zagato was also the first to race in America. It ran at Sebring and Daytona Beach in 1960 (piloted by Paul Richardson for Racemaster).

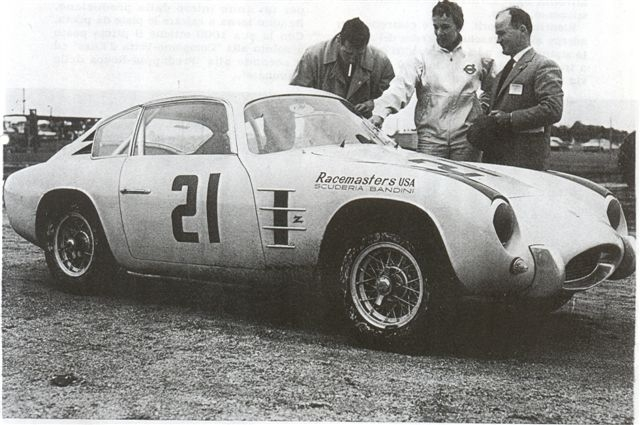
Bandini GT at Daytona.

At Predappio, Bandini won outright in 1955 and again in 1956, in which year the team came in third overall, achieving a class win at Bologna S. Luca, third place at Consuma, a win at Compiano Vetto d'Enza and another first place at the Emilia-Romagna Automobile Club championship held at the Modena aeroautodrome, a development (now derelict) constructed in 1949, and combining the functions of a small commercial airfield with those of a test track for the locally based manufacturers of sports cars.

1957 saw the debut of the updated 750 sports, the 750 International Sport, known colloquially as the Saponeta ("little bar of soap"). The overall design and construction were unchanged, but track and ride height were modified, and the car received an altered rear suspension geometry. The engine was developed, the combustion chambers being reduced in size, increasing compression and improving performance. The bodywork retained the characteristically Bandini lines that prompted the Saponeta sobriquet which caught on with Italian enthusiasts. Subsequently, the same car accommodated Bandini's first 850 cc engine, with a mixed distribution chain and gears and a different oil pump (whose design dated to 1955). This model later became a testbed for the 1000 cc engine, itself based on the 850. Garvini and Camisotti-Sintoni put in outstanding performances in the Mille Miglia, while Illario Bandini himself won the Bologna-S.Luca and achieved a seventh place in the inaugural event at Vallelunga. Another 750 International Sport driven by Massimo Bondi raced at Trento-Bondone.

In 1958, the Saponeta won the Predappio-Rocca delle Camminate (with the Bandini of Achille Galassi placed second), also winning at Compiano Vetto d'Enza, maintaining the winning form demonstrated the previous year at the Modena aeroautodrome.

The car also began winning in North America with James Eichenlaub, first at Cumberland and placed second to James Thompson at Toronto. Eichenlaub managed a third place at Watkins Glen and at Virginia, while Gene Parsons won at Miami (Florida) and again at Washington in the Congressional Cup. The team finished 1957 ranked second in the overall US classifications, having held the top spot until September, when they were unable to participate at Watkins Glen following a retirement at the Virginia circuit. Drivers such as Robert Samuelson and Jack Connolly also provided exciting displays and scored outstanding results, notably at Galveston, where Connolly made a comeback in the wet, recovering 22 positions in just six laps, only to be stopped by a fuel tank rupture.

During this period, Bandini also experimented with a mixed 'chain and gear' driven distributor system incorporating desmodromic valves.

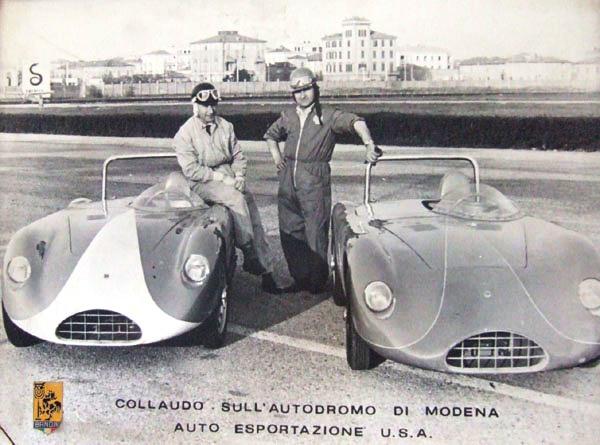
Bandini and Bondi with "Bandini 750 sport internazionale" during a test at Modena.

For 1959, Bandini achieved class victories at Compiano Vetto d'Enza (third overall), Trapani-Mount Erice, Predappio-Rocca delle Camminate, a second place at Trento-Bondone, a third at Vallelunga, and fourth in the St. Ambreus Cup (at the Monza high speed oval circuit). Cesenatico saw the first appearance of the Formula Junior with a new 850 cc engine (based on a project apparently originating in 1955) in a 1000P based prototype. In the same race, Edoardo Govoni took third in a 750, later achieving the same position in the Shell Cup at Vallelunga.

== Transformation and decline ==
Formula Junior regulations required an 1100 cc production engine. Very belatedly (seeing Coopers had been offering mid-engined racers for sale since 1946), the Bandini Formula Junior used a rear-mounted Fiat engine, tilted 15° from upright. It also featured drum brakes, and a Formula 3-style quick-change differential. The Bandini was immediately in demand in the United States. After a few months, a version with independent suspension appeared, though this was still no match for the dominating Coopers. Nevertheless, the car caught the attention of the specialist publications, of Juan Manuel Fangio, and of importer Biener, who immediately ordered five. It also gained a following with drivers such as Rodger Ward and Neil Babbs, Jr., who raced it in junior competitions until 1964, and with Roger Penske.

The 850 cc engine was significant because it was the first engine completely built by Bandini: it was the basis for the subsequent Bandini 1000 cc engine. The engine featured a monobloc bottom end, and choice of sidedraft or downdraught carburettors, fuel injection, or intercooled turbocharging. At the same time, Bandinis continued to appear in the United States powered by engines from Mercury, Saab, Offenhauser, MG, O.S.C.A., Alfa Romeo, and even 365 ci (6 liter) Cadillac engines (in the fashion of the Allard J2).

In 1960, Ilario Bandini was invited to Daytona, where the Racemaster team took part in the famous sports car event with a 'Saponetta' and a Zagato-bodied Berlinetta, driven by Luckens, Richardson, and Callanan. Bandini was feted as a true "star" by CBS television; he was presented with the Keys to the city by Daytona's mayor.

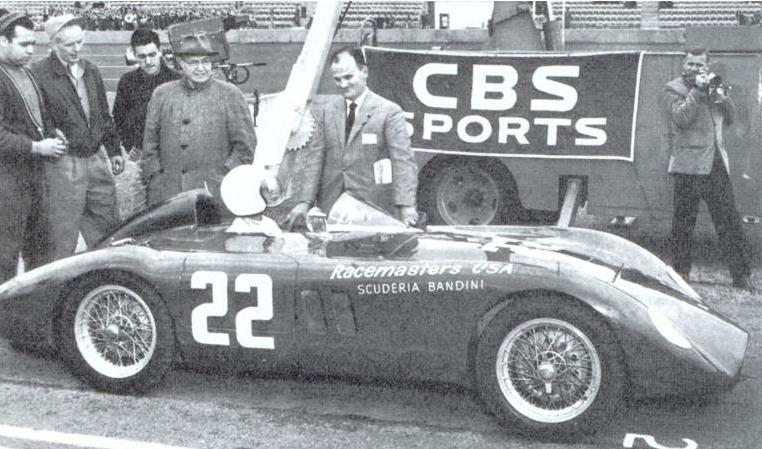
Bandini and a 750 Sport Internazionale at Daytona, 1960.

In the same year back in Italy, Bandini were active in the 750, 850 and 1000 classes using Banidini DOHC front and rear engined Formnula Junior, 1000P, and Saponetta models. This was the period of greatest growth for Bandini Automobiles. A contemporary newspaper reports discussion of plans under way to develop a Formula One Bandini, while the production of a prototype go-kart Bandini (with a Parilla engine) and a micro motorbike to serve as a courier for gear and spark plugs to assist rapid repairs at the racetrack.

As Bandini himself reached fifty years of age, he continued to race, including at Sassi-Superga, Aosta-Pila (second), Vergato-Cereglio, and Cesenatico. In the latter, he was joined by Guerino Lelli (fifth in a 750), Teodoro Zeccoli (out after breaking a sleeve of the 1000cc), and Edward Govoni (out after cracking the differential while his 850 lay third). Giorgio Cecchini finished third at Vallelunga in an 850, and Alberto Canali third at Salsomaggiore Monte S. Antonio in a 1000 sports.

While in 1961 the United States welcomed Bandini, Dave Lang (thanks to three victories and a second place that allowed him to take third place in the SCCA's HM Class Championship without even entering subsequent races) led national standings, twenty points up on Osca, in Italy are left engines of one liter engine capacity or less. Bandini himself had little luck in the Four Hours of Pescara (valid for the World Sports Car Championship), co-driving with Alberto Canali, but saw Cecchini and Cesare Sangiorgi classified sixth. Vince him to Reggio Emilia is the seventh to Salsomaggiore Terme-S.Antonio fifth Vallelunga and second at Predappio where Cecchini won, also in a Bandini 1000.

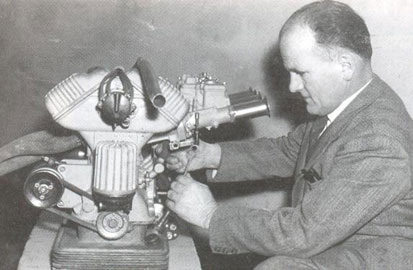
Ilario Bandini with a 1000 cc engine.

Cecchini placed fourth in Salsomaggiore, forced to retire after a fuel pump failure in the lead at Asiago, and after taking the pole position at Vallelunga suffered clutch failure one lap from the flag. He came fourth at Parma-Poggio of Berceto, sixth in the Shell Trophy at Vallelunga, and third at Trento Bondone.

The 100GT was developed in 1963, with bodywork by Corna, subcontractor of Zagato. At Predappio, Lelli topped Cecchini by coming third again with the 1000 sports, while Hilary placed fifth at Consuma (substantiating world sport) and took the Shell Trophy at Vallelunga.

1964 was the year of four for Bandini, finishing in this position at the Predappio-Rocca delle walks (preceded by Bandinis of Cecchini and Benelli) and at Ascoli-Colle S. Marco. He was fourth Trento-Bondone (valid for the European mountain championship), again behind Benelli, and the Cup Beans at Osimo (preceded by Cecchini). Benelli was third in the Cuneo (Garessio-hill St. Bernard), the Cup of Cimino (in Rome), according to Teramo and Bolzano-Mendola, while finishing ninth at Vallelunga, and retiring for breach of the exchange at the Targa Florio.

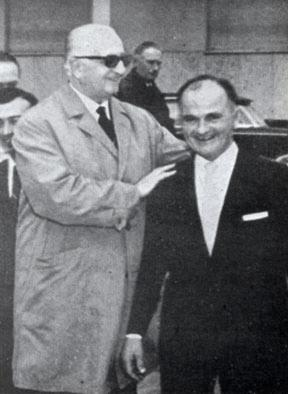
Ilario Bandini and Enzo Ferrari in Forlì in 1964.

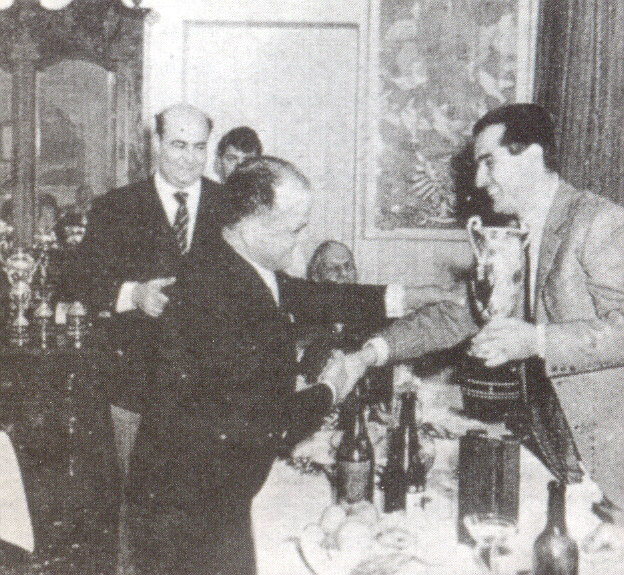
Lorenzo Bandini rewards Ilario Bandini.

In 1965, a version of the 1000P (unusually, Belgian racing yellow) gave Benelli a win at the Predappio hillclimb and the first Castione Baratti (Parma) then runs Paganelli with the Trento-Bondone Cesana and Sestriere. Cecchini with a front-engined 1000 ran close second to Predappio and retired at the Mugello road circuit. Benelli came fifth in the Shell Trophy at Vallelunga (Bandini himself eighth), retired in the Targa Florio, took third at Vergato Cereglio, and kept Bandini in the limelight with a fourth and valid proof for world title on the Mugello road course.

Despite engines enlarged to 850 cc, and remaining unbeaten from 1961 until 1963 in SCCA's South-West Division championship, in the mid-1960s, production for the United States was stopped for lack of adequate funding, radical changes of regulations, unfunded riscuotibili, and competition from large manufacturers. Many Italian manufacturers were in crisis, and Bandini started to produce prototypes intended mainly as privateers for Italian "gentleman drivers" who mainly ran hillclimbs. There was no wavering in continual improvement on the technical side, so in 1966, a new mid-engined Bandini 1000 appeared. A barchetta with new lines and Colotti gearbox, the position of the updated one litre engine representing the biggest change. This car was produced into the mid-seventies, when it was donated by Bandini to the town of Forli, which still holds it.

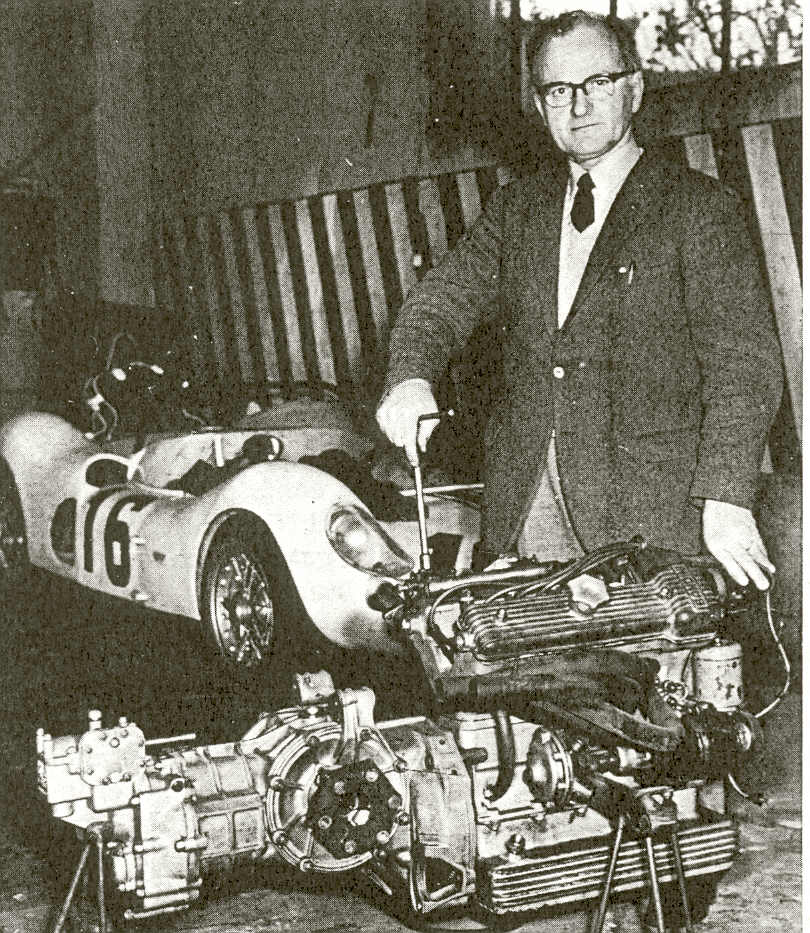
Engine and gearbox of the mid-engined 1000.

In 1968, at the Turin Exhibition of Sports Cars, the new Bandini saloncino was presented. It proved unsuccessful at Mugello the same year, came out in street trim and later was further amended slightly in front of the body.

A new 1000V sports prototype was born in 1970 with the solution to the carburetors at the centre of the head in an upright position. After two years, the 1000SP introduced Bandini's first aerodynamic element, a rear wing.

Recent prototypes have won the Cup Water Cerelia, Camucia-Cortona, the Colle S. Bartolo (PU), the Gubbio-Madonna della Cima, the Cup of Chianti (half kilo of underweight) and seized countless placements: Trieste-Opicina, Bologna-Raticosa, Ascoli-hill St. Marco, Castione Passo della Presolana, circuit of Mugello, Targa Florio, Magione and many other races (predominantly hillclimbs) throughout the country.

Bandini, in his seventies, as well as dealing with restoration of older models, continued the study of new ones. The company in 1980 presented the 1300 with 16 valves, mechanical fuel injection, and electronic ignition.

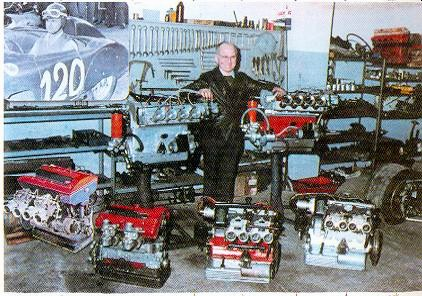
Il padrone surrounded with Bandini engines.

In 1975, Bandini hosted the Group Bandini, an exhibition dedicated to the marque, for drivers who had worked for him. Until 1979, appearing in Forlì included Formula One World Driving Champions James Hunt (1976 for McLaren) and Niki Lauda (1977 for Ferrari) Bandini restarted the Predappio-Rocca delle Camminate hillclimb at Forlì in 1978, after being interrupted ten years earlier.

In 1981, Bandini received from New York University an honoris causa (honorary doctorate) in mechanical engineering, and a Bandini was inducted at the Museum of Marconi in Los Angeles. This was followed by further rewards, such as the gold medal of the Municipality of Forlì and the medal allocation from Italian National Olympic Committee (CONI) "as proper recognition of many years carried out in favour of Italian sport."

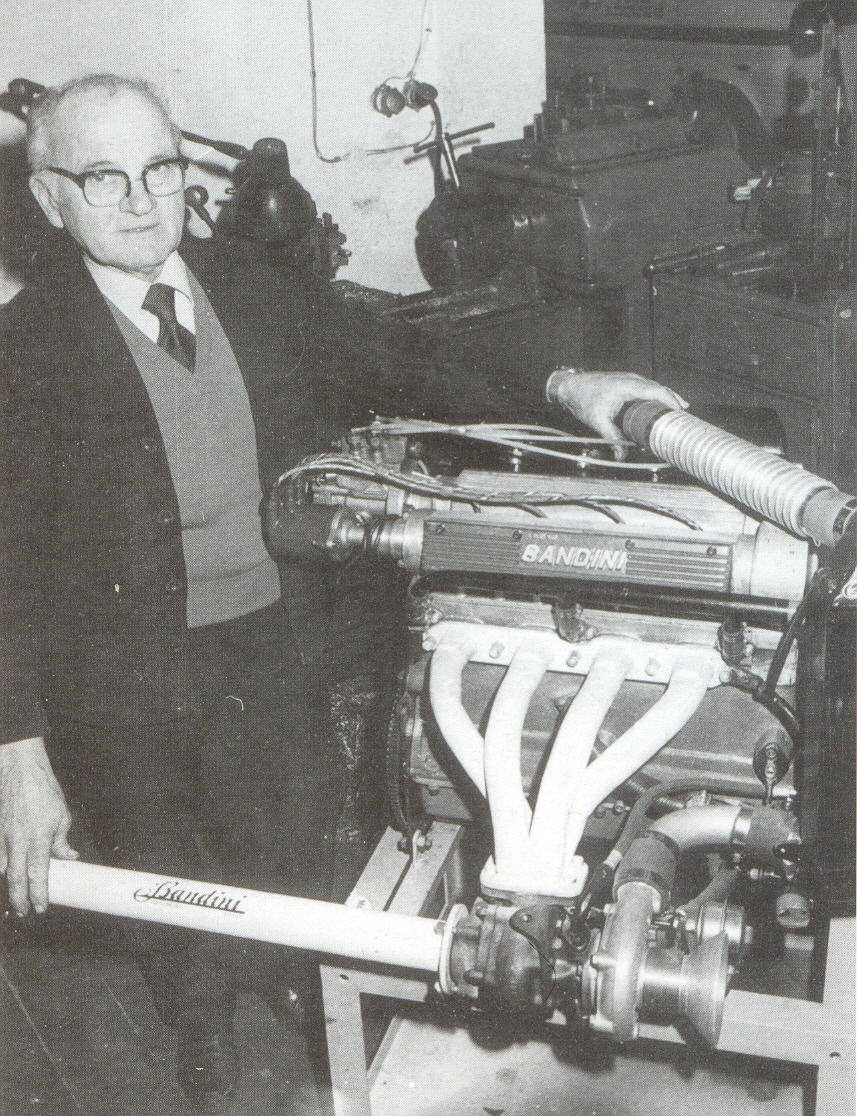
Ilario Bandini and mille (1000) turbo.

A few years later came his final creation, the Berlinetta 1000 turbo 16v, at the age of 80, just before his death at Forlì on 12 April 1992.

== See also ==
- Bandini Automobili
