= Motos (disambiguation) =

Motos is an action arcade game released by Namco in 1985. It may also refer to:

== People ==
- Javi Motos (born 1988), Spanish football manager
- Pablo Motos (born 1965), Spanish television show host and comedian
- Teresa Motos (born 1963), Spanish former field hockey player

== Other uses ==
- Motos, a fictitious creature found in Will Self's novel The Book of Dave
- Dafra Motos, Brazilian builder of motorcycles founded in 2007
- AKT motos, a Colombian company headquartered in Envigado

== See also ==
- Moto (disambiguation)
- Moto (surname)
