= Motto (surname) =

Motto is a surname. Notable people with the surname include:

- Jerome Motto (1921–2015), American psychiatrist
- Rocco Motto (fl. 1930s), Italian entrepreneur and designer

== See also ==
- Motto (disambiguation)
- Motta (surname)
- Motte (surname)
