= Motto (disambiguation) =

A motto is a phrase meant to formally describe the general motivation or intention of a social group or organization.

It can also refer to:

- Aphorism, a short, suggestive expression of a guiding principle
- Motto (surname), surname

== People and characters ==
- Motto McLean (1925–2019), Canadian ice hockey player

=== Fictional characters ===
- Peli Motto, a Star Wars character from "The Mandalorian"

== Places ==
- Motto, a village in Bitung, Indonesia
- Motto River, Virginia, US; a tributary of the South River
- Motto Farm, New South Wales, Australia

== Literature ==
- Epigraph (literature), a sentence, phrase, or word, prefixed to an essay, chapter, or the like, suggestive of its subject matter
- A short quotation, joke, or an anecdotal message printed on a piece of paper inside a Christmas cracker

== Music ==
- In music, a head-motif

=== Albums ===
- Motto (EP), 2026, by South Korean girl group Itzy

=== Songs ===
- "Motto" (Tanpopo song), 1999, the second single by J-pop group Tanpopo
- "Motto..." (Kana Nishino song), a 2009 single by Japanese singer Kana Nishino
- "The Motto" (Drake song), 2011
- "The Motto" (Tiësto and Ava Max song), 2021
- "Motto" (NF song), 2023
- "Motto" (Itzy song), 2026

== Other uses ==
- Motto Pictures, NYC production company
- Rocco Motto, Italian coachbuilding company established in 1932
- Motto by Hilton, a Hilton Worldwide hotel brand

== See also ==
- The dictionary definition of もっと at Wiktionary (Japanese: もっと, romanized: motto, lit. 'more')
- List of mottos
- Motto della Tappa, Lugano Prealps, Switzerland-Italy; a mountain
- Motto Motto Motto (Japanese: もっともっともっと, lit. 'More More More'), a 2003 manga graphic novel by Kazumi Kazui
- Motto Motto (disambiguation)
- Moto (disambiguation)
- More (disambiguation)
