= Motomoto =

Motomoto, Moto-Moto, or variant, may refer to:

== People ==
- Joseph Dupont (bishop) (1850–1930, nicknamed "Moto Moto"), French Catholic missionary priest to Zambia

=== Characters ===
- Moto Moto, a character from the Madagascar franchise
- Daisuke Motomoto, a character from YuYu Hakusho

== Places ==
- Moto Moto Museum, Mbala, Zambia; a museum of Zambian culture, named after the bishop

== Other uses ==
- Les Moto-Moto, a Kenyan band; see List of Wanyika bands
- "Moto Moto" (song), a 2019 song by DJ Arafat; see DJ Arafat discography
- "Moto Moto" (song), a song by Jose Chameleone

== See also ==
- Motto Motto (disambiguation)
- Moto (disambiguation)
- Motto (disambiguation)
