= Motto Motto =

Motto Motto may refer to:

- "Motto Motto...", a 1995 single by Ryōko Shinohara
- "Motto Motto", a 1999 single by Zeppet Store
- "Motto Motto", a 2002 song by Ayako Ikeda off the album Water Colors
- "Motto Motto", a 2003 song by Hitomi Momoi off the album Kaeru no Uta
- "Motto Motto", a 2015 single by Tritops

== See also ==
- Motto Motto Motto (Japanese: もっともっともっと, lit. 'More More More'), a 2003 manga graphic novel by Kazumi Kazui
- Motomoto (disambiguation)
- Motto (disambiguation)
- Moto (disambiguation)
- More (disambiguation)
