= Motif (music) =

Short recurring musical phrase

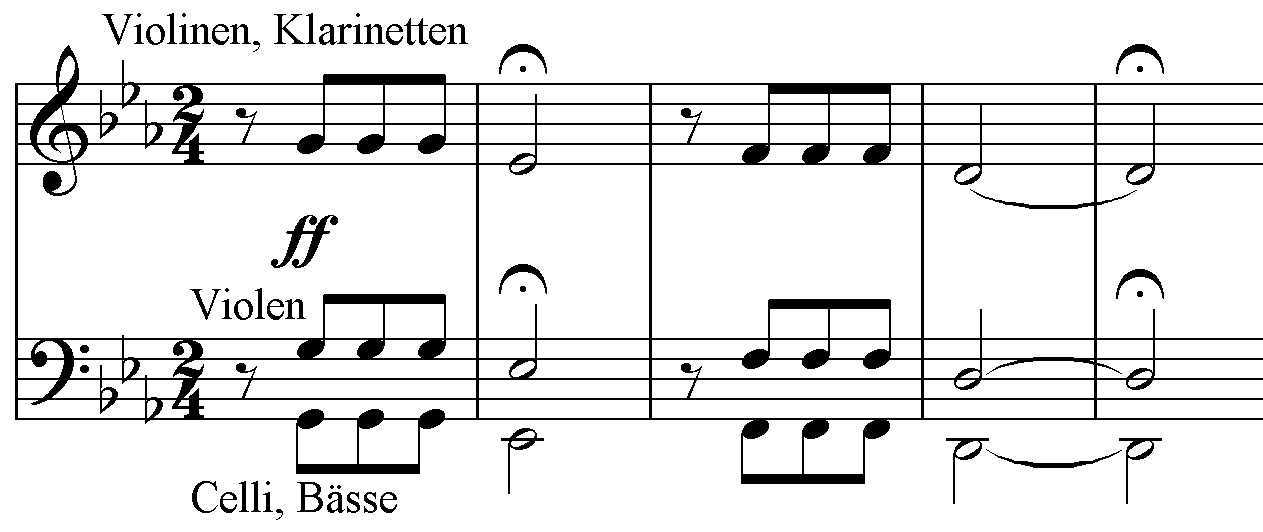
In Beethoven's Fifth Symphony, a four-note figure becomes the most important motif of the work, extended melodically and harmonically to provide the main theme of the first movement.

Two note opening motif from Jean Sibelius's Finlandia.

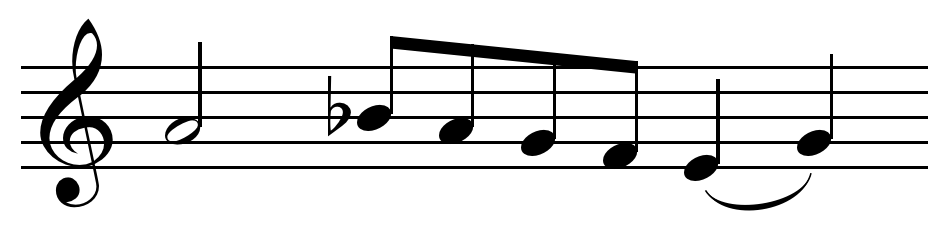
Motif from Machaut's Mass, notable for its length of seven notes.

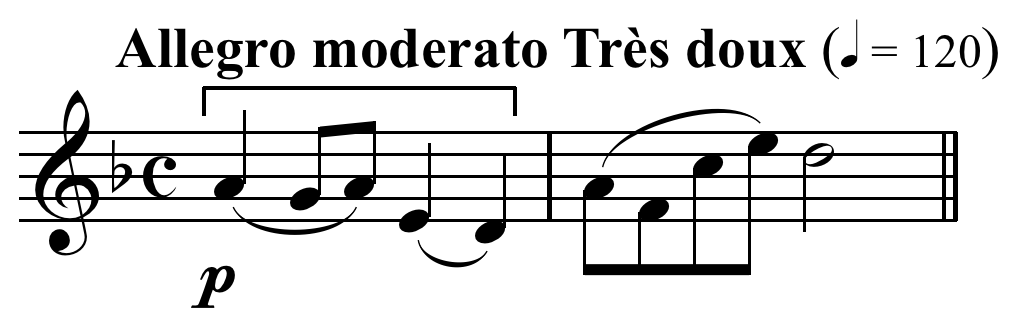
Motif from Ravel's String Quartet, first movement.

In music, a motif (/moʊˈtiːf/) or motive is a short musical idea, salient recurring figure, musical fragment, or succession of notes that has some special importance in or is characteristic of a composition. The motif is the smallest structural unit possessing thematic identity.

== History ==
The Encyclopédie de la Pléiade defines a motif as a "melodic, rhythmic, or harmonic cell", whereas the 1958 Encyclopédie Fasquelle maintains that it may contain one or more cells, though it remains the smallest analyzable element or phrase within a subject. It is commonly regarded as the shortest subdivision of a theme or phrase that still maintains its identity as a musical idea. "The smallest structural unit possessing thematic identity". Grove and Larousse also agree that the motif may have harmonic, melodic and/or rhythmic aspects, Grove adding that it "is most often thought of in melodic terms, and it is this aspect of the motif that is connoted by the term 'figure'."

A harmonic motif is a series of chords defined in the abstract, that is, without reference to melody or rhythm. A melodic motif is a melodic formula, established without reference to intervals. A rhythmic motif is the term designating a characteristic rhythmic formula, an abstraction drawn from the rhythmic values of a melody.

A motif thematically associated with a person, place, or idea is called a leitmotif or idée fixe. Occasionally such a motif is a musical cryptogram of the name involved. A head-motif (German: Kopfmotiv) is a musical idea at the opening of a set of movements which serves to unite those movements.

Roger Scruton, however, suggests that a motif is distinguished from a figure in that a motif is foreground while a figure is background: "A figure resembles a moulding in architecture: it is 'open at both ends', so as to be endlessly repeatable. In hearing a phrase as a figure, rather than a motif, we are at the same time placing it in the background, even if it is...strong and melodious".

Any motif may be used to construct complete melodies, themes and pieces. Musical development uses a distinct musical figure that is subsequently altered, repeated, or sequenced throughout a piece or section of a piece of music, guaranteeing its unity.

== Examples ==
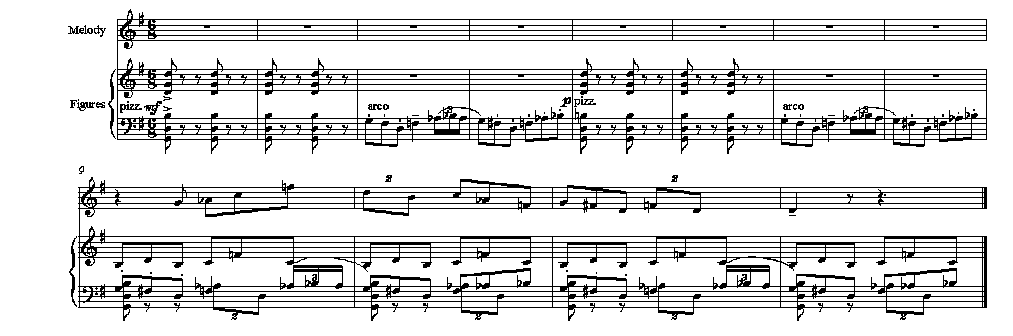
A phrase originally presented as a motif may become a figure which accompanies another melody, as in the second movement of Claude Debussy's String Quartet (1893). White would classify the accompaniment as motivic material since it was, "derived from an important motive stated earlier".

Such motivic development has its roots in the keyboard sonatas of Domenico Scarlatti and the sonata form of Haydn and Mozart's age. Arguably Beethoven achieved the highest elaboration of this technique; the famous "fate motif" —the pattern of three short notes followed by one long one—that opens his Fifth Symphony and reappears throughout the work in surprising and refreshing permutations is a classic example.

Motivic saturation is the "immersion of a musical motif in a composition", i.e., keeping motifs and themes below the surface or playing with their identity, and has been used by composers including Miriam Gideon, as in "Night is my Sister" (1952) and "Fantasy on a Javanese Motif" (1958), and Donald Erb . The use of motifs is discussed in Adolph Weiss' "The Lyceum of Schönberg".

== Definitions ==
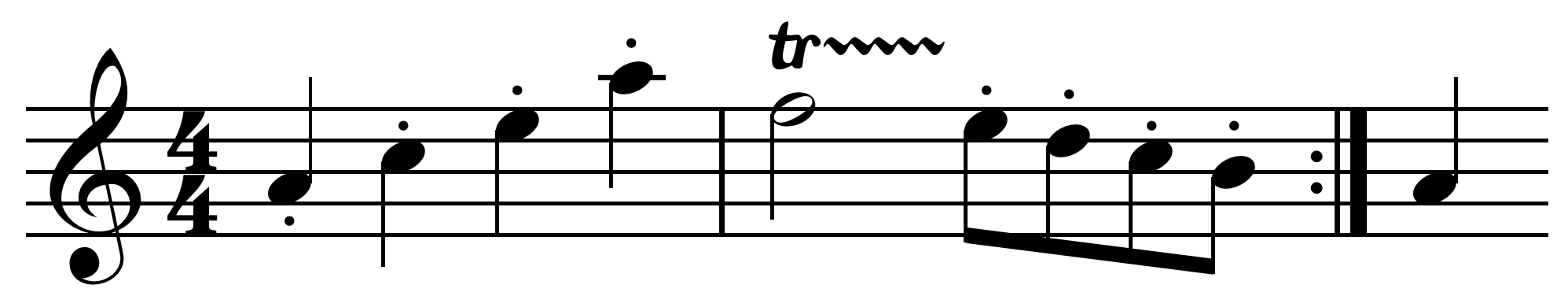
"Curse" motif from film scores, associated with villains and ominous situations.

Hugo Riemann defines a motif as "the concrete content of a rhythmically basic time-unit."

Anton Webern defines a motif as, "the smallest independent particle in a musical idea", which are recognizable through their repetition.

Arnold Schoenberg defines a motif as, "a unit which contains one or more features of interval and rhythm [whose] presence is maintained in constant use throughout a piece".

== Head-motif ==
Head-motif (German: Kopfmotiv) refers to an opening musical idea of a set of movements which serves to unite those movements. It may also be called a motto, and is a frequent device in cyclic masses.

== See also ==
- Idée fixe (psychology)
- Motif (art)
- Motif (literature)
- Riff
