= Moto (surname) =

Moto is a surname. Notable people with the surname include:

- Hirokuni Moto (born 1970), Japanese boxer
- Iwa Moto, screen name of Filipino Japanese actress and model Aileen Iwamoto (born 1988)
- Kaoru Moto (1917–1992), U.S. Army soldier awarded the Medal of Honor
- Severo Moto Nsá (born 1943), opposition politician in Equatorial Guinea known as Severo Moto
- Yves Bitséki Moto (born 1983), Gabonese football goalkeeper

== See also ==
- Moto (disambiguation)
- Motos (disambiguation), Spanish surname
- Mota (surname), Portuguese and Spanish surname
