= Bandini Automobili =

Former Italian automobile manufacturer

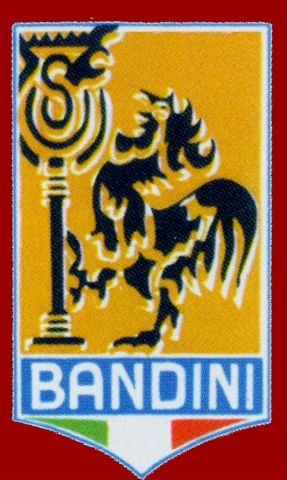
- Industry: Automobile
- Founded: 1946
- Headquarters: Forlì, Italy
- Key people: Eng. H.C. Ilario Bandini, founder
- Products: Sports cars
- Website: www.ilariobandini.it www.bandinicars.com

Bandini Automobili was an Italian automobile manufacturer that operated in Forlì between 1946 and 1992. It was named after its founder, Ilario Bandini, who designed and built the cars and also raced them. The company produced about 75 cars, mostly small-displacement sports and racing models, of which around 40 were sold in the United States, where modified Bandini Siluros won SCCA class championships in the 1950s. Production ceased after Ilario Bandini's death in 1992, and the original workshop was converted into a museum the same year. The Bandini name was later revived when a descendant of the founder partnered with the design house GFG Style to present the electric Dora concept car in 2020.

== History ==
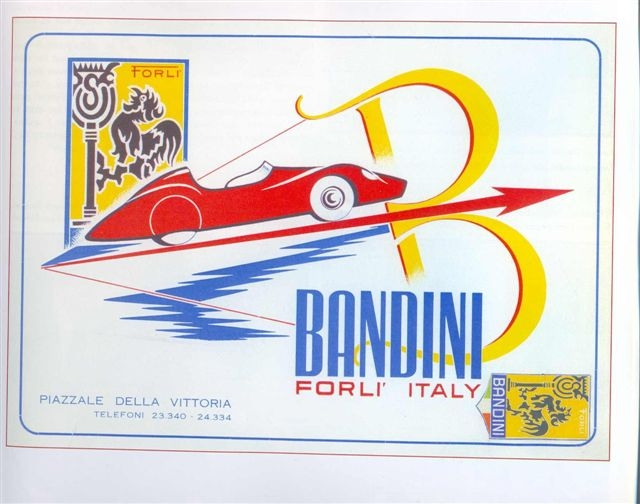

Bandini was founded in 1946 in Forlì. The first Bandini, the Prima, used a modified Fiat 1100 engine; its body was made from aluminium and its chassis was based on a Fiat 1100 that Bandini had hidden from the Germans during World War II. Following on from this, Bandini made the 1100 Sport and the 1100 Siluro. It was the Siluro that gave them their first race victory in the Giro dell'Umbria (not to be confused with the bicycle race of the same name). The chassis for these were built from tubular steel.

American importers, Tony Pompeo (originally from Pescara) and Perry Fina, took an interest in Bandinis and imported a Siluro. The Italian racing driver Giovanni Bracco went over to the States to promote the cars. At the suggestion of Pompeo Bandini began to put 724 cc Crosley engines in the Siluro so that they could compete in H modified racing events. The modified Siluros won SCCA class championships in 1955 and 1957. In 1957 Bandini made the Sport International "Saponetta". It was a two-seat sports car with a tubular steel frame and room for engines of up to 1.0 litre. Bandini nicknamed the car "Saponetta" (little soap) because of its rounded, smooth shape. The Formula 3 car of 1954 had disc brakes on all four wheels, copying the 1951 C-type Jaguar. The Zagato bodied Bandini GT raced in Daytona and 12 Hours of Sebring. The coupé made by the coachbuilder Corna had a 1000 cc engine mounted in the front.

The company was later revived in the 21st century by Michele Bandini, great grandson of Ilario Bandini. Bandini partnered with GFG Style, a company founded by Giorgetto Giugiaro and his son Fabrizio Giugiaro. GFG Style revealed the Bandini Dora Concept in 2020, a roofless, two-seater electric hypercar featuring two electric motors producing a combined power output of 536 bhp and 500 lb ft of torque.

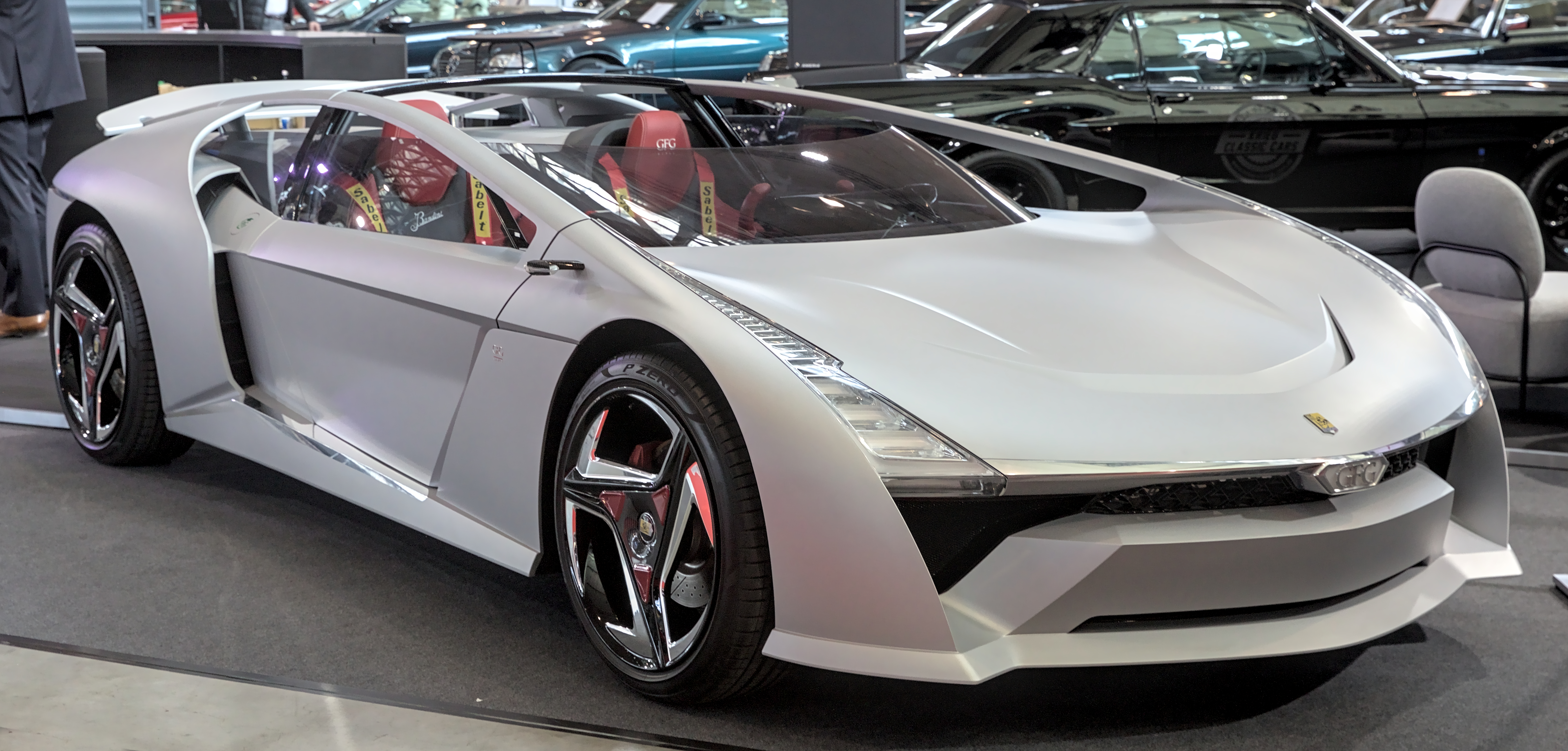
2020 GFG Style Bandini Dora Concept

== Racing history ==
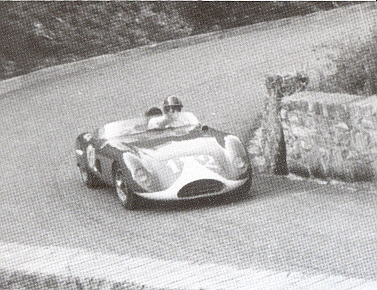
A Saponetta in action

The company's owner, Ilario Bandini, divided his time between design and manufacturing of the cars, and as a race driver. He entered and drove Bandinis in more than 60 races, including both hillclimb events and track racing, among them the Mille Miglia from 1947 until 1965, achieving 19 first-place finishes and 18 podiums in the 750 cc and 1000 cc classes. In 1953 a 750 Siluro driven by Massimo Bondi won the Trofeo Franco Mazzotti on the Mille Miglia.

In the United States, a Bandini 750 Siluro driven by Dolph Vilradi won the SCCA HM class championship in 1955. In 1957, Melvin Sachs won the HM class, one of five Bandinis in the first ten positions. These successes resulted in Ilario being presented with the Gold Key of Daytona and later, in 1981, the Laurea H.C. award in mechanical engineering from Pro Deo University of New York. In 1959 he produced a Formula Junior that achieved considerable competition success. Bandinis won SCCA Class HMod races into the mid-1960s. A Bandini Siluro won the SCCA Southwest Regional Championship from 1961–1963 and the Saponetta took 3rd place in the National HMod class in 1961. Bandini continued to make one-off cars into the 1980s.

== Bandini Museum and Register ==
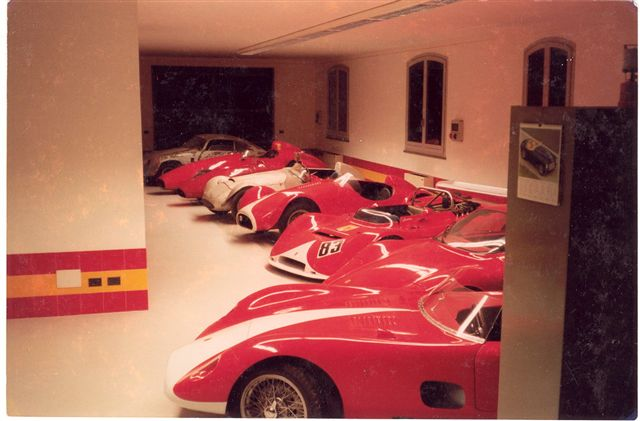
Bandini Collection

In 1992, Dino Bandini converted the company's original workshop into a museum with the purpose of preserving historical documents, technical records, and the most representative models of Bandini automobiles for public display. The decision was prompted by his discovery of inaccuracies regarding Bandini's history in a car magazine. At the time of its establishment, the museum housed ten Bandini cars. Today, a total of 47 officially-recognised Bandini vehicles exist worldwide.

== Models ==
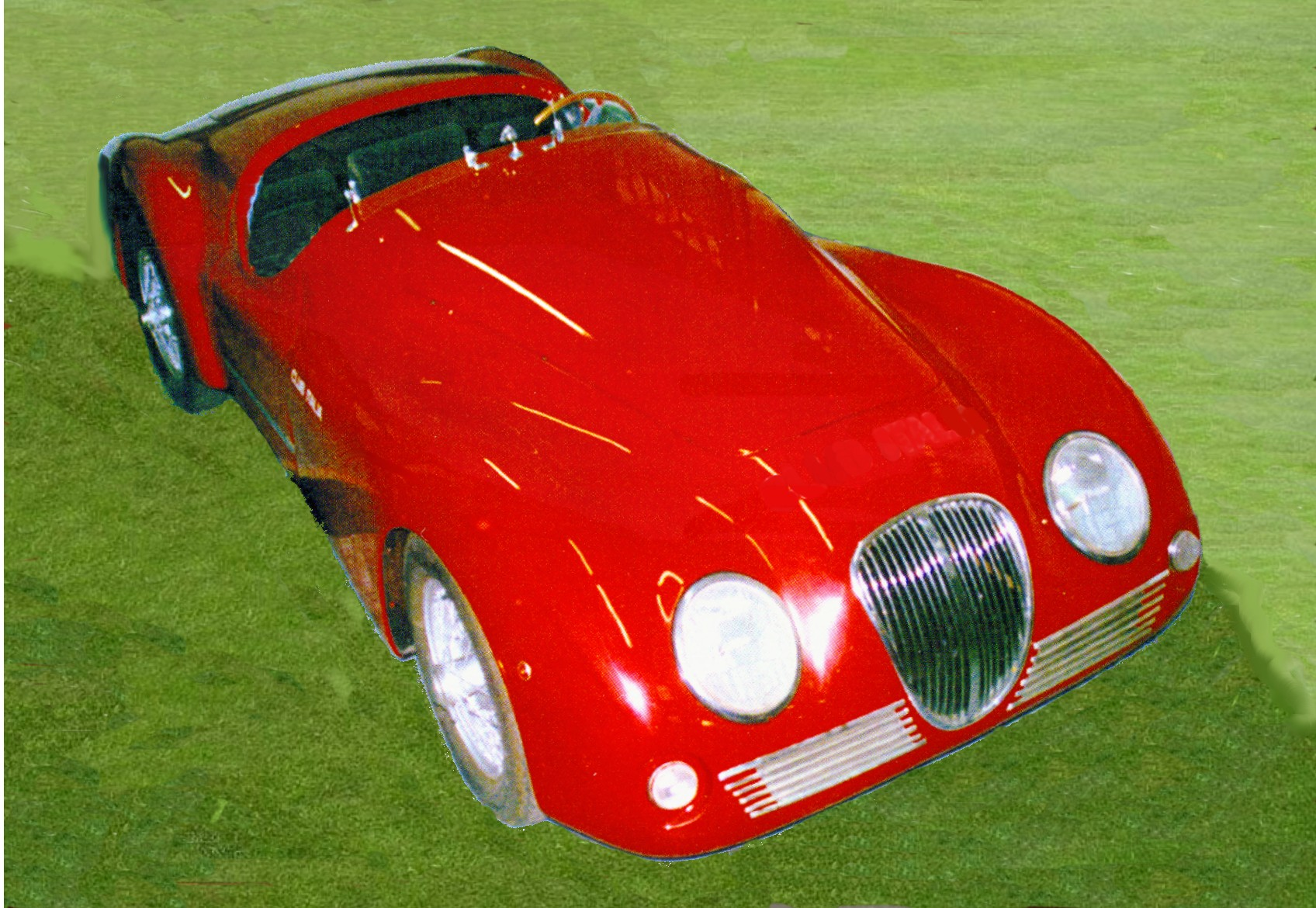
1946 "La prima"

- "La prima" 1100/46 (1946). Made from a modified Fiat 1100 chassis. The suspension used components from a Gilera motorcycle with torsion bar independent front suspension and independent rear suspension, inboard brakes, and a two-seater aluminium sports car body made by Rocco Motto.
- 1100 sport (1947–50). Designed for road use. The chassis for both this and the Siluro was made from aircraft grade materials with assistance from Caproni.
- 1100 siluro (1947–49). This two seater was designed as a track car. It had cycle wings.
- 750 sport siluro (1950–56). A 724cc Crosley engine - bored out to 747cc and fitted with a Bandini twin cam head for racing primarily in the United States.
- Bandini-Maserati 1500 (1952). Only one of these was built. In 1954 it was exported to the United States and fitted with a 1500cc Maserati engine for SCCA FM class championship. Drivers included Bernhard Vihl, George Parrington, and David Michaels. It was to race at Sebring on 16 March 1955 but did not arrive.
- Formula 3 (1954–58). At least four of these racing cars were built and were powered by an under-500cc four cylinder Crosley engine.
- 750 GT Veloce - Zagato (1955). Reports suggest the car was built for Alex Raymond, a cartoonist. It won Best of Show at the 1957 Rimini Concorso di Eleganza. In 1959 the GT was raced in the United States by Victor Lukens and Fred Haynes at Daytona, Watkins Glen, and Sebring under the Racemasters/Scuderia Bandini. During 1960 it achieved two class wins, two DNFs, and a couple of non-podium finishes.
- 750 sport internazionale "Saponetta" (1957–61). This replaced the Siluro and was more streamlined. Originally called the 750 Sport Internazionale, to commemorate Ilario Bandini's motor racing wins, Ilario called it the Saponetta (little bar of soap, because of its shape). Two of the cars were built for the 1957 Mille Miglia without success, but in 1958 had a number of class wins.
- Formula Junior (1959–62). Sources differ on the total built, citing nine or ten, mostly sold to the United States.
- 1000/62 P (1962–65). A barchetta sports prototype race car with fully independent suspension.
- 1000 GT (1963). A coupé.
- 1000/66 sport (1966)
- 1000 Sports Coupe - Saloncino (1968). This car was first shown at the Salone Internazionale dell'Automobile di Torino in 1968. It was the first sports coupé the company made.
- 1000/70 V (1970)
- 1000 SP (1972). Originally orange in colour, the prototype entered the 1972 "Targa Florio" but did not start due to an accident. It was repainted blue when repaired by Bandini. The prototype had an adjustable rear wing that could also be increased in width.
- 1300 prototipo (1980). A barchetta style open race car.
- 1000 turbo berlinetta (1992). Under final construction when Ilario Bandini died.

== Gallery ==
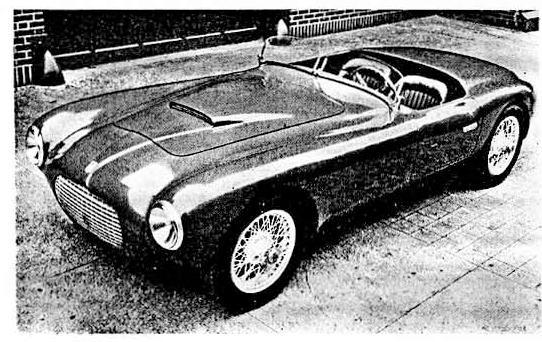
1947 1100 Siluro Sport

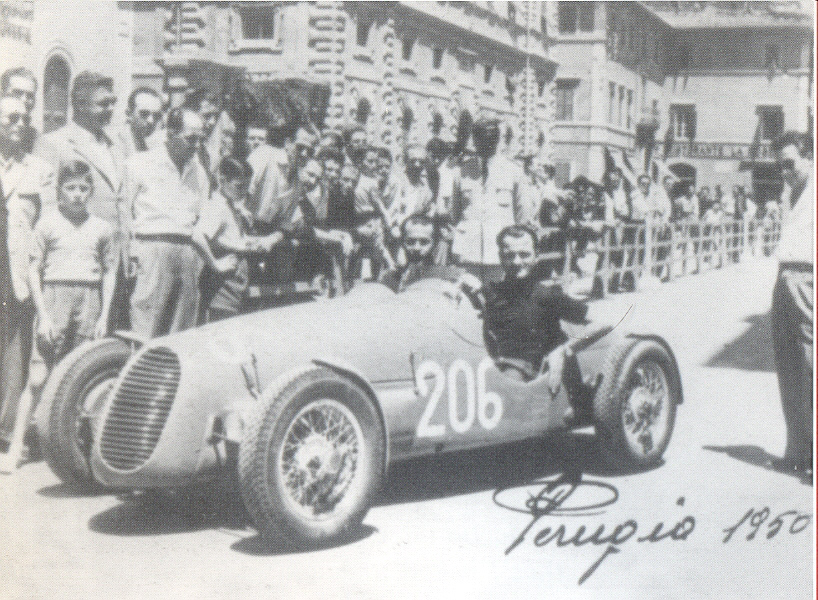
1947 1100 Siluro

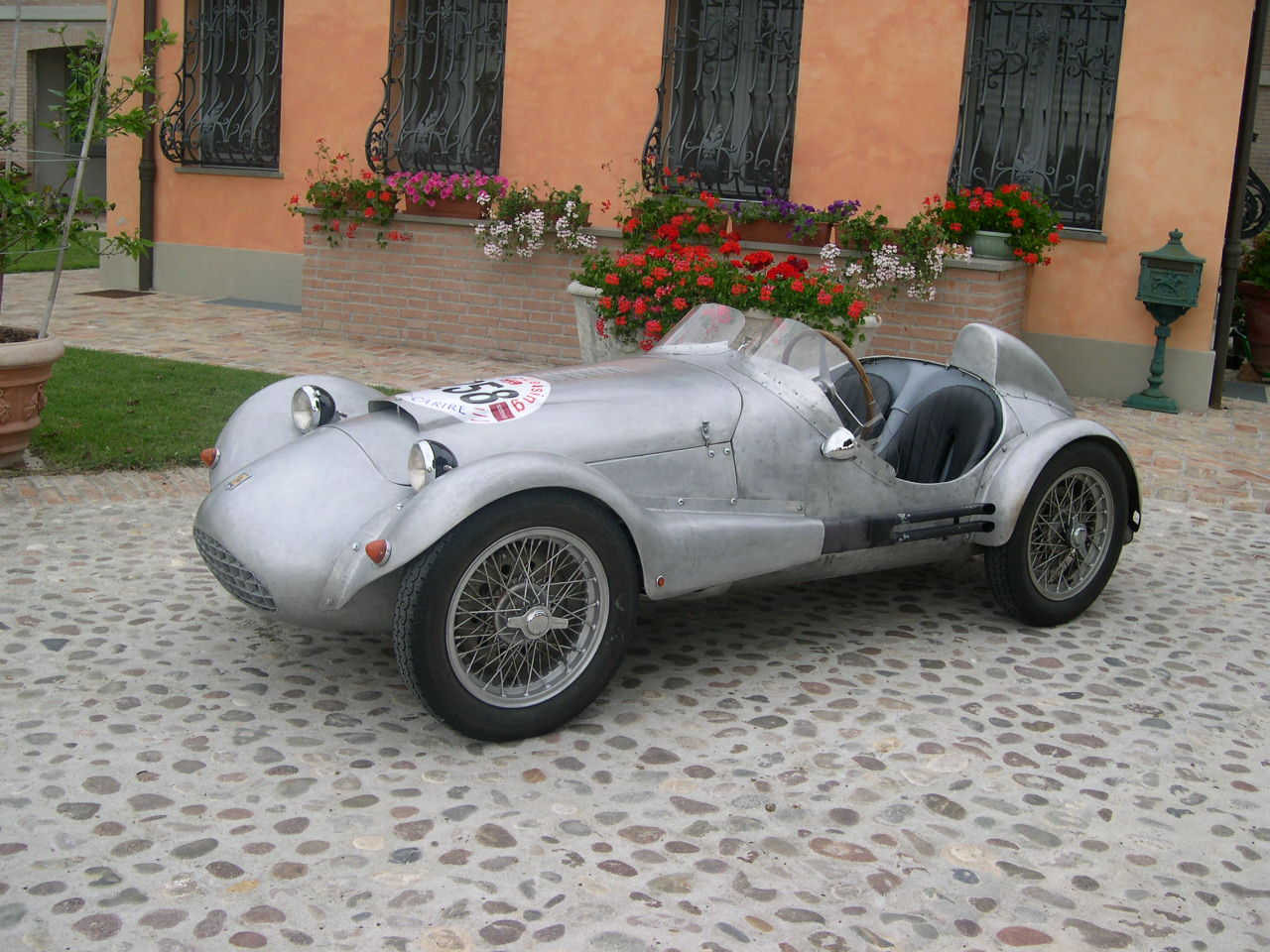
1950 750 Siluro Sport

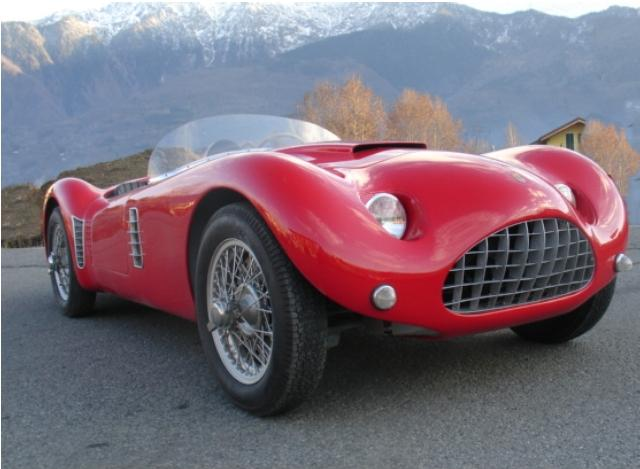
1952 Bandini Maserati 1500

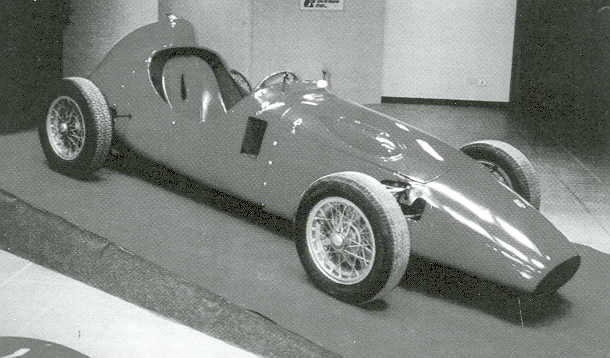
1954 Formula 3

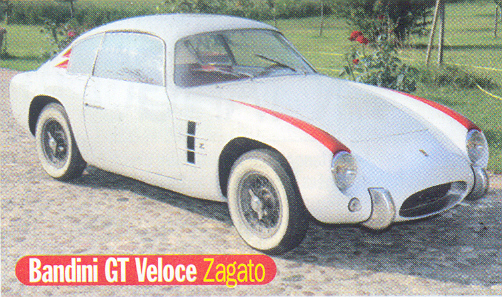
1955 GT Veloce Zagato

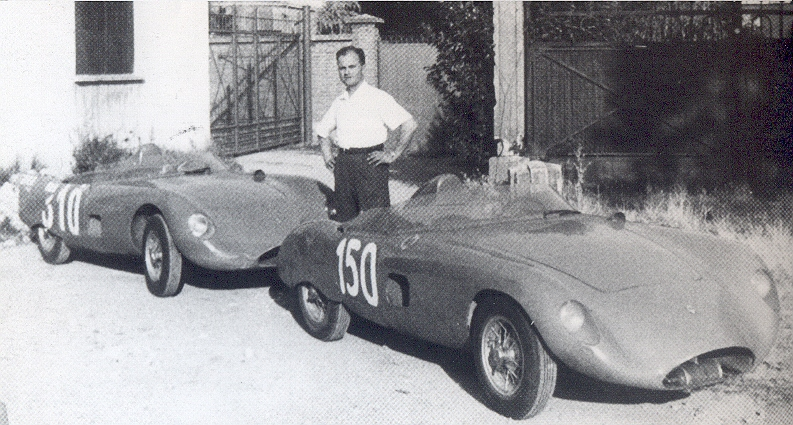
1957 Saponetta

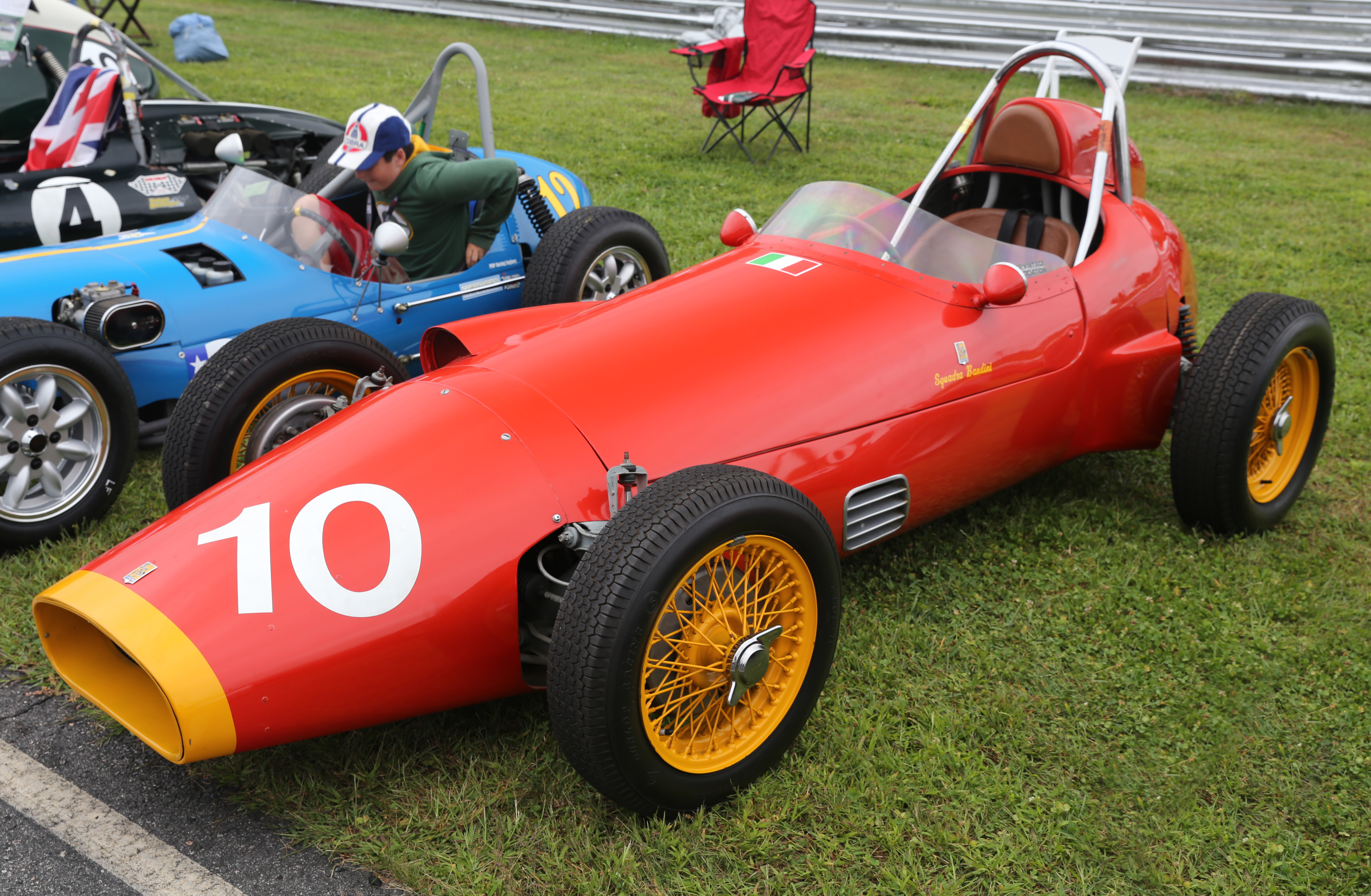
1959 Formula Junior

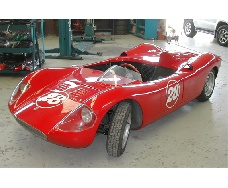
1962 1000 P

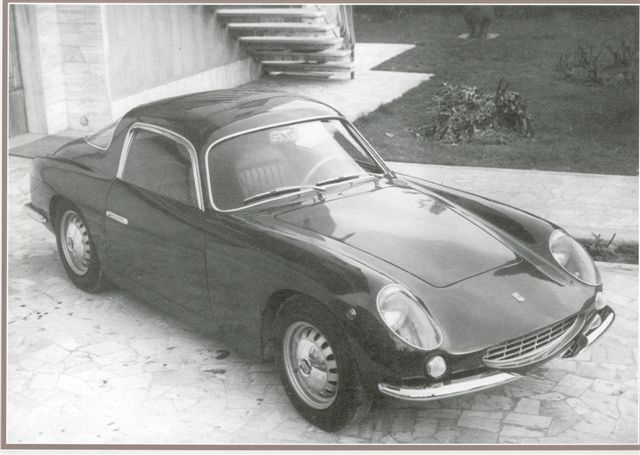
1963 1000 GT

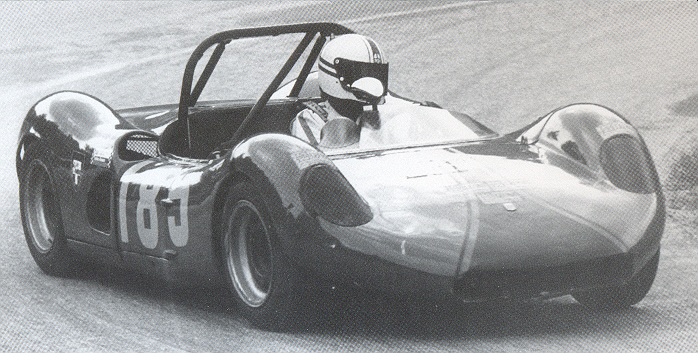
1966 1000 sp66

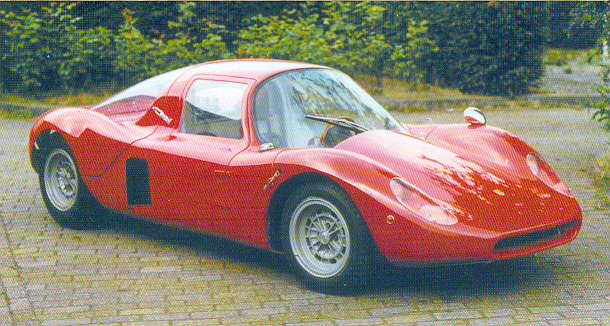
1968 1000 Saloncino sports coupé

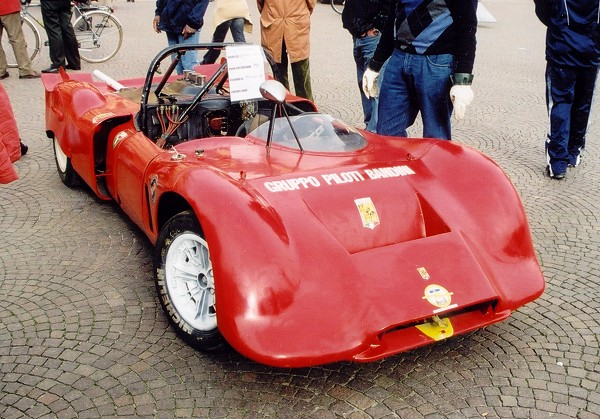
1970 1000 V

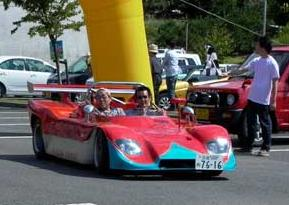
1972 1000 SP

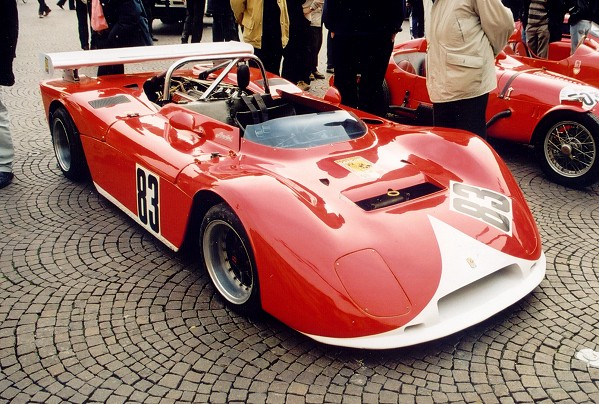
1980 1300 prototipo

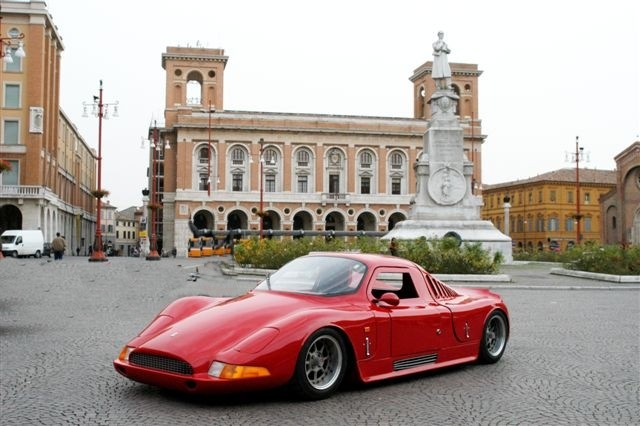
1992 1000 turbo berlinetta

== See also ==
- Ilario Bandini
