= Cumberland Race Track =

Race track in Maryland, US

Coordinates: 39°36′31″N 78°47′52″W

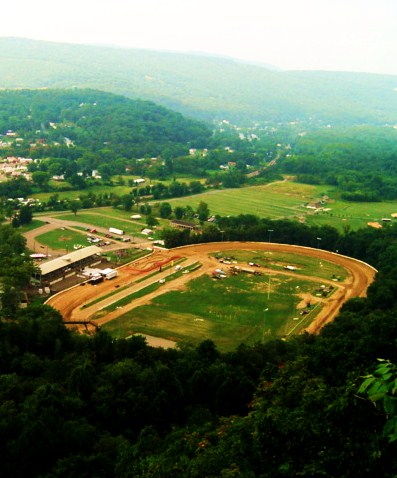

The Cumberland Race Track (1924-1961), also known as the Fairgo Race Track, was located just outside the west side of Cumberland, Maryland along McMullen Highway at the location of the present day Allegany County Fairgrounds. The Track facility boasted 300 horse stalls and was the first half-mile track in the state of Maryland for racing horses. The Track was founded in 1924 when the Fairgo company was formed by the stock holders of the Cumberland Fair Associations. The track was well regarded as one of the most beautiful tracks in Maryland and frequency attracted 20,000 to 25,000 spectators during its peak years. The biggest day was Governor's Day, when the governor would come in from Annapolis, Maryland to attend the races.

The Cumberland Race track was part of the Maryland horse racing circuit, where horse races took place in order starting with Timonium Racetrack followed by Marlboro Race Track, and then the Cumberland Race Track. In order to transport the horses to the Cumberland Race track 12-16 Baltimore and Ohio Railroad cars were used as transport, arriving in Cumberland 14 hours later on Sunday mornings.

Today, the race track is being used for auto racing, currently under the name Thundering Rock Raceway.
