= Motto della Tappa =

Mountain in Switzerland

- Cima Verta
- Location within Alps

Highest point
- Elevation: 2,078 m (6,818 ft)
- Prominence: 68 m (223 ft)
- Parent peak: Pizzo di Gino
- Coordinates: 46°08′04″N 9°07′15″E

Geography
- Location: Ticino, Switzerland; Lombardy, Italy
- Parent range: Lugano Prealps

The Motto della Tappa (also known as Cima Verta) is a mountain of the Lugano Prealps, located on the Swiss-Italian border.
