= Moto =

Moto or MOTO may refer to:

== Business ==
- Moto Hospitality, a chain of motorway service stations in the United Kingdom
- Moto Gold Mines, an exploration and mining company acquired by Randgold Resources
- Moto (restaurant), a restaurant in Chicago known for its "high-tech" food
- Motorola Mobility, whose nickname was "Moto" during the feature-phone era before the rise of smartphones when the company was a division of Motorola
  - Motorola Moto, a brand of smartphones and smartwatches manufactured by Motorola Mobility

== People ==
- Moto Hagio (born 1949), Japanese manga artist
- Moto Harada (born 1957), Japanese concert pianist and composer
- Moto (surname)

== Entertainment ==
- Mr. Moto, a fictional Japanese secret agent
- M.O.T.O. (short for Masters of the Obvious), a Chicago band
- Moto, one of the first two tribes featured in Survivor: Fiji
- Girls on Top (album), a 2005 album by BoA, reissued under the title Moto
- Moto Moto, a supporting character from the Madagascar franchise

== Sports ==
- Motocross, a form of off-road motorcycle racing consisting of races called motos
- MotoGP and its divisions Moto1, Moto2 and Moto3
- Moto Club de São Luís, a Brazilian football club
- Moto Esporte Clube, a Brazilian football club

== Other uses ==
- Moto, a genus of bugs in the tribe Harpactorini
- Moto (magazine), a Zimbabwean Catholic community newspaper
- Shorthand for a small motorcycle or moped
- Moto, a Central American and Peruvian incarnation of the auto rickshaw

== Acronyms ==
- MO/TO (Mail Order/Telephone Order) in card not present transaction processing

== See also ==
- Motomoto (disambiguation), including Moto-Moto
- Motto (disambiguation)
