= Carrozzeria Motto =

Italian coachbuilding company

Carrozzeria Motto was an Italian (Turin) coachbuilding company established in 1932 by Rocco Motto in Rivarossa before a move to Turin shortly after WW2. The company produced bodies from Cadillacs to Delahayes. In 1946, Motto commenced building aluminium bodies for Alfa Romeo, Fiat, Cisitalia, Bandini and Ermini. During 1963, Motto made a body for a Franco Scaglione-designed Porsche-Abarth 356 Carrera GTL berlinetta. He also bodied a handful of Ferraris.

A sample of the cars made by Carrozzeria Motto

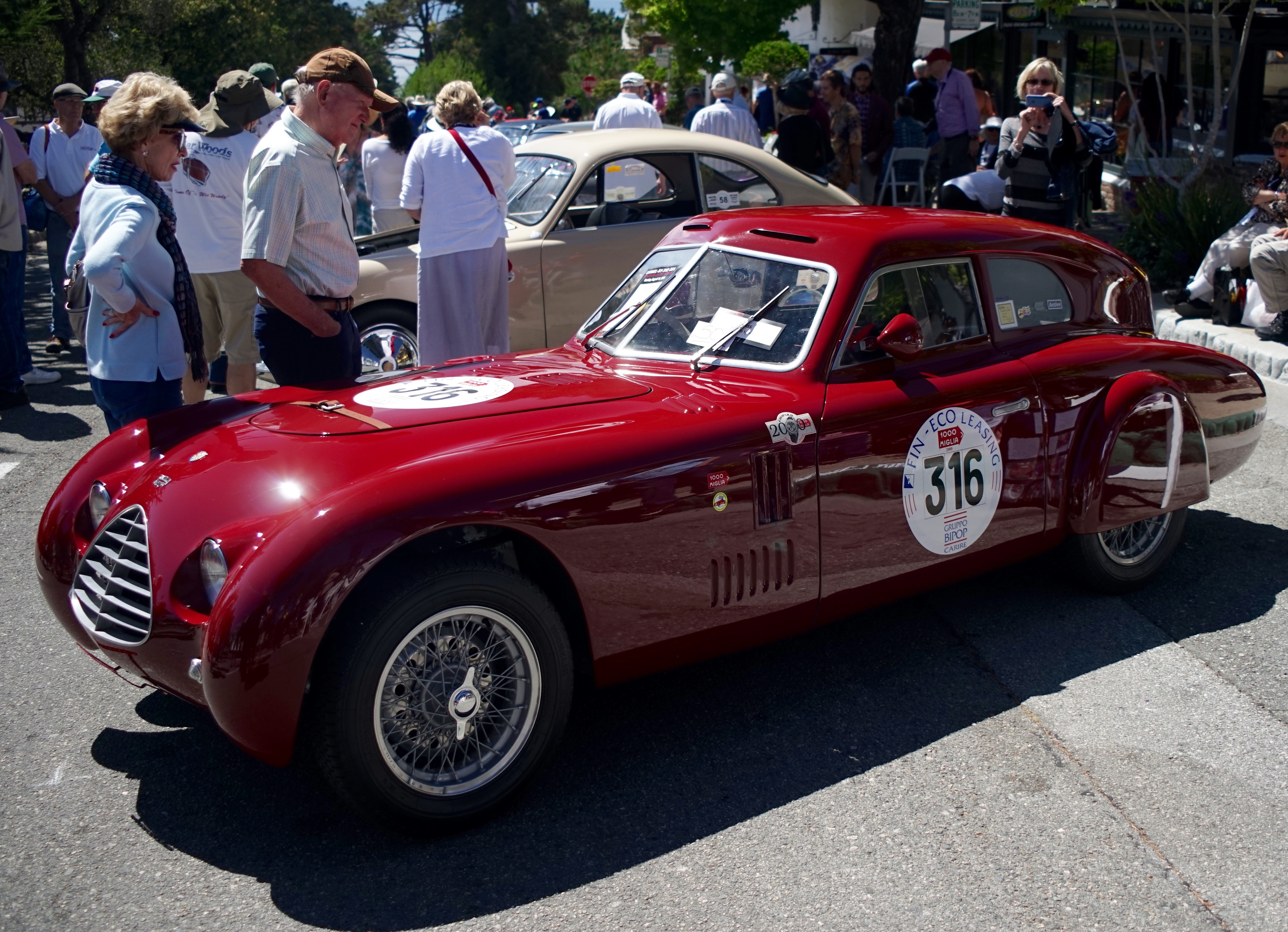
1947 Cisitalia 202 MM "Cassone" Berlinetta with bodywork by Rocco Motto

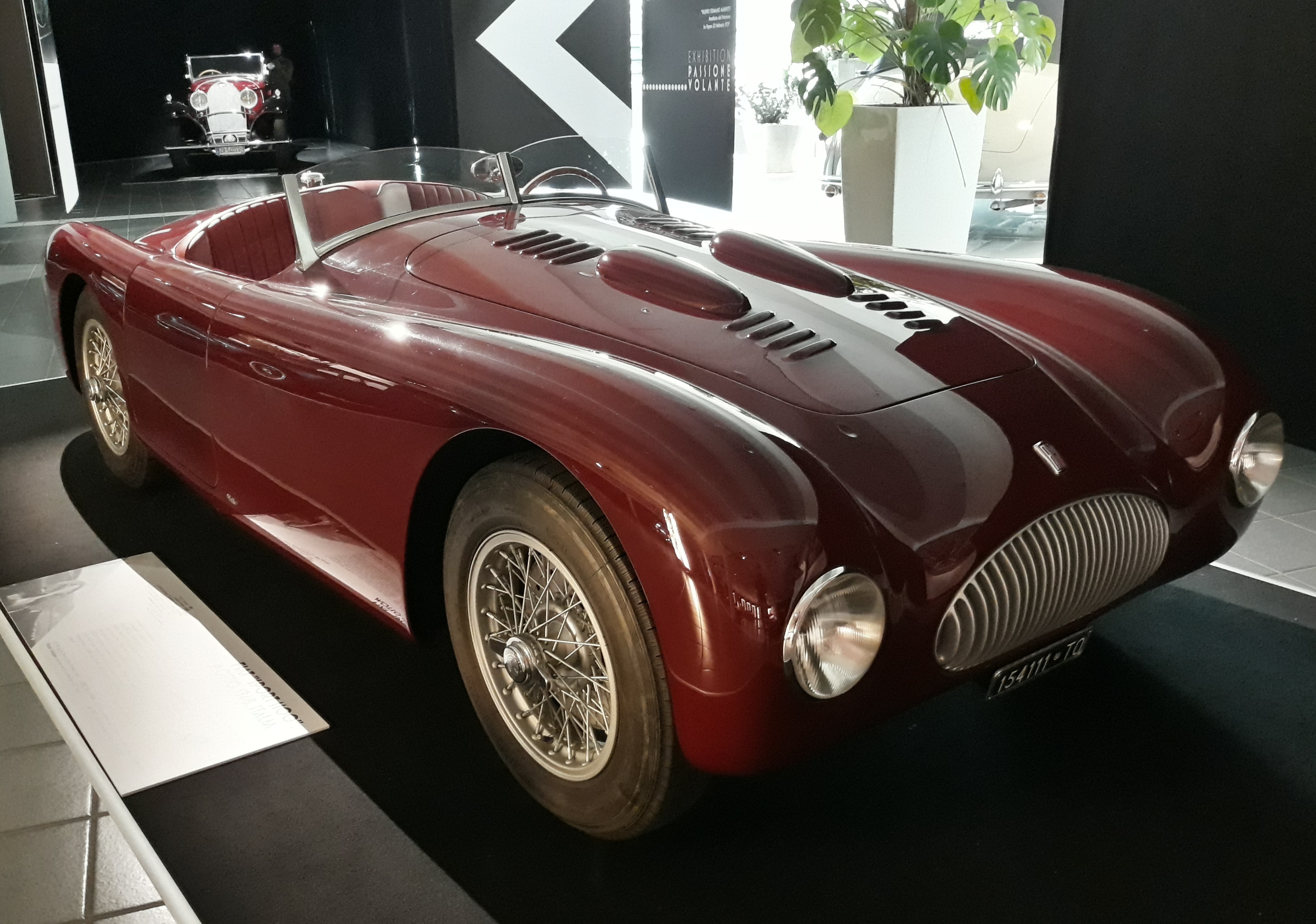
1948 FIAT 1100 with a barchetta style body by Rocco Motto

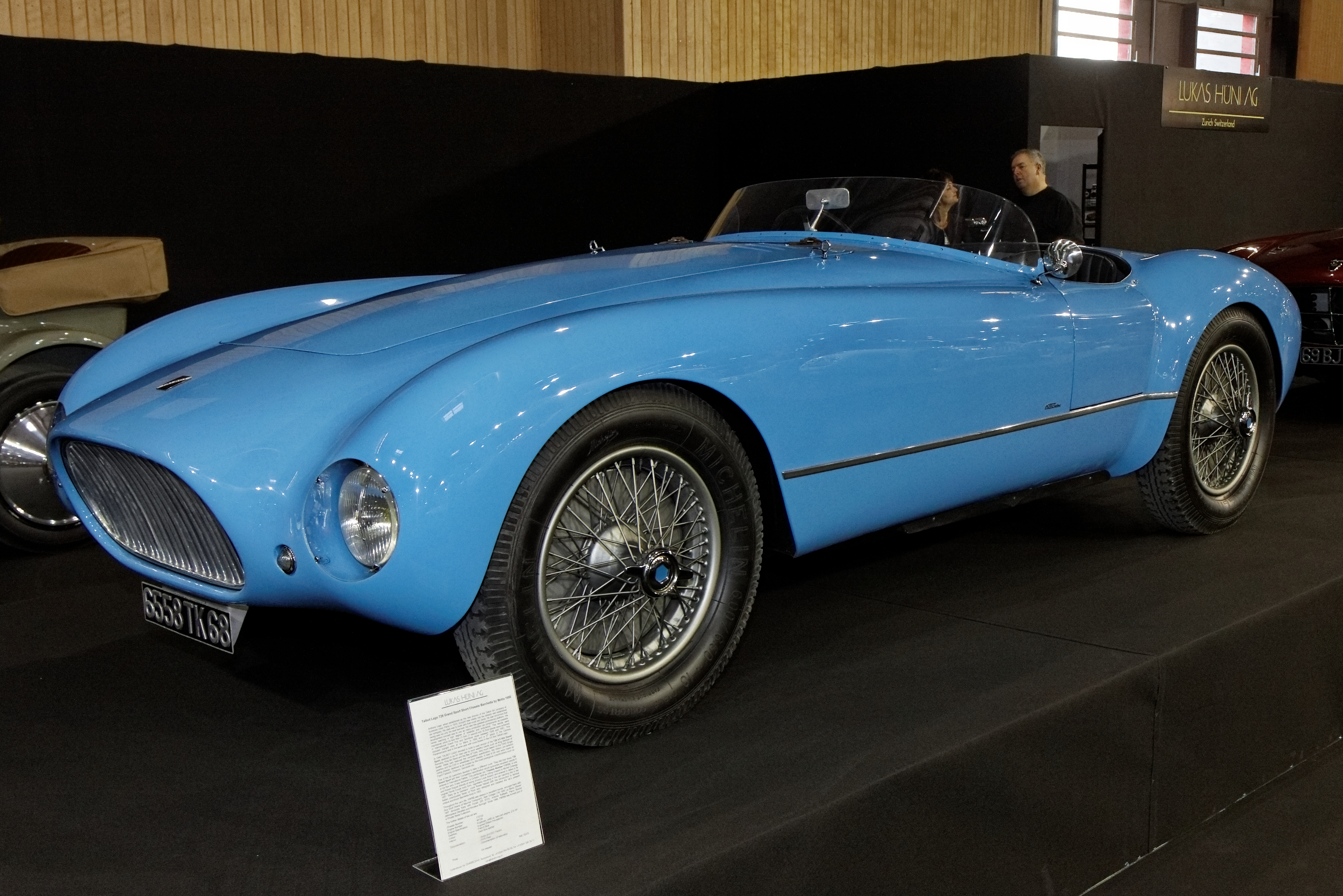
1950 Talbot Lago T26 Grand Sport Barchetta designed and built by Carrozzeria Motto

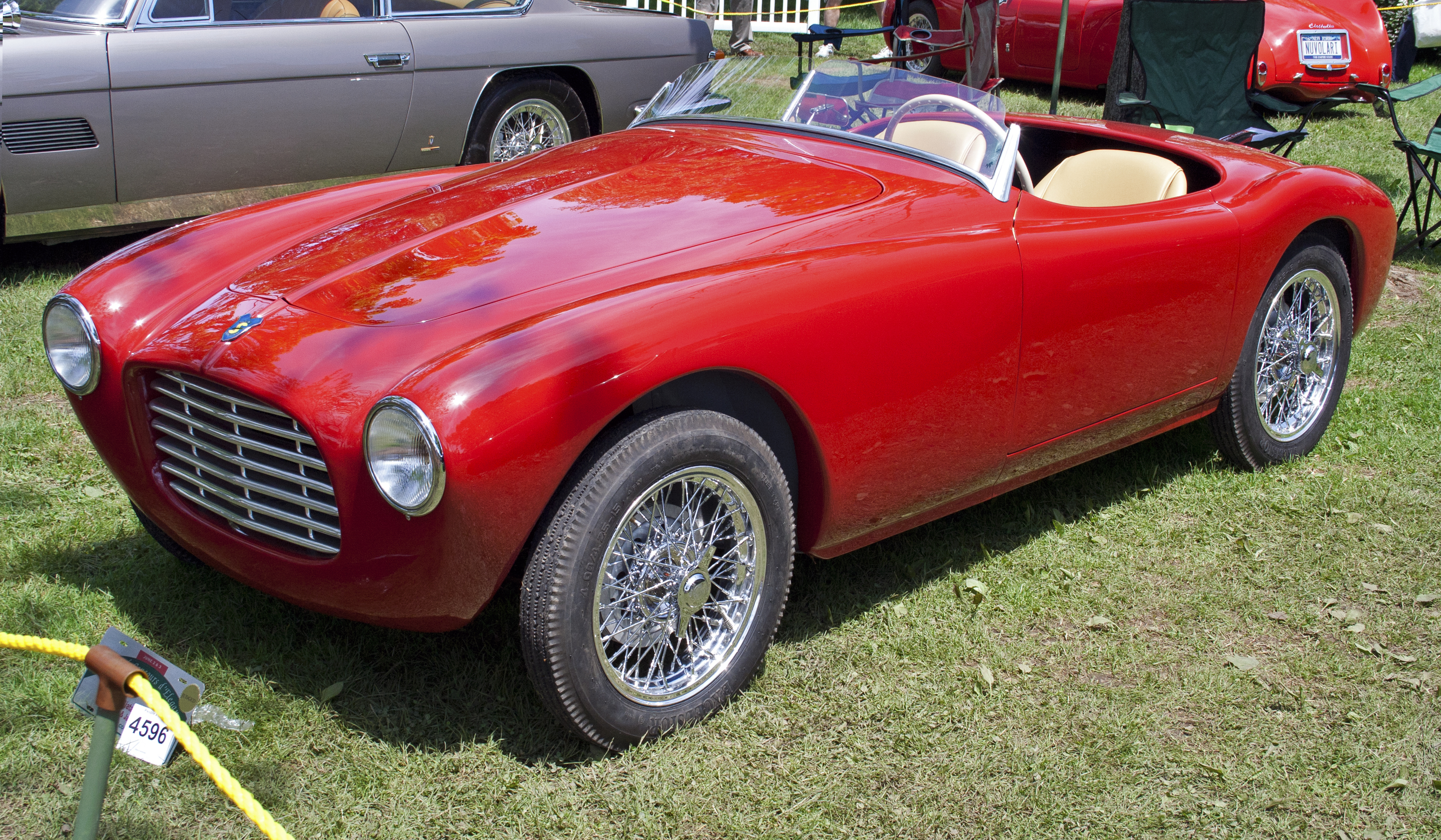
1952 SIATA 300 BC Barchetta Motto

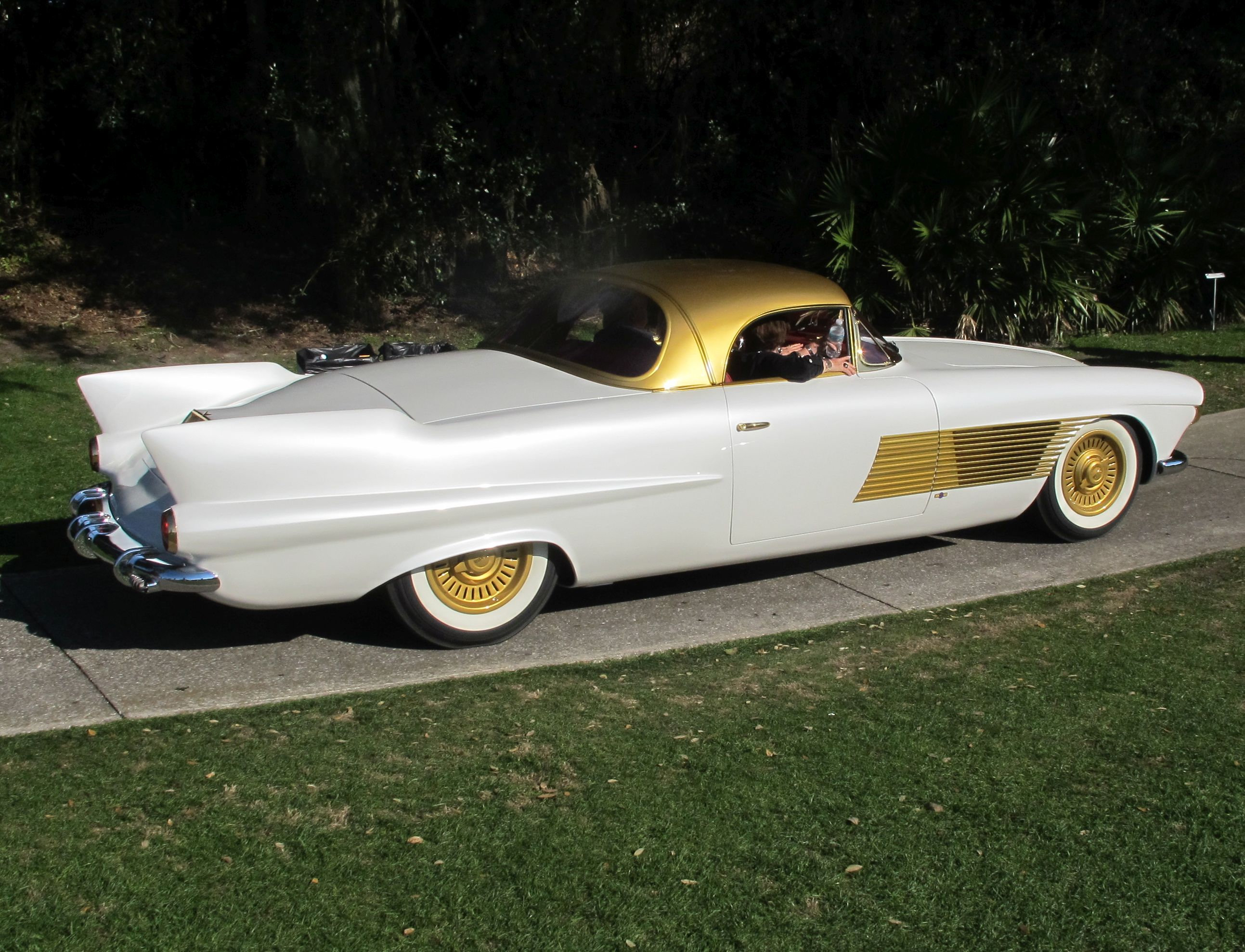
1955 Cadillac with a custom body by Carrozzeria Motto

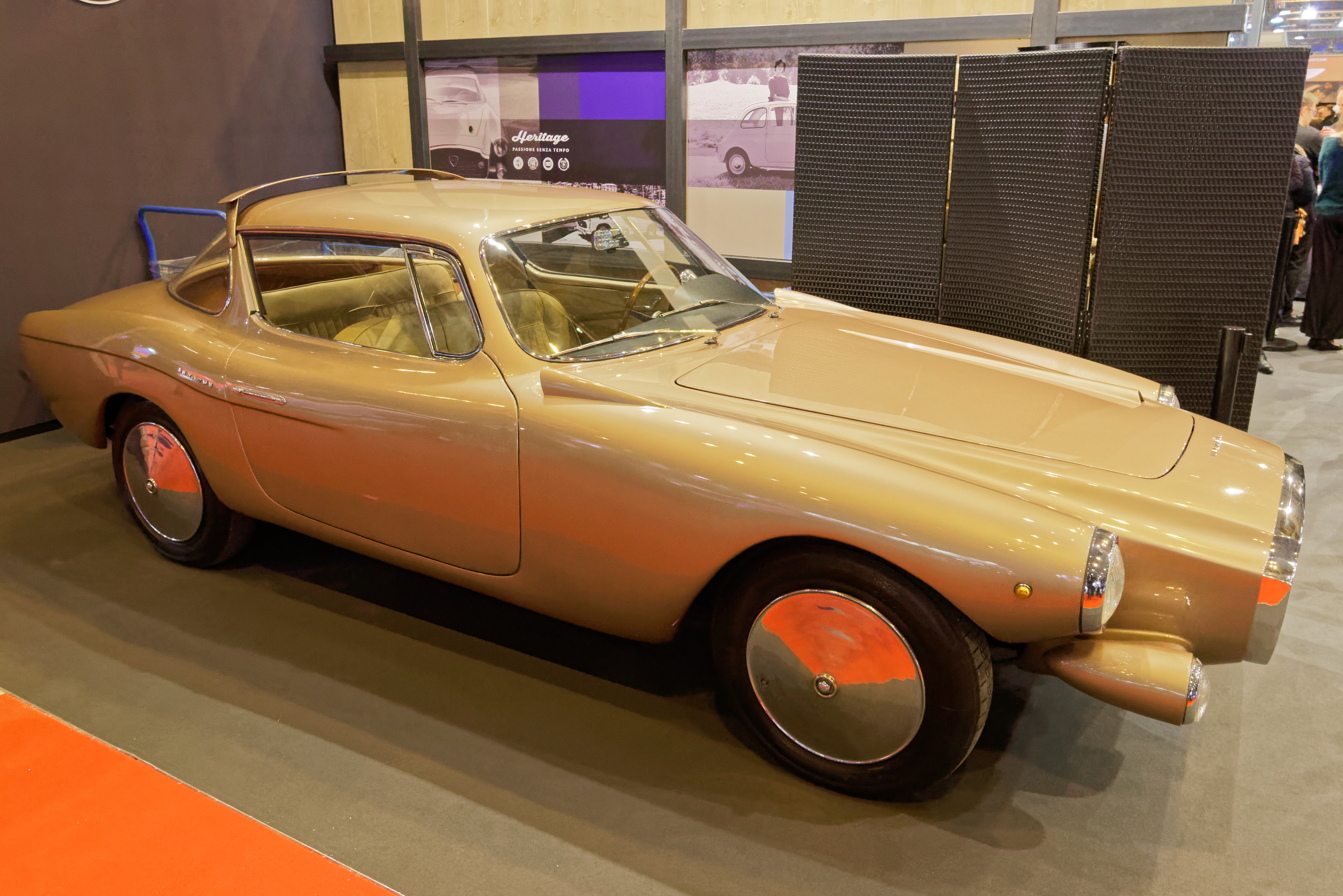
1960 Lancia Flaminia Loraymo, designed by Raymond Loewy and built by Rocco Motto
