= Mota (surname) =

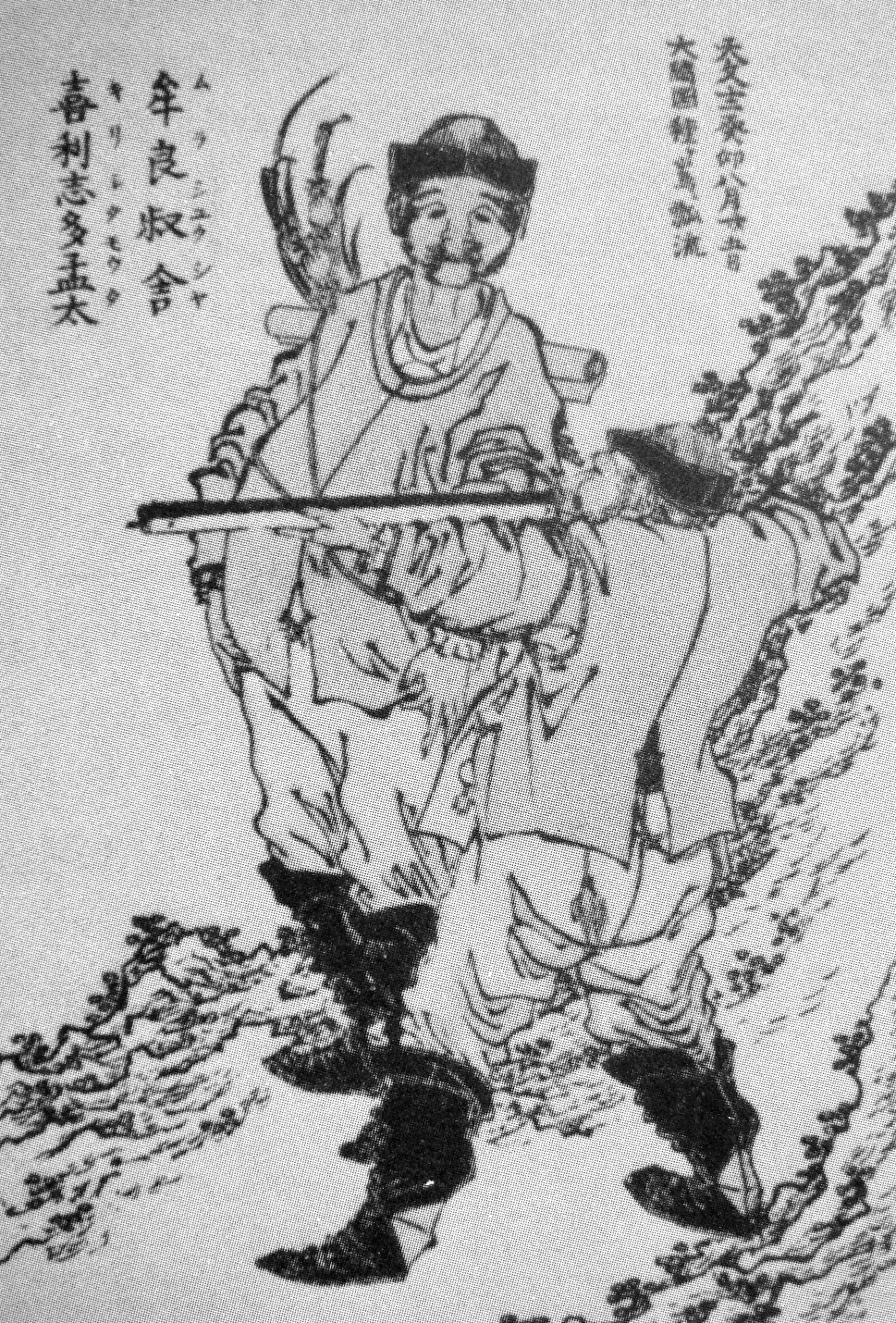
- António Mota, a Portuguese trader and explorer who, in the 16th century became one of the first Europeans to set foot in Japan.
- Language: Portuguese

Other names
- Variant forms: Mota, Motos, Cinos

Mota is a Portuguese and Spanish surname. The name is topographic, originally used for someone who lived near a fortified stronghold.

Mota has several versions including Motta (Italian) and Motte (French).

== Notable people ==
Notable people with the surname include:

- Aarón Padilla Mota (born 1977), Mexican footballer
- Adolfo Mota Hernández (born 1976), Mexican politician
- Agostinho José da Mota (1824–1878), Brazilian painter
- Altagracia Ugalde Mota (born 1971), Mexican singer-songwriter
- Ana Celia Mota (born 1935), Argentine-American physicist
- Andy Mota (born 1966), Dominican baseball player
- Antonio Mota (1939–1986), Mexican football goalkeeper
- António Mota (16th century), Portuguese trader and explorer
- António Mota (writer) (born 1957), Portuguese author
- Bernardo Mota (born 1971), Portuguese tennis player
- Bethany Mota (born 1995), American YouTuber
- Bruno da Mota Miranda (born 1995), Brazilian footballer
- Carlos de la Mota (born 1975), Dominican Actor, singer, and architect
- Carlos Mota Pinto (1936–1985), Portuguese professor and politician
- Daniel da Mota (born 1985), Luxembourgish footballer
- Danny Mota (born 1975), Dominican baseball player
- Dany Mota (born 1998), Luxembourgish footballer
- David Mota (born 1985), Spanish rugby player
- Emile Mota (born 1956), Congolese politician
- Erika Mota (born 1995), Dominican volleyball player
- Fabielle Mota (born 1978), Brazilian cyclist
- Feliciano de la Mota Botello (1769–1830), Argentine politician
- Germán Larrea Mota-Velasco (born 1941), Mexican businessman
- Gisela Mota Ocampo (1982–2016), Mexican politician
- Guillermo Mota (born 1973), Dominican baseball player
- Helder Mota Ricardo (born 1977), East Timorese footballer
- Hélder Mota (born 1992), Portuguese footballer
- Javi Mota (born 1984), Spanish singer, actor, dancer, and model
- Jean Mota (born 1993), Brazilian footballer
- João Pedro de Almeida Mota (1744–1817), Portuguese composer
- João Soares da Mota Neto (born 1980), Brazilian footballer
- Joaquim Magalhães Mota (1935–2007), Portuguese lawyer and politician
- José Mota (disambiguation), multiple people
- Josefina Vázquez Mota (born 1961), Mexican businesswoman and politician
- Juan Claudio de la Hoz y Mota (c. 1630 – c. 1710), Spanish dramatist
- Julie Mota (born 1978), Papua New Guinean writer, poet and artist
- Kimberly Altagracia Castillo Mota (born 1988), Dominican model
- Manny Mota (born 1938), Dominican baseball player
- Manuel de Regla Mota (1795–1864), Dominican politician
- Mariana Mota, Uruguayan judge
- Maria Manuel Mota (born 1971), Portuguese malariologist.
- Mario de Souza Mota (born 1958), Brazilian footballer
- Miraildes Maciel Mota (born 1978), Brazilian footballer known as Formiga
- Patrícia Mota (born 1982), Dominican actress and film producer
- Paulo Sérgio Mota (born 1991), Portuguese footballer
- Renan Mota (born 1991), Brazilian footballer
- Rosa Mota (born 1958), Portuguese marathon runner
- Salvador Mota (1922–1986), Mexican football goalkeeper
- Sérgio Mota (born 1989), Brazilian footballer
- Telmário Mota (born 1958), Brazilian politician and journalist
- Tiago Mota (disambiguation), multiple people
- Valdemar Mota (1906–1966), Portuguese footballer
- Walquir Mota (born 1967), Brazilian footballer

== See also ==
- Mota (disambiguation)
