= Mota =

Mota, MOTA or variations thereof may refer to:

== Geography ==
- Mota (island), Vanuatu
- Mota, Ethiopia, a town
- Mota, Gujarat, India, a town
- Mota, Ljutomer, Slovenia, a village

== Music ==
- M.O.T.A. (album), by Cultura Profética, 2005
- "Mota", a song by the Offspring from the album Ixnay on the Hombre, 1997

== People ==
- Mota (surname)
- Mota Alhouni (Motasem Alhouni, born 1992), Libyan professional pickleball player
- Mota Singh (1930–2016), British judge and the UK's first Asian judge
- Mota (footballer, born 1980), João Soares da Mota Neto, Brazilian football striker
- Mota (footballer, born 1985). Willis Mota Moreira, Brazilian football goalkeeper

== Other uses ==
- Mota language, the language spoken in the island of Mota
- Mota (butterfly), a genus of butterflies including Mota massyla
- MotA, a bacterial protein and gene
- MOTA (motorcycles), a German motorcycle brand
- Masters of the Air, a 2024 American war drama miniseries

== See also ==
- Motta (disambiguation)
