= Motta =

Motta may refer to:

== People ==
- Motta (surname)
- nickname of Mordechai Gur (1930–1995), Israeli politician, lieutenant general and the 10th Chief of Staff of the Israel Defense Forces
- Motta Navas (born 1966), Indian serial killer

== Other uses ==
- Motta, Graubünden, a settlement in Brusio, Graubünden, Switzerland
- Battle of Motta (1412), fought at Motta di Livenza, Italy

== See also ==
- Mota (disambiguation)
- Motta Baluffi, a municipality of Cremona, Italy
- Motta Camastra, a municipality of Messina, Italy
- Motta d'Affermo, a municipality of Messina, Italy
- Motta de' Conti, a municipality of Vercelli, Italy
- Motta di Livenza, a municipality of Treviso, Italy
- Motta Montecorvino, a municipality of Foggia, Italy
- Motta San Giovanni, a municipality of Reggio Calabria, Italy
- Motta Santa Lucia, a municipality of Catanzaro, Italy
- Motta Sant'Anastasia, a municipality of Catania, Italy
- Motta Visconti, a municipality of Milan, Italy
- Motta Vigana, a civil parish of Massalengo, Italy
