= Tribute to the Legend: Bob Marley =

Live album by Cultura Profética
- Released: May 8, 2007
- Recorded: February 4, 2006 in San Juan, Puerto Rico
- Genre: Reggae
- Label: Machete Music

Cultura Profética chronology
M.O.T.A. (2005)	Tribute to the Legend: Bob Marley (2007)	La Dulzura (2010)

Tribute to the Legend: Bob Marley is an album by the Puerto Rican reggae band, Cultura Profética. The album is a live performance of a tribute the band held to Jamaican reggae singer Bob Marley.

The album was recorded on February 4, 2006, at the Tito Puente Amphitheatre in San Juan, Puerto Rico, and was released on May 8, 2007.

== Production ==
As a reggae band, Cultura Profética have always been fans of Bob Marley's music. This is noted in their performance of Marley's songs (or adaptations of them) in some of their previous albums. On their second album, Ideas Nuevas, they performed a cover of "So Much Trouble". The song "Bieke", featured on their third studio album, Diario, is an adaptation of "Zimbabwe".

Since the early 2000s, the band has performed several tribute concerts to Marley. However, this time they decided to record it and release it as a homage to the Jamaican singer. The track listing follows closely the one from Legend, Marley's best known hit collection. On previous tributes, the band had performed some more obscure songs from Marley, but this time they wanted the audience to fully join in.

For this album, usual singer Willy Rodríguez passed the microphone to the band's drummer and vocalist Boris Bilbraut. According to Rodríguez, Bilbraut's voice is closer to Marley's. Bilbraut has been the lead singer of some of the band's songs.

== Track listing ==
=== Disc 1: CD ===
1. "Is This Love" – 4:38
2. "Buffalo Soldier" – 4:36
3. "Positive Vibration" – 5:03
4. "Natural Mystic" – 4:30
5. "No Woman, No Cry" – 6:48
6. "Slogans" – 4:05
7. "Exodus" – 6:27
8. "Redemption Song" – 5:43
9. "Easy Skankin'" – 4:46
10. "Small Axe" – 5:50
11. "Pimper's Paradise" – 4:16
12. "Rat Race" – 4:29
13. "Get Up, Stand Up" – 9:42

=== Disc 2: DVD ===
1. "Is This Love"
2. "Buffalo Soldier"
3. "Positive Vibration"
4. "Natural Mystic"
5. "No Woman, No Cry"
6. "Slogans"
7. "Exodus"
8. "Redemption Song"
9. "Easy Skankin'"
10. "Small Axe"
11. "Pimper's Paradise"
12. "Rat Race"
13. "Get Up, Stand Up"

== Musicians ==
- Willy Rodríguez - bass guitar, background vocals
- Boris Bilbraut - drums, lead vocals
- Omar Silva – Electric guitar
- Juan Quinones - Trumpet
- Victor Vazquez - Trombone
- Eliut Gonzalez - Guitar
- Eggie Santiago - Piano
- Kalani Trinidad - Sax, Flute
- Jahaziel Garcia - Trumpet
- Adriana Betancourt - Singer
