= Cultura =

Cultura is the word for culture in several languages. It may refer to:

== Media ==
- TV Cultura
- NPO Cultura, the former name of Dutch television channel NPO 2 Extra
- Rai Cultura, a division of the Italian public broadcaster Rai

== Other uses ==
- Cultura (journal), a biannual peer-reviewed academic journal which covers philosophical work
- Cultura (album), album by Breed 77
- Cultura en Vivo, live album by the Puerto Rican reggae band Cultura Profética
- La Cultura metro station, a station in Lima, Peru
