= Motta (surname) =

Motta is an Italian surname. The Portuguese and Spanish version is Mota, while the French version is Motte. Notable people with the surname include:

- Afonso Motta (born 1950), Brazilian politician
- Angelo Motta (1890–1957), Italian businessman and politician
- Bess Motta (born 1958), American actress and singer
- Carlos Carmelo Vasconcellos Motta (1890–1982), Brazilian Catholic cardinal
- Cássio Motta (born 1960) Brazilian professional tennis player
- Dick Motta (born 1931), American basketball coach
- Ed Motta (born 1971), Brazilian musician
- Edoardo Motta (born 2005), Italian footballer
- Elena Motta (born 2000), Guatemalan politician
- Fernanda Motta (born 1981), Brazilian model and actress
- Francesco Motta (born 1986), Italian singer-songwriter
- Gianni Motta (born 1943), Italian bicycle racer
- Giuseppe Motta (1871–1940), Swiss politician
- Giuseppe Motta (aviator) (died 1929), Italian World War I fighter pilot and seaplane air racer
- José Vianna da Motta (Sometimes spelt Mota, 1868–1948), Portuguese composer and pianist
- Luiz Carlos Motta (born 1959), Brazilian Deputy
- Marcelo Ramos Motta (1931–1987), Brazilian writer
- Marco Aurelio Motta (born 1960), Brazilian volleyball coach
- Marco Motta (born 1986), Italian footballer
- Mauricio Motta Gomes, Brazilian martial artist
- Paulo César Motta (born 1982), Guatemalan football goalkeeper
- Ramon Motta (born 1988), Brazilian footballer
- Stalin Motta (born 1984), Colombian footballer
- Simone Motta (born 1977), Italian footballer
- Thiago Motta (born 1982), Brazilian-born Italian footballer
- Zeke Motta (born 1990), American football player
- Zezé Motta (born 1944), Brazilian actress and singer
