= Cultura en Vivo =

Live album by Cultura Profética
- Released: June 19, 2001
- Recorded: May 12, 2000
- Studio: Tito Puente Amphitheatre in San Juan, Puerto Rico
- Genre: Reggae
- Length: 1:18:05
- Label: Luar Music

Cultura Profética chronology
Ideas Nuevas (2001)	Cultura en Vivo (2001)	Diario (2002)

Professional ratings
Review scores
Source	Rating
AllMusic	(not rated)

Cultura en Vivo is the first live album by the Puerto Rican reggae band, Cultura Profética. It was recorded on May 12, 2000, at the Tito Puente Amphitheatre in San Juan, Puerto Rico, and released on June 19, 2001.

== Track listing ==
All tracks by Cultura Profética except where noted.

1. "Mr. Swin' y el Tres Pasitos Jazz Ensemble" – 4:07
2. "Suelta los Amarres" – 6:37
3. Medley Canción de Alerta: Enyoyando/Con Truenos Hay Que Hablar/Despertar/Lucha y Sacrificio/Por Qué Cantamos/Tempestad Tranquila/Population Disorder/Filitustrein" – 17:26
4. "La Otra Galaxia" – 2:37
5. "Ideas Nuevas" – 6:17
6. "Funkadera" – 9:29
7. "Advertencia" – 7:40
8. "No Me Busques" – 6:25
9. "Pasiones, Guerrillas y Muerte" – 5:22
10. "Fruto de la Tierra" – 6:33
11. "Ya No Hay" (Guillermo Bonetto, Cafress, Adrián Canedo) (feat. Los Cafres) – 5:25

== Personnel ==
=== Musicians ===
- Errol Brown – mixing
- Los Cafres – performer
- William Cepeda – trombone, caracoles
- Frank Cesarano – mastering
- Alex Diaz – photography
- Eduardo Fernandez – trombone
- Gallego – liner notes
- Raúl López – executive producer
- Thomas Pearson – guitar
- Raffi Torres – trombone
- Juan V. – assistant

=== Production ===
- Produced by Willy Rodríguez, Eliut González, Iván Gutiérrez, Boris Bilbraut, Omar Silva
- Executive producers – Luar Music and Cultura Profética
- Recorded May 12, 2000 at the Tito Puente Amphitheatre in San Juan, Puerto Rico
- mixed at Circle House, Miami, Florida
- mix engineer – Errol Brown
