= Tiago Mota =

Tiago Mota may refer to:

- Tiago José Bico Mota (born 1985), Portuguese football player, midfielder
- Tiago André Ramos da Mota (born 1987), Portuguese football player, goalkeeper
