= Cultura Profética =

Puerto Rican reggae band formed in 1996

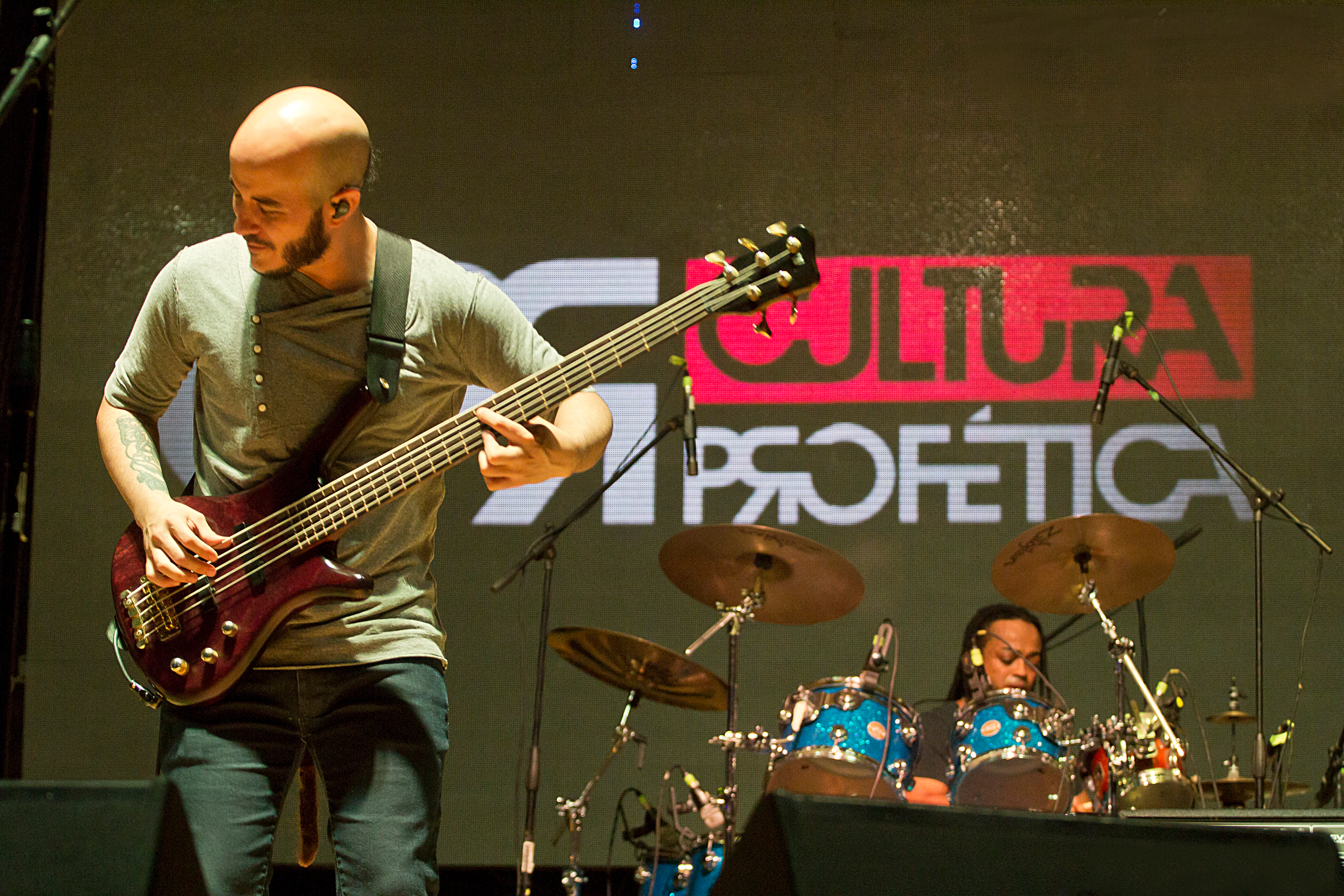
- Cultura Profética band members Willy Rodríguez (left) and Boris Bilbraut (right) performing in Nicaragua on February 16, 2013

Background information
- Origin: Puerto Rico
- Genres: Reggae en Español, reggae, roots reggae
- Years active: 1996–present
- Label: Rimas
- Website: culturaprofetica.com (in Spanish)

Cultura Profética (in English, Prophetic Culture) is a Puerto Rican reggae band formed in 1996. The band has undergone several lineup changes, but founding members Willy Rodríguez (bass guitar, vocals), Eliut González (guitar), and Omar Silva (guitar, bass guitar) have remained in the group throughout its history. Despite primarily performing reggae music, Cultura Profética has experimented with genres such as bossa nova, tango, jazz, and salsa. Lyrically, the group discusses socio-political and ecological issues including Latin American identity and environmental concerns, as well as interpersonal relationships and love.

After gaining popularity in Puerto Rico as a cover band, Cultura Profética began performing original music and released its debut album, Canción de Alerta, in 1996. The group followed up with Ideas Nuevas in 2000, which featured further musical experimentation with a wider variety of musical styles, and then Diario in 2004. After relocating to Mexico, the band released M.O.T.A. in 2005, which peaked at number 12 on the Billboard Hot Latin Albums chart. In 2010, Cultura Profética released La Dulzura, which took a more romantic lyrical focus and produced the radio hit "La Complicidad". In recent years, Cultura Profética has released the singles "Saca, Prende y Sorprende" (2014), "Le Da Igual" (2015), and "Musica Sin Tiempo" (2017). The group released their most recent album, En Bucle, in June 2026.

== History ==
=== 1996–99: Formation and Canción de Alerta ===
Cultura Profética originally began as a cover band, performing popular reggae songs in small bars and clubs before beginning to perform original music in Spanish. Shortly after transitioning to perform original music, the group adopted the name Cultura Profética, which was inspired by the view that "music is a voice of culture and is prophetic because the reggae music that we love, and that influenced us, is from the '70s with themes of what's happening now that can affect our future", according to guitarist/bassist Omar Silva.

Many of the original members of the group attended the Escuela Elemental and the Escuela Secundaria of the University of Puerto Rico, an institution noted for its progressive and experimental teaching approaches. Vocalist/bassist Willy Rodriguez commented, "It is a school in which you are allowed to decide a few things on your own, you have free time between classes [when] you can do your own things, and there is a lot of musical culture in the school. It tends to allow you to explore your artistic interests ... There was always an air of liberation, of thinking on your own. I think that influenced a lot in what we do today musically and ideologically." Group members Boris Bilbraut, Willy Rodríguez, Eliut González, Juan Costa, and Ivan Gutiérres began jamming together in 1996, bonding over a shared interest in reggae music, particularly Bob Marley. These rehearsal sessions took place in El Hoyo, a neighborhood in the San Juan metropolitan area.

After transitioning away from being a cover band, the group quickly gained popularity in the Puerto Rican reggae scene. Cultura Profética began performing in major reggae festivals and opening for Jamaican reggae musician Don Carlos. The band's first album, Canción de Alerta (1998), was recorded in the Tuff Gong studios at Jamaica with Errol Brown, frontman of Hot Chocolate and Bob Marley's sound engineer. The group was the first Spanish-language act to record in Marley's studios. The record discusses a number of social issues in Puerto Rico, including the importance of acknowledging the island's African influence.

=== 1998–2009: Ideas Nuevas, Diario, and M.O.T.A. ===
Cultura Profética "De Antes" (2002)
The song "De Antes" from Diario (2002). The song makes use of the moog synthesizer and exemplifies the band's mellow, atmospheric reggae sound.

The group returned to Tuff Gong studios in 1999 to record its second album, Ideas Nuevas, which was released in May 2000. On this record, the band began experimenting with a variety of rhythms such as bossa nova, salsa, ska, and jazz. The album was dedicated to a music instructor at the University of Puerto Rico. The band performed in Tito Puente's amphitheater on May 12, 2000, later releasing a recording of the performance in the form of the live album Cultura en Vivo. In 2002, the band released its third studio album, Diario. On this album, the band aimed to produce a record that represents Puerto Rican daily life, occasionally introducing songs with interludes of casual conversations and background noise, exemplified by songs such as "De Antes" and "Pa'l Tanama".

In 2004, Cultura Profetica began to focus on the international stage, eventually moving temporarily to Mexico. Their fourth studio album, M.O.T.A., was released in October 2005 after a tour through Mexico. M.O.T.A peaked at number 12 on the Billboard Hot Latin Albums chart, remaining at the position for two weeks. Also in 2005, the group collaborated with Puerto Rican rapper Vico C on his song "Te Me Puedo Escapar" from his album Desahogo. In January 2006, the song "Ritmo Que Pesa" from M.O.T.A peaked at number 35 on the Billboard Latin Pop Songs chart. In 2007, the group released Tribute to the Legend: Bob Marley, a live recording of the group performing Bob Marley songs. After the release of the tribute album, Cultura Profética toured extensively through Latin America and expanded its fan base, particularly in Argentina. A DVD covering their performance at Jose Miguel Agrelot Coliseum was released in late summer of 2008.

=== 2010–present: La Dulzura and Sobrevolando ===
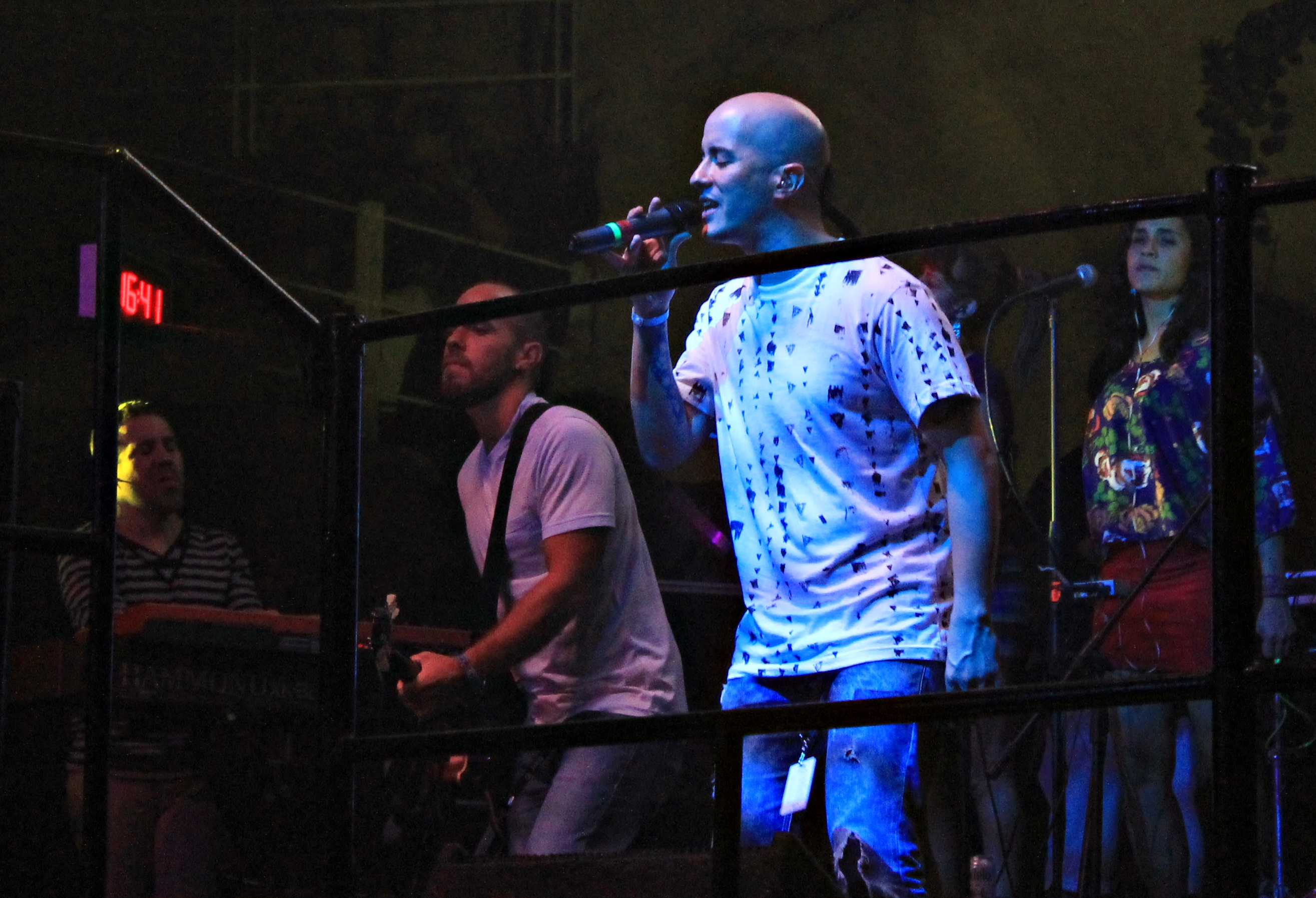
Cultura Profética performing in Cancún in November 2011

In 2010, Cultura Profética released La Dulzura, the group's first album on its own record label, La Mafafa. While discussing the decision to create an independent record label, Rodríguez explained "I can't deny we spoke with different labels, but we didn't find anything favorable. Labels are going through tough times and we decided to brave it on our own." Many of the songs on the album were written and performed during the band's extensive touring beginning in 2007, and the songs went through numerous transformations during this time. Before the album's official release, the band posted songs on the internet, including "La Complicidad", which became a radio hit in Puerto Rico. La Dulzura debuted at number five on Billboard's Top Latin Albums Chart.

La Dulzura represented a stylistic departure for the group, both musically and lyrically. The song "Del Tope al Fondo" is influenced by Argentine music, especially the genre of tango. Lyrically, the band discusses more romantic themes as opposed to the political emphasis of the group's previous records. Guitarist Eliut Gonzalez remarked that the band aimed to shift discussion to "the good things in the world", explaining that "We know that people need help, and that behind every revolution or movement, there is love. We wanted to document that in our music, but without doing it in a cheesy or typical way." The singles "Baja la Tensión", "La Complicidad", "Para Estar" and "Ilegal" all charted on the Billboard Latin Pop Songs chart. In 2011, the group collaborated with Dominican musician Vicente García on his single "Mi Balcón".

The group's single "Saca, Prende y Sorprende", released in 2014, pays homage to Jamaican deejay and rapper Super Cat and advocates for the legalization of marijuana. Gonzalez describes the band's upcoming record as "very different" from La Dulzura, noting that the group began working on new material while on tour approximately a year after the album's release. In March 2017, the group released the single "Musica Sin Tiempo", which is a celebration of "what music represents for them in their daily lives".

On November 1, 2019, the band released the album Sobrevolando, which debuted at number two on the Billboard Reggae Albums Chart. Rodríguez also collaborated with reggaeton artist Ozuna on the song "Temporal" from his album Nibiru, released November 29, 2019. In March 2020, Cultura Profética collaborated with American singer John Legend and Mexican-American mariachi group Flor De Toloache on the single "Quisiera". The song, written by Dominican bachata artist Juan Luis Guerra, contains influences of reggae, soul, and mariachi.

== Style and lyrical themes ==
Cultura Profética has been described as roots reggae. The group has often made use of the moog synthesizer, an instrument commonly used in traditional reggae but is generally rare in contemporary reggae. Despite primarily performing reggae music, the group incorporates various other rhythms into its compositions, including those of Caribbean genres such as salsa. The song "Reggae Rústico" from Ideas Nuevas includes an extended soneo, an improvised call-and-response section common in the salsa genre, at its closing, calling for unity in reggae music. Additionally, the band's music features a strong emphasis on improvisation and polyrhythmic patterns. Rodríguez notes that "We've developed what I think is our own genre. We don't consider ourselves a pop act but we do make popular music in the sense that we are supported by many people. People have finally understood what we do." Leila Cobo of Billboard observed elements of jazz in the single "La Complicidad," additionally describing it as "more mellow rock than reggae."

Lyrically, the group addresses social issues including corruption, environmentalism, personal liberty, and Latin American identity. Canción de Alerta contains the song "Por qué cantamos," an adaptation of Uruguayan writer Mario Benedetti's poem of the same name. Author Eunice Rojas cites this as an example of the group using "the power of music to advance social causes." The song "Suelta Los Amarres" from Ideas Nuevas discourages listeners from using violence to advance a political cause. However, the lyrics on La Dulzura place more emphasis on interpersonal relationships and love. Silva notes that the group refrains from writing "romantic" lyrics, noting that "romanticism has a connotation of suffering for love. We are talking about the love that elevates and purifies your soul. We are talking in the sense of the love that sets you free."

== Discography ==
=== Studio albums ===
- Canción de Alerta (1998)
- Ideas Nuevas (1999)
- Diario (2002)
- M.O.T.A. (2005)
- La Dulzura (2010)
- Sobrevolando (2019)
- En bucle (2026)

=== Live albums ===
- Cultura en Vivo (2001)
- En Vivo via Facebook (2011)
- 15 Aniversario el el Luna Park (2012)

=== Tribute albums ===
- Tribute to the Legend: Bob Marley (2007)

== Band members ==
=== Current members ===
- Willy Rodríguez—Bass guitar, Lead Vocals
- Omar Silva—Guitar, Bass guitar
- Juanqui Sulsona—Piano, Keyboards
- Eliut González—Guitar
- Eggie Santiago—Organ, Keyboards
- Ernesto Rodríguez—Percussion
- Patricia Lewis—Vocals
- Adrianna Betancourt—Vocals
- Victor Vázquez—Trombone
- Kalani Trinidad—Flute & Saxophone
- Jahaziel García—Trumpet

=== Former members ===
- Boris Bilbraut; percussion
- Iván Gutiérrez—piano, brass arrangements
- Sergio Orellana—keyboards, organ
- Melvin Villanueva—piano
- Juan Costa—rhythm guitar
- Raúl Gaztambide—organ
- Danny Ramírez - keyboard, organ
- Eduardo Fernández—trombone
- Javier Joglar—tenor saxophone, flute
- Luis Rafael Torres—tenor saxophone, alto saxophone, flute
- Juan José "Cheo" Quiñones—trumpet
- María Soledad Gaztambide—vocals
- Yarimir Cabán, better known professionally as Mima—vocals
- Eduardo "Edo" Sanz—drums, percussion
- Omar Cruz—percussion
- Beto Torrens, Juansi—percussion
- Bayrex Jiménez—piano, keyboards
- Ilan Ilang Gutierrez - vocals

== Bibliography ==
- Rojas, Eunice, ed. (October 8, 2013). Sounds of Resistance: The Role of Music in Multicultural Activism. Praeger. ISBN 978-0-313-39805-6.
