= Andrea Villagrán =

Guatemalan economist and politician

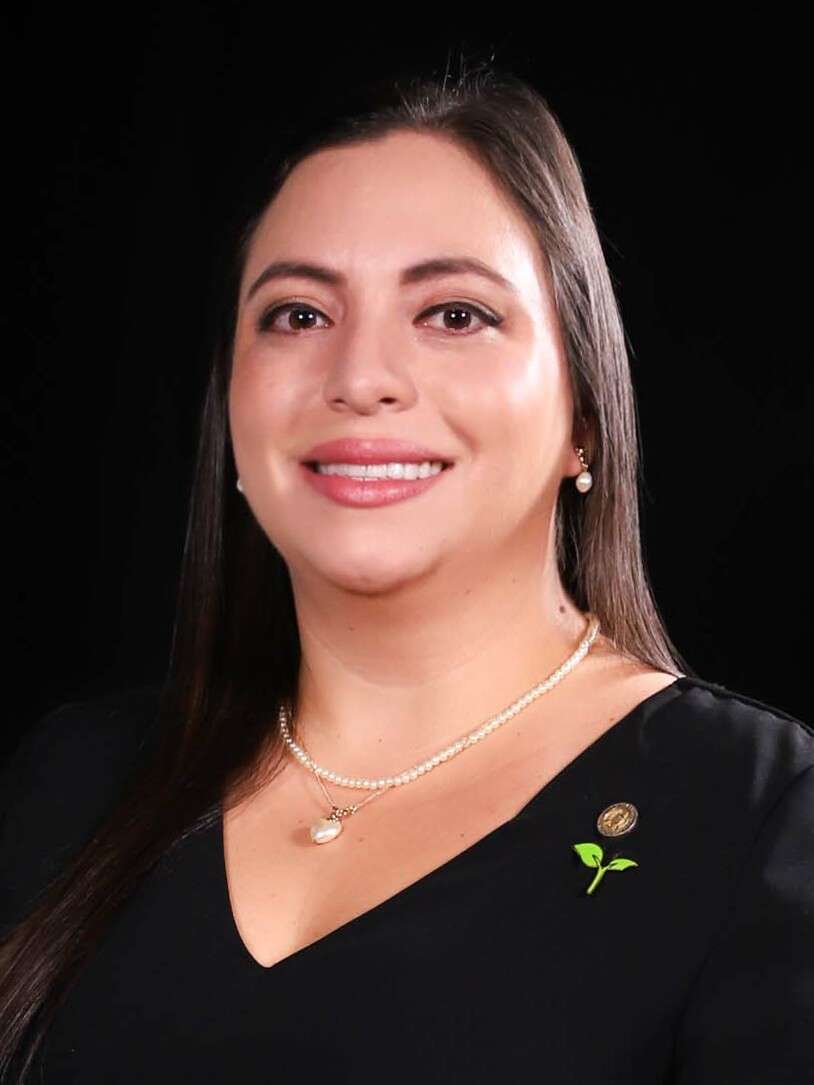
- Official portrait, 2024

First Secretary of the Congress of Guatemala
- In office 14 January 2024 – 19 January 2024
- President: Samuel Pérez Álvarez
- Preceded by: Mynor Mejía Popol
- Succeeded by: Karina Paz

Member of the Congress of Guatemala
- Incumbent
- Assumed office 5 September 2017
- Constituency: Guatemala (2017–2024); Guatemala City (2024–present)

Personal details
- Born: 2 January 1992 (age 34) Guatemala City
- Party: Roots
- Other political affiliations: Semilla (since 2022)
- Education: Rafael Landívar University

Andrea Beatriz Villagrán Antón (born 2 January 1992) is a Guatemalan politician who has been serving as a member of Congress since September 2017. Villagrán took office at age 25, she was the youngest woman to serve in the Guatemalan Congress until the election of Elena Motta Kolleff in 2023.
