= La Dulzura =

Studio album by Cultura Profética
- Released: August 22, 2010
- Recorded: Playbach Studio, San Juan, Puerto Rico
- Genre: Reggae
- Length: 56:32
- Label: La Mafafa

Cultura Profética chronology
Tribute to the Legend: Bob Marley (2007)	La Dulzura (2010)	Sobrevolando (2019)

La Dulzura is the fifth studio album by Puerto Rican reggae band Cultura Profética, released in 2010. The title of the album literally means "The Sweetness" in Spanish.

== Album information ==
=== Background ===
In 2010, Cultura Profética released La Dulzura, the group's first album on its own record label, La Mafafa. While discussing the decision to create an independent record label, Rodríguez explained "I can't deny we spoke with different labels, but we didn't find anything favorable. Labels are going through tough times and we decided to brave it on our own." Many of the songs on the album were written and performed during the band's extensive touring beginning in 2007, and the songs went through numerous transformations during this time. Before the album's official release, the band posted songs on the internet, including "La Complicidad," which became a radio hit in Puerto Rico and Latin America. La Dulzura debuted at number five on Billboard's Top Latin Albums Chart.

=== Music and lyrics ===
La Dulzura represented a stylistic departure for the group, both musically and lyrically. The song "Del Tope al Fondo" is influenced by Argentine music, especially the genre of tango. Lyrically, the band discusses more romantic themes as opposed to the political emphasis of the group's previous records. Guitarist Eliut Gonzalez remarked that the band aimed to shift discussion to "the good things in the world," explaining that "We know that people need help, and that behind every revolution or movement, there is love. We wanted to document that in our music, but without doing it in a cheesy or typical way." La Dulzura contains some of the group's most popular songs, including "Baja la Tensión," "La Complicidad, "Para Estar", "Ilegal" & More

== Track listing ==
No.	Title	Writer(s)	Length
1.	"Rimas pa' Seducir"	Rodriguez	3:07
2.	"La Complicidad"	Rodriguez	6:03
3.	"Amante Luz"	Barreras, Silva	5:10
4.	"Para Estar"	Colon, Gonzalez, Rodriguez, Silva	4:56
5.	"En la Oscuridad"	Rodriguez, Silva	4:33
6.	"Baja la Tensión"	Gonzalez, Rodriguez, Sulsona	4:27
7.	"Ilegal"	Gonzalez, Rodriguez, Silva	5:04
8.	"Somos Muchos"	Bilbraut, Dávila, Gonzalez, Silva	4:44
9.	"Del Tope al Fondo"	Rodriguez, Silva, Sulsona	5:06
10.	"Me Faltabas Tú"	Mendez	2:52
11.	"Verso Terso"	Rodriguez	6:05
12.	"La Espera"	Rodriguez	4:25

== Charts ==
Chart performance for La Dulzura
Chart (2010)	Peak position
US Independent Albums (Billboard)	37
US Latin Pop Albums (Billboard)	4
US Top Latin Albums (Billboard)	5
