= MOTA (motorcycles) =

MOTA was a motorcycle brand created by MOTA Maschinenbau GmbH in Nagold, Baden-Württemberg.

== History ==
MOTRA Maschinenbau was founded in 1946 in Nagold by Wolfgang Schlegel, an amateur pilot and constructor. At first, the company manufactured different components for the automotive and mechanical engineering industries in Germany. In 1950 MOTRA renamed the company to MOTA Maschinenbau GmbH and also enlarged the production of components: motorcycle engines, mopeds, lightweight motorcycles and vices were established. In 1954 there was a merger of the companies MOTA Maschinenbau GmbH and EUGEN METZGER to become METZGER & SCHLEGEL KG to produce bicycle frames, mopeds, lightweight motorcycles and vices. The merged company moved from Nagold to Fellbach near Stuttgart where they tried to sell their engines to other companies and motorcycle producers. After another change of name in 1959 from Metzger & Schlegel KG to SCHLEGEL KG, the company relocated to Öhringen near Heilbronn and stopped motorcycle production at the same time. In 1979 there was a hiving off of the SCHLEGEL vice production and founding of new company DURBAL GmbH & Co. KG which manufactured vices, clevises, angle joints, throttle control linkages, heavy-duty plain bearing and anti-friction bearing rod ends. Further information about MOTA Maschinenbau GmbH <Nagold> and METZGER & SCHLEGEL KG <Fellbach> are stored in the archives of the German Museum in Munich.

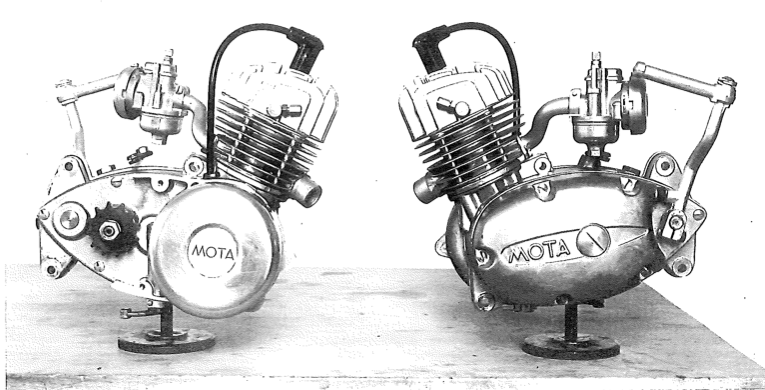
Two engines of MOTA Maschinenbau

== Models ==
=== Mota - „Wiesel“ ===
Mota Maschinenbau GmbH developed a two-wheel-vehicle between 1948 and 1952 which should unite the advantages of a scooter and motorbike: The Wiesel had leg shields and a carrier on the backside. The engines were produced by the company itself in different variations: 50, 75 and 98 cm^{3} of cubic capacity. Often the saddle wasn't height-adjustable, but adjustable to the front or back. A toolbox was installed just behind of it. The Wiesel was produced with the following high-quality components:

- lamps from Hella
- saddles from VELEDA
- hubs and brakes from Pränafa
- speedometer from VEIGEL

The product manager and some of the engineers took part in a cruise through Germany with three of these motorcycles, organized by the German Automobile Club, named ADAC, in 1950. Notwithstanding of the international success, there were not more than about 300 Wiesel produced before their production was stopped in 1952.

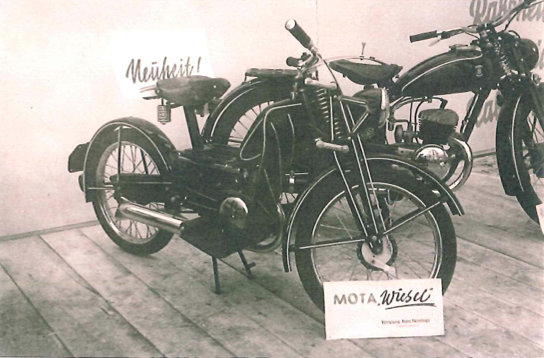
The "Wiesel" was produced from 1948 to 1952.

=== Motte 1 ===
After the termination of production of the Wiesel, the company still sold another small scooter with a one-gear engine and a cubic capacity of 43 cm^{3}. This two-wheel-vehicle was produced by the Metzger and Schlegel KG in Fellbach during 1954 and 1959 and sold for about 485,- Deutsche Mark.

==== Technical details ====
- measurements: l = 190 cm, w = 62 cm, h = 95 cm
- weight: 36 kg
- engine: 1 gear
- frame: sheet metal
- tyres: 26 x 2,00
- breaks: backpedal and front brakes
- tank capacity: 5.5 litres
- consumption: average consumption: 1.8 L/100 km
