= Elena Motta =

Guatemalan politician

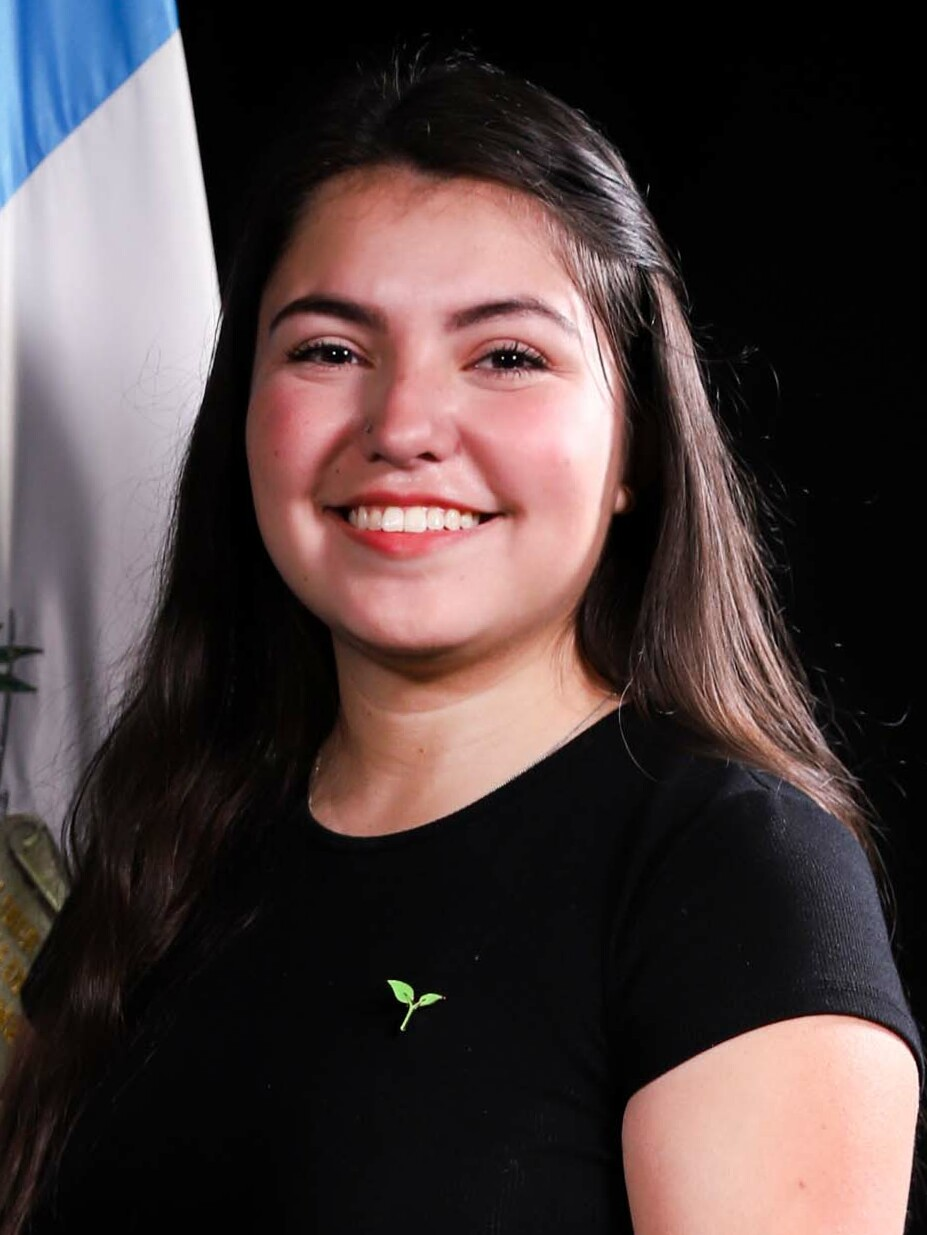
- Official portrait, 2024

Member of the Congress of Guatemala
- Incumbent
- Assumed office 14 January 2024
- Constituency: Guatemala City

Personal details
- Born: September 19, 2000 (age 26) Guatemala City, Guatemala
- Party: Roots
- Other political affiliations: Semilla
- Education: Rafael Landívar University

Elena Sofía Motta Kolleff (born 19 September 2000) is a Guatemalan politician, who is serving as a member of the Congress since January 14, 2024. A member of the Semilla party, Motta Kolleff became the youngest female member of Congress to take office in Guatemalan legislative history, surpassing Andrea Villagán, who took office at age 25. She represents the Guatemala City district, having been elected in 2023 general election.
