= Motta Navas =

Indian serial killer

- Born: Navas; 1966 (age 59–60); Kollam, India
- Status: Incarcerated
- Conviction: Murder
- Penalty: Life imprisonment

Details
- Victims: 7
- Span of crimes: June – August 2012
- Country: India
- State: Kerala
- Date apprehended: 2 November 2012
- Imprisoned at: Poojappura Central Jail

Motta Navas (born 1966) is an Indian serial killer who operated in the city of Kollam, Kerala between June and August 2012. Pavement dwellers were bludgeoned to death while they slept. All the murders took place at night and were committed by using stones or hard, blunt objects.

== Early murders ==
Navas had already been convicted twice for murder. In 1996 he was arrested on charges of murdering Rajasekaran at Mundakkal in Kollam and was jailed for four years. He was acquitted because there were no witnesses. In 2007 he was arrested again on charges of murdering one Shamir at Karikode in the city following which he was arrested and convicted.

== Serial killings ==
A series of brutal murders in the city of Kollam and nearby areas rocked the city in June 2012. Pavement and hutment dwellers were bludgeoned to death while they slept. All the murders took place at night and were committed by using stones or hard, blunt objects. A drug addict, Navas used to sleep by 8 p.m. and wake up at midnight to roam the city, targeting victims.

The first murder was committed on the night of 6 June. The victim, aged about 65 years, was hit on the head with a huge stone whilst he was sleeping under the SP Office flyover which was under construction. The second murder was committed the very next night on the veranda of a shop. The victim, Appukuttan Achary, was bludgeoned in the nape of his neck, fatally damaging the spine. The third murder was on the night of 18 June, also under the SP Office flyover. Bondan Kumar, 65, was hit on the head with a stone. On 3 August, Thankappan, 55, a native of Sasthamcotta, was found dead inside a bus waiting shed. He was sleeping in the shed when Navas attacked. The fifth murder was committed on the night of 21 August at the veranda of the Municipal Building in Chinnakkada. Sudarsanan, 45, was hit on the head with a stone. Navas had attempted two more murders, but the victims escaped with injuries.

== Arrest ==
Soon after the second murder, the police suspected Navas and took him into custody. Navas pretended to be mentally challenged and so the police got him admitted to a mental asylum in Thiruvananthapuram. Whilst there, however, psychiatrists found him mentally fit and he was discharged. He came back to Kollam and allegedly committed the other murders. Night patrol teams of the police had noticed Navas loitering in the city on those days, but on seeing the police party he feigned mental illness and was ignored by the police. After investigations which lasted about a fortnight a police team led by Kollam East Circle Inspector V. Sugathan, Sub Inspector G. Gopakumar, and senior civil police officer Prasanna Kumar arrested Navas from the Nehru Park area in the city on 2 November 2012.

== See also ==
- Schizophrenia
- Serial killer
- Raman Raghav
- Stoneman
- List of serial killers by country
