= Afonso Motta =

Brazilian politician

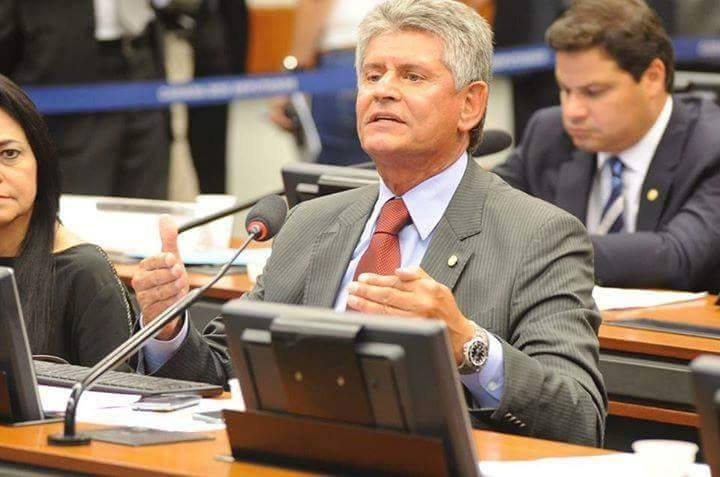
- Motta in 2015

Member of the Chamber of Deputies of Brazil
- Incumbent
- Assumed office 2011

Secretary of State of the Office of Mayors and Federative Relations of the Government of Rio Grande do Sul
- In office 5 January 2011 – December 2013
- Governor: Tarso Genro
- Preceded by: Jorge Branco

Personal details
- Born: 8 January 1950 (age 76) Porto Alegre, Brazil
- Party: Democratic Labour
- Education: Federal University of Rio Grande do Sul

Afonso Motta (born 8 January 1950) is a Brazilian politician. He has served as a member of the Chamber of Deputies of Brazil since 2011.

Born in Porto Alegre. Motta attended at the Federal University of Rio Grande do Sul, where he earned his Bachelor of Legal Sciences degree in 1972. He worked as a lawyer. In 2011, Motta became a member of the Chamber of Deputies of Brazil since 2011. In March 2021, he served as the chairperson of the Committee of Labor, Administration and Public Service.
