= Tiago Mota (footballer, born 1987) =

Portuguese footballer

Personal information
- Full name: Tiago André Ramos da Mota
- Date of birth: 20 May 1987 (age 39)
- Place of birth: Lisbon, Portugal
- Height: 1.85 m (6 ft 1 in)
- Position: Goalkeeper

Team information
- Current team: Sacavenense
- Number: 12

Youth career
- 2004–2006: Oriental

Senior career*
| Years | Team | Apps | (Gls) |
| 2006–2017 | Oriental | 135 | (0) |
| 2017–2019 | 1º Dezembro | 62 | (0) |
| 2019– | Sacavenense | 42 | (0) |
- * Club domestic league appearances and goals as of 30 June 2021

Tiago André Ramos da Mota (born 20 May 1987) is a Portuguese footballer who plays as a goalkeeper for Sacavenense.

== Career ==
Mota made his professional debut in the Segunda Liga for Oriental on 9 August 2014 in a game against Santa Clara.

In 2019, he signed with Sacavenense.
