= Julie Mota =

Papuan writer (born 1978)

Julie Kumin Mota (born 1978) is a writer, poet and artist from Papua New Guinea. Her artwork is held in the permanent collections of the Fine Arts Museums of San Francisco and the De Young Museum, also in San Francisco.

== Life ==
Mota was born in Tufi, Oro Province and studied theatre arts at the University of Papua New Guinea. She began working as an artist and writer in 1999.

=== Publications ===
- Cultural Refugees – An Anthology of Poems, CreateSpace, 2016
- Discovering Democracy - A guide for forming youth groups in Papua New Guinea , Live & Learn Environmental Education, 2012
