= M.O.T.A. (album) =

Studio album by Cultura Profética
- Released: October 11, 2005
- Genre: Reggae
- Length: 1:18:23
- Label: Machete; Luar

Cultura Profética chronology
Diario (2002)	M.O.T.A. (2005)	Tribute to the Legend: Bob Marley (2007)

M.O.T.A. is the fourth studio album by the Puerto Rican reggae band, Cultura Profética. The album was recorded at Playbach Studios in San Juan, Puerto Rico, and released in 2005.

The title is a Spanish acronym for "Momentos de Ocio en el Templo del Ajusco" (Ajusco: a volcano in Mexico City) which means "Moments of Leisure in the Temple of Ajusco". This is a reference to the suburb of Mexico City where the band lived during a four-month tour in that country, which inspired them for the material in this album. "Mota" is also a slang term for marijuana in Mexican Spanish.

MOTA reached number 12 on the Billboard Hot Latin Albums chart, becoming one of their most commercially successful projects.

== Track listing ==
All songs written by Eliut González, Willy Rodríguez, and Omar Silva, except where noted.

1. "Ritmo que pesa" - 5:49
2. "Revolución en estéreo" (González, Rodríguez) - 5:35
3. "Un deseo" (Rodríguez) - 5:22
4. "Nadie se atreve" (Rodríguez, Yallzee) - 5:32
5. "¿Qué será?" (Bayrex Jiménez, Rodríguez, Silva) - 4:43
6. "Yavida" (Rodríguez) - 4:20
7. "Canto en la prisión" (Boris Bilbraut, Elizam Escobar, González, Jiménez, Rodríguez, Silva) - 5:20
8. "Lo de más" (Letra de Silvio Rodríguez, tema del album Descartes (1998)) - 5:59
9. "Momento de ocio 1" (Bilbraut, González, Jiménez, Rodríguez, Silva) - 1:22
10. "No me interesa" (González, Rodríguez) - 5:44
11. "Canción despojo" (Rodríguez, Tek1) - 6:17
12. "Que tiempo se vive" - 6:04
13. "Momento de ocio 2" - 0:25
14. "La noche vibra" - 4:08
15. "Momento de ocio 3" - 2:10
16. "Desde mi silla" - 4:51
17. "Sube el humo" (González, Jiménez, Rodríguez) - 4:41

== Musicians ==
- Willy Rodríguez - bass guitar, vocals
- Eliut González - guitar
- Omar Silva - guitar, bass guitar
- Boris Bilbraut - drums, vocals
- Bayrex Jiménez - piano, keyboards

=== Additional musicians ===
- Efraín Martínez - drums on Tracks 4, 9 and 11
- Alexandre Carlo (from Natiruts) - vocals in "La Noche Vibra"
- Guillermo Bonetto (from Los Cafres) - vocals in "Ritmo Que Pesa"
- Siete Nueve - vocals in "Canción Despojo"
- Tek1 - vocals in "Canción Despojo"
- DJ Nature - samples on Tracks 4, 7, 11 and 17
- Iván Gutiérrez - piano in "Yavida"
- Claudio Illiobre (from Los Cafres) - Moog in "Canción Despojo"

== Production ==
- Produced by Willy Rodríguez, Eliut González, Omar Silva, Boris Bilbraut, Bayrex Jiménez

== Recording ==
- Recorded at Playbach Studios in San Juan, Puerto Rico
- Mixed at EMG Studios in Kingston, Jamaica
- Mix engineers - Errol Brown and Shane Brown
