= Ideas Nuevas =

Studio album by Cultura Profética
- Released: June 19, 2000
- Recorded: September 27, 1999 to October 30, 1999
- Genre: Reggae
- Length: 1:15:29
- Label: Luar Music

Cultura Profética chronology
Canción de Alerta (1998)	Ideas Nuevas (2000)	Cultura en Vivo (2001)

Professional ratings
Review scores
Source	Rating
Allmusic	(not rated)

Ideas Nuevas (in English, New Ideas) is the second album by the Puerto Rican reggae band, Cultura Profética. Like their first album, it was recorded in Jamaica at Marley Music Studios under the Tuff Gong label. It was released June 19, 2000.

== Track listing ==
1. "La Otra Galaxia" – 2:23
  - Music: Gutiérrez, Cultura Profética
2. "Ideas Nuevas" – 6:10
  - Music: Eliut González, Gutiérrez, CP
3. "Suelta los Amarres" – 6:03
  - Music: Rodríguez, CP
4. "Rompiendo el Letargo" – 6:57
  - Music: Rodríguez, Gutiérrez, CP
5. "No Me Busques" – 5:44
  - Music: Rodríguez, González, CP
6. "La Plaga" – 5:23
  - Lyrics: Boris Bilbraut, Paul Bilbraut
  - Music: B. Bilbraut, Rodríguez, Gutiérrez, González, CP
7. "Mr. Swin' y el Tres Pasitos Jazz Ensemble" – 3:54
  - Music: Gutiérrez, CP
8. "Siento" – 4:47
  - Lyrics: B. Bilbraut
  - Music: Rodríguez, CP
9. "Soldado" – 7:58
  - Lyrics: Ivy Andino
  - Music: Gutiérrez, Rodríguez, González, CP
10. "Ley Natural" – 6:20
  - Music: Rodríguez, Omar Silva, CP
11. "Reggae Rústico" – 4:41
  - Music: Rodríguez, Gutiérrez, CP
12. "So Much Trouble" – 3:53
  - Lyrics: Bob Marley
  - Music: Bob Marley and the Wailers
  - Arrangement: Cultura Profética
  - Additional lyrics: Bernard Satta Collins Abyssinian, Rodríguez
13. "Meditación Lunar" – 5:23
  - Lyrics: Rodríguez, Silva
  - Music: Gutiérrez, Silva, CP
14. "Diario" – 6:13
  - Music: Rodríguez, Silva, CP

All lyrics written by Willy Rodríguez, except where noted. All winds arrangements by Iván Gutiérrez.

== Musicians ==
- Boris Bilbraut – lead and background vocals, drums, percussion
- Willy Rodríguez – lead and background vocals, bass guitar, funde in "Diario"
- Iván Gutiérrez – piano, hohner clavinet, Moog Source, funde in "Diario"
- Eliut González – guitar, background vocals in "Ideas Nuevas", percussion in "So Much Trouble"
- Omar Silva – electric guitar, classic guitar, Puerto Rican cuatro, percussion in "So Much Trouble"
- Raúl Gaztambide – Oberheim organ, keyboards
- María Soledad Gaztambide – vocals
- Yarimir Cabán – vocals
- Ras Omar Cruz – percussion, Nyabinghi drums
- Eduardo Fernández – trombone
- Luis Rafael Torres – tenor sax, alto sax, flute
- Juan José "Cheo" Quiñones – trumpet, flugelhorn

=== Additional musicians ===
- Guillermo Bonetto (from Los Cafres) – vocals in "Suelta los Amarres"
- Bernard Satta Collins Abyssinian – vocals in "So Much Trouble"
- Uziah "Sticky" Tompson – funde in "Diario"
- Harry T. Powell – bass drum and repeater in "Diario"

== Production ==
- Produced by Willy Rodríguez, Iván Gutiérrez, Omar Silva, Eliut González, Boris Bilbraut
- Executive producer – Raúl "Tusti" López and José "Pepe" Dueño

== Recording ==
- Recorded at Marley Music and Tuff Gong Studios in Kingston, Jamaica
- Recording engineer – Errol Brown, Iván Gutiérrez, Shane Brown
- Recording assistants – Alrick Thompson, Roland McDermott, Christopher Miller, Claude Squire
- Mix engineer – Errol Brown
- Mixed by Errol Brown and Iván Gutiérrez
- Mastered at Fuller Sound, Miami, by Rob Fuller
- Photography by Carlos Manuel García
- Art direction and design – Kacho López Mari
