= Ana Celia Mota =

Argentine-American-Swiss condensed matter physicist

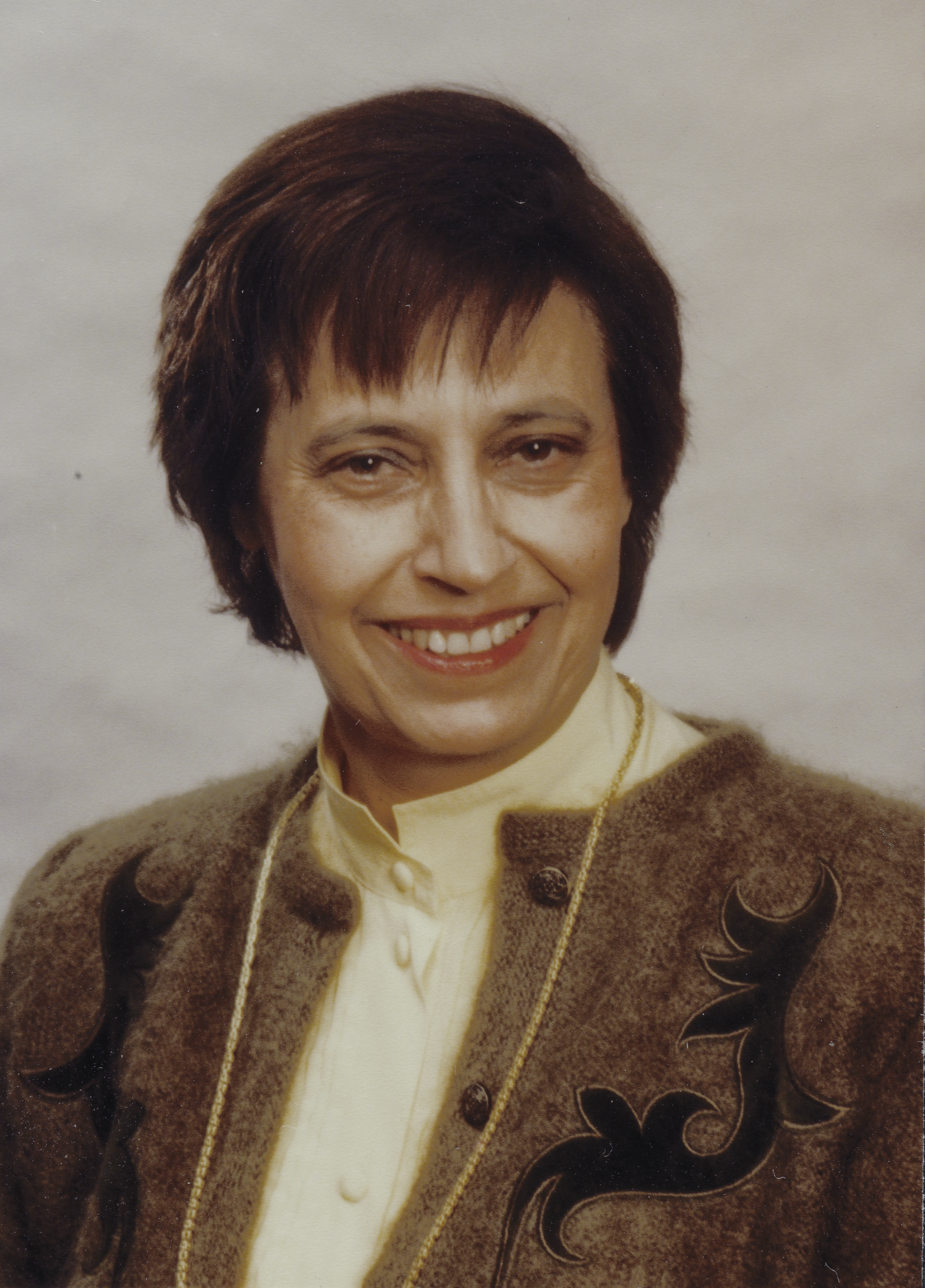
Ana Celia Mota (1997)

Ana Celia Mota (born 1935) is a retired Argentine-American condensed matter physicist specializing in phenomena at ultracold temperatures, including superfluids and superconductors. She is a professor emerita at ETH Zurich in Switzerland.

== Education and career ==
Mota was born in 1935 in Argentina, and is a US citizen. She studied physics at the Balseiro Institute in Argentina, where she earned a licenciate in 1960, and became a doctoral student of John C. Wheatley. Her research with him concerned the heat capacity of liquid Helium-3.

After earning her doctorate in 1967, she worked for eight years in the Department of Physics and Institute for Pure and Applied Physical Sciences at the University of California, San Diego, and then for five more years at the University of Cologne, before joining ETH Zurich in 1980. At ETH Zurich, she was Senior Researcher in the Laboratory of Solid State Physics, professor, and director of a research group on low-temperature physics.

== Recognition ==
Mota was named a Fellow of the American Physical Society (APS) in 1994, after a nomination from the APS Division of Condensed Matter Physics, "for work on superfluidity and superconductivity at ultra-low temperatures".
