= José Mota =

José Mota may refer to:

- José Mota (footballer, born 1919) (1919–?), Portuguese football forward
- José Mota (footballer, born 1964), Portuguese football player/manager
- José Mota (baseball) (born 1965), Dominican baseball player/broadcaster
- José Mota (comedian) (born 1965), Spanish comedian and actor
- José Mota (footballer, born 1979), Brazilian football forward
