= Mota, Gujarat =

Village in Gujarat, India

Mota
- Village
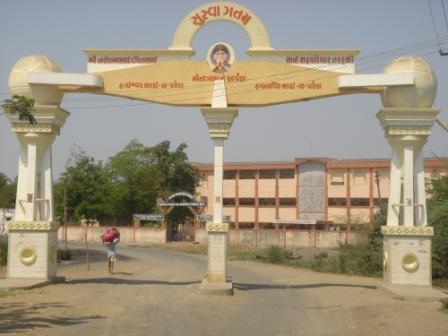
- Gateway of Mota

- Location in Gujarat, India Mota (India)
- Coordinates: 21.09°N 73.01°E
- Country: India
- State: Gujarat
- District: Surat
- Talukas: Bardoli

Government
  - Body: Mota Gram Panchayat
  - Sarpanch: Suryabhai Halpati
- Elevation: 21 m (69 ft)

Population (2001)
  - Total: 11,000

Languages
  - Official: Gujarati, Hindi
- Time zone: UTC+5:30 (IST)
- PIN: 394 345
- Telephone code: 02622
- Vehicle registration: GJ-19
- Lok Sabha constituency: Bardoli (ST) (Surat)
- Vidhan Sabha constituency: Bardoli
- Civic agency: Mota Gram Panchayat
- Website: www.motagaam.com

Mota is a village in Gujarat, India, 5 km north of Bardoli and 32 km east of Surat.

== Demographics ==
According to Census 2001, the population of Mota was nearly 11,000. Mota has a large population of Patidars (Leva & Chorotariya) Patels and Koli Patels. Other groups are Brahmins, Anavils, Vaishanav, Parmars, etc. Right now 26 castes of people are staying in Mota. About 300 families of Mota are settled around the world: about 250 families are in the US and a few are in New Zealand and South Africa.

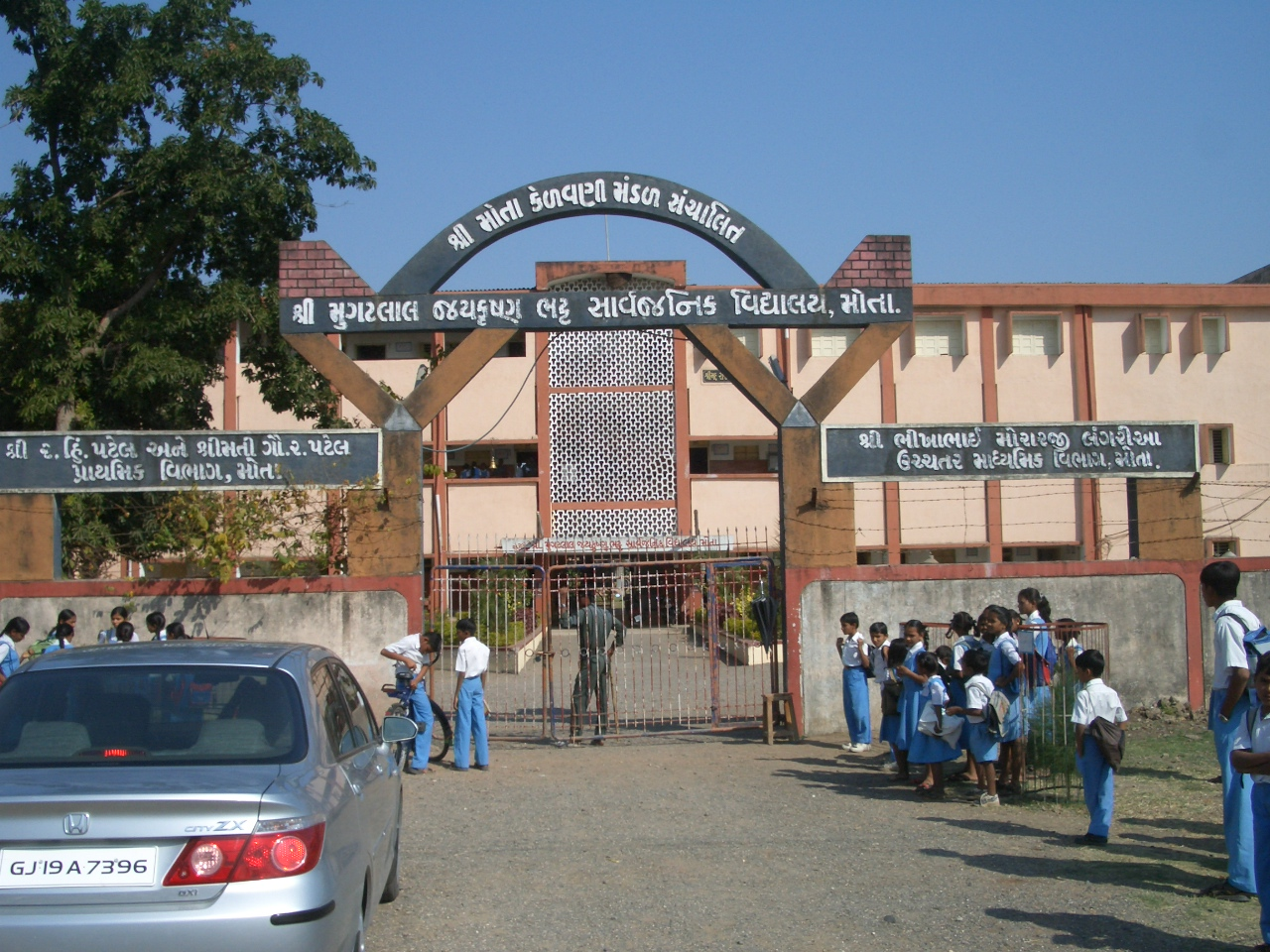
Mota School

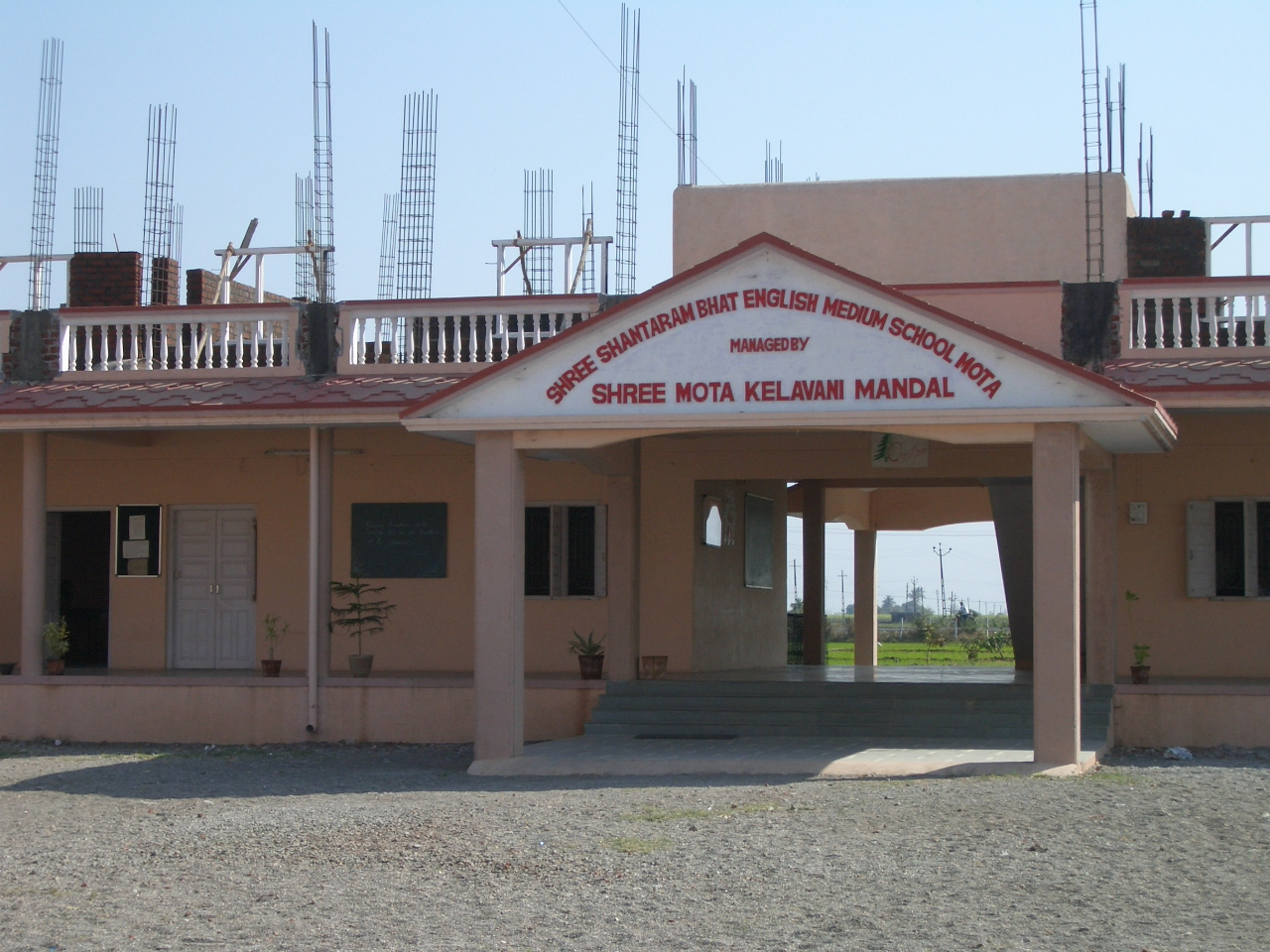
Mota English Medium School

== Education ==
Education in Mota is well developed by the Mota Kelavani Mandal (Education Board). They have "Balmandir" (KG) to "Secondary School" in Gujarati and English medium. Higher secondary school and hostel facilities are provided by the board.

== History ==
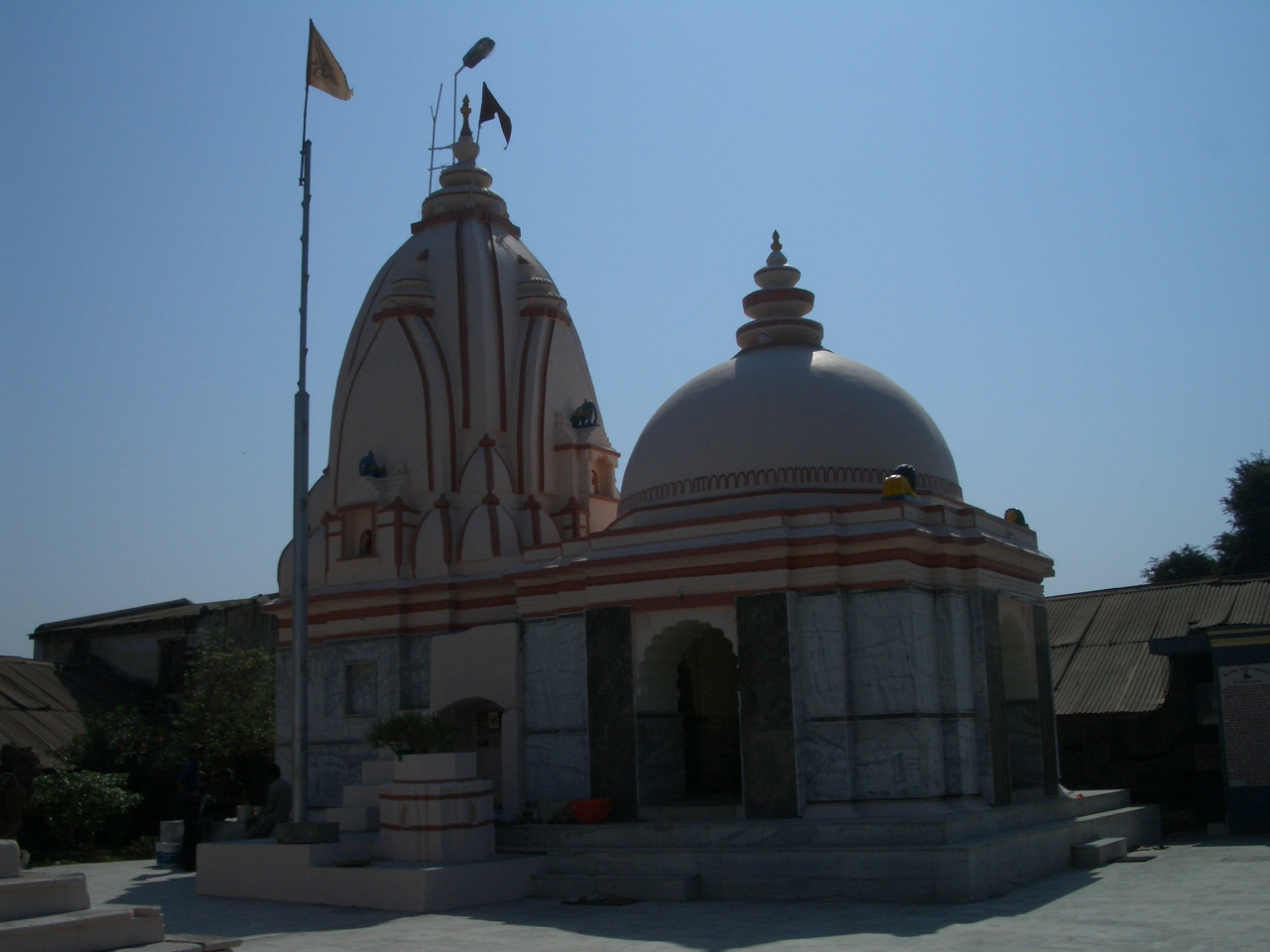
Rameshwar Mandir

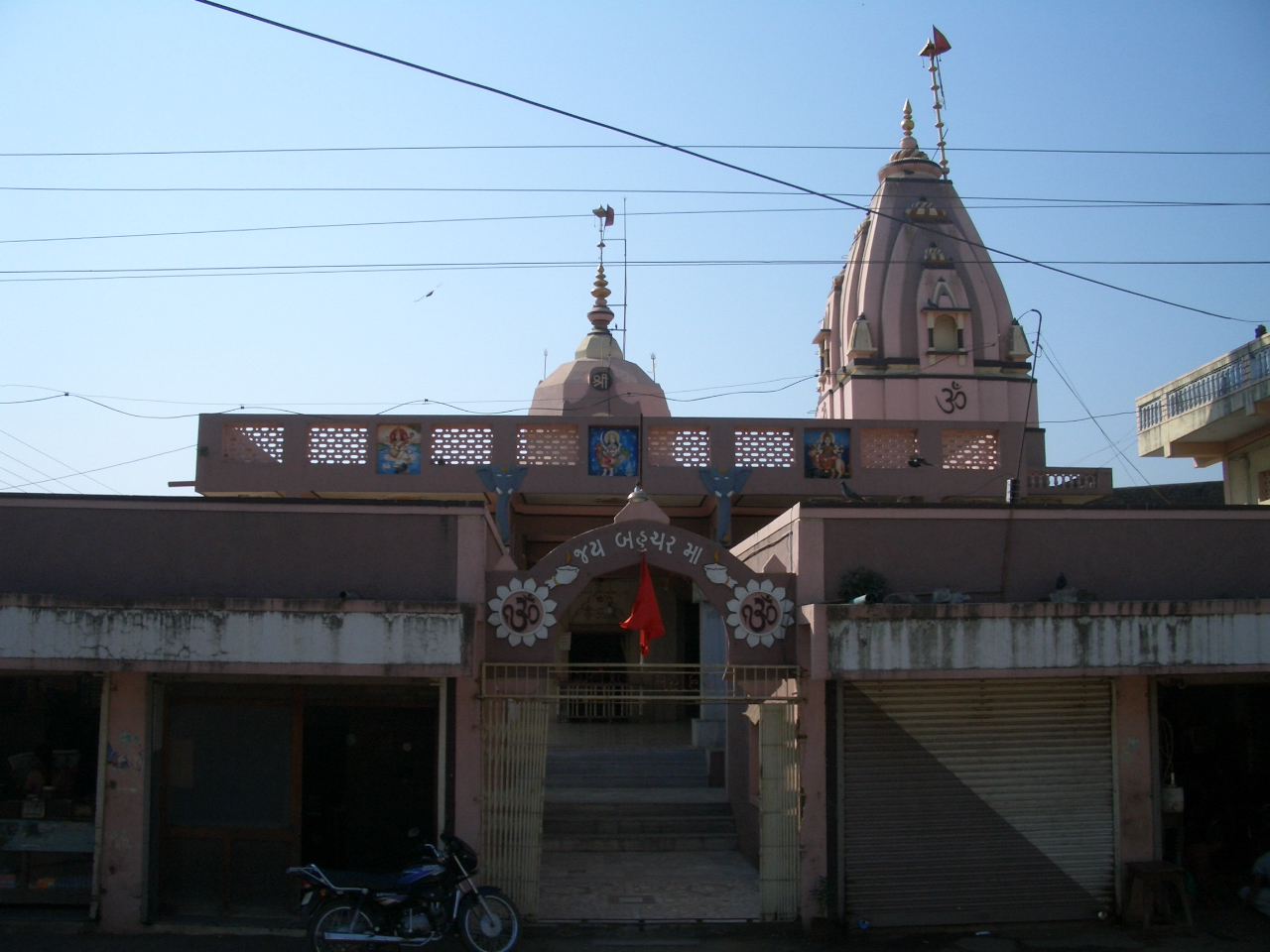
Bahucharama Mandir

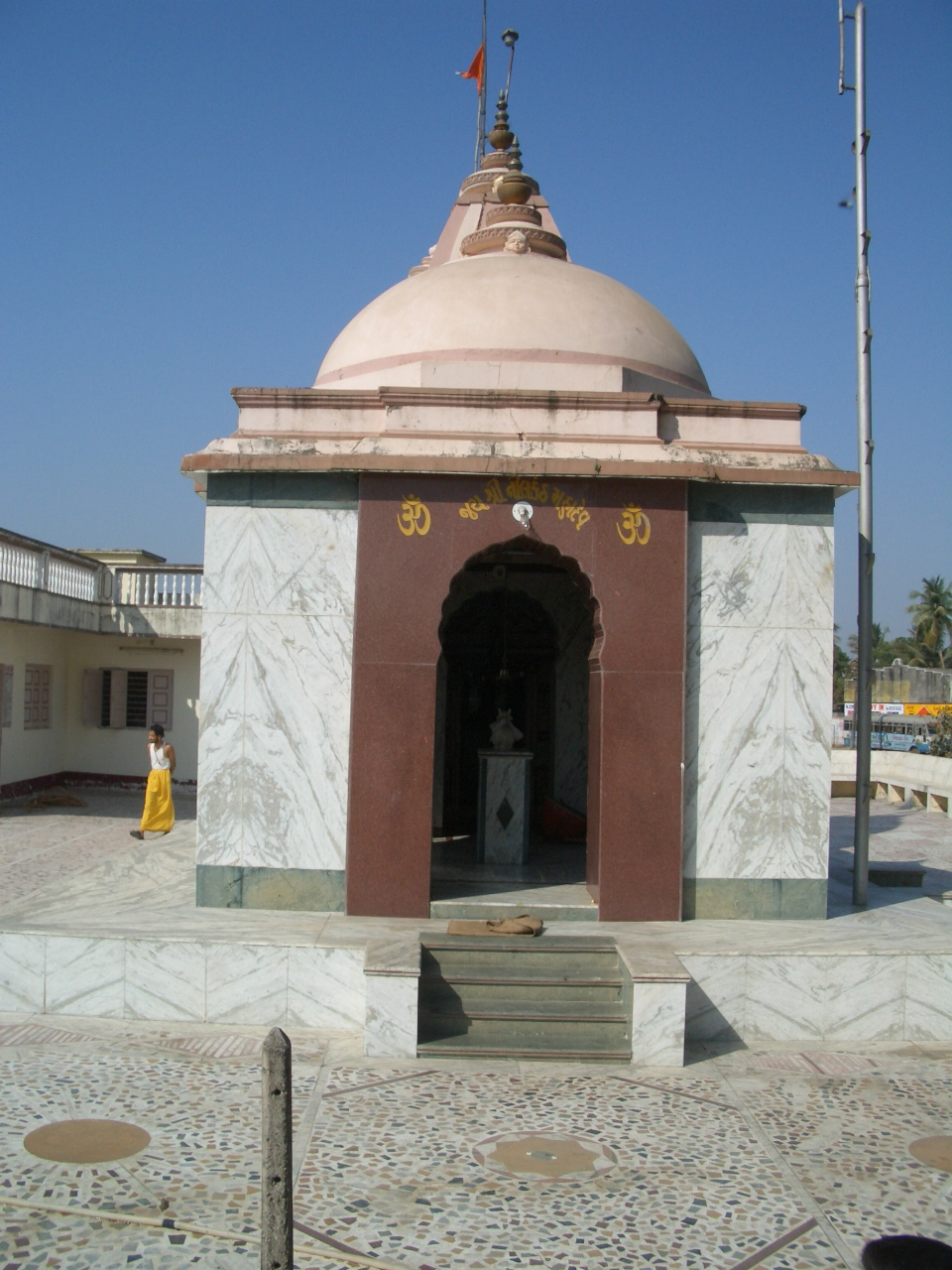
Neelkanth Mahadev

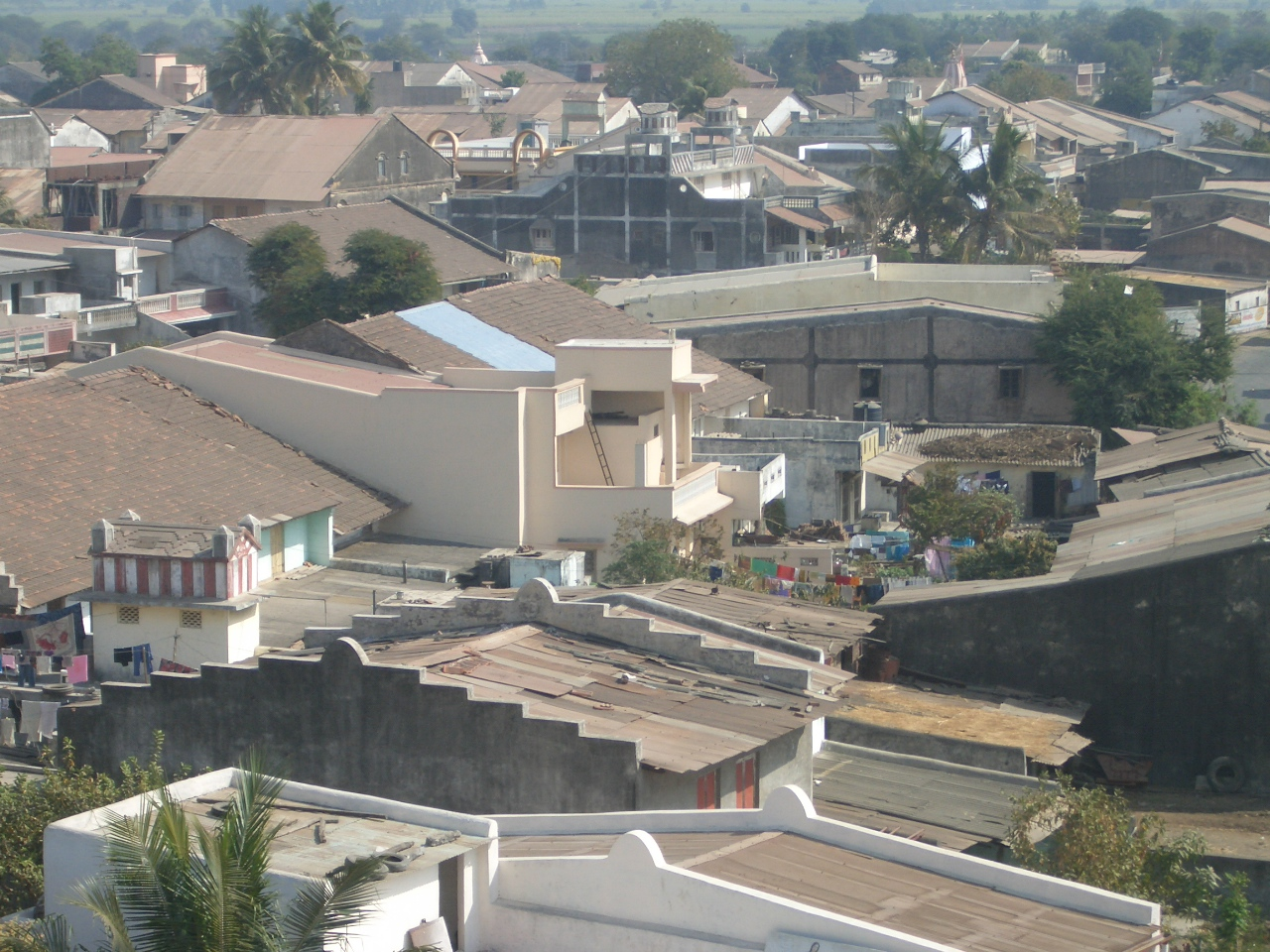
Sardar Chowk

Muktapuri, the present Mota Village, has a lot of small temples and resembles a small pilgrim place. It has been mentioned in Puranas. In Tapi Purana (Chapter 36) it's mentioned.

After killing Ravana, Lord Ram had dosha which made him reflect two shadows apart from him being a god. He started pilgrim to remove his dosha and reached the present place of Mukteshwar and there one shadow disappeared. And so felt that place as sacred and did puja and yagya and installed mahadev linga there. And as his dosh was disappeared so the name was given as Mukteshwar, and the village named as Muktapuri.

After completing the yagya he proceeded forward and reached at the present place of Rameshwar Mahadev. He arranged for the meals for Brahmins and for the fulfillment of the need for water he used the arrow named Gangasma. According to the rule before the meals for the worship of Lord Shiva he took sand in his hand from the place he shot arrow and installed Mahadev Linga. And then his another shadow disappeared and became fully dosh mukta. The ling in the form of sand done years ago is still present. And if you worship Rameshwar with your faith then your doshas disappear, and all your wished are fulfilled with Rameshwar blessings.lord Brahma Temple in Mota its very few in India, One in Puskar Rajasthan and one in Mota Gujarat.

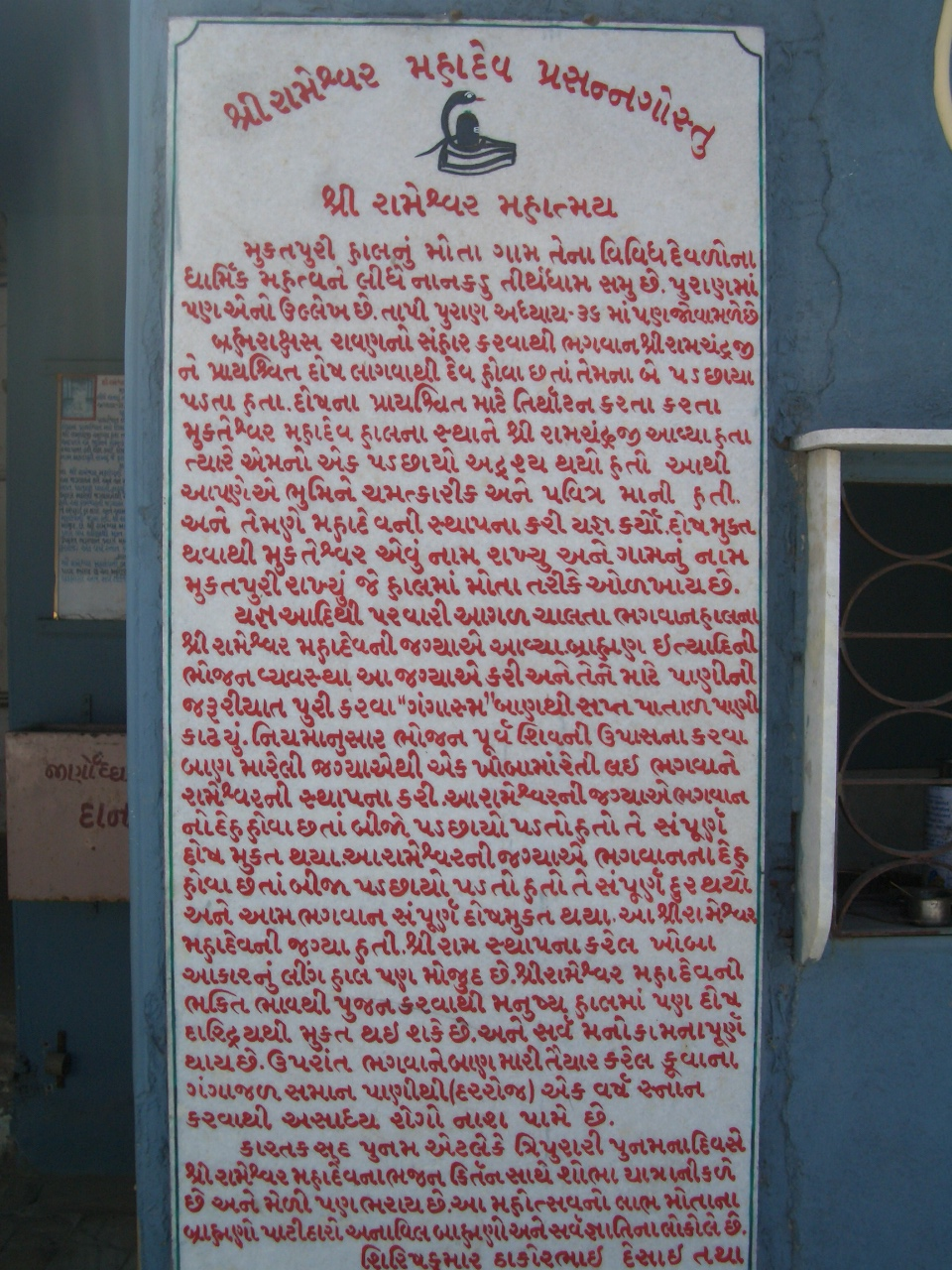
History of Rameshwar

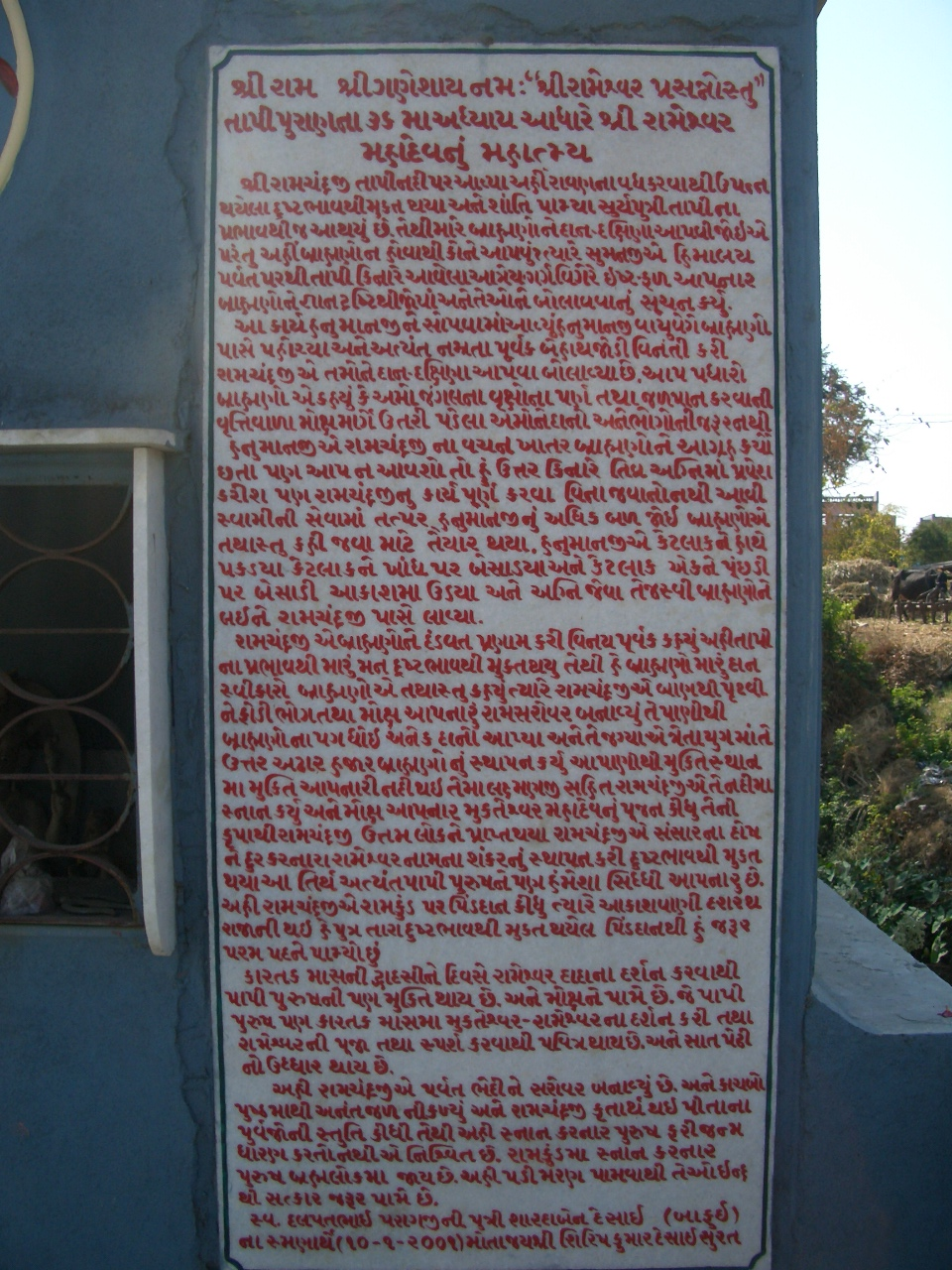
History of Rameshwar

Mota has nine ancient temples (Rameshwar Mahadev, Nilkantha Mahadev, Mukteshwar Mahadev, Serveshwar Mahadev, Bahuchera Mata, Narmadeshwar Mahadev, Khodiyar Mata, Ram Mandir, Bhutnath Mundir, Khokhali Mata, Mahalaxmi Mata).
