= Canción de Alerta =

Studio album by Cultura Profética
- Released: 1998
- Recorded: June 1998 in Marley Music Studios at Kingston, Jamaica
- Genre: Reggae
- Language: Spanish
- Label: Tuff Gong
- Producer: Raúl López; Cultura Profética

Cultura Profética chronology
Canción de Alerta (1998)	Ideas Nuevas (2001)

Professional ratings
Review scores
Source	Rating
Allmusic	

Canción de Alerta is the first album by the Puerto Rican reggae band, Cultura Profética. It was recorded in Jamaica at Marley Music Studios and released in 1998 under the Tuff Gong label.

== Track listing ==
Canción de alerta

1. "Enyoyando" – 1:11
  - Music: Iván Gutiérrez
  - Singers: Alrick Thompson, Ras "Rodjah"
2. "Con truenos hay que hablar" – 5:32
  - Music: Cultura Profética
  - Singers: Rodríguez, Boris Bilbraut
3. "Despertar" – 4:06
  - Singer: Rodríguez
4. "Lucha y Sacrificio" – 5:12
  - Lyrics: Vegoeli de Cuacio
  - Music: Eliut González, Rodríguez, Gutiérrez
  - Singer: Bilbraut
5. "Por qué cantamos" – 6:38
  - Lyrics: Mario Benedetti
  - Singer: Rodríguez
6. "Pasiones, Guerrillas y Muertes" – 4:56
  - Lyrics: Bilbraut
  - Music: Cultura Profética
  - Singer: Bilbraut
7. "Advertencia" – 6:01
  - Singer: Rodríguez
8. "Protesto" – 5:00
  - Lyrics: Bilbraut
  - Singer: Bilbraut
9. "Population Disorder" – 3:46
  - Music: Rodríguez
  - Singer: Rodríguez
10. "Tempestad Tranquila" – 3:37
  - Music: Gutiérrez
  - Singer: Bilbraut
11. "Fruto de la Tierra" – 4:23
  - Music: Gutiérrez
  - Singer: Rodríguez
12. "Filitustrein" – 3:04
  - Music: Gutiérrez
  - Singers: Alrick Thompson, Ras "Rodjah"

All lyrics written by Willy Rodríguez and all music written by Rodríguez and Iván Gutiérrez, except where noted.

== Musicians ==
- Willy Rodríguez – fretless bass, lead vocals
- Boris Bilbraut – drums, lead vocals
- Iván Gutiérrez – hohner clavinet, piano, trumpet, background vocals
- Eliut González – lead guitar, acoustic guitar, background vocals
- Juan Costa – rhythm guitar
- Raúl Gaztambide – organ
- Eduardo Fernández – trombone
- Javier Joglar – tenor sax, flute
- María Soledad Gaztambide – vocals

=== Additional musicians ===
- Omar Cruz – percussion

== Production ==
- Produced by Raúl López and Cultura Profética.
- Executive produced by Anibal and Jorge Jover, from CDT Records.

== Recording ==
- Recorded and mixed at Marley Music Studios, Kingston, Jamaica
- Recording and mix engineer – Eroll Brown
- Assistant engineer – Alrick Thompson
- Mastered at DRS in Levittown, Puerto Rico, by Estebán Piñero
