= Rai Cultura =

Rai Cultura is the cultural division of RAI, the national broadcaster of Italy. It operates the following channels:

Logo in use since 2018

- Rai 5, a channel about cultural events
- Rai Scuola (formerly Rai Edu Lab and Rai Edu 1), an educational channel
- Rai Storia (formerly Rai Edu 2), a history channel.
