= Nardi (carmaker) =

Italian automobile and racing car maker

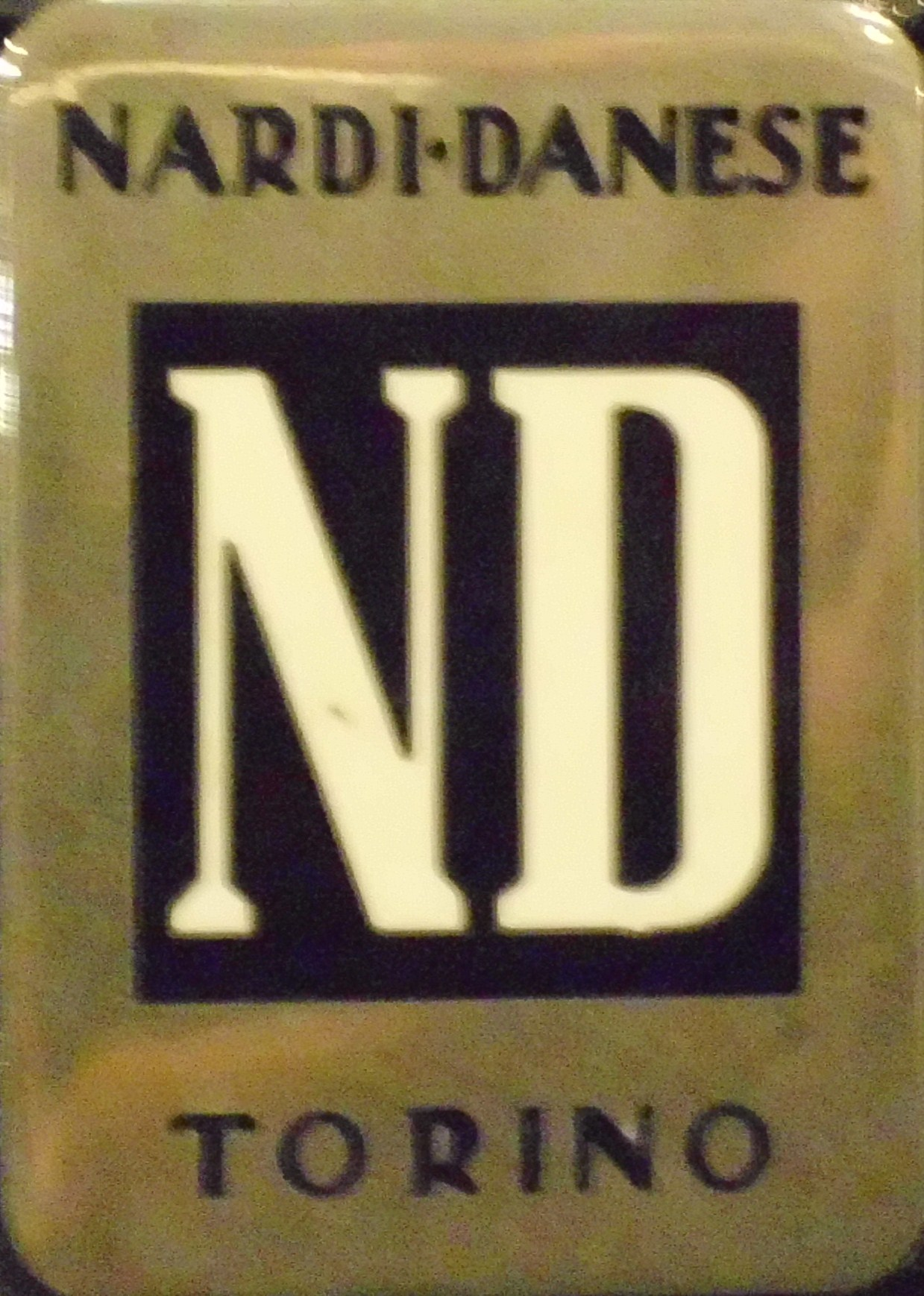
Nardi emblem

Officine Nardi was an Italian automobile and racing car maker, named for their creator.

Enrico Nardi was a racing mechanic, engineer, and driver who got his start with Lancia. He test drove the first car built by Auto Avio Costruzione in Modena, where many ex-Lancia colleagues joined him.

In 1932, Nardi joined with Augusto Monaco to create the Nardi-Monaco Chichibio. It used an air-cooled 998 cc 61 c JAP of 65 bhp (48 kW), 10 bhp (7.5 kW) more than the 1750 cc (107 in^{3}) Alfa Romeos of its competition, transversely mounted and coupled to a five-speed gearbox, but unusually, driving the front wheels. Weighing only 672 lb (305 kg), it proved capable of 180 km/h (110 mph). This was enough to win several Italian hillclimbs, including by Giulio Aymini in 1932.

Beginning in 1948, Nardi joined with and Renato Danese and established a workshop in Via Vincenzo Lancia, Turin, building racing cars, prototypes, and small-series special designs.

== The 750 Nardi-Danese ==
The 750 Nardi-Danese (or 750ND) was a tiny machine, assembled on a Fiat 500 chassis, powered by a 50 bhp (37 kW) 746 cc BMW flat twin motorcycle engine in the extreme nose with its cylinder heads (sometimes) exposed and a single headlight in the extreme nose. Despite the engine mounting, view over the nose was adequate, and unlike the Chicibio, the rear wheels were driven. It used a multi-tube chassis and was available as a monoposto (one-seater, or GP type) or due posti (two-seater, sports racer, when fitted with cycle fenders).

Its competition, mostly superannuated MG Midgets were no match for it, though it faced more competition from Bandinis. The car dominated circuit, hillclimb, and open road events. Nardi himself raced the monoposto in the Coppa d'Oro delle Dolomiti 'climb, winning in both 1947 and 1948. There were also three entered in the 1952 Targa Florio; all failed to finish. The 750ND remained competitive well into 1953, against the growing power of Ferrari and Maserati; at the Susa-Moncenisio 'climb, a 750ND was eighth, only 2% slower than the Ferrari of André Simon. It also made reputations for a couple of drivers, in particular later Lancia pilot Gino Valenzano.

== 1500 Sport ==
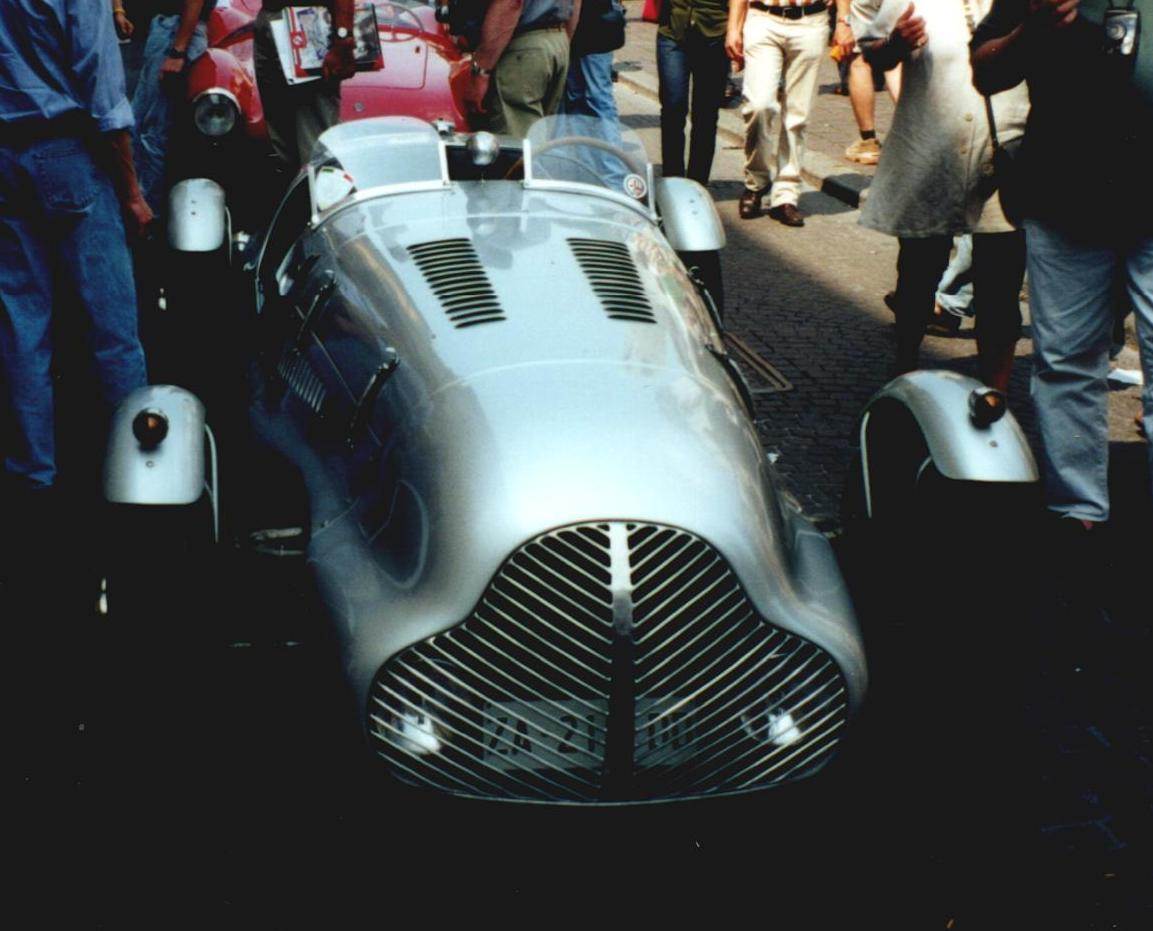
The Nardi-Danese 1500 Sport

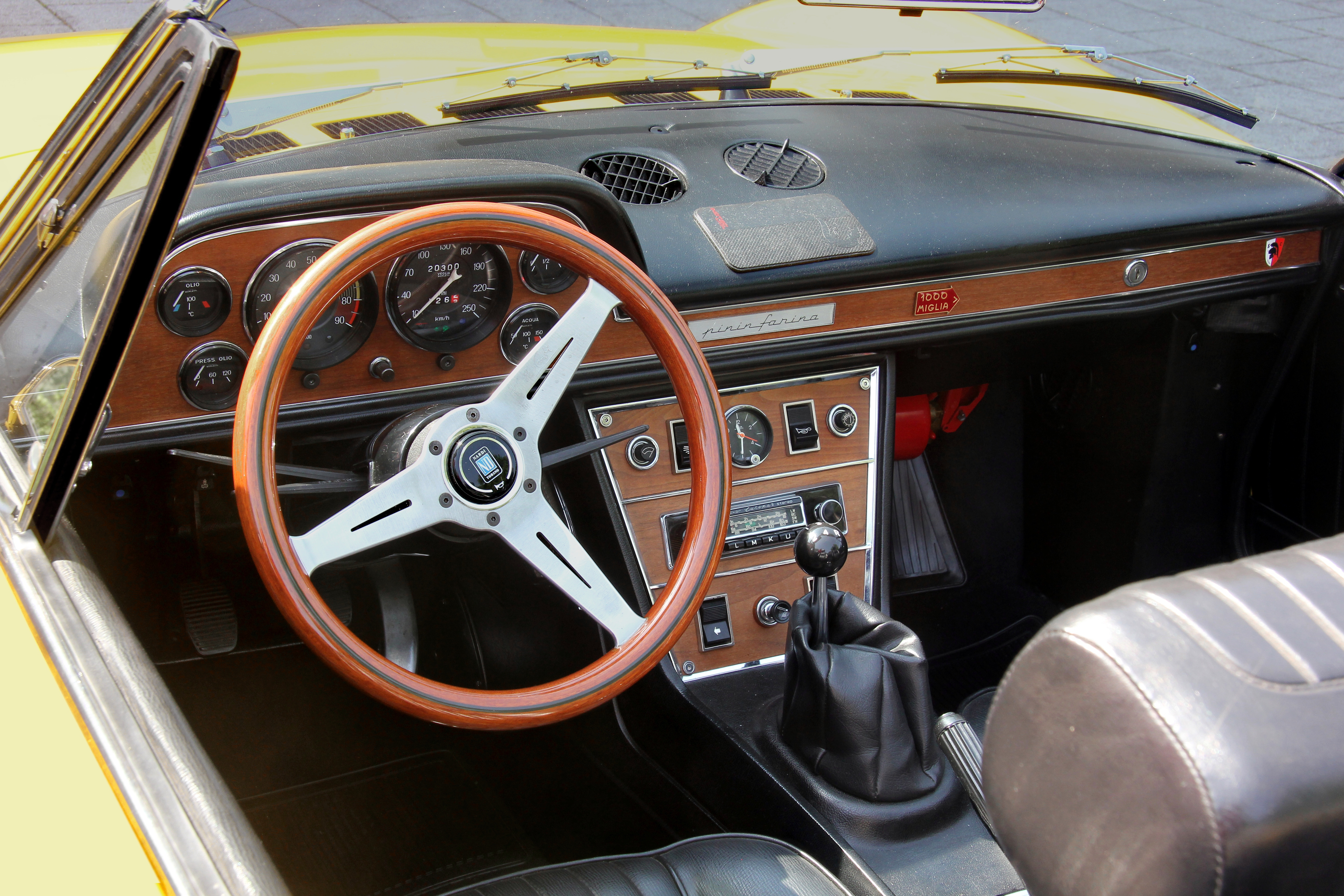
Nardi steering wheel in a Fiat Dino

For 1947, the Nardi-Danese 1500 Sport was built for Marco Crespi, coupling two 746 cc in series on an Auto Avio Costruzioni 815 chassis.

Around the same time, he traced the original Ferrari straight-eight castings, made in Bologna, and fitted them with 508 heads and an assortment of internal parts, to create a 1½ liter and a 2-liter car.

In 1948 and 1949, the company built Alfa Romeo 6C 2500 variations in two series.

== Establishes workshop ==
Nardi established his own workshop in the Via Lancia in 1951, focusing on prototypes and tuning equipment. Here, he designed or built several prototypes, including:

- a monoposto with a 500 cc Carru flat twin.
- a 1952 F2 prototype developed with Gianni Lancia using mid/rear-mounted 160 bhp (120 kW) Lancia Aurelia V6 engine, fitted with six Dell'Orto carburettors and Nardi's own head and camshaft. It featured aluminum bodywork by Rocco Motto (who also bodied Bandinis)
- two Raggio Azzurro (Blue Ray) prototypes (the B20 in 1955, B24 in 1958), designed by Michelotti and built by Vignale on 4th-series Aurelias.
- the 4CV, powered by a 750 cc Panhard, intended for the 1953 Le Mans, as well as the 750 LM Crosley in 1950-54. A 750 Spider was presented at 37th Paris Salon in 1950, bodied by Pietro Frua.
- The unusual Bisiluro Damolnar (bisiluro meaning twin torpedo), with the aid of Mario Damonte and Carlo Mollino. Following the lead of Piero Taruffi's Cisitalia Tarf record-breaker of 1948 and the Pegaso that failed to start at Le Mans in 1953, it was a twin-boom model (separated by airfoils), with a twin-cam 737 cc Giannini engine producing 62 bhp (46 kW) at 7000 rpm and tandem wheels in one boom, driver and tandem wheels in the other. Weighing 450 kg (992 lb), it was capable of up to 216 km/h (134 mph), it started at Le Mans in 1955, falling out early. It currently resides in the Leonardo da Vinci Museum in Milano.
- Silver Ray was 350 bhp (260 kW) Plymouth Golden Commando V8-engined, Michelotti-bodied coupē, built for William Simpson in 1960.
- single-seater on VW Beetle components, Formula Vee prototype for Hubert Brundage (1959).

After the failure of the bisiluro, Officine Nardi ceased work on car prototypes in the mid-1950s and turned to aftermarket such as manifolds, crankshafts, camshafts. It has become best known for the Nardi steering wheel, introduced in 1951 in walnut, since but mostly using African mahogany. The Nardi wheel was first fitted to a 1952 Pegaso.

== Death ==
After Nardi's death in 1966, the officine was run by Barbero until 1969, then by Iseglio.

== Sources ==
- Setright, L. J. K. "Nardi: The Italian Miniaturist" in Ward, Ian, executive editor. The World of Automobiles, Volume 13, p. 1491-2. London: Orbis Publishing, 1974.

Nardi-Personal Website
