= Nardi 750LM =

Former racing car

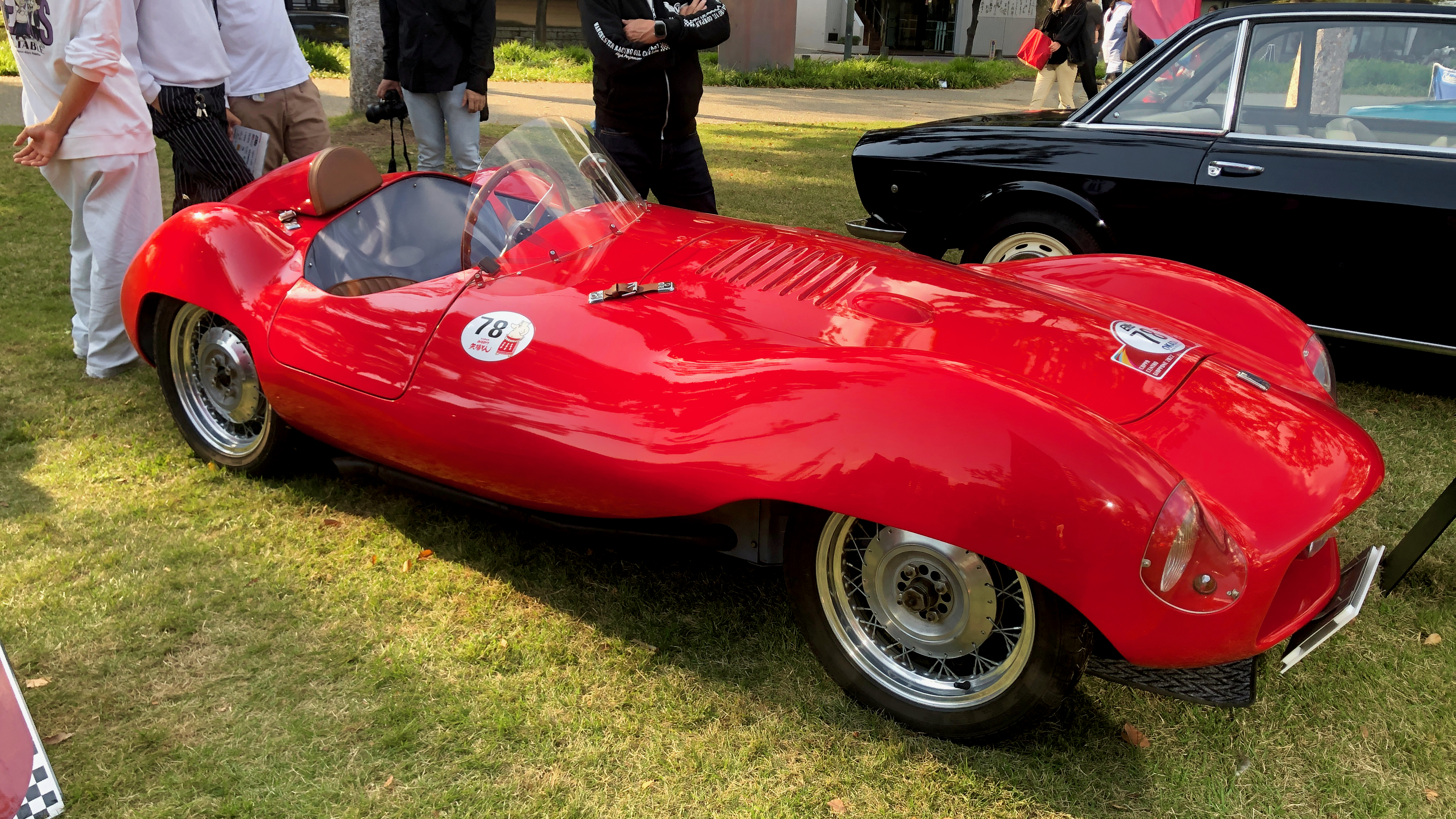
- Category: S-750
- Designer: Enrico Nardi
- Production: ~70 (1946-1957)

Technical specifications
- Chassis: Fiat 500
- Length: 2,486 millimetres (97.9 in)
- Width: 1,477 millimetres (58.1 in)
- Height: 999 millimetres (39.3 in)
- Wheelbase: 1,900 millimetres (75 in)
- Engine: BMW R51/3 746 cubic centimetres (45.5 cu in; 0.746 L) Flat Twin RMR Layout
- Transmission: 4-speed Manual
- Power: 43–62 brake horsepower (44–63 PS; 32–46 kW) @ 5,500-7,000 rpm 75–100 newton-metres (55–74 lbf⋅ft) @ 2,000-3,000 rpm
- Weight: 400–453 kilograms (882–999 lb)

Competition history
Entries	Races	Wins	Podiums	Poles
10	10	3	2	1

The Nardi 750LM Crosley was one of the starters for the 1955 24 Hours of Le Mans motor race during which the 1955 Le Mans disaster occurred. The car was famous for its twin torpedo like body work with the engine in one compartment and driver and fuel tank in the other. Joining these two sides was an upside down wing and this was the cars' downfall as it was blown off the road by a faster car as it was passing.

== Bisiluro Damolnar ==
The 750 Nardi-Danese (or 750ND) was a tiny machine, assembled on a Fiat 500 chassis, powered by a 50 bhp (37 kW) 746 cc BMW flat twin motorcycle engine in the extreme nose with its cylinder heads (sometimes) exposed and a single headlight in the extreme nose. Despite the engine mounting, view over the nose was adequate, and unlike the Chicibio, the rear wheels were driven. It used a multi-tube chassis and was available as a monoposto (one-seater, or GP type) or due posti (two-seater, sports racer, when fitted with cycle fenders).

Its competition, mostly superannuated MG Midgets were no match for it, though it faced more competition from Bandinis. The car dominated circuit, hillclimb, and open road events. Nardi himself raced the monoposto in the Coppa d'Oro delle Dolomiti 'climb, winning in both 1947 and 1948. There were also three entered in the 1952 Targa Florio; all failed to finish. The 750ND remained competitive well into 1953, against the growing power of Ferrari and Maserati; at the Susa-Moncenisio 'climb, a 750ND was eighth, only 2% slower than the Ferrari of André Simon. It also made reputations for a couple of drivers, in particular later Lancia pilot Gino Valenzano.
