= Antonio Baudo =

Italian motorcycle designer

Antonio Baudo was an Italian motorcycle designer.

Baudo established the Officine Meccaniche Baudo in Turin in 1921, making three prototypes that had V2 engines of 474, 668 and 1000 ccm. In 1926 they showed two models that used 250 and 350 ccm motorcycle engines from JA Prestwich Industries (JAP) and Blackburne (motorcycles).

In 1925 he joined Paolo Motta and started Motta & Baudo, which made one prototype, the MB with a 1.35 liter Chapuis-Dornier motorcycle engine. With Augusto Monaco he created the Monaco-Baudo in 1927.

The Baudo brand was sold in 1929 to Joseph Navone who made a couple of Baudo-labelled cars.
