= Gino Valenzano =

Italian racing driver

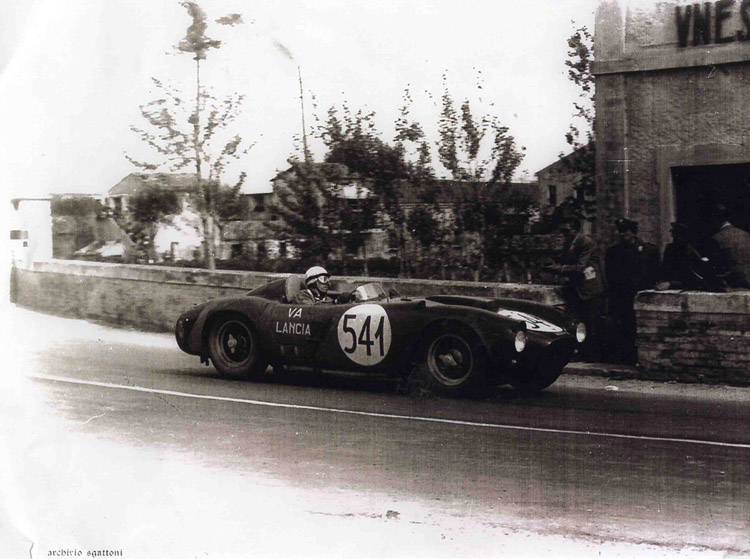
Gino in Lancia D24 at 1954 Mille Miglia

Luigi "Gino" Valenzano (April 24, 1920, Asti - May 28, 2011) was an Italian racing driver. He entered 39 races between 1947 and 1955 in Abarths, Maseratis and Lancias as a teammate of drivers like Robert Manzon and Froilán González.

== Early life ==
As a young man. Valenzano was fascinated by airplanes and air travel, so he studied at the Academy of Caserta. However, he was called back to Turin after his father's sudden death. During World War II Gino and his brother Piero had to leave Turin because of their relation to Pietro Badoglio, so they lived in Rome for a while, until they were sold out to soldiers, who deported the brothers to Mauthausen. May 5, 1945 they were liberated by the Americans.

== Racing career ==
A video with his brother Piero (#136), and after a few minutes, we see Gino (#142 in his Maserati A6GCS). This is at Coppa d' Oro delle Dolomiti on 10 July 1955, where Piero died and Gino gave up racing.

Valenzano started competing in hillclimbs in his own build single seater and received later a BMW-engined single seater designed by Enrico Nardi. He was soon noticed by Carlo Abarth, who hired him as works driver for Abarth. There he met Gianni Lancia, son of Vincenzo, with whom he went to the Liceo classico Massimo d'Azeglio as a child. Lancia let him try out an Aurelia B20 and Valenzano decided to compete in professional racing with that car and later the Lancia D20 and D24. He competed in Mille Miglia, Targa Florio and the 24 Hours of Le Mans. Among his teammates were Luigi Segre and other successful drivers, including Alberto Ascari, Luigi Villoresi, Juan Manuel Fangio and Luigi Musso. In 1955 Lancia withdrew as a team from professional racing, so Valenzano switched to Maserati and drove six more races. However, this would be his last season, because his brother Piero died during the Coppa d' Oro delle Dolomiti on July 10, 1955.

=== Complete results ===
Gino Valenzano racing results
Year	Date	Race	Entrant	Car	Teammate(s)	Result
1947	June 29	Varese		Fiat 1100		
1947	July 20	Coppa d' Oro delle Dolomiti		Revelli Monaco; Testadoro		10th
1947	August 24	Circuito di Senigallia		Fiat		7th
1948	April 4	Targa Florio				DNF
1948	May 2	Mille Miglia		Fiat	Rocco Motto	DNF
1948	May 9	Vercelli		Nardi-Danese		8th
1948	July 11	Coppa d' Oro delle Dolomiti		Nardi-Danese		6th
1949	April 24	Mille Miglia		Fiat 1100 Cabriolet	Luigi Segre	63rd
1949	July 17	Coppa d' Oro delle Dolomiti		Nardi-Danese		DNF
1949	August 21	Circuito de Senigallia		Nardi-Danese		6th
1950	April 23	Mille Miglia		Fiat 1100 E	Luigi Segre	59th
1950	June 11	Premio di Apertura		Nardi-Danese		6th
1950	August 20	Pergusa Grand Prix		Abarth 1100		1st
1950	October 8	Modena		Nardi-Danese		4th
1951	April 29	Mille Miglia	Lancia	Lancia Aurelia	Luigi Maggio	7th
1951	August 11	6 Hours of Pescara		Lancia Aurelia		3rd
1952	March 9	Giro di Sicilia		Lancia Aurelia	Emilio Giletti	3rd
1952	May 4	Mille Miglia		Lancia Aurelia	"Paltrinieri"	DNF
1952	June 1	Prix de Monte Carlo	Scuderia Lancia	Lancia Aurelia	none	4th
1952	June 15	24 Hours of Le Mans	Scuderia Lancia	Lancia Aurelia	"Ippocampo"	6th
1952	June 29	Targa Florio		Lancia Aurelia		2nd
1952	July 13	Coppa d' Oro delle Dolomiti		Lancia Aurelia		DNF
1953	April 12	Giro di Sicilia	Scuderia Lancia	Lancia Aurelia	"S. Ramella"	2nd
1953	April 26	Mille Miglia		Lancia Aurelia	"Margutti"	DNF
1953	May 14	Targa Florio	Scuderia Lancia	Lancia D20	none	4th
1953	May 31	Coppa della Toscana	Scuderia Lancia	Lancia Aurelia	Luigi Maggio	2nd
1953	June 14	24 Hours of Le Mans	Scuderia Lancia	Lancia D20	Felice Bonetto; Froilán González	DNF
1953	June 28	Giro dell'Umbria		Lancia Aurelia	Luigi Maggio	3rd
1953	July 12	Coppa d' Oro delle Dolomiti	Scuderia Lancia	Lancia D23	none	DNF
1954	March 7	12 Hours of Sebring	Scuderia Lancia	Lancia D24	Profirio Rubirosa	2nd
1954	May 2	Mille Miglia	Scuderia Lancia	Lancia D24	none	DNF
1954	September 11	RAC Tourist Trophy	Scuderia Lancia	Lancia D24	Robert Manzon; Eugenio Castellotti	3rd
1955	March 13	12 Hours of Sebring	Maserati Co. & B. S. Cunningham	Maserati 300S	Cesare Perdisa	4th
1955	May 15	Bari Grand Prix		Maserati A6GCS		4th
1955	May 29	Supercortemaggiore	Maserati	Maserati 300S	Franco Bordoni	DNF
1955	June 2	Coppa Delle Sei Ore		Lancia Aurelia		
1955	June 5	Mugello Grand Prix		Maserati A6GCS		10th
1955	June 12	24 Hours of Le Mans	Officine Alfieri Maserati	Maserati 300S	Luigi Musso	DNF
1955	July 10	Coppa d' Oro delle Dolomiti		Maserati A6GCS		DNF
