= Enrico Nardi =

Italian racing car driver and designer

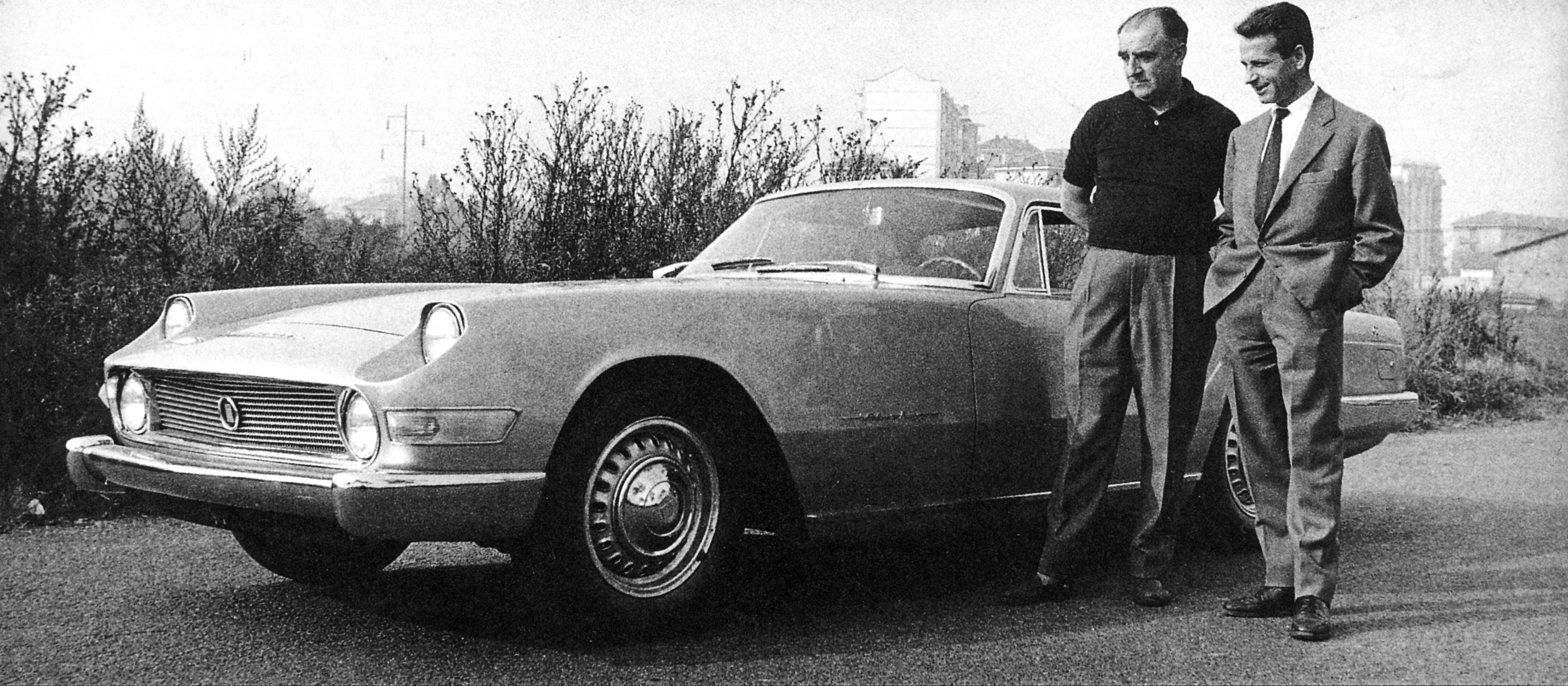
Nardi and Giovanni Michelotti at right, with the 1960 Plymouth Silver Ray

Enrico Nardi (1907 in Bologna – 23 August 1966) was an Italian racing car driver and designer.

He worked at Lancia between 1929 and 1937 as a truck engineer, racing car driver, and later, advisor to Vincenzo Lancia. He was moderately successful as a driver by 1932, when, with Augusto Monaco, he created the Nardi-Monaco Chichibio.

Nardi himself also competed in Mille Miglia, sharing a Fiat 508 Balilla with J. McCain in 1935 and with M. Trivero in 1936, as well as a Lancia Augusta Berlina with Vittorio Mazzonis in 1937, and a Lancia Aprilia speciale in 1938 with Pier Ugo Gobbato (1918–2008), the son of Alfa Romeo CEO Ugo Gobbato.

Working at Scuderia Ferrari from 1937 until 1946, Nardi became known for setting up the Fiat 508 (chassis for the 1940 Auto Avio Costruzioni 815), and doing the development work following Massimino's design; he also co-drove an 815 with owner Lotario Rangoni in the 1940 Mille Miglia.

== Nardi-Danese ==
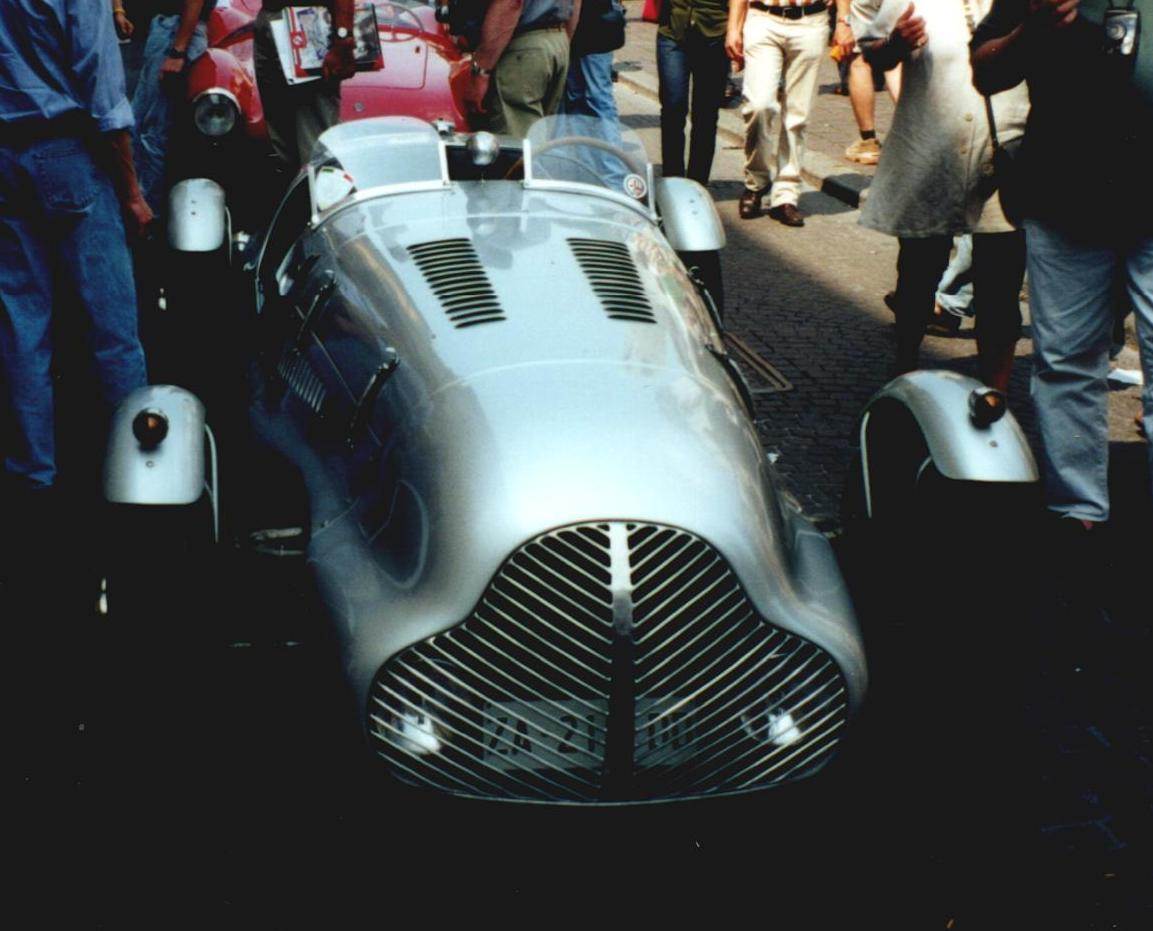
A 1947 Nardi-Danese

After World War II, he and Renato Danese established a workshop in Via Vincenzo Lancia, Turin, building racing cars, prototypes and small-series special designs.

- 750 Nardi
- Nardi-Danese 1500 sport. Fitted for the Roman driver Marco Crespi, 8-cylinder as in the Auto Avio Costruzioni 815.
- Alfa Romeo 6C 2500 variations

Nardi himself raced the monoposto (one-seater, or GP type), in Coppa d'Oro delle Dolomiti hillclimb, winning in 1947 and 1948). It was also entered by three drivers in the 1952 Targa Florio, but failed to finish.

== Nardi & C. S.a.S. ==
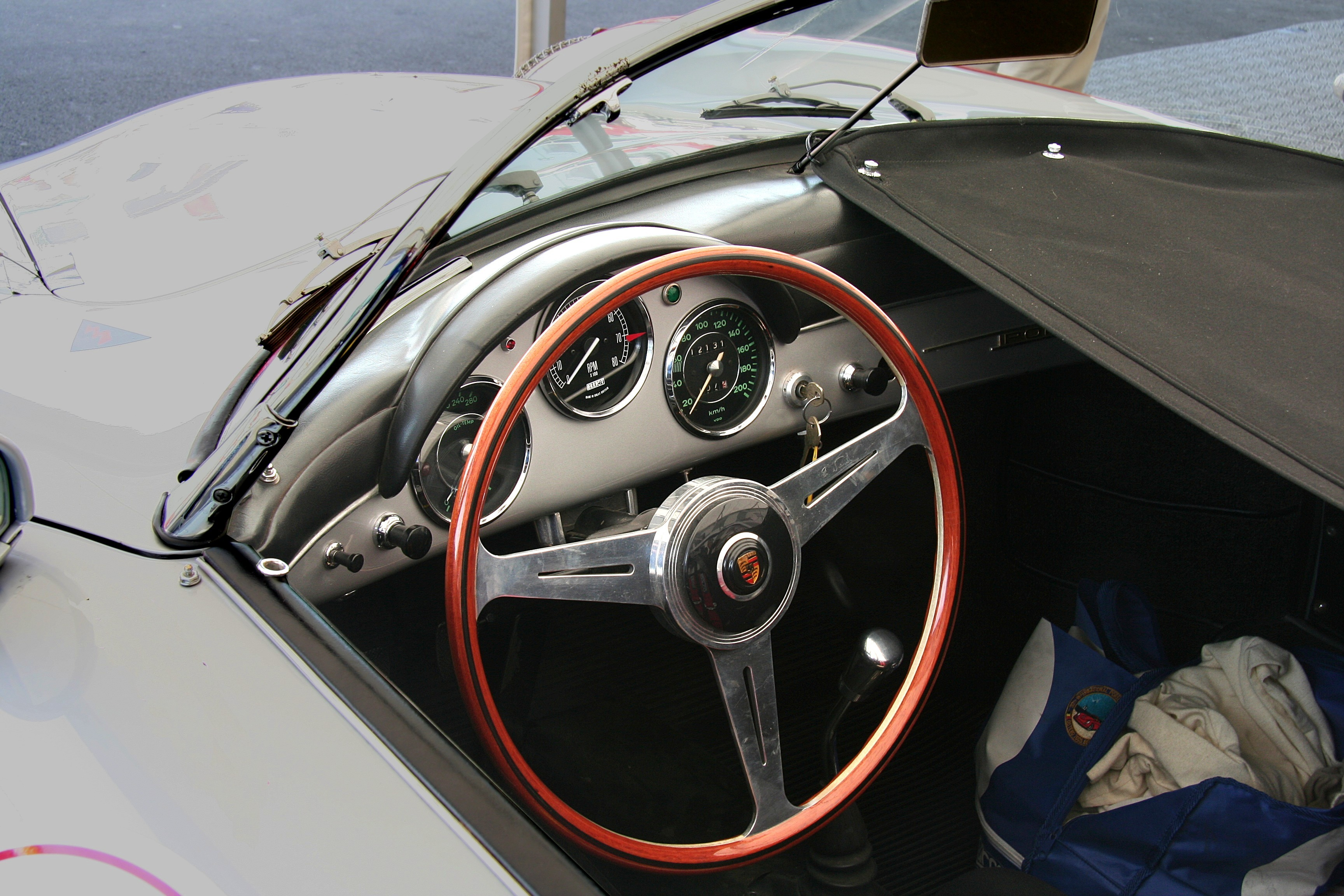
A Nardi steering wheel in a Porsche 356 Speedster

His own workshop was established in Via Lancia (1951), focusing on prototypes and tuning equipment. Amongst the prototypes were:

- an F2 prototype developed with Gianni Lancia (1952).
- two Raggio Azzurro (Blue Ray) prototypes, designed by Michelotti and built by Vignale on 4th-series Lancia Aurelia's (B20 1955, B24 1958).
- the 4CV, a 750 cc Panhard-powered racer intended for Le Mans (1953), as well as the 750 LM Crosley (1950–54). A 750 Spider was presented at 37th Paris salon (1950), body by Pietro Frua.
- The Bisiluro Damolnar (bisiluro meaning twin torpedo) was built by Mario Damonte, Carlo Mollino, & Nardi, using a Gianni engine. It ran at Le Mans (1955) and is currently in the Museo della Scienza e della Tecnologia "Leonardo da Vinci" in Milan.
- Silver Ray, a Plymouth Golden Commando V8 350 bhp-engined Michelotti-bodied coupe for William Simpson of Coral Gables FL (1960).
- single-seater on VW Beetle components, Formula Vee prototype, for Hubert Brundage (1959).

Officine Nardi (meaning, "Nardi workshop") ceased to work with car prototypes in the mid-50s and specialized in speed-enhancing parts such as manifolds, crankshafts, camshafts. It has become most known for the Nardi steering wheel, initially (in 1951) using walnut but mostly using African mahogany wood. The Nardi wheel was first fitted to a 1952 Pegaso.

Nardi also made floor gearshift conversions for the Peugeot 403 and 404 models.

Nardi died from blood poisoning from exhaust gas, after which his workshop was run by Barbero (1966–69) and Iseglio.
