= Augusto Monaco =

Italian engineer (1903-1997)

The article concerns Augusto Monaco (1903-97), an Italian automobile engineer. See elsewhere for Augusto Monaco (born 1970), a futsal-player representing Argentina national futsal team in 2000 FIFA Futsal World Championship

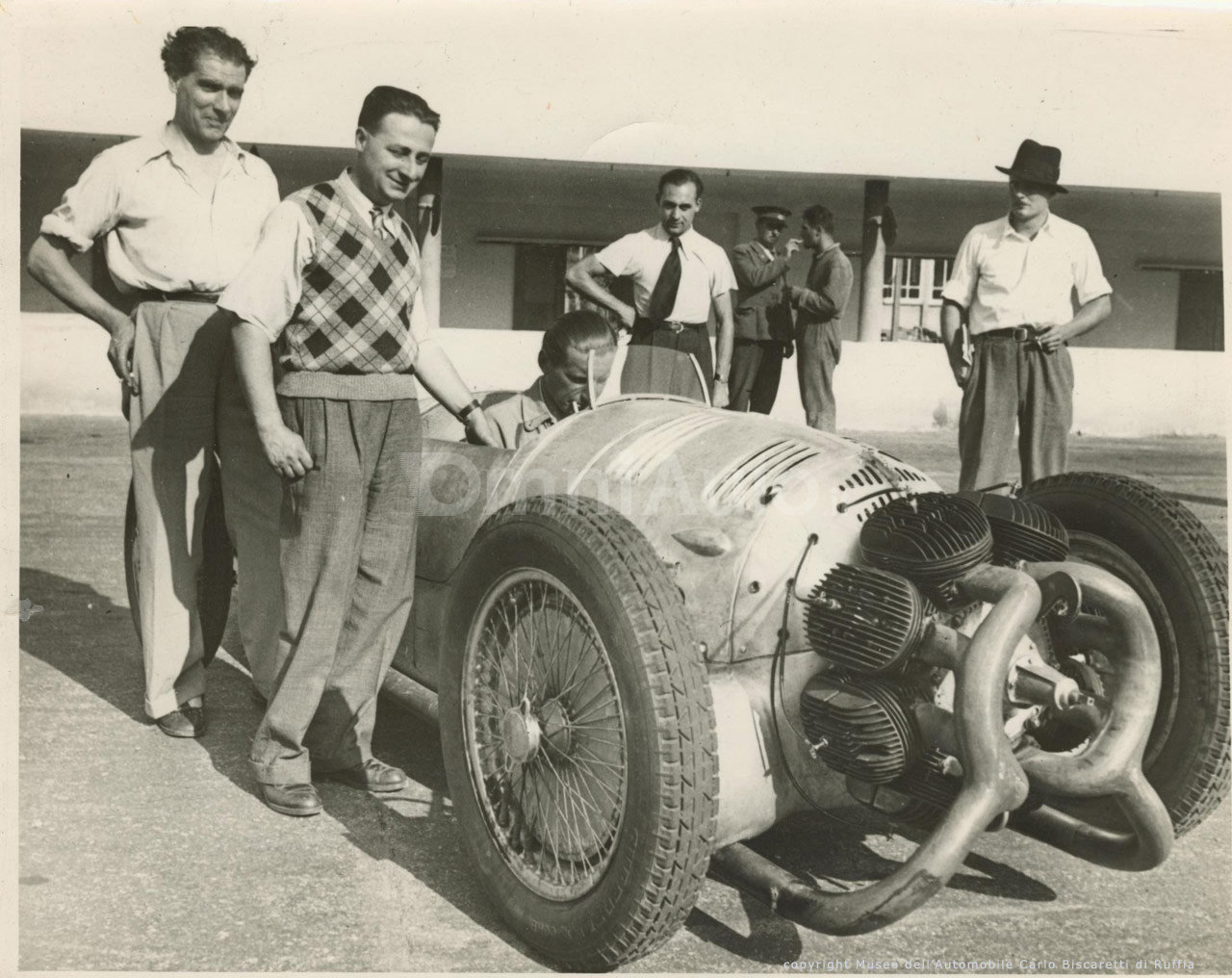
Augusto Monaco (checkered sweater) with the 1935 Trossi-Monaco. Behind wheel is Carlo Felice Trossi.

Augusto Camillo Pietro Monaco (15 March 1903 – 4 November 1997) was an Italian engineer, best known for his racing cars from the early 1930s.

Monaco was born in Buenos Aires, where he earned a degree in engineering before relocating to Turin in the early 1920s, where he made his automobile engineering contributions:

- 1927 Monaco-Baudo with Antonio Baudo, a single-cylinder 500 cm^{3} side-valved engine;
- 1932 Nardi-Monaco with Enrico Nardi, a front-wheeled twin-cylinder JAP engine (998 cm^{3}, 65 bhp) nicknamed Chichibio, and winning several hillclimbs;
- 1935 Trossi-Monaco with Carlo Felice Trossi, a 16-cylinder (250 bhp, 3982 cm^{3}) race car, uncompetitive due to an unsuitable 75/25 weight distribution.

Since then he declined an offer to join Fiat, and among several engineering projects, was involved in developing synthetic diamonds, a Swiss-patented invention (1948). Augusto Monaco moved to Livorno in the early 1960s, where he worked on hydraulic systems until his retirement. He died in Livorno, 1997.
