= Auto Avio Costruzioni 815 =

First car produced by Ferrari

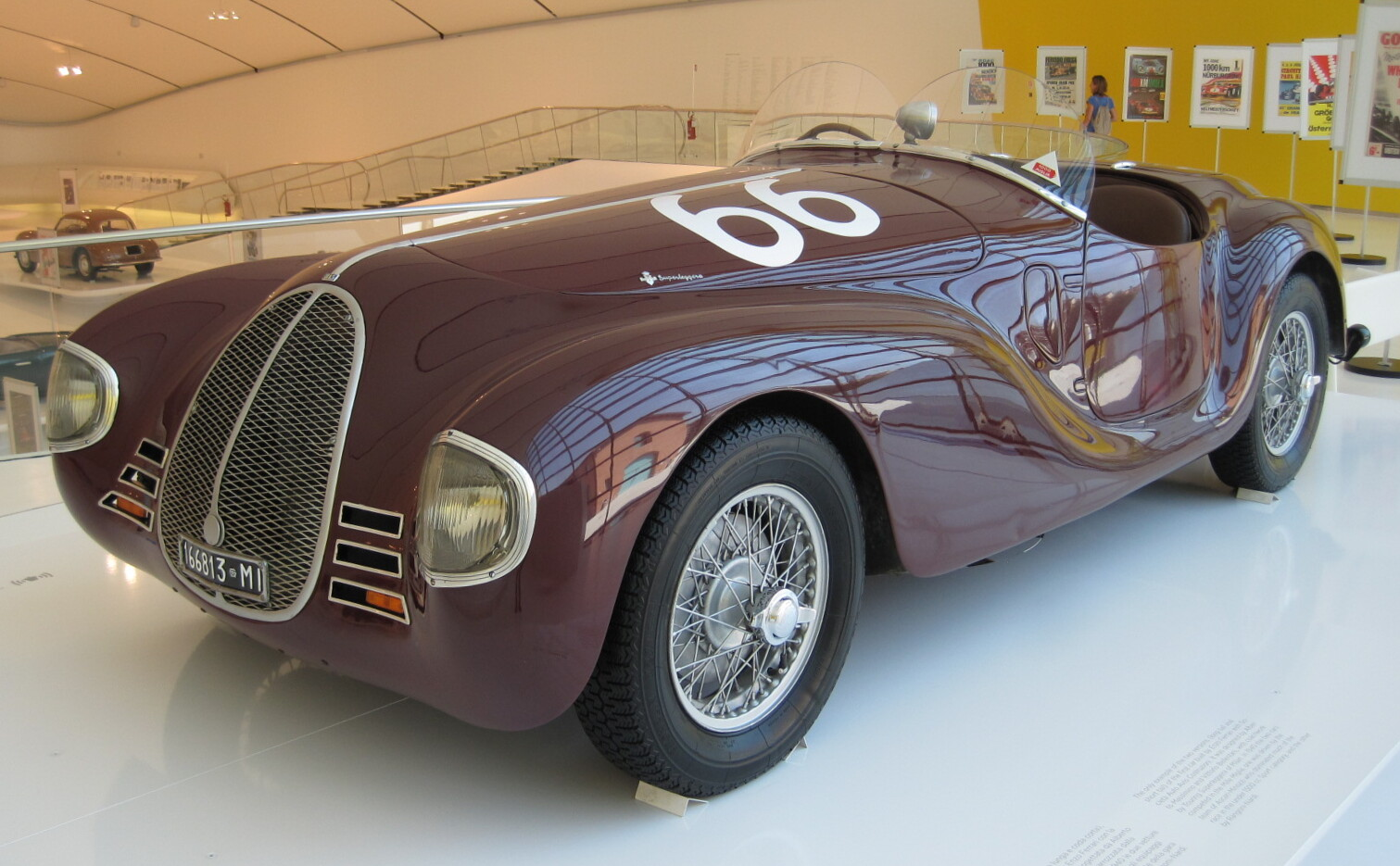
- Auto Avio Costruzioni 815 at the Museo Ferrari

Overview
- Manufacturer: Auto Avio Costruzioni
- Production: 1940; 2 produced
- Assembly: Modena, Italy
- Designer: Alberto Massimino, Vittorio Bellentani

Body and chassis
- Class: Sports car
- Body style: 2-seat barchetta

Powertrain
- Engine: 1.5 L (1496 cc) OHV I8

Dimensions
- Wheelbase: 2,420 mm (95.3 in)
- Curb weight: 625 kg (1,378 lb)

Chronology
- Successor: Ferrari 125 S

The Auto Avio Costruzioni 815 was the first car to be fully designed and built by Enzo Ferrari. Legal issues with former associates Alfa Romeo prevented Ferrari from creating the Ferrari marque. The 815 raced at the 1940 Brescia Grand Prix, where both entries failed to finish due to engine problems. One of the cars was later scrapped, while the other is currently in a car collection in Italy.

== Background ==
In 1938, Ferrari left Alfa Romeo after running Scuderia Ferrari as their racing division. The agreement ending their association forbade Ferrari from restarting Scuderia Ferrari within the next four years. Ferrari then founded Auto Avio Costruzioni (AAC) in Modena to manufacture aircraft parts and machine tools for the Italian government. AAC specialized in the production of hydraulic grinding machines used to produce ball bearings. The company established business partnerships with other Italian firms, including Compagnia Nazionale Aeronautica and Piaggio.

In December 1939, AAC was commissioned by Lotario Rangoni to build and prepare two racing cars for him and Alberto Ascari to drive in the 1940 Mille Miglia. The race, which was officially named the Grand Prix of Brescia, was to be run in April 1940. The resulting car was named the AAC Tipo 815.

== Details ==
The 815 was designed and developed by ex-Alfa Romeo engineers Alberto Massimino and Vittorio Bellentani, advised by test driver Enrico Nardi. The designation "815" was based on the car's eight-cylinder, 1.5 L (1,496 cc) engine bore/stroke of 63 mm × 60 mm (2.48 in × 2.36 in). This engine was largely based on the four-cylinder, 1.1 L engine of the Fiat 508 C Balilla 1100. In concept, it was two 508C engines placed end to end, but it used a specially designed aluminium block built by Fonderia Calzoni in Bologna for integrity and light weight and a five-bearing crankshaft and a camshaft designed and built by AAC to get the traditional straight-8 timing and balance. The compression ratio was increased to 7:1 from 6:1 in the original Fiat engine. The engine used Fiat valve gear, cylinder heads (two 508C heads per engine), and connecting rods. Instead of the two original Fiat distributors, AAC manufactured a single distributor to avoid synchronization issues. The engine was high-tech for the time, with a single camshaft in block, two valves per cylinder, and a semi-dry sump lubrication system. Four Weber 30DR2 carburettors were specified for a total output of 75 hp (56 kW) at 5500 rpm.

The 815 used a Fiat four-speed transmission with the Fiat gears replaced by gears made in-house by AAC. The transmission was integral to the engine block. The car had independent Dubonnet suspension with integral shock absorber at front, with a live axle on semi-elliptic leaf springs and hydraulic shock absorbers at the rear.

As Mille Miglia regulations required that racing car chassis be based on production models, the AAC 815's chassis was also derived from the Fiat 508 C Balilla.

The bodywork was done by Carrozzeria Touring using Itallumag 35, an aluminium/magnesium alloy, and was done in long, flowing forms with integrated wings. The bodywork weighed 119 lb (54 kg). The complete car weighed 625 kg (1,378 lb) and attained a maximum speed close to 170 km/h (110 mph). Chassis 020, built for Rangoni, was fully trimmed in leather and had luxuriously detailed exterior trim, including extra chrome and a recessed fuel filler cap. Ascari's car, 021, was more spartan. Touring also developed a design for a proposed convertible version of the 815. Drawings and a scale model were produced but this was not further developed due to the onset of World War II.

== Performance at 1940 Brescia Grand Prix ==
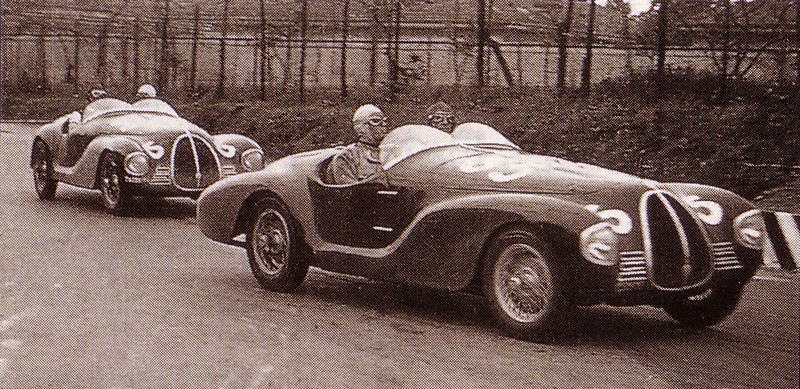
Both AAC 815s at the 1940 Mille Miglia. #65 (front) is Lotario Rangoni and co-driver Enrico Nardi, #66 (back) is Alberto Ascari and co-driver Giovanni Minozzi.

Two 815s, numbers 020 and 021, were completed and entered in the 1940 Brescia Grand Prix, which ran nine laps of a 103 miles (166 km) street circuit. Rangoni and Nardi raced in 020, while Ascari and Giovanni Minozzi raced in 021. Minozzi was Ascari's cousin, who participated in many races during the 1920s and 30s without any major wins. After leading the 1500 cc class in the first lap, Ascari's car developed a broken rocker arm and retired. Rangoni then took the lead, set the lap record for the class, and had a lead of more than half an hour when his engine or rear axle failed after seven laps.

== After the Second World War ==
Further development and production of the 815 was indefinitely stopped when Italy entered World War II on 10 June 1940. During the war years, the company focused on machine tool production, although Enzo Ferrari continued to plan future racing car production.

Car no. 020 was sent to a scrapyard by Lotario Rangoni in 1938, following an accident. Lotario died during the Second World War and his brother, Rolando, inherited the car. Rolando attempted to recover the car from the scrapyard in 1958. After locating the car and confirming its identity with Enzo Ferrari, he returned to collect it only to find it had been crushed during his absence, irreversibly destroying it.

Ascari's car, no. 021, was sold to racer Enrico Beltracchini who raced it in 1947. After selling the car to a museum and then buying it back, Beltracchini sold it again to Mario Righini. As of 2020, Type 815 no. 021 was still in Righini's collection, housed at Castelfranco Emilia near Modena.

Auto Avio Costruzioni 815
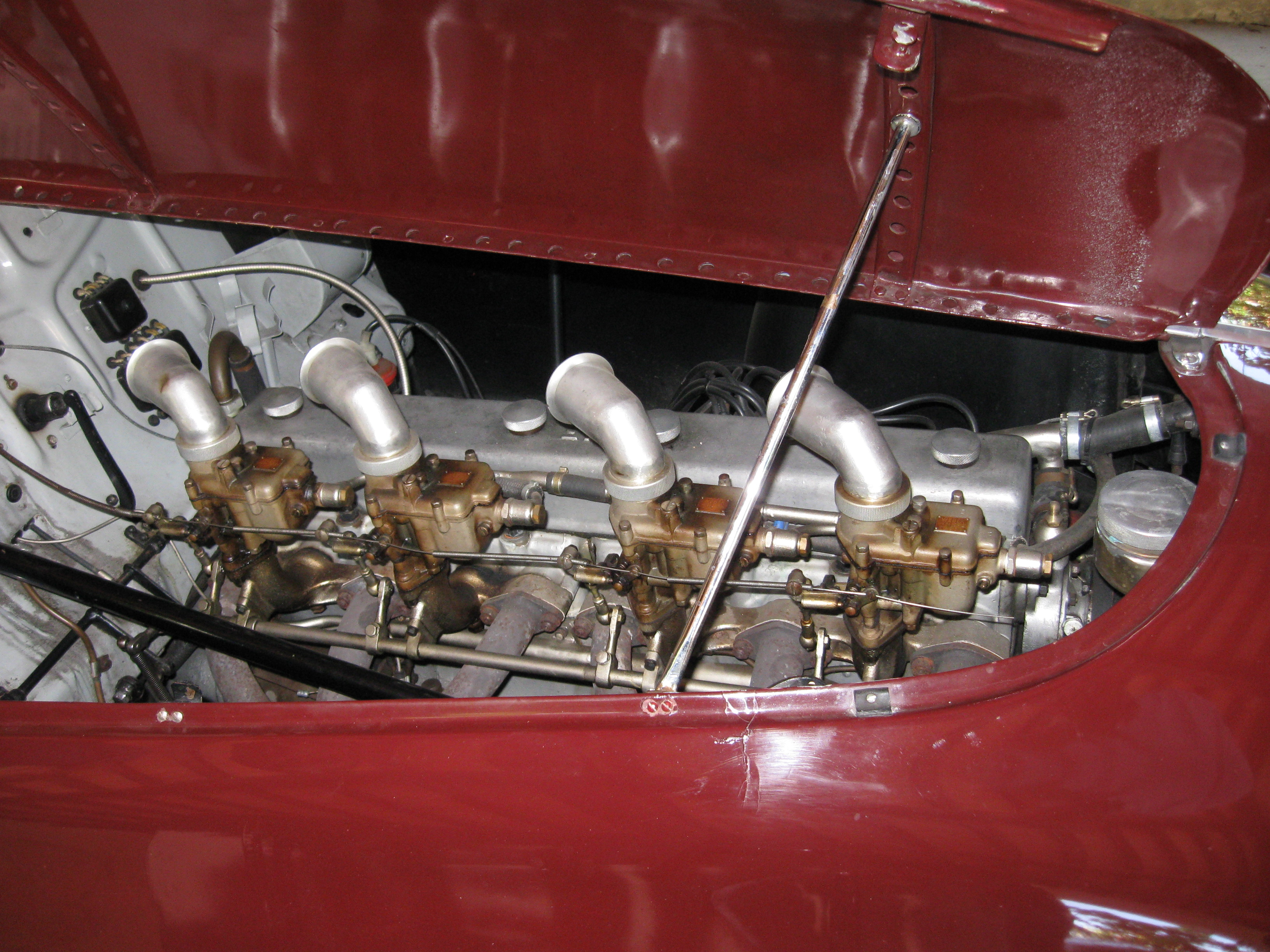
Fiat-based engine in the AAC tipo 815

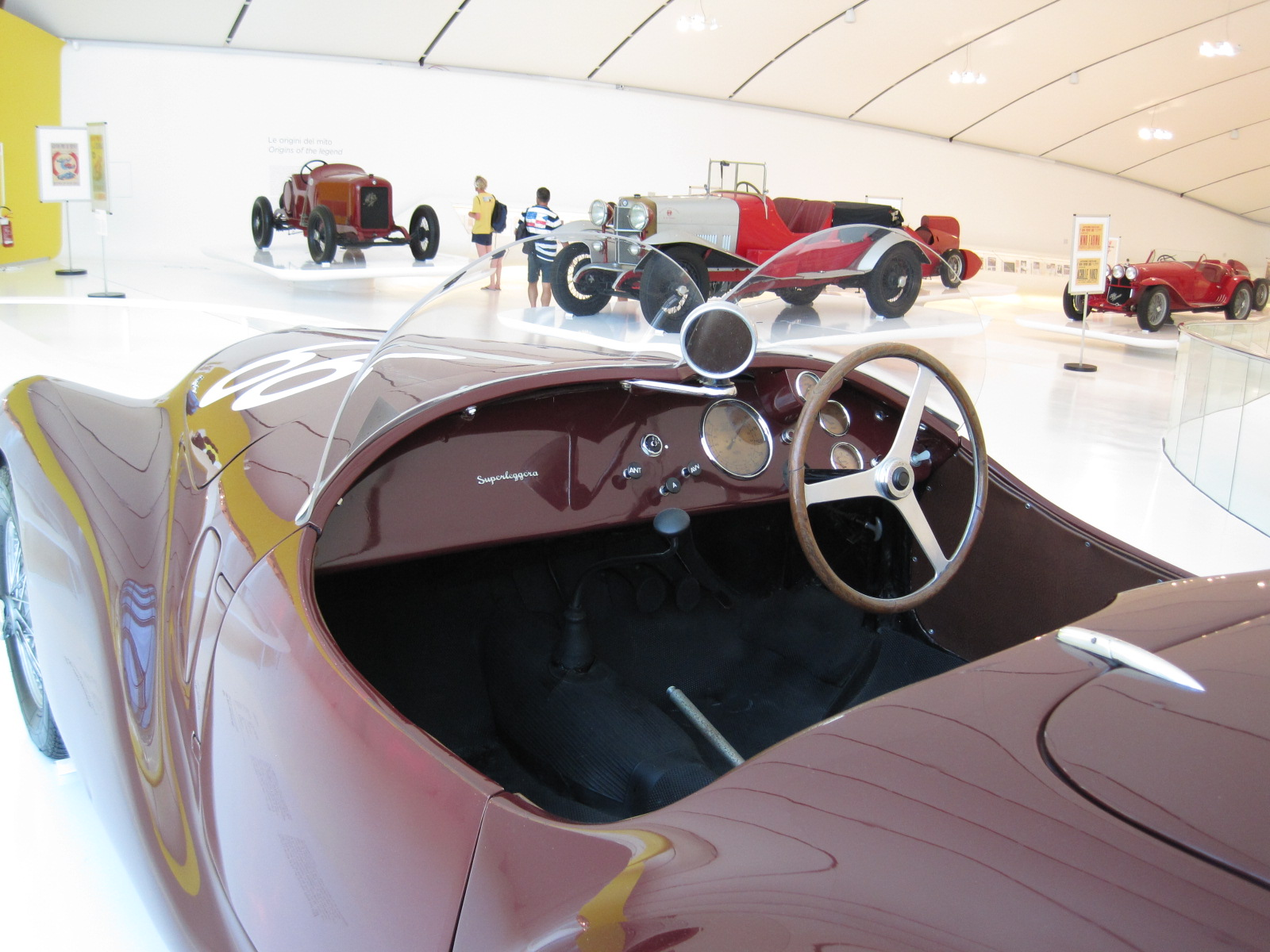
Interior

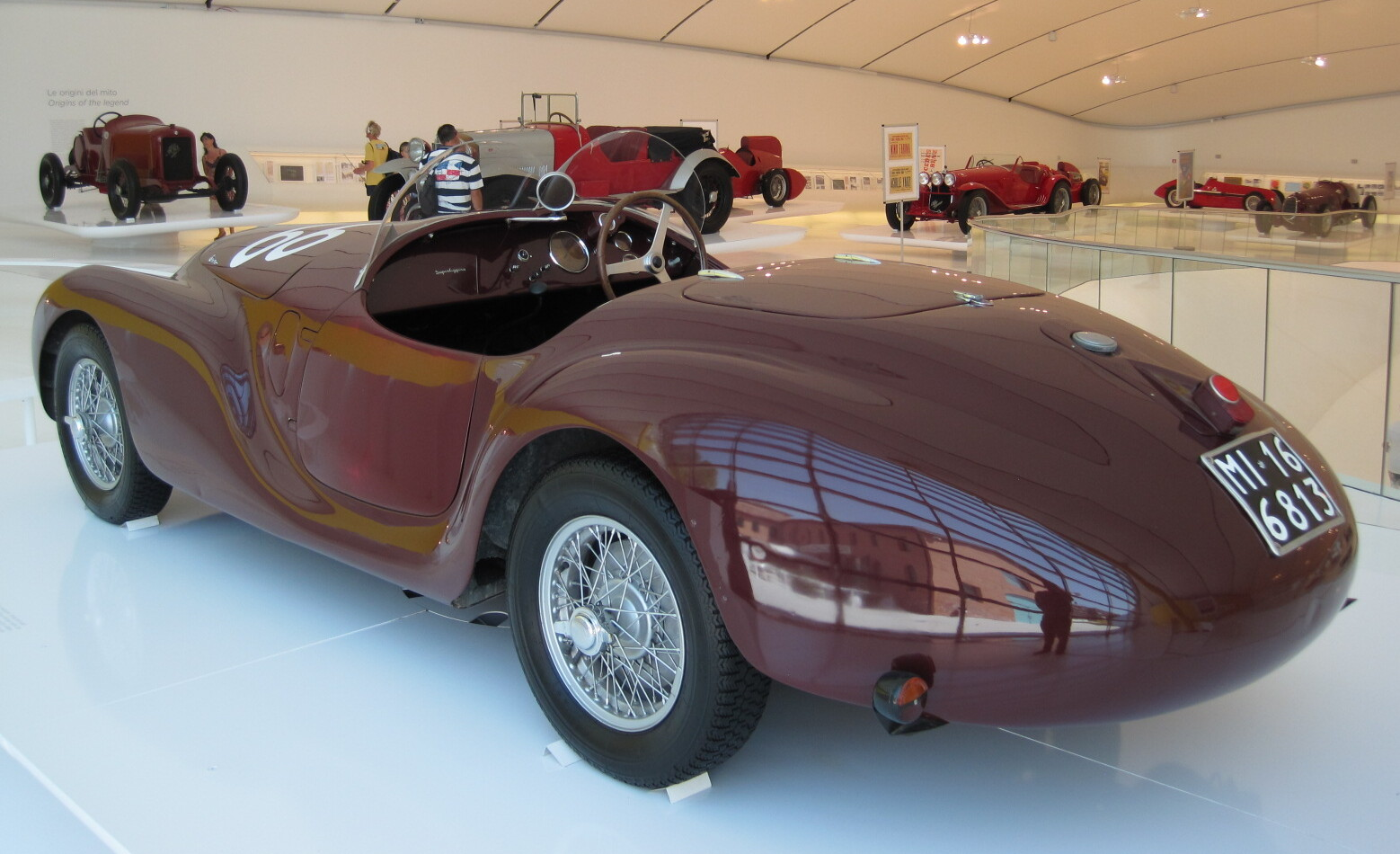
Rear ¾ view
