= Gianni Lancia =

Italian automotive engineer (1924–2014)

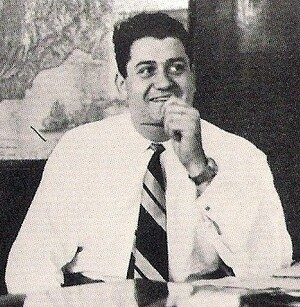
- Born: Giovanni Lancia; 16 November 1924; Fobello, Piedmont, Kingdom of Italy
- Died: 30 June 2014 (aged 89); Turin, Piedmont, Italy
- Occupations: automotive engineer, industrialist and racing enthusiast, CEO of Lancia
- Spouse(s): Maria Luisa Magliola; Jacqueline Sassard
- Children: Mariele Lancia; Vincenzo Lancia; Lorenzo Lancia

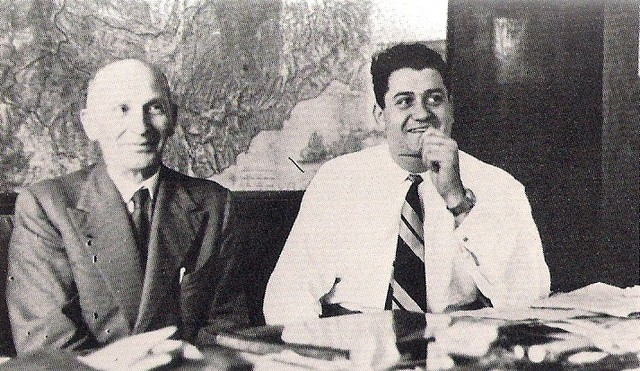
Gianni Lancia to the right of engineer Vittorio Jano.

Gianni Lancia (16 November 1924 – 30 June 2014) was an Italian automobile engineer, industrialist and racing enthusiast, known for running the Lancia carmaker in Turin (1949–55). Born in Fobello (near Biella), he was the older son of Vincenzo Lancia and Adele Miglietti, and brother of Anna Maria and Eleonora.

After his father's death (1937), the young Gianni Lancia took over the family business. Lancia's racing enthusiasm brought him to hire famed engineer and designer Vittorio Jano in 1945. In 1954 Lancia decided to try his luck in the newly-born Formula One world championship and scored a coup when he managed to lure away Alberto Ascari from Scuderia Ferrari. Despite Ascari winning the 1954 Mille Miglia, poor racing results, coupled with Lancia's ambitious plan to put in production several expensive racing prototypes led the company to near-bankruptcy. Following the death of Ascari during a test in May 1955, Lancia and his mother sold their shares in the Lancia company to Carlo Pesenti of Italcementi in June 1956. Gianni Lancia then moved to Brazil, where he ran a canned goods business before returning to Italy in the 1980s. He lately moved to France, settling in the Côte d'Azur region.

Lancia had two sons, Mariele and Vincenzo, from his first marriage, and a son called Lorenzo from his second marriage with the French film-actress Jacqueline Sassard.

He died on 30 June 2014 in Turin.
