= 1954 RAC Tourist Trophy =

The 1954 RAC Tourist Trophy was a motor race for Sports Cars which took place on 11 September 1954 on the roads around Dundrod, (County Antrim, Northern Ireland). It was the 21st RAC Tourist Trophy and the fifth race of the 1954 World Sportscar Championship. The Tourist Trophy was awarded to handicap winners Paul Armagnac and Gérard Laureau driving a D.B. HBR Panhard however the overall race win for championship points was attained by Mike Hawthorn and Maurice Trintignant driving a Ferrari 750 Monza.

Going into the race, Ferrari was leading the World Sportscar Championship by eight points from Lancia. Victory by the Italian marque gave it the title for the second season running.

Dundrod Circuit

== Report ==
=== Entry ===
A grand total of 56 racing cars were registered for this event, of which 52 arrived for practice and qualifying. Unlike 1953, many of the top European teams travelled to Northern Ireland from mainland Europe. Scuderia Ferrari, who could win the World Championship on the streets of County Antrim, entered two Ferrari 750 Monzas for the Le Mans winners José Froilán González and Maurice Trintignant, back-up by Mike Hawthorn and Umberto Maglioli. Hoping the keep the championship alive, Scuderia Lancia sent two of their D24s and two D25s (re-bodied D24s) over. Amongst their line-up was Juan Manuel Fangio and Alberto Ascari. From England, the two work teams of Jaguar Cars Ltd. and Aston Martin. The team from Coventry arrived with three cars, Jaguar D-Types for the all British pairings of Tony Rolt/Duncan Hamilton; Stirling Moss/Peter Walker and Peter Whitehead/Ken Wharton. David Brown also brought along three of his team’s DB3S, with Reg Parnell pairing up alongside Roy Salvadori. Graham Whitehead/Dennis Poore and winners of last year’s RAC Tourist Trophy, Peter Collins/Pat Griffith made up the crew of the other two Astons. Also from England came works entries from Automobiles Frazer Nash, Lotus Engineering, HWM and Kieft Cars. There were joined manufactures teams from Maserati, Osca and Deutsch et Bonnet.

=== Race ===
Following an accident in practice, the Ferrari 750 Monza of González, did not start and Trintignant was transferred into the remaining car of Hawthorn. This resulted in Maglioli also missing out.

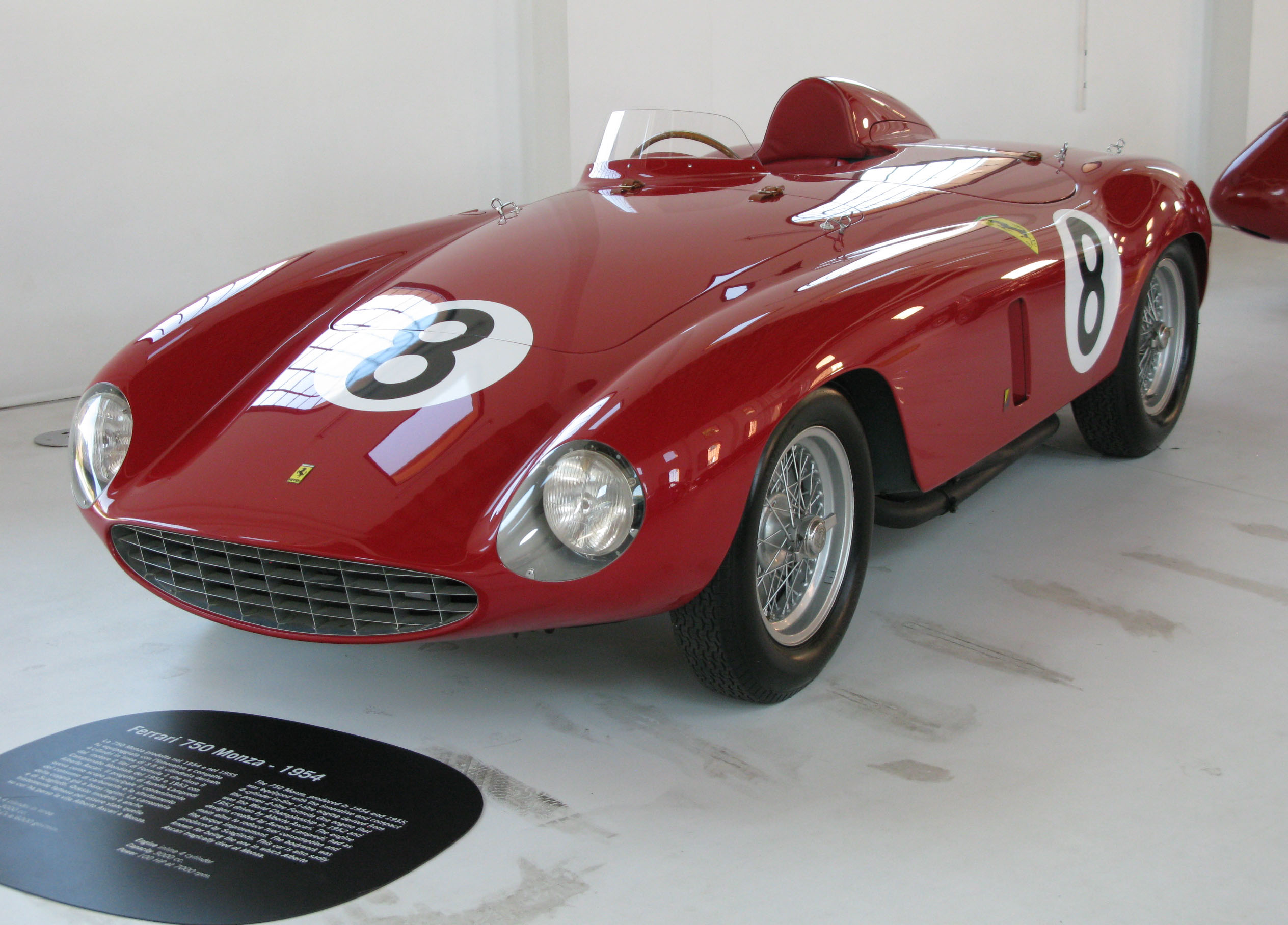
A Ferrari 750 Monza, similar to that driven by Hawthorn/Trintignant

Although World Championship points were awarded based on scratch positions, the race itself was run as a handicap race, so the distance each car needed to complete depended on engine capacity. The race was scheduled for 94 laps, however no car started from scratch, the largest engined vehicles being the Lancias with a handicap of 4 laps and 5 minutes, 11.7 seconds. The race would end after the first car completed 94 handicap laps.

The race was held in drying conditions, but rain returned during the race. Despite this, the Italian teams would finish in the first three places. Car number 15 (Scuderia Ferrari), driven by Mike Hawthorn and Maurice Trintignant took an impressive victory, winning in a time of 7hrs 14:13 mins., averaging a speed of 90.703 mph. Second place went to the Lancia of Piero Taruffi and Juan Manuel Fangio their D24, just 2:16 minutes behind. The podium was completed by another Lancia, that of Robert Manzon and Eugenio Castellotti, two laps adrift. Meanwhile, the HWM Jaguar 108 of George Abecassis and Jim Mayers were the best of the English entrants, finishing in fourth place, with the best of the works-Jaguars further behind in sixth.

This year’s Tourist Trophy could come up with a sport historical particularity. Similar to the 24 Hours of Le Mans, the handicap index rating was extended in the TT. In this rating, power and engine capacity of the vehicle in relation to the weight were set. This led to a handicap for large-displacement vehicles. This index score was extended parallel to the overall rating. Although the overall standings was used for the World Sportscar Championship, the index score was used to the decide the outcome of the Tourist Trophy. Thus this was won by the small D.B. HBR Panhard by Paul Armagnac and Gérard Laureau, who finished only 21st place in the overall standings.

Having won the scratch race, Ferrari gained the necessary points advance over Lancia to take the World Championship for Manufacturers title for the second season in a row, with one round remaining in Mexico. Should Ferrari win the 1954 Carrera Panamericana, they would have the maximum score available due to have the points are awarded, as only the best 4 results out of the 7 races could be retained by each manufacturer.

== Official Classification ==
=== Scratch Race (for Championship points) ===
Class Winners are in Bold text.

Pos	No	Class	Driver		Entrant	Chassis	Laps	Reason Out
1st	**15**	**S3.0**	(United Kingdom) **Mike Hawthorn**	(France) **Maurice Trintignant**	**Scuderia Ferrari**	**Ferrari 750 Monza**	**7hr 14:13, 84**	
2nd	**3**	**S5.0**	(Italy) **Piero Taruffi**	(Argentina) **Juan Manuel Fangio**	**Scuderia Lancia**	**Lancia D24**	**7hr 16:26, 84**	
3rd	4	S5.0	(France) Robert Manzon	(Italy) Eugenio Castellotti	Scuderia Lancia	Lancia D24	7hr 16:27 82	
4th	9	S5.0	(United Kingdom) George Abecassis	(United Kingdom) Jim Mayers	H. W. Motors	HWM Jaguar 108	79	
5th	**57**	**S2.0**	**(Italy) Luigi Musso**	**(Italy) Sergio Mantovani**	**Officine Alfieri Maserati**	**Maserati A6GCS/53**	79	
6th	6	S3.0	(United Kingdom) Ken Wharton	(United Kingdom) Peter Whitehead	Jaguar Car Ltd.	Jaguar D-Type	79	
7th	11	S5.0	(Belgium) Jacques Swaters	(Belgium) Roger Laurent	Ecurie Francorchamps	Jaguar C-Type	78	
8th	19	S3.0	(United Kingdom) Graham Whitehead	(United Kingdom) Dennis Poore	David Brown	Aston Martin DB3S	78	
9th	31	S2.0	(United States) Bob Said	(United States) Masten Gregory	Bob Said	Ferrari 500 Mondial	75	
10th	35	S2.0	(United Kingdom) Alan Brown	(United Kingdom) Mike Keen	Robert J. Chase	Cooper-Bristol T20 Sports	74	
11th	**37**	**S1.5**	**(Republic of Ireland) Redmond Gallagher**	**(United Kingdom) Don Beauman**	**Redmond Gallagher**	**Gordini T15S**	**73**	
12th	32	S2.0	(Republic of Ireland) Dick Odlum	(Republic of Ireland) Cecil Vard	Automobiles Frazer Nash Ltd.	Frazer Nash Le Mans Replicas Mk II	72	
13th	10	S5.0	(Republic of Ireland) Joe Flynn	(Republic of Ireland) Torrie Large	Joe Kelly	Jaguar C-Type	72	
14th	20	S3.0	(United Kingdom) Stirling Moss	(United Kingdom) Peter Walker	Jaguar Cars Ltd.	Jaguar D-Type	71	
15th	39	S1.5	(United Kingdom) Ken McAlpine	(United Kingdom) Jack Fairman	Kenneth McAlpine	Connaught AL/SR	71	
16th	45	S1.5	(United Kingdom) Ian Burgess	(United Kingdom) Tony Palmer-Morewood	Bob Said	Osca MT4 1350	70	
17th	30	S2.0	(Republic of Ireland) Brian McCaldin	(United Kingdom) Charles Eyre-Maunsell	Brian McCaldin	Triumph TR2	69	
18th	27	S2.0	(United Kingdom) John Johnstone	(United Kingdom) Ian Titterington	J.B. Johnstone	Triumph TR2	69	
DNF	1	S5.0	(Italy) Alberto Ascari	(Italy) Luigi Villoresi	Scuderia Lancia	Lancia D25	69	Differential
19th	28	S2.0	(United Kingdom) Ted Lund	(United Kingdom) Tom Blackburn	Ted Lund	Triumph TR2	68	
20th	29	S2.0	(United Kingdom) Bob Dickson	(United Kingdom) W. Ken Richardson	Robert Dickson	Triumph TR2	68	
21st	**52**	**S750**	**(France) Paul Armagnac**	**(France) Gérard Laureau**	**Automobiles Deutsch et Bonnet**	**D.B. HBR Panhard**	**67**	
22nd	25	S2.0	(United Kingdom) Leslie Brooke	(United Kingdom) James Scott Douglas	Leslie Brooke	Triumph TR2	67	
23rd	38	S1.5	(United Kingdom) Raymond Flower	(United Kingdom) Ernie McMillen	Raymond Flower	Porsche 356	66	
24th	26	S2.0	(United Kingdom) Ray Merrick	(United Kingdom) John Maurice Tew	Ray Merrick	Triumph TR2	65	
DISQ	58	S2.0	(Italy) Cesare Perdisa	(Switzerland) Benoît Musy	Officine Alfieri Maserati	Maserati A6GCS	63	Assistance
25th	**47**	**S1.1**	**(United Kingdom) Bob Ferguson**	**(United Kingdom) Alan Rippon**	**Kieft Cars Ltd.**	**Kieft-Climax 1100**	**60**	
NC	23	S2.0	(United Kingdom) Colin Davis	(United Kingdom) Horace Gould	Gilby Engineering	Maserati A6GCS	60	
26th	54	S750	(France) Guy Allegre	(France) Albert Barbey	Marocaine	Panhard Dyna Z	58	
DNF	17	S3.0	(United Kingdom) Reg Parnell	(United Kingdom) Roy Salvadori	David Brown	Aston Martin DB3S	57	Accident
DISQ	22	S2.0	(United Kingdom) J. E. Byrnes	(United Kingdom) Ronnie Adams	J. E. Byrnes	Kieft-Bristol	48	Mechanical
DNF	51	S750	(France) René Bonnet	(France) Élie Bayol	Automobiles Deutsch et Bonnet	D.B. HBR Panhard	47	Accident
DNF	46	S1.1	(United Kingdom) Dick Steed	(United Kingdom) Peter Scott-Russell	Lotus Engineering	Lotus-MG Mark VIII	46	Wheel
DNF	56	S2.0	(Italy) Luigi Bellucci	(Italy) Giorgio Scarlatti	Officine Alfieri Maserati	Maserati A6GCS	37	Cooling system
DNF	5	S5.0	(United Kingdom) Tony Rolt	(United Kingdom) Duncan Hamilton	Jaguar Cars Ltd.	Jaguar D-Type	34	Oil pressure
DNF	49	S1.1	(United Kingdom) Peter Reece	(United Kingdom) Jackie G. Reece	Giacomo Caprara	Osca MT4 1100	33	Accident
DNF	36	S1.5	(United Kingdom) Jack Westcott	(United Kingdom) Tommy Bridger	Kieft Cars Ltd.	Kieft-MG	32	Gearbox
DNF	42	S1.5	(South Africa) Nigel Allen	(United Kingdom) Mike Anthony	Lotus Engineering	Lotus-MG Mark VIII	20	Track rod
DNF	50	S1.1	(West Germany) Harry Merkel	(West Germany) Luc Buchberger	Harry Merkel	Porsche 550	19	DNF
DNF	18	S3.0	(United Kingdom) Peter Collins	(United Kingdom) Pat Griffith	David Brown	Aston Martin DB3S	15	Final drive
DNF	41	S1.5	(United Kingdom) Colin Chapman	(United Kingdom) Michael Costin	Lotus Engineering	Lotus-MG Mark VIII	15	Accident
DNF	43	S1.5	(United Kingdom) Brian Naylor	(United Kingdom) George Pitt	Brian Naylor	Cooper-MG T29	15	Engine
DNF	55	S750	(France) Pascal Berinstein	(France) Georges Trouis	Franco-Brittanique	D.B. HBR Panhard	14	DNF
DNF	16	S3.0	(Republic of Ireland) Joe Kelly	(United Kingdom) Desmond Titterington	Joe Kelly	Ferrari 750 Monza	13	Gearbox
DNF	53	S750	(France) Jean Lucas	(Switzerland) Jean-Pierre Feuz	Automobiles Deutsch et Bonnet	D.B. HBR Renault	13	DNF
DNF	2	S5.0	(Argentina) Juan Manuel Fangio	(Italy) Eugenio Castellotti	Scuderia Lancia	Lancia D25	11	Engine, oil leak
DNF	8	S5.0	(Australia) Tony Gaze	(United Kingdom) John Riseley-Prichard	H. W. Motors	HWM Jaguar 105	9	Engine
DNF	21	S2.0	(Italy) Roberto Sgorbati	(United Kingdom) Lance Macklin	Automobili Osca	Osca 2000S	9	Ignition
DNF	34	S2.0	(United Kingdom) Peter Wilson	(United Kingdom) Tony Brooks	Henry Ohara Moore	Frazer Nash Sebring	9	DNF
DNF	48	S1.1	(United Kingdom) Don Parker	(United Kingdom) David Boshier-Jones	Kieft Cars Ltd	Kieft-Climax 1100	6	Suspension
DNF	44	S1.5	(United Kingdom) Peter Jackson	(United Kingdom) Peter Lane	Peter Jackson	Cooper-MG T29	5	Engine
DNS	14	S3.0	(Argentina) José Froilán González	(France) Maurice Trintignant	Scuderia Ferrari	Ferrari 750 Monza		Accident in practice

- Fastest Lap: Mike Hawthorn, 4:49.000secs (92.916 mph)

=== Scratch Race - Class Winners ===
Class	Winners		
Sports 5000	3	Lancia D24	Taruffi / Fangio
Sports 3000	15	Ferrari 750 Monza	Hawthorn / Trintignant
Sports 2000	57	Maserati A6GCS/53	Musso / Mantovani
Sports 1500	37	Gordini T15S	Gallagher / Beauman
Sports 1100	47	Kieft-Climax 1100	Ferguson / Rippon
Sports 750	52	D.B. HBR Panhard	Armagnac / Laureau

=== Overall Positions (Handicap event / adjusted result) ===
Top Six :

Pos	No	Class	Driver		Entrant	Chassis	Laps
1st	52	S750	(France) Paul Armagnac	(France) Gérard Laureau	Automobiles Deutsch et Bonnet	D.B. HBR Panhard	94
2nd	15	S3.0	(United Kingdom) Mike Hawthorn	(France) Maurice Trintignant	Scuderia Ferrari	Ferrari 750 Monza	90
3rd	57	S2.0	(Italy) Luigi Musso	(Italy) Sergio Mantovani	Officine Alfieri Maserati	Maserati A6GCS/53	89
4th	3	S5.0	(Italy) Piero Taruffi	(Argentina) Juan Manuel Fangio	Scuderia Lancia	Lancia D24	89
5th	6	S3.0	(United Kingdom) Ken Wharton	(United Kingdom) Peter Whitehead	Jaguar Car Ltd.	Jaguar D-Type	87
6th	4	S5.0	(France) Robert Manzon	(Italy) Eugenio Castellotti	Scuderia Lancia	Lancia D24	87

== Standings after the race ==
Pos	Championship	Points
1	(Italy) Ferrari	30
2	(Italy) Lancia	20
3	(United Kingdom) Jaguar	10
4	(Italy) O.S.C.A.	8
5	(Italy) Maserati	7

- Note: Only the top five positions are included in this set of standings.

Championship points were awarded for the first six places in each race in the order of 8-6-4-3-2-1. Manufacturers were only awarded points for their highest finishing car with no points awarded for positions filled by additional cars. Only the best four results out of the six races could be retained by each manufacturer.

World Sportscar Championship
Previous race: 24 hours of Le Mans	1954 season	Next race: 1954 Carrera Panamericana
