= 1953 RAC Tourist Trophy =

The 1953 RAC Tourist Trophy was a motor race for sports cars, held on 5 September 1953 at the Dundrod Circuit in County Antrim, Northern Ireland. It was the sixth round of the 1953 World Sportscar Championship, held just six days after the previous round, the 1000km of Nürburgring. The race was the 20th running of the RAC Tourist Trophy.

The race was won by Peter Collins and Pat Griffith, driving an Aston Martin DB3S.

Dundrod Circuit

== Background ==
The race took place on Saturday 5 September, with Practice taking place on the Thursday and Friday before the race. The race distance was set at 111 laps with two drivers taking part for each entrant, with each driver being required to drive at least a third of the car's eventual distance in the event in order to be classified. The overall winner of the event would receive the Tourist Trophy and £500 (equivalent to £12,128 in 2025). In each class, first place would receive £200 (equivalent to £4,851 in 2025) and second place would receive £100 (equivalent to £2,426 in 2025).

== Report ==
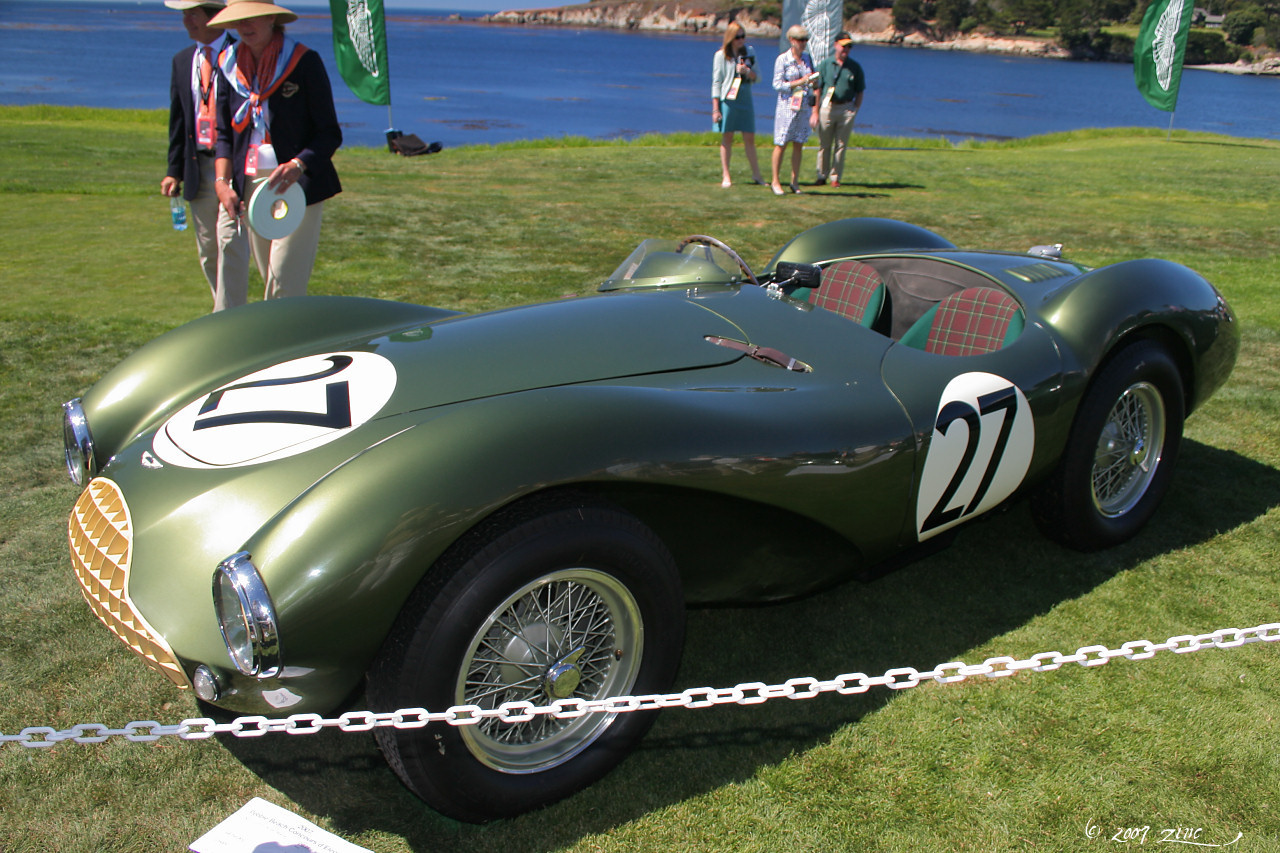
The race was won by an Aston Martin DB3S, similar to the car pictured

=== Entry ===
The event's entrants list should have been closed on 15 August, but due to a strike in France, the entry list couldn't be closed until 24 August. A total of 45 cars were initially registered for the event on 24 August. However, many teams decided to withdraw their registrations. These included the private Jaguar entrants of J. B. Swift and T. H. Wisdom, the Porsche's due to recent crashes in races at the weekend before the event. The Italian Stanguellini cars were withdrawn, potentially due to a shortage of cars due to recent crashes. Only 28 entrants arrived for practice and qualifying. None of the leading works teams made the trip across to Northern Ireland from mainland Europe. However, from England, the two works teams of Jaguar Cars Ltd. and Aston Martin took part. The team from Coventry arrived with three cars, Jaguar C-Types for the all British pairings of Tony Rolt/Duncan Hamilton, Stirling Moss/Peter Walker, and Peter Whitehead/Ian Stewart. Aston Martin also brought along three of their DB3S, with Reg Parnell pairing up alongside Eric Thompson. Roy Salvadori/Dennis Poore and Peter Collins/Pat Griffith made up the crew of the other two Astons. Also from England came three works entered Frazer Nash Le Mans Mk IIs and Kieft-Bristols.

Going into this round, Ferrari were leading the Manufacturers Championship by just two points from Jaguar. With no representation in the race, Ferrari would be unable score any points, but due to the nature of the scoring system where only the best four results out of the seven races could be retained by each manufacturer, Jaguar would need to finish at least second to score any points, with only one race remaining in the championship- the Carrera Panamericana in Mexico some 2 1/2 months away.

=== Race ===
Although World Championship points were awarded based on scratch order, this race was run as a handicap race. The race was run over 111 laps, but no cars started from scratch: the largest cars, the Jaguars, had a handicap of 4 laps and 5 minutes, 11.21 seconds. The race would end once any car completed 111 handicap laps.

Conditions of the race were foggy. Despite this, Aston Martin would finish in first and second places, both cars on the same lap. Car number 20, driven by Collins and Griffith took an impressive victory, winning in a time of 9hrs 37:12 mins., averaging a speed of 81.715 mph. Second place went to Parnell and Thompson, in their DB3S, just 3:23 minutes behind. The podium was completed by the winner of the two previous Tourist Trophy races held at Dundrod, Moss, aided by his co-driver, Walker, in their Jaguar C-Type.

== Scratch Classification ==
Class Winners are in Bold text.

| Pos | No | Class | Driver | | Entrant | Chassis | Laps | Reason Out |
|---|---|---|---|---|---|---|---|---|
| 1st | **20** | **S3.0** | (United Kingdom) **Peter Collins** | (United Kingdom) **Pat Griffith** | **Aston Martin** | **Aston Martin DB3S** | **9hr 37:12, 106** | |
| 2nd | 18 | S3.0 | (United Kingdom) Reg Parnell | (United Kingdom) Eric Thompson | Aston Martin | Aston Martin DB3S | 9hr 40:35, 106 | |
| 3rd | **7** | **S5.0** | **(United Kingdom) Stirling Moss** | **(United Kingdom) Peter Walker** | **Jaguar Cars Ltd.** | **Jaguar C-Type** | **9hr 37:39, 103** | |
| 4th | 22 | S3.0 | (Australia) Tony Gaze | (United Kingdom) Graham Whitehead | Graham Whitehead | Aston Martin DB3 | 102 | |
| 5th | 21 | S3.0 | (United Kingdom) Bob Dickson | (United Kingdom) Desmond Titterington | Bob Dickson | Aston Martin DB3 | 101 | |
| 6th | **25** | **S2.0** | **(United Kingdom) Ken Wharton** | **(United Kingdom) C. Ernie Robb** | **Frazer Nash Ltd.** | **Frazer Nash Le Mans MK II** | 101 | |
| 7th | 12 | S5.0 | (Republic of Ireland) Joe Kelly | (United Kingdom) Jack Fairman | Joe Kelly | Jaguar C-Type | 98 | |
| 8th | 27 | S2.0 | (United Kingdom) Bob Gerard | (United Kingdom) David Clarke | Frazer Nash Ltd. | Frazer Nash Le Mans | 95 | |
| 9th | **36** | **S1.5** | **(Republic of Ireland) Pearse Cahill** | **(Republic of Ireland) Redmond Gallagher** | **Redmond Gallagher** | **Gordini T15S** | **86** | |
| 10th | 40 | S1.5 | (United Kingdom) Peter Jackson | (United Kingdom) Peter Lane | Peter Jackson | Lester-MG T51 | 86 | |
| 11th | 28 | S2.0 | (United Kingdom) Rodney F. Peacock | (United Kingdom) Gerry Ruddock | Roy Peacock | Fraser Nash Le Mans | 82 | |
| 12th | 44 | S1.5 | (United Kingdom) Raymond Flower | (United Kingdom) George Phillips | Gregor Grant | MG TD | 81 | |
| 13th | 35 | S1.5 | (United Kingdom) Peter Reece | (United Kingdom) Gillie Tyrer | Peter Reece | Singer SM1500 | 81 | |
| 14th | **49** | **S750** | **(France) Georges Trouis** | **(United Kingdom) Alfred Hitchings** | **Ecurie Jendy Bonnet** | **D.B. HBR Panhard** | **74** | |
| DNF | 33 | S2.0 | (United Kingdom) C. P. Hazelhurst | (United Kingdom) P. H. Thompson | Kieft Cars | Kieft-Bristol | 62 | Accident |
| DNF | 50 | S750 | (France) M. Pousse | (United Kingdom) Jeff Sparrowe | Ecurie Jendy Bonnet | Panhard Dyna Junior | 59 | DNF |
| DNF | 8 | S5.0 | (United Kingdom) Peter Whitehead | (United Kingdom) Ian Stewart | Jaguar Cars Ltd. | Jaguar C-Type | 51 | Gearbox |
| DNF | 34 | S2.0 | (United Kingdom) Ian Burgess | (United Kingdom) Austen Nurse | Kieft Cars | Kieft-Bristol | 46 | DNF |
| DNF | 32 | S2.0 | (United States) John Fitch | (United Kingdom) Peter Wilson | Frazer Nash Ltd. | Fraser Nash Le Mans Replica Mk II | 44 | Lost Wheel |
| DNF | 30 | S2.0 | (United Kingdom) Lawrence Mitchell | (United Kingdom) Peter Scott-Russell | Lawrence Mitchell | Fraser Nash High Speed | 42 | Accident |
| DNF | 19 | S3.0 | (United Kingdom) Roy Salvadori | (United Kingdom) Dennis Poore | Aston Martin | Aston Martin DB3S | 33 | Accident |
| DNF | 43 | S1.5 | (Republic of Ireland) Brian McCaldin | (United Kingdom) Charles Eyre-Maunsell | Brian McCaldin | MG TD | 29 | Bearings |
| DNF | 41 | S1.5 | (United Kingdom) Ted Lund | (United Kingdom) William Robinson | Ted Lund | Jowett Jupiter | 15 | Suspension |
| DNF | 32 | S2.0 | (United Kingdom) David J. Calvert | (United Kingdom) Richard Green | Kieft Cars | Kieft-Bristol | 10 | Accident |
| DNF | 6 | S5.0 | (United Kingdom) Tony Rolt | (United Kingdom) Duncan Hamilton | Jaguar Cars Ltd. | Jaguar C-Type | 5 | Gearbox |
| DNF | 39 | S1.5 | (United Kingdom) Horace Gould | (United Kingdom) I.D. Lewis | Horace Gould | Cooper-MG T21 | 2 | Steering |
| DNF | 14 | S5.0 | (Kenya) John Manussis | (United Kingdom) Gerry Dunham | Ecurie Kenya | Jaguar C-Type | 1 | Accident |
| DNS | 17 | S5.0 | (United Kingdom) George Abecassis | (United Kingdom) Lance Macklin | H W Motors | HWM-Jaguar 108 | | Axel shaft |

- Fastest Lap: Peter Walker, 5:01.000secs (89.213 mph)

=== Class Winners ===
| Class | Winners | | |
|---|---|---|---|
| Class C – Sports 5000 | 7 | Jaguar C-Type | Moss / Walker |
| Class D - Sports 3000 | 20 | Aston Martin DB3S | Collins / Griffith |
| Class E – Sports 2000 | 25 | Frazer Nash Le Mans Mk II | Wharton / Robb |
| Class F – Sports 1500 | 36 | Gordini T15S | Cahill / Gallagher |
| Class H – Sports 750 | 49 | D.B. HBR Panhard | Trouis / Hitchings |

== Standings after the race ==
| Pos | Championship | Points |
|---|---|---|
| 1 | (Italy) Ferrari | 26 (27) |
| 2 | (United Kingdom) Jaguar | 24 (28) |
| 3 | (United Kingdom) Aston Martin | 16 |
| 4 | (United States) Cunningham | 12 |
| 5 | (Italy) Alfa Romeo | 6 |

- Note: Only the top five positions are included in this set of standings. Championship points were awarded for the first six places in each race in the order of 8-6-4-3-2-1. Manufacturers were only awarded points for their highest finishing car with no points awarded for positions filled by additional cars. Only the best 4 results out of the 7 races could be retained by each manufacturer. Points earned but not counted towards the championship totals are listed within brackets in the above table.

World Sportscar Championship
| Previous race: 1000km of Nürburgring | 1953 season | Next race: Carrera Panamericana |
