= Eric Thompson (racing driver) =

British racing driver (1919–2015)

- Born: 4 November 1919; Ditton Hill, Surbiton, Surrey, England, UK
- Died: 22 August 2015 (aged 95); Guildford, Surrey

Formula One World Championship career
- Nationality: (United Kingdom) British
- Active years: 1952
- Team: Connaught Engineering
- Entries: 1
- Championships: 0
- Wins: 0
- Podiums: 0
- Career points: 2
- Pole positions: 0
- Fastest laps: 0
- First entry: 1952 British Grand Prix
24 Hours of Le Mans career
- Years: 1949–1955
- Teams: HRG; Aston Martin; Lagonda; Connaught Engineering
- Best finish: 3rd (1951)
- Class wins: 2 (1949 & 1951)

Eric David Thompson (4 November 1919 – 22 August 2015) was a British racing driver, book dealer and insurance broker. He participated in sports car racing between 1949 and 1955 taking his greatest success by finishing third in the 1951 Les 24 Heures du Mans and took part in the 1952 RAC British Grand Prix.

Thompson worked as a broker for Lloyd's of London. His racing career started in 1948, racing cars for HRG. He won the 1.5-litre class in the Les 24 Heures du Mans in 1949 and drove for Aston Martin driving a DB2 to third place in the 1951 24 Hours of Le Mans. He also drove in Formula Libre, RAC Tourist Trophy and Formula Two achieving minor success. He took part in his only Formula One race in the 1952 RAC British Grand Prix finishing fifth, and later spent more time working at Lloyd's. He retired from motor racing at the end of 1955. Thompson resigned from Lloyd's in the 1980s and became a dealer of rare books on motorsport.

== Biography ==
=== Early life ===
Thompson was born on 4 November 1919 in Ditton Hill, Surrey. In his childhood he developed an interest in motorsport, becoming a fan of Richard Seaman. After leaving secondary school, Thompson found a job at Lloyd's of London as a broker. The work was well paid and required commitment, loyalty and long hours of work. Thompson won many awards for his effort and during the Second World War saw active service.

=== Career ===
After the war ended, Thompson decided to pursue his passion of motor racing. He began his racing career in 1948 at the age of 28 and was well funded. Thompson continued to work at Lloyd's of London and was entitled to two weeks of holiday, with every third weekend off, when he raced. His first race was the 12 Heures de Paris held at the Autodrome de Linas-Montlhéry in a shared drive with Robin Richards driving an HRG, finishing fourth in the 1.5-litre class and 17th overall.

In 1949, Thompson made his debut in the Les 24 Heures du Mans with HRG sharing his drive with Jack Fairman. The pairing won the 1.5-litre class and finished eighth overall. They later entered the 24 Hours of Belgium, at the Circuit de Spa-Francorchamps where he clinched victory in their class. Thompson also won two handicap races at Goodwood. Thompson later took a class win in the Silverstone International Trophy and finished sixth in his class in the Prescott Hillclimb. In 1950 he joined Aston Martin and gave support to three drivers: Reg Parnell, Peter Collins and Roy Salvadori.

Thompson's first race for Aston Martin was a one-hour race held at Silverstone where he finished fourth in his class and 14th overall. He also took part in the 1950 24 Heures du Mans sharing an Aston Martin DB2 with John Gordon but was forced out after nine laps due to engine failure. Thompson also raced with HRG and secured a class win finishing second overall at Blandford, third in a Goodwood Handicap and clinched a class win at the Cambridge University Sprint at Bedwell Hey. In the same year, Thompson made his debut in Formula Three driving a Cooper-Vincent at Castle Combe where he retired.

In 1951, Thompson competed prominently in open-wheel racing. He competed in the Goodwood Lavant Cup in a Cooper finishing fifth and finished in the same position in a Bugatti Type 51 in a Boreham Libre event. He later competed in an ERA/Delage and Delahaye and other Libre races, and took part in sports car events with an Aston Martin DB2 in the RAC Tourist Trophy where he finished third in his class and eighth overall. For the works team, Thompson shared a DB2 with Lance Macklin in the Les 24 Heures du Mans where the pair clinched victory in the 3-litre class and finished third overall.

In 1952, Thompson took part in his third Les 24 Heures du Mans driving an Aston Martin DB3 alongside Parnell but retired from transmission problems. The pair suffered a further retirement from the Goodwood Nine Hours when, during the race, the car being driven by Thompson entered the pitlane with smoke coming out of the car and Parnell was not prepared to take over the seat. Parnell grabbed Thompson by the arm and dragged him out before the car caught fire. Throughout the year he drove a DB2 entered by Peter Walker, clinching two victories in handicap events at Goodwood and one at Snetterton with a seventh and eighth at the same circuit. He later took third in class at the CUAC Bottisham Sprint. Thompson took second, seventh and tenth in races at Snetterton, third at Boreham and Castle Combe driving an ERA/Delage and fifth in a private ERA at the British Grand Prix Libre event.

=== Formula One ===
Thompson entered a works Connaught for the 1952 RAC British Grand Prix with a Lea-Francis engine and qualified the car ninth on the grid. In the race, he made up a position when Gordini driver Robert Manzon was forced to retire with a clutch problem. He managed to finish in fifth place, three laps behind race winner Alberto Ascari and ahead of 1950 World Drivers' Champion Giuseppe Farina, and behind teammate Dennis Poore.

=== After Formula One ===
Thompson participated in the 1953 Les 24 Heures du Mans in an Aston Martin DB3S with Poore with the pairing retiring with ignition failure after 182 laps. Parnell and Thompson took part in the Goodwood Nine Hours with Parnell driving in the first stint and Thompson for the next 70 laps. Parnell took over after 77 laps and suffered a puncture 22 laps later. After pitting, Parnell drove another 53 laps with Thompson taking over at 21:45. After problems with the clutch, Thompson rejoined with 2 hours and 15 minutes remaining. The pairing eventually won the race. They both took part in that year's Tourist Trophy where they finished second.

Thompson took a second-place finish at Thruxton and drove an Aston Martin DB2 to fifth in the Goodwood Easter Handicap and took sixth in a Libre race driving an Aston Martin DB3, but was forced to retire from the 6-hour relay at Silverstone. He took part in single seater races driving a Connaught A-Type to two victories in Snetterton and second in a Libre race in the Formula Two Championship.

In 1954, Thompson reduced his commitment in the national motor racing scene. He spent the year driving an Aston Martin DB2 and contested the Les 24 Heures du Mans in a Lagonda DP115 with Poore. The pairing retired following a crash after 25 laps. In 1955, Thompson announced his retirement from motor racing due to pressure from his job and drove in his final Les 24 Heures du Mans where he retired with engine problems after 60 laps. He also drove in the Goodwood Nine Hours in a Connaught-Lea-Francis ALSR pairing with Kenneth McAlpine, finishing 16th. Thompson's final competitive race was in 1956 at the CUAC Speed Trials, driving a 498cc Jason to second in his class.

=== Later life ===
After announcing his retirement from motor racing, Thompson concentrated on his work at Lloyd's. He resigned his job in the 1980s and opened a bookshop near Guildford, selling rare books on the history of motor racing. Thompson also made occasional appearances at historic festivals. He became the first driver to be inducted into the Le Mans Drivers Hall of Fame in 2013.

== Racing record ==
=== Career highlights ===
Season	Series	Position	Team	Car
1951	Les 24 Heures du Mans	3rd	Aston Martin	Aston Martin DB2
1952	FIA Formula One World Championship	16th	Connaught Engineering	Connaught-Lea Francis A
1953	Aston Martin Owners Club F2 Race	1st		Connaught A
1953	9 Hours of Goodwood	1st	David Brown	Aston Martin DB3S
1953	RedeX Trophy	1st		Connaught A
1953	Tourist Trophy	2nd	Aston Martin	Aston Martin DB3S
1953	AMOC Trophy	3rd		Connaught A

=== Complete World Championship Grand Prix results ===
(key)

Year	Entrant	Chassis	Engine	1	2	3	4	5	6	7	8	WDC	Points
1952	Connaught Engineering	Connaught Type A	Lea-Francis Straight-4	SUI	500	BEL	FRA	GBR; 5	GER	NED	ITA	16th	2

=== Complete 24 Hours of Le Mans results ===
Year	Team	Co-Drivers	Car	Class	Laps	Pos.	Class Pos.
1949	Ecurie Lapin Blanc	(United Kingdom) Jack Fairman	HRG Lightweight	S1.5	202	8th	1st
1950	(United Kingdom) Aston Martin Ltd.	(United Kingdom) John Gordon	Aston Martin DB2	S3.0	8	DNF; Engine	
1951	(United Kingdom) Aston Martin Ltd.	(United Kingdom) Lance Macklin	Aston Martin DB2	S3.0	257	3rd	1st
1952	(United Kingdom) Aston Martin Ltd.	(United Kingdom) Reg Parnell	Aston Martin DB3S	S3.0		DNF; Transmission	
1953	(United Kingdom) Aston Martin Ltd.	(United Kingdom) Dennis Poore	Aston Martin DB3S	S3.0	182	DNF; Ignition	
1954	(United Kingdom) David Brown	(United Kingdom) Dennis Poore	Lagonda DP115	S5.0	26	DNF; Accident	
1955	(United Kingdom) Connaught Engineering	(United Kingdom) Kenneth McAlpine	Connaught AL/SR	S1.5	60	DNF; Engine	

=== Complete 24 Hours of Spa results ===
Year	Team	Co-Drivers	Car	Class	Laps	Pos.	Class Pos.
1949	Ecurie Lapin Blanc	(United Kingdom) Jack Fairman	HRG Lightweight	S1.5		10th	1st

=== Complete 12 Hours of Paris results ===
Year	Team	Co-Drivers	Car	Class	Pos.	Class Pos.
1948	Ecurie Lapin Blanc	(United Kingdom) Robin Richards	HRG-Singer 1100	1.1	17th	4th
