= Pat Griffith =

English racing driver

- Nationality: (United Kingdom) British
- Born: 26 April 1925 Weybridge, Surrey, England
- Died: 28 January 1980 (aged 53) Vale Royal, Cheshire, England
24 Hours of Le Mans career
- Years: 1952
- Teams: Aston Martin
- Best finish: DNF (1952)

Pat Griffith (26 April 1926 – 28 January 1980) was an English racing driver, who raced for the works Aston Martin team during the early 1950s, winning the 1953 RAC Tourist Trophy.

== Racing career ==
In 1951, Griffith was racing a Lester T51, which was an MG Special, when he first came to the fore. During the British Empire Trophy, he was lapping the Douglas circuit so swiftly, Stirling Moss commented that he believed that he wouldn’t have caught Griffith despite his car being in a higher class, when Griffith’s Lester engine seized. This race brought Griffith to the attention of David Brown, and he was signed by the works Aston Martin team for the 1952 season.

1952 saw Griffith make his only start at Le Mans, but fail to finish the race, likewise in the 1952 Mille Miglia. After those races in Europe, Griffith score two victories for the team. The first being a National event at the Welsh circuit, Fairwood. The second came when he shared the winning DB3 with Peter Collins in the Goodwood Nine-Hour race. He continued to race his Lester. In that season’s British Empire Trophy, he again set a cracking pace, but collided with a dog. Both the car and dog survived the incident, with Griffith going on to win.

In 1953 saw Griffith continue with the Aston Martin team, still as co-driver to Collins. The partnership finished second in the Goodwood Nine-Hour and won the RAC Tourist Trophy. He also drove the Monkey Stable’s Kieft-MG during the season when his job and Aston Martin commitments allowed, with other minor success. 1954 started well, when he and Collins drove the works Aston Martin DB3S to third place in the 1000 km Buenos Aires. Following retirements in the 12 Hours of Sebring and Mille Miglia, Griffith was planning to retire from the sport at the end of the season, when he suffered a major accident in the 12 Heures de Hyères. Whilst driving Graham Whitehead’s DB3S, he was forced off the road by another driver and was thrown out of the car. After missing that year's Le Mans, he returned to racing at the RAC Tourist Trophy, but afterwards admitted he had become apprehensive about going too fast", and left the sport for good.

== Racing record ==
=== Career highlights ===
Season	Series	Position	Team	Car
1952	British Empire Trophy	1st	The Monkey Stable	Lester-MG T51
	9 Hours of Goodwood	1st	David Brown	Aston Martin DB3
1953	RAC Tourist Trophy	1st	Aston Martin	Aston Martin DB3S
	9 Hours of Goodwood	2nd	David Brown	Aston Martin DB3S
1954	1000 km Buenos Aires	3rd	David Brown	Aston Martin DB3S

=== Complete 24 Hours of Le Mans results ===
Year	Team	Co-Drivers	Car	Class	Laps	Pos.	Class Pos.
1952	(United Kingdom) Aston Martin Ltd.	(United Kingdom) Dennis Poore	Aston Martin DB3	S3.0		DNF; Water pump	

=== Complete 12 Hours of Sebring results ===
Year	Team	Co-Drivers	Car	Class	Laps	Pos.	Class Pos.
1954	(United Kingdom) Aston Martin, Ltd.	(United Kingdom) Peter Collins	Aston Martin DB3S	S3.0	26	DNF; Brakes	

=== Complete Mille Miglia results ===
Year	Team	Co-Drivers	Car	Class	Pos.	Class Pos.
1952	(United Kingdom) Aston Martin Ltd.	(United Kingdom) George Abecassis	Aston Martin DB2	GT+2.0	DNF; Clutch	
1953	(United Kingdom) Aston Martin Lagonda	(United Kingdom) George Abecassis	Aston Martin DB3	S+2.0	DNF; Steering, accident	
1954	(United Kingdom) David Brown	(United Kingdom) Peter Collins	Aston Martin DB3S	S+2.0	DNF; Accident	

=== Complete 12 Hours of Hyères results ===
Year	Team	Co-Drivers	Car	Class	Pos.	Class Pos.
1954	(United Kingdom) Graham Whitehead	(United Kingdom) Graham Whitehead	Aston Martin DB3S		DNF; Accident	

Sporting positions
Preceded by Stirling Moss	British Empire Trophy winner 1952	Succeeded by Reg Parnell
