= 1954 Tourist Trophy =

The 1954 Tourist Trophy may refer to the following races:

- The 1954 Isle of Man TT, for Grand Prix Motorcycles
- The 1954 RAC Tourist Trophy, for sports cars held at Dundrod
- The 1954 Dutch TT, for Grand Prix Motorcycles held at Assen
