= 1951 24 Hours of Le Mans =

19th 24 Hours of Le Mans endurance race

Previous: 1950	Next: 1952
Index: Races | Winners

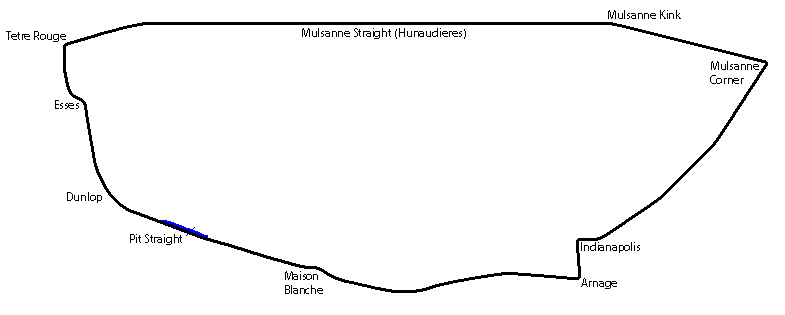
Le Mans in 1951

The 1951 24 Hours of Le Mans was the 19th Grand Prix of Endurance, and took place on 23 and 24 June 1951. It was won by Peter Walker and Peter Whitehead in their works-entered Jaguar C-type, the first Le Mans win for the marque.

The arrival of Jaguar's and Cunningham's first purpose-built racers in direct competition with Ferrari, and the first showing for Porsche and Lancia, marked the beginning of an era of intense competition between manufacturers of sports cars. The more powerful new sport racers would develop rapidly and put a final end to luxury touring cars and their derivatives as top contenders at Le Mans. It was the final outing for Delahaye and Bentley (for 50 years) and the sports prototype tide would overwhelm Talbot-Lago in the next couple of years. The race was marred by the death of French driver Jean Larivière within the opening laps of the race.

== Regulations ==
This year there were no significant changes to the regulations, by either the CSI or the Automobile Club de l'Ouest (ACO), except to create a Reserve list as a back-up to the basic sixty entrants.

== Entries ==
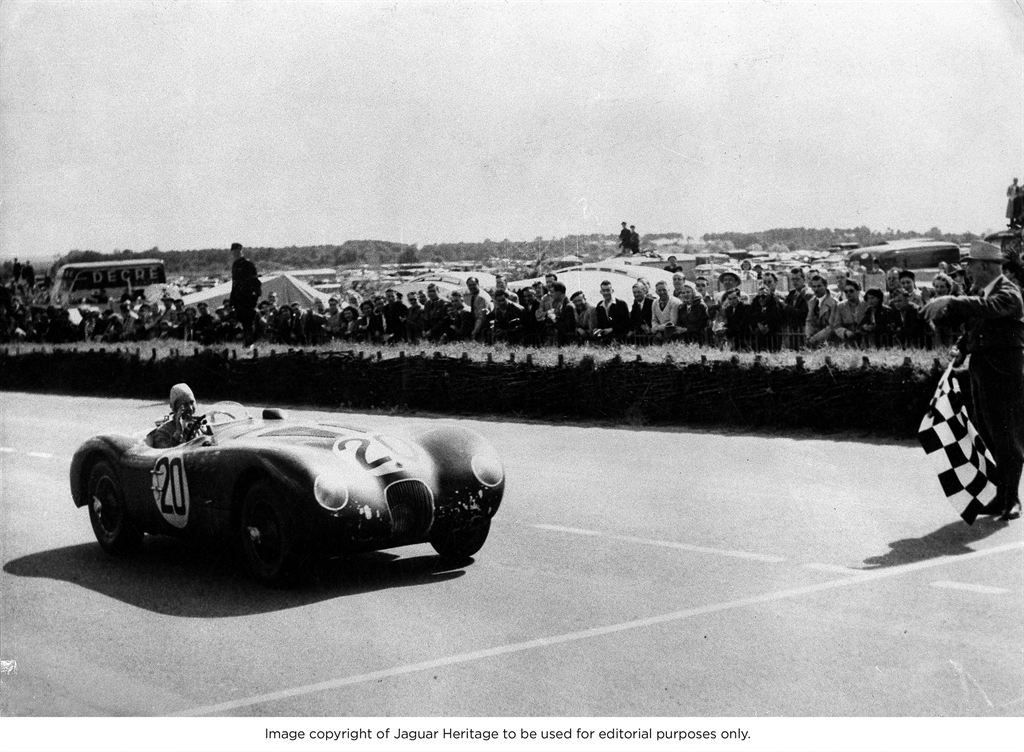
Peter Walker and Peter Whitehead won the race driving a Jaguar XK-120C

Works entries were entered by Aston Martin, Frazer-Nash, Healey, Jaguar, Jowett, Panhard and Renault as well as self-built cars from Allard, Cunningham, DB, Delettrez, Gordini and Monopole. The biggest sensation were the three works cars from Jaguar after their private entry the year before. Designed in complete secrecy specifically for Le Mans, the XK-120C, or C-Type (‘C’ standing for ‘Competition’) was 450 kg lighter than before and its 3.4L engine developed 205 bhp with a top speed of 160 mph (257 km/h). Along with Fairman, Whitehead and Johnson, team manager “Lofty” England paired them up respectively with debutants Stirling Moss and Peter Whitehead and multiple Mille Miglia winner Clemente Biondetti. Sydney Allard again had the biggest cars, returning with a pair of his J2s with their 5.4L Cadillac engines. John Wyer’s works Aston Martin team fielded three DB2 coupés, bolstered by a pair of privately-entered DB-2s. In the 3.0L class, their reliable 2.6L engines had improved to develop 138bhp.

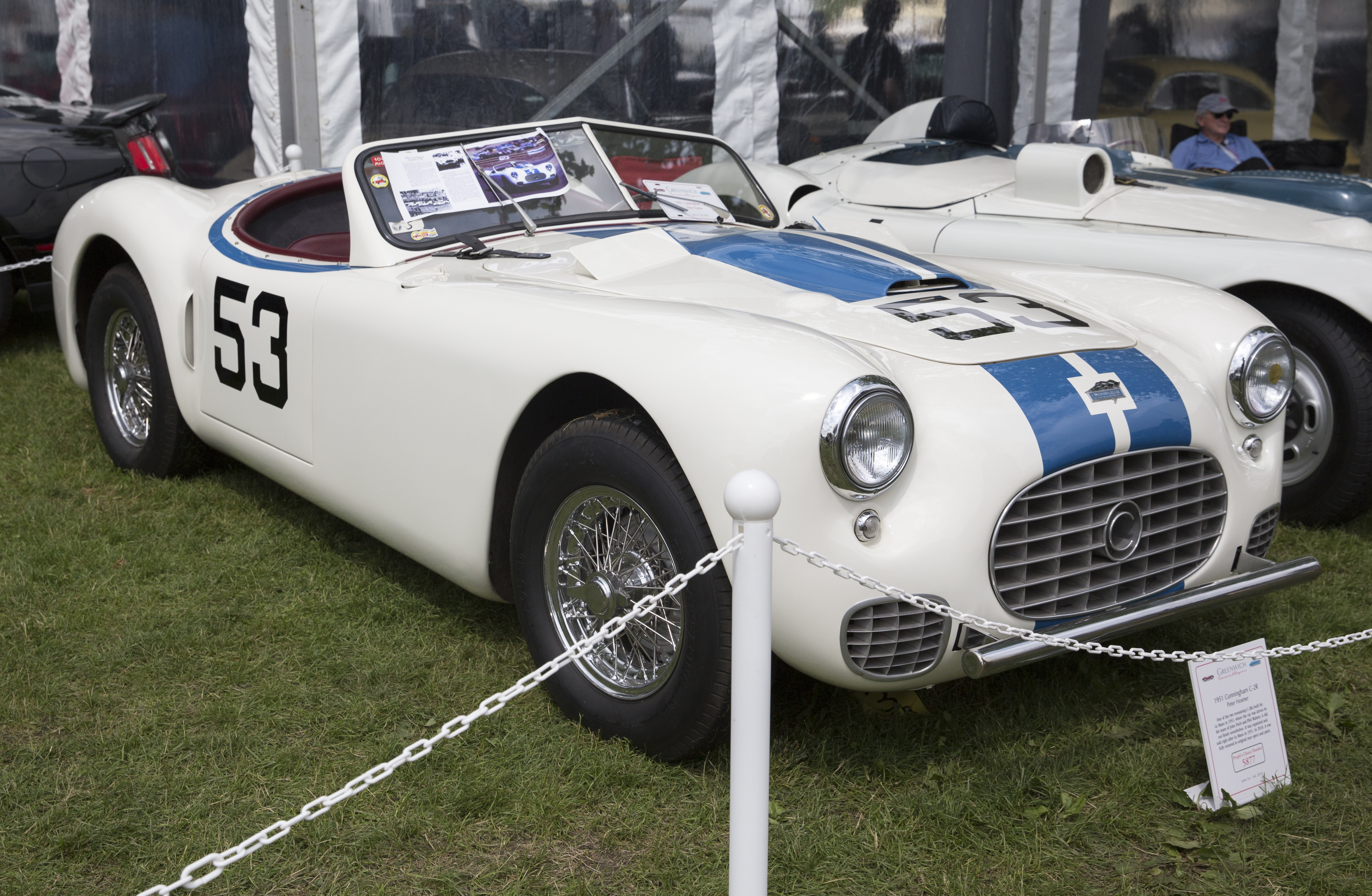
Cunningham C-2R driven by Wacker and Rand. It did not finish.

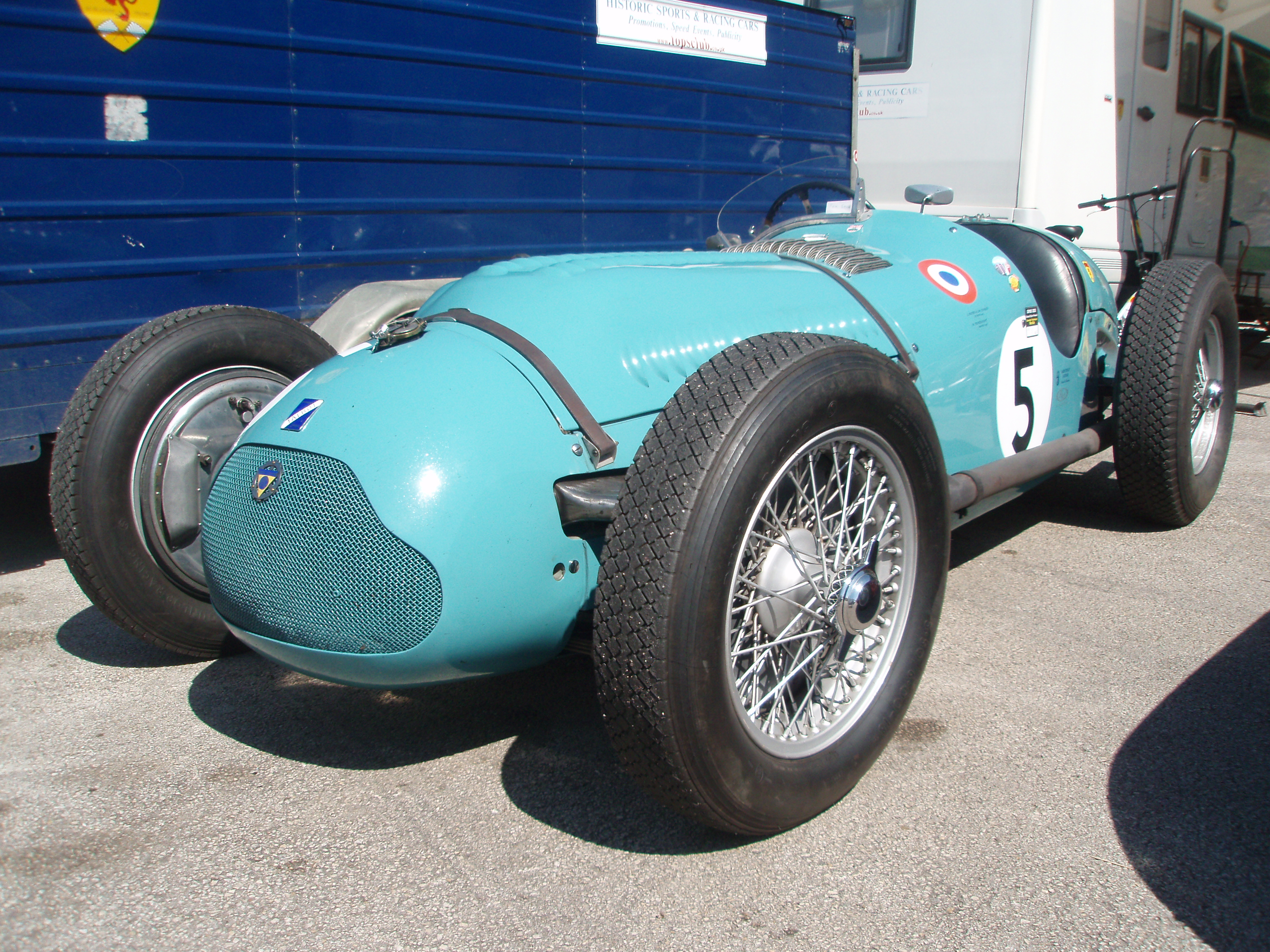
Talbot-Lago T26C driven by Rosier and Fangio. It did not finish. The car competed with cycle fenders in the race.

Briggs Cunningham also returned, this year with three cars of his own design – the first serious American entry for victory in 20 years. Although heavy, the C-2R with its big 5.4L Chrysler V8 engine, could develop a powerful 225bhp and had a top speed over 240 km/h. Defending French honour, after the previous year’s victory, were six private-entrant Talbots, including four of the two-seat Formula 1 conversions. With works backing, 'Tony' Lago hired the top Argentinian drivers from F1: Juan-Manuel Fangio drove with last year’s winner Louis Rosier, while José Froilán González was paired with the young Onofre Marimón. This year also marked the final entry by Delahaye.

The biggest entry from a single marque were nine Ferraris (including three entered by US Ferrari-agent & triple Le Mans winner Luigi Chinetti). Although there was still no works team, they did include four of the exciting new ‘340 America’ in the big-engine class. After winning the Mille Miglia, they arrived as one of the pre-race favourites: the 4.1L V12 engine (based on the F1 4.5L engine) matched the Cunninghams, producing 230 bhp and a top speed around 240 km/h. There were also three new ‘212 Export’ models with 2.4L engines and a pair of the older 2.0L, race-proven, ‘166MM’ models. The other Italian entry was a lone Lancia, here for the first time. Vittorio Jano’s Aurelia B20 design was a development of the B10, the first production car with a V6 engine. Entered by the Milanese Scuderia Ambrosiana team of Count Giovanni Lurani, it was the first car at Le Mans to race with radial tyres. Finally, both the Bentley sedan and Delettrez diesel returned for the last time.

In the smaller categories, there was a significant new entrant: Race director and founder Charles Faroux had approached Porsche to be the first German car in the post-war races. Five of its modern new 356 SL (Super Leicht) model were built but two were wrecked in road-testing, but two did make the entry-list. Its 1086cc engine developed just 46bhp but that still gave a top speed of 100mph (160 km/h). Again, French makes dominated the small classes, with 16 entries from Panhard, DB, Monopole, Renault, Simca, Gordini and several one-off specials (all with an assortment of Panhard, Simca or Renault engines) Up against them, aside from the Porsches, was a single Czech Aero-Minor, a pair of Jowetts, an MG and a new American Crosley.

== Practice ==
The Jaguars immediately showed their pace, although Peter Walker complained that the lights were insufficient in the night-practice. When it was pointed out he had his tinted glasses on, he took them off and went out and immediately did an unofficial lap of 4:46. But it was Phil Walters’ Cunningham that set the fastest official practice lap at 5:03. The later practice sessions were compromised by very wet weather. Rudolf Sauerwein suffered severe leg injuries when his new Porsche crashed and rolled, almost collecting Moss's Jaguar and Morris-Goodall's Aston Martin following close behind. A number of cars had engine problems in practice that were traced to the fuel supplied by the ACO – nominally 80-octane, but that was suspect. Many teams needed to do last minute engine modifications.

== Race ==
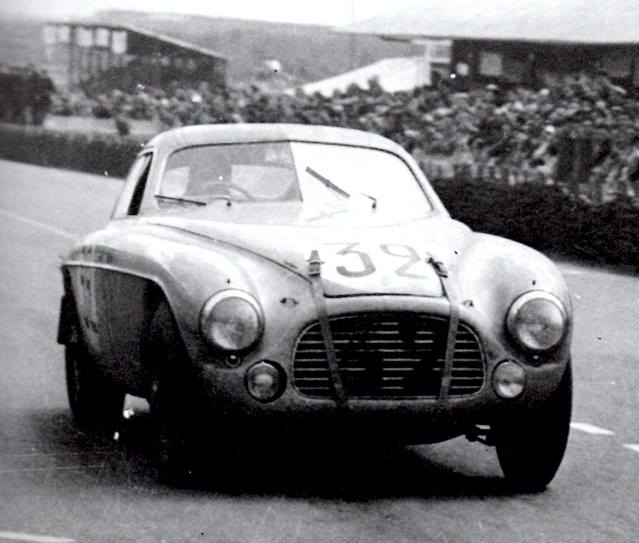
Ferrari 166 MM of Simon/Haig during the race, in which they finished 15th overall

=== Start ===
After all the rain in practice, race-day also started wet but it was dry for the start. Tom Cole's Allard was first away, but at the end of the first lap, it was the Talbot of González ahead of Moss and Cole. After three laps, the young Stirling Moss dashed into the lead. Tragedy struck on the sixth lap, when French driver Jean Larivière crashed his Ferrari 212 heavily into a sandbank at Tertre Rouge, getting airborne. He was killed instantly when virtually decapitated by a wire fence. (Note: This occurred a half-hour into the race on Larivière‘s 5th lap, but the leaders had started their 6th)

The race continued though, and Moss set a blistering pace, repeatedly lowering Rosier's 1950 lap record (eventually, over 6 seconds quicker). After an hour, Moss led González, ahead of the Jaguars of Biondetti and Walker, then the Talbots of Chaboud and Rosier. By the end of the second hour, Moss had put a lap on the whole field. At the four-hour mark Moss & Fairman had a lead of over 2 laps, with the Jaguar team running 1-2-3, ahead of the Talbots of González and Fangio.

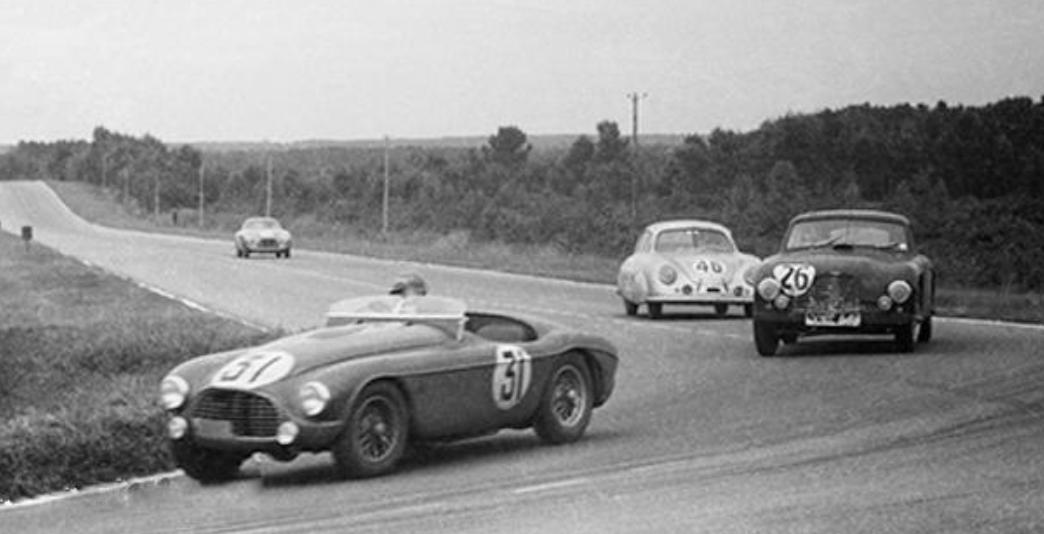
Moran in Ferrari 212 (#31), Macklin in Aston Martin DB2 (#26) and a Porsche 356 (#46) driven by Veuillet and Mouche.

Soon afterward, the rain returned and stayed for the rest of the night. The pace was starting to take its toll: Both Allards had gone off track, and repairing the damage put them well down. Chaboud's Talbot was out with radiator problems, and a loss of oil pressure caused a similar problem stopping the Biondetti Jaguar. Louis Chiron, running in the top 10, ran his Ferrari out of gas on-track, but when the officials found out a mechanic had driven out to him with a tank of fuel to top up he was disqualified.

In the smaller classes, the 1500cc Gordinis were comfortably ahead of their English competition (the Jowetts and MG) – at times 40 seconds a lap faster - Manzon and Trintignant running as high as 15th and 16th respectively, mixing it with the bigger cars until both were put out with engine problems after only 4 hours.

=== Night ===
Just before midnight, after his car had held the lead for more than 7 hours, Moss’ impressive run came to an end – a conrod broke due, like Biondetti, due to a major loss of oil pressure. Soon after, Rosier was stopped by a split oil tank. The remaining works Jaguar of Walker/Whitehead inherited the lead, a lap ahead of González/Marimón. The Britons extended the lead to 7 laps, easily matching the Talbot's pace through the night until the latter car retired with a blown head gasket at the halfway mark.

The Ferrari challenge never really materialised, although wealthy Englishman Eddie Hall, who had driven solo the previous year to 2nd place, had his Ferrari 340 up to as high as 3rd during the night. The big heavy Cunninghams suffered in the greasy wet conditions; two had been held up in the first couple of hours and were well down the order. Huntoon, co-driving the boss’ car, slid off at Indianapolis wrecking the steering, then soon afterward Rand spun his car in traffic at the Dunlop curve. He missed the other cars but slammed into the roadside bank. The third car though, of Fitch/Walters, had been in the top 10 throughout, steadily picking up places as others fell out, and was up to 2nd when the Talbot retired. The Allard/Cole car had charged through the field up to 4th after its initial delay, but was finally stopped at the end of the night by a broken gearbox.

Back in the junior classes, with only the reserve-entry Jowett left, the Gordinis were making good progress, with a 9-lap lead, when disaster struck – both remaining Gordinis were retired late in the night with yet more engine problems.

=== Morning ===
As dawn broke, the Jaguar had a comfortable 8-lap lead over the Cunningham, the Macklin/Thompson Aston Martin and the Rolt/Hamilton Nash-Healey. Hall's Ferrari gave up with a flat battery and would not restart. The two Talbots of Mairesse/Meyrat and Bouillin/Marchand followed, trying to stage a fightback, split by the Abecassis/Shawe-Taylor Aston Martin. This order stayed fairly constant through the morning, until midday when the Cunningham hit the pits with engine problems. The crew made repairs and it crawled around doing occasional slow laps, waiting for the race-end. By pushing hard, Mairesse and Meyrat picked off the Nash-Healey in the early morning, then passed the Aston Martin into 3rd about 11am, which became 2nd when the Cunningham stopped.

Meanwhile, even being the sole survivor of the S1500 class, it still took the Jowett over an hour to overtake the leading Gordini on distance – they eventually cruised home to finish 21st.

=== Finish and post-race ===
In the end, the Jaguar won at a canter, with a 9-lap lead over the Talbot. Despite 16 hours of rain, the Jaguar easily broke the distance record, covering over 3600 km. Even though Mairesse put in his fastest lap in the last hour, and they covered two more laps than Rosier's winning Talbot last year, Meyrat and Mairesse were not going to catch the Jaguar and they again finished second. Debutants Pierre Bouillin (racing under the pseudonym Levegh) and René Marchand, driving Mairesse's 1949-race Talbot finished a creditable 4th. The Aston Martins again proved extremely reliable: five entered, five finished with the three works cars coming in 3rd, 5th and 7th and 1-2-3 in class. Macklin & Thompson in 3rd were less than a lap behind the Talbot, having spent only 10 minutes in the pits during the whole race. Like the previous year, the Anglo-American Nash-Healey of Rolt/Hamilton had proven very reliable. Even with its bigger engine, its heavier weight meant it could never compete with the Jaguars and Talbots in its class for pace, but that reliability had got it up to 4th in the morning, until overtaken by the Talbot and the leading Aston Martin and finishing 6th. Only one of the big Ferraris finished – Chinetti's own, in 8th, although three of the smaller ones did make it to the end. The Lancia had run like clockwork finishing 12th. Incredibly it had covered nearly 2000 miles on just a single set of tyres, and was then driven back to Turin after the race.

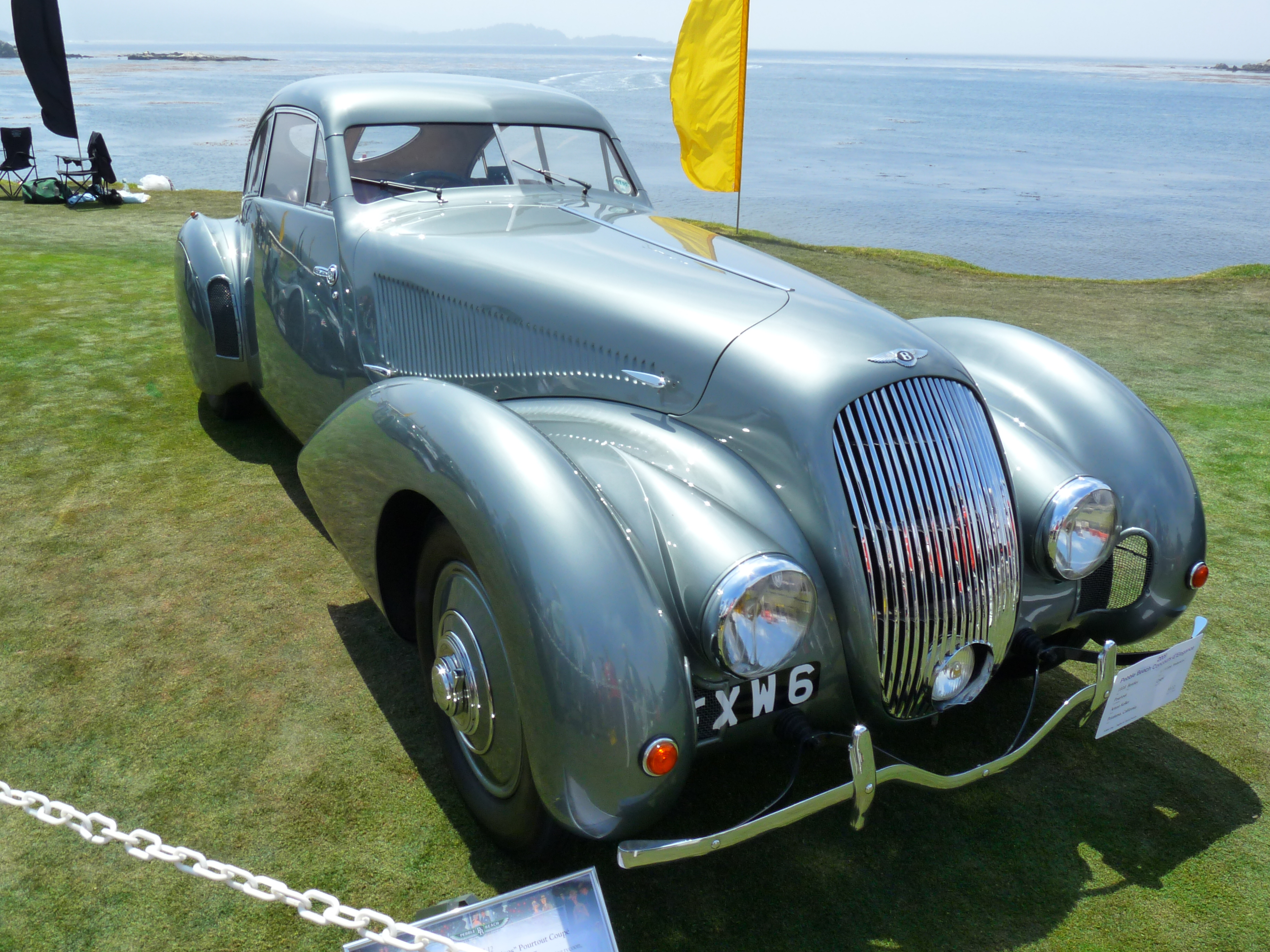
Bentley 4 1/4 litre driven by Hay and Clarke. It did not cover the required distance.

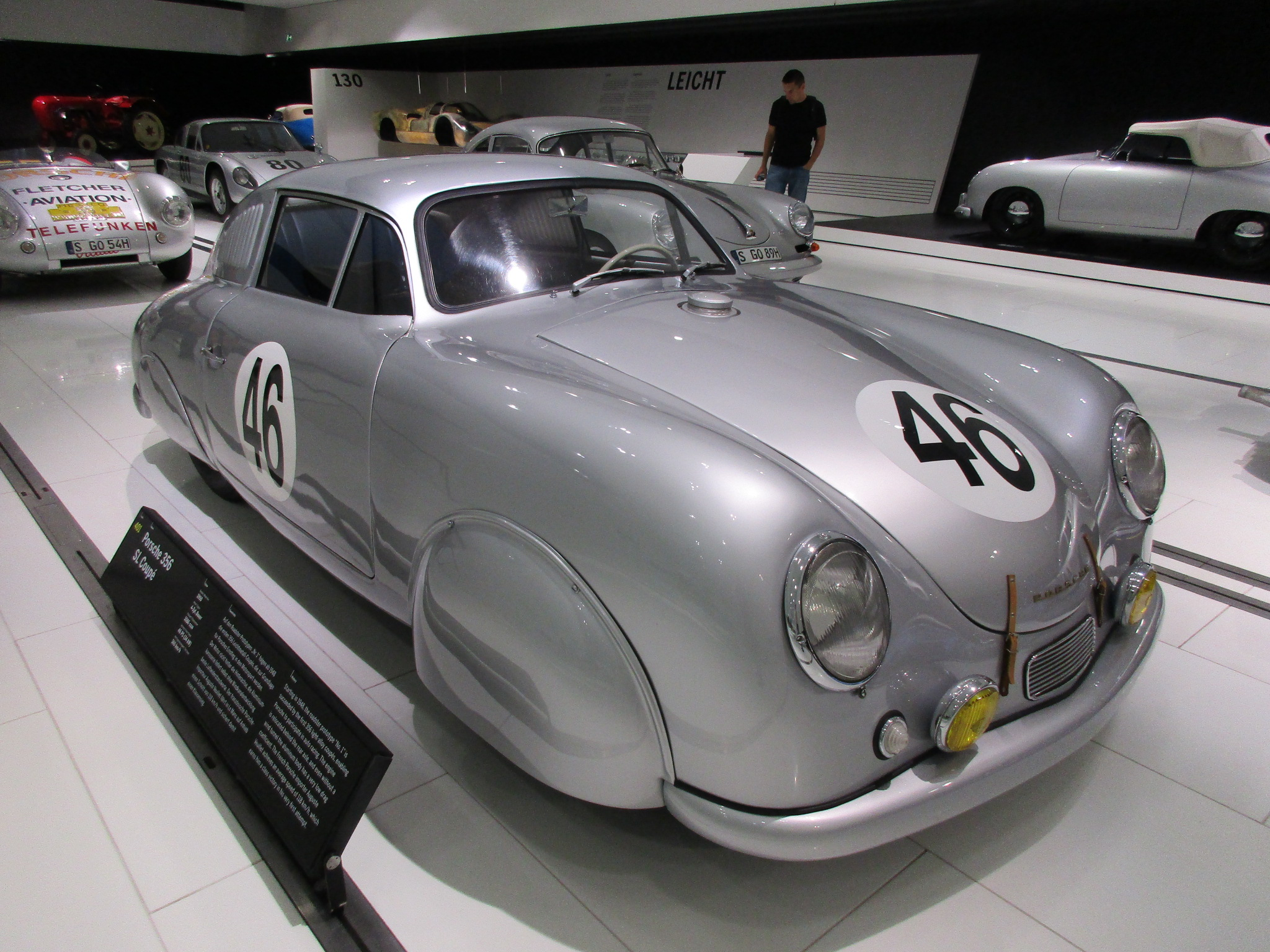
Porsche 356 SL driven by Veuillet and Mouche, which won the S 1.1 class

The Porsche of Auguste Veuillet (the Porsche agent in Paris) won its class at first attempt. For the second year running, the Biennial Cup and the Index of Performance both went to the works Monopole by Pierre Hérnard & Jean de Montrémy The Cunningham driven by John Fitch, the second Allard entry, and the Bentley were not classified – the former two could not get their final laps done in the minimum time and the latter missed its minimum required distance by 4 miles (half a lap).

The popular American adage of the time – “Win on Sunday, sell on Monday” – was particularly apt for Jaguar. It was later estimated that extra sales of US$12 million were generated in the USA alone from their Le Mans win. By contrast, the negative press for Gordini's failure led to Simca withdrawing its engine supply to the team.

== Official results ==
Pos	Class	No	Team	Drivers	Chassis	Engine	Laps
1	S 5.0	20	(United Kingdom) Jaguar Cars Ltd	(United Kingdom) Peter Walker (United Kingdom) Peter Whitehead	Jaguar XK-120C	Jaguar 3.4L S6	267
2	S 5.0	9	(France) Pierre Meyrat (private entrant)	(France) Pierre Meyrat (France) Guy Mairesse	Talbot-Lago T26 GS Biplace	Talbot-Lago 4.5L S6	258
3	S 3.0	26	(United Kingdom) Aston Martin Ltd.	(United Kingdom) Lance Macklin (United Kingdom) Eric Thompson	Aston Martin DB2	Aston Martin 2.6L S6	257
4	S 5.0	10	(France) Pierre ”Levegh” (private entrant)	(France) Pierre "Levegh" (France) René Marchand	Talbot-Lago T26 Monoplace Décalée	Talbot-Lago 4.5L S6	256
5	S 3.0	25	(United Kingdom) Aston Martin Ltd.	(United Kingdom) George Abecassis (United Kingdom) Brian Shawe-Taylor	Aston Martin DB2	Aston Martin 2.6L S6	255
6	S 5.0	19	(United Kingdom) Donald Healey Motor Company	(United Kingdom) Tony Rolt (United Kingdom) Duncan Hamilton	Nash-Healey Sport Coupé	Nash 3.8L S6	255
7	S 3.0	24	(United Kingdom) Aston Martin Ltd.	(United Kingdom) Reg Parnell (United Kingdom) David Hampshire	Aston Martin DB2	Aston Martin 2.6L S6	252
8	S 5.0	15	(United States) Luigi Chinetti	(United States) Luigi Chinetti (France) Jean Lucas	Ferrari 340 America Barchetta	Ferrari 4.1L V12	246
9	S 3.0	29	(France) N.-J. Mahé (private entrant)	(France) Norbert Jean Mahé (France) Jacques Péron	Ferrari 212 Export Coupé	Ferrari 2.6L V12	244
10	S 3.0	28	(United Kingdom) N.H. Mann (private entrant)	(United Kingdom) Nigel Mann (United Kingdom) Mortimer Morris-Goodall	Aston Martin DB2	Aston Martin 2.6L S6	236
11	S 5.0	21	(United Kingdom) R. Lawrie (private entrant)	(United Kingdom) Rob Lawrie (United Kingdom) Ivan Waller	Jaguar XK-120S	Jaguar 3.4L S6	236
12	S 2.0	33	(Italy) Scuderia Ambrosiana	(Italy) Comte Giovanni Lurani (Italy) Giovanni Bracco	Lancia Aurelia B20 GT	Lancia 2.0L V6	235
13	S 3.0	27	(United Kingdom) P.T.C. Clark (private entrant)	(United Kingdom) Peter Clark (United Kingdom) James Scott-Douglas	Aston Martin DB2	Aston Martin 2.6L S6	233
14	S 2.0	35	(United Kingdom) Automobiles Frazer Nash Ltd.	(United Kingdom) Eric Winterbottom (United Kingdom) John Marshall	Frazer Nash Le Mans Replica	Bristol 2.0L S6	232
15	S 2.0	32	(United States) Luigi Chinetti	(France) Yvonne Simon (United Kingdom) Betty Haig	Ferrari 166 MM Berlinetta	Ferrari 2.0L V12	231
16	S 3.0	31	(United States) Charles Moran Jr. (private entrant)	(United States) Charles Moran Jr. (Italy) Franco Cornacchia	Ferrari 212 Export Spyder	Ferrari 2.6L V12	227
17	S 5.0	11	(France) A. Chambas (private entrant)	(France) André Chambas (France) André Morel	Talbot-Lago SS Spyder	Talbot-Lago 4.5L S6	226
18	S 2.0	34	(United Kingdom) Mrs P. Trevelyan (private entrant)	(United Kingdom) Richard "Dickie" Stoop (United Kingdom) Peter Wilson	Frazer Nash Mille Miglia	Bristol 2.0L S6	217
19	S 1.1	46	(Germany) Porsche K.G.	(France) Auguste Veuillet (France) Edmond Mouche	Porsche 356 SL Coupe	Porsche 1086cc Flat-4	210
20	S 1.1	48	(France) Automobiles Deutsch et Bonnet	(France) René Bonnet (France) Élie Bayol	DB Sport	Panhard 851cc Flat-2	206
21	S 1.5	66	(France) M. Becquart (private entrant)	(France) Marcel Becquart (United Kingdom) Gordon Wilkins	Jowett Jupiter	Jowett 1486cc Flat-4	203
22	S 750	50	(France) Régie Renault	(France) Francois Landon (France) André Briat	Renault 4CV-1063	Renault 747cc S4	197
23	S 750	60	(France) Établissements Monopole	(France) Jean de Montrémy (France) Jean Hémard	Monopole X84	Panhard 614cc FLat-2	194
24	S 750	61	(France) R. Gaillard (private entrant)	(France) Raymond Gaillard (France) Pierre Chancel	Panhard Dyna X84	Panhard 611cc Flat-2	190
25	S 750	54	(France) Régie Renault	(France) Jacques Lecat (France) Henri Senftleben	Renault 4CV-1063	Renault 747cc S4	184
26	S 750	58	(France) Auguste Lachaize (private entrant)	(France) Jean-Paul Colas (France) Robert Schollmann	Callista RAN D120	Panhard 611cc Flat-2	183
27	S 750	53	(France) Régie Renault	(France) Just-Emile Vernet (France) Jean Pairard	Renault 4CV-1063	Renault 747cc S4	181
28	S 750	56	(France) Automobiles Deutsch et Bonnet	(France) Michel Arnaud (France) Louis Pons	DB Sport	Panhard 745cc Flat-2	179

== Did not finish ==
Pos	Class	No	Team	Drivers	Chassis	Engine	Laps	Reason
29	S 8.0	2	(United Kingdom) S.H. Allard	(United Kingdom) Peter Reece (United Kingdom) Alfred Hitchings	Allard J2	Cadillac 5.4L V8	230	not classified last lap too slow
30	S 8.0	4	(United States) Briggs Cunningham	(United States) John Fitch (United States) Phil Walters	Cunningham C-2R	Chrysler 5.5L V8	223	not classified last lap too slow
31	S 5.0	14	(United Kingdom) H.S.F. Hay (private entrant)	(United Kingdom) Jack ‘Zoltan’ Hay (United Kingdom) Tom Clarke	Bentley 4¼ Paulin	Bentley 4.3L S6	204	not classified insufficient distance
32	S 750	51	(France) Régie Renault	(France) Jean-Louis Rosier (France) Jean Estager	Renault 4CV-1063	Renault 0.7L I4	194	accident (24h)
33	S 750	57	(Belgium) L. Eggen (private entrant)	(Belgium) Louis Eggen (France) André Beaulieux	DB Sport	Panhard 745cc Flat-2	184	Disqualified (23h) outside assistance
34	S 750	52	(France) Régie Renault	(France) Jean Sandt (France) Paul Moser	Renault 4CV-1063	Renault 747cc S4	177	fire (21h)
35	S 8.0	1	(United Kingdom) S.H. Allard	(United Kingdom) Sydney Allard (United States) Tom Cole Jr.	Allard J2	Cadillac 5.4L V8	134	gearbox (13h)
36	S 1.1	45	(Switzerland) R. Caron (private entrant)	(Switzerland) Roger Caron (France) André Guillard	Simca Huit Sport	Simca 1090cc S4	133	engine (19h)
37	S 5.0	17	(United States) William Spear (private entrant)	(United States) William "Bill" Spear (Belgium) Johnny Claes	Ferrari 340 America Barchetta	Ferrari 4.1L V12	132	clutch (17h)
38	S 1.5	37	(France) Equipe Gordini	(France) Pierre Veyron (France) Georges Monneret	Gordini T15S	Simca 1495cc S4	130	engine (13h)
39	S 5.0	7	(France) Henri Louveau (private entrant)	(Argentina) José Froilán González (Argentina) Onofre Marimón	Talbot-Lago T26 GS Biplace	Talbot-Lago 4.5L S6	128	radiator (13h)
40	S 5.0	18	(United Kingdom) E.R. Hall (private entrant)	(United Kingdom) Eddie Hall (Italy) Giuseppe Navone	Ferrari 340 America Barchetta	Ferrari 4.1L V12	125	battery (13h)
41	S 8.0	5	(United States) Briggs Cunningham	(United States) George Rand (United States) Fred Wacker, Jr.	Cunningham C-2R	Chrysler 5.5L V8	98	accident (11h)
42	S 5.0	6	(France) Louis Rosier (private entrant)	(France) Louis Rosier (Argentina) Juan Manuel Fangio	Talbot-Lago T26 GS Biplace	Talbot-Lago 4.5L S6	92	oil tank (9h)
43	S 5.0	22	(United Kingdom) Jaguar Cars Ltd (United Kingdom) Stirling Moss	(United Kingdom) Stirling Moss (United Kingdom) Jack Fairman	Jaguar XK-120C	Jaguar 3.4L S6	92	engine (9h)
44	S 5.0	62	(France) H. Leblanc (private entrant)	(France) Henry Leblanc (France) Robert Bertrand	Delahaye 135CS	Delahaye 3.6L S6	88	brakes (11h)
45	S 1.5	43	(United Kingdom) G.E. Phillips (private entrant)	(United Kingdom) George Phillips (United Kingdom) Alan Rippon	MG TD EX.172	MG 1250cc S4	80	engine (9h)
46	S 1.5	40	(France) Equipe Gordini	(France) José Scaron (France) Aldo Gordini	Gordini T15S	Simca 1495cc S4	77	fuel pump (13h)
47	S 8.0	3	(United States) Briggs Cunningham	(United States) Briggs Cunningham (United States) George Huntoon	Cunningham C-2R	Chrysler 5.5L V8	76	accident (9h)
48	S 2.0	64	(France) René Bouchard (private entrant)	(France) Robert Bouchard (France) Lucien Farnaud	Ferrari 166 MM Barchetta	Ferrari 2.0L V12	75	engine (13h)
49	S 5.0	23	(United Kingdom) Jaguar Cars Ltd (Italy) Clemente Biondetti	(Italy) Clemente Biondetti (United Kingdom) Leslie Johnson	Jaguar XK-120C	Jaguar 3.4L S6	50	oil pump (5h)
50	S 1.5	39	(France) Equipe Gordini	(France) Maurice Trintignant (France) Jean Behra	Gordini T15S	Simca 1495cc S4	49	ignition (5h)
51	S 1.5	41	(United Kingdom) Jowett Cars Ltd.	(United Kingdom) Tommy Wisdom (United Kingdom) Tommy Wise	Jowett Jupiter R1	Jowett 1486cc Flat-4	48	engine (5h)
52	S 750	59	(United States) Crosley Motors	(United States) George Schrafft (United States) Phil Stiles	Crosley Hotshot Super Sport	Crosley 726cc S4	40	alternator (5h)
53	S 750	49	(France) J. Poch (private entrant)	(France) Jacques Poch (France) Maurice Vaselle	Aero Minor	Aero 749cc S2 (2-Stroke)	40	ignition (9h)
54	S 750	55	(France) Satecmo	(France) Georges Claude (France) Pierre Clause	Renault 4CV-1063	Renault 747cc S4	38	ignition (9h)
55	S 5.0	8	(France) E. Chaboud (private entrant)	(France) Eugène Chaboud (France) Lucien Vincent	Talbot-Lago T26 GS Biplace	Talbot-Lago 4.5L S6	33	radiator (4h)
56	S 5.0	16	(United States) Luigi Chinetti	(Monaco) Louis Chiron (France) Pierre-Louis Dreyfus ("Heldé")	Ferrari 340 America Barchetta	Ferrari 4.1L V12	29	Disqualified (3h) premature refuelling
57	S 1.5	38	(France) Equipe Gordini	(France) Robert Manzon (France) André Simon	Gordini T15S	Simca 1495cc S4	26	engine (5h)
58	S 5.0	12	(France) Etablissements Delettrez	(France) Jean Delettrez (France) Jacques Delettrez	Delettrez Diesel	Delettrez 4.5L S6 (Diesel)	24	ignition (5h)
59	S 1.5	42	(United Kingdom) Jowett Cars Ltd.	(United Kingdom) Bert Hadley (United Kingdom) Charles Goodacre	Jowett Jupiter	Jowett 1486cc Flat-4	19	electrics (3h)
60	S 3.0	30	(Belgium) Johnny Claes (private entrant)	(France) Jean Larivière (France) André Guelfi	Ferrari 212 Export C	Ferrari 2.6L V12	5	fatal accident (1h)

== Did not start ==
Pos	Class	No	Team	Drivers	Chassis	Engine	Reason
61	S 1.1	47	(Germany) Porsche K.G.	(Germany) Rudolf Sauerwein (France) Robert Brunet	Porsche 356 SL Coupe	Porsche 1086cc Flat-4	Accident in practice

== 17th Rudge-Whitworth Biennial Cup (1950/1951) ==
Pos	Class	No	Team	Drivers	Chassis	Score
1	S 750	60	(France) Établissements Monopole	(France) Jean de Montrémy (France) Jean Hémard	Monopole X84	1.376
2	S 750	61	(France) R. Gaillard (private entrant)	(France) Raymond Gaillard (France) Pierre Chancel	Panhard Dyna X84	1.351
3	S 5.0	20	(United Kingdom) Jaguar Cars Ltd	(United Kingdom) Peter Walker (United Kingdom) Peter Whitehead	Jaguar XK-120C	1.326
4	S 1.1	48	(France) Automobiles Deutsch et Bonnet	(France) René Bonnet (France) Élie Bayol	DB Sport	1.308
5	S 3.0	25	(United Kingdom) Aston Martin Ltd.	(United Kingdom) George Abecassis (United Kingdom) Brian Shawe-Taylor	Aston Martin DB2	1.306
6	S 750	58	(France) Auguste Lachaize (private entrant)	(France) Jean-Paul Colas (France) Robert Schollmann	Callista RAN D120	1.297
7	S 3.0	24	(United Kingdom) Aston Martin Ltd.	(United Kingdom) Reg Parnell (United Kingdom) David Hampshire	Aston Martin DB2	1.288
8	S 5.0	19	(United Kingdom) Donald Healey Motor Company	(United Kingdom) Tony Rolt (United Kingdom) Duncan Hamilton	Nash-Healey Sport Coupé	1.254

== Statistics ==
- Fastest Lap in practice – Phil Walters, #2 Cunningham C-2R - 5:03.0; 160.30 kp/h (99.60 mph)
- Fastest Lap – Stirling Moss, #22 Jaguar XK120-C - 4m46.8s; 169.36 kp/h (105.24 mph)
- Distance – 3611.193 km (2244.0 miles)
- Winner's Average Speed – 150.466 km/h (93.50 mph)
- Attendance – about 100 000

== Trophy Winners ==
- 17th Rudge-Whitworth Biennial Cup – #60 Pierre Hérnard / Jean de Montrémy
- Index of Performance – #60 Pierre Hérnard / Jean de Montrémy
- Coupe des Dames – Mme Yvonne Simon / Miss Betty Haig, #32 Ferrari 166MM
