= Alfred Percy Hitchings =

Alfred Percy Hitchings (13 June 1912 – 1979) was an English racing driver, active during the 1950s. Born in Stoke-on-Trent, he became managing director of the family printing business, based in Hanley, but then served as an officer in the British Army from 1943 to at least 1952. He took part in the famous Le Mans 24 Hours race in 1951 and 1954. On the former occasion, his co-driver Peter Reece crashed their Allard J2 on lap 22, and although the pair were nevertheless able to complete a total of 230 laps they were disqualified because their final lap exceeded the prescribed thirty minute limit. In the 1954 race, the Kieft Sport of Hitchings and his co-driver Georges Trouis completed 26 laps over seven hours before overheating forced its retirement. Between these outings, Hitchings and Trouis met with better fortune in the 1953 RAC Tourist Trophy at the Dundrod Circuit in Northern Ireland, where their DB HBR Panhard took first place in its class. Off the track, Hitchings raced his own Porsche in rallies until at least 1956.

After retiring from racing, Hitchings moved first to Southern Rhodesia, and later to Tangier, Morocco, where he died in 1979.
