= George Abecassis =

British racing driver (1913–1991)

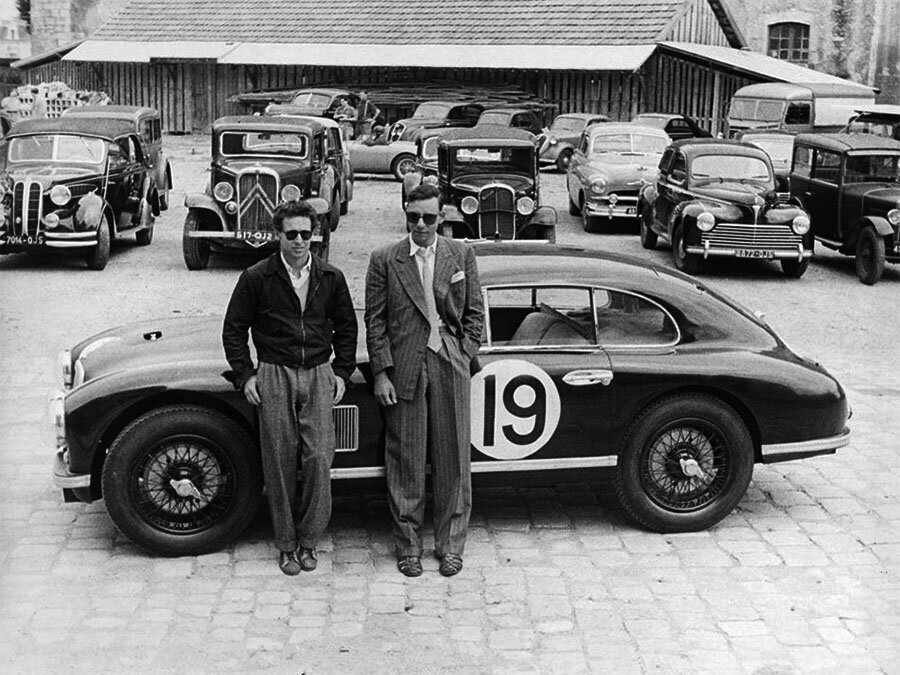
- Abecassis on left, with Lance Macklin and Aston Martin DB2 LML/50/8 at the 1950 24 Hours of Le Mans
- Born: George Edgar Abecassis; 21 March 1913 Oatlands, Surrey, England
- Died: 18 December 1991 (aged 78) Ibstone, Buckinghamshire, England
George Abecassis
Formula One World Championship career
- Nationality: (United Kingdom) British
- Active years: 1951 – 1952
- Team: HWM
- Entries: 2
- Championships: 0
- Wins: 0
- Podiums: 0
- Career points: 0
- Pole positions: 0
- Fastest laps: 0
- First entry: 1951 Swiss Grand Prix
- Last entry: 1952 Swiss Grand Prix
24 Hours of Le Mans career
- Years: 1950–1951, 1953
- Teams: Aston Martin
- Best finish: 5th (1950; 1951)
- Class wins: 1 (1950)
- Military career
- Allegiance: United Kingdom
- Branch: Royal Air Force (Volunteer Reserve)
- Service years: c. 1940–1953
- Rank: Squadron leader
- Service number: 115865
- Unit: No. 161 Squadron RAF
- Conflicts: World War II
- Awards: Distinguished Flying Cross; Mentioned in dispatches
- Website: Profile at Traces of War

George Edgar Abecassis DFC (21 March 1913 – 18 December 1991) was a British racing driver, and co-founder of the HWM Formula One team.

== Pre-1946 career ==
Born in Oatlands, Surrey, Abecassis was educated at Clifton College. He began circuit racing in 1935 in a modified Austin Seven which became known as The Einsitzer. After taking 1937 as a year away from the track, he acquired an Alta and made a name for himself in English national racing during the 1938 and 1939 seasons. In 1939, he won the Imperial Trophy Formula Libre race at Crystal Palace, driving his Alta, defeating Prince Bira, in the E.R.A. known as Romulus, in a wet race, "that being the only time it was beaten by a 1,500 cc (92 cu in) car in the British Isles."

At one point, Abecassis held the Campbell circuit lap record at Brooklands at 72.61 miles per hour (116.85 km/h) On 3 July 1938 Abecassis broke the Prescott Hill Climb record with a climb of 47.85 seconds in his supercharged 1½-litre Alta.

When World War II broke out, Abecassis joined the Royal Air Force, as a member of the Volunteer Reserves, and became an experienced pilot, ultimately becoming a member of the secret "Moon Squadrons", ferrying secret agents in and out of occupied countries in Europe with specially-modified Halifax and Stirling aircraft. During the course of his wartime service, Abecassis was awarded the Distinguished Flying Cross and was mentioned in dispatches with the following citation:

[Abecassis]... has been employed as a Flying Instructor and latterly as Deputy Flight Commander. His keenness and enthusiasm, combined with conscientious and consistent instruction, have always been an inspiration to trainee pilots and his pupils have in every case displayed the hallmark of his careful attention. He has carried out a long spell on the arduous and exacting duties of a Flying Instructor at an Operational Training Unit.

— as per London Gazette, 11 January 1944.

Abecassis achieved the rank of squadron leader, and, following the war, continued as a member of the RAF Volunteer Reserves prior to his discharge in 1953.

== Post-1946 career ==
After World War II, Abecassis went back to racing, initially with pre-war machinery. He won a race at Gransden Lodge in a road-going 3.3-litre Bugatti on 15 June 1946. In 1947, Abecassis finished second in the Swedish Grand Prix, held on a frozen lake at Vallentuna, driving an E.R.A. In 1948, he finished second to Bob Gerard in the Jersey International Road Race. He became a partner, with John Heath, in Hersham and Walton Motors Ltd., a motor dealership and garage in Walton-on-Thames. Building on his pre-war association with the Alta marque, Abecassis and HWM assisted in the development of the Alta GP car, designed to comply with the recently introduced Formula One regulations.

After the failure of this enterprise, Abecassis and Heath decided to construct their own cars under the HWM banner, but retaining Alta engines. Initially the HWM cars were designed to compete in the Formula Two class, but when the World Championship switched to Formula Two regulations in 1952 HWM cars became eligible to compete in the Grand Prix events. During their prime, HWM employed such future stars as Stirling Moss and Peter Collins, and the Belgian Johnny Claes scored their first victory, in the Grand Prix des Frontières at a street circuit in Chimay, Belgium. Abecassis's HWM team also took a notable victory in the International Trophy race at Silverstone in 1952, this time with Lance Macklin at the wheel. With the reintroduction of Formula One cars to the World Championship in 1954, Abecassis and Heath attempted to produce a competitive car using the 2.5-litre version of the Alta engine but it was not a success; HWM cars only contested two further Grand Prix events after 1953.

It was with his own HWM cars that Abecassis raced in his only two Formula One World Championship Grands Prix, at the Bremgarten circuit, in the 1951 and 1952 Swiss Grand Prix. He was more successful as a sports car driver with Aston Martin and won his class at the 24 Hours of Le Mans in 1950, sharing his DB2 with Macklin. He also finished second in the 12 Hours of Sebring in 1953, partnered by Reg Parnell. In 1953, Abecassis constructed an HWM sports car for his own personal use, powered by a Jaguar straight-6 engine, with which he successfully contested many national British races until 1956.

In 1955 Mille Miglia, Abecassis drove a red Austin Healey 100S (AHS3804) very fast in the last "Rome section" to an outstanding position close to the speeds of Stirling Moss with the Mercedes SLR and finished 11th overall.

In 1956, Heath was killed in an accident in the Mille Miglia and Abecassis retired from racing, turning his attention to running the HWM operations. He was the Facel Vega importer for Britain, while his motor industry connections were aided by the fact that he was married to Angela, the daughter of Aston Martin chairman Sir David Brown. He died aged 78, in Ibstone, near High Wycombe, Buckinghamshire.

In September 2010, his son David Abecassis published a comprehensive biography of his father under the title A Passion for Speed.

His grandson, Jonathan Abecassis, has an active interest in vintage sports car racing. He competes in the Fifties Sports Car Racing Club ("FISCAR") series, driving an Austin Healey 100/4.

== Racing record ==
=== Career highlights ===
Season	Series	Pos.	Team	Car
1935	Aston Clinton Speed Trails	1st		Austin 7 "Einsitzer"
1936	Lands End Trial	Premier Award		1934 Wolseley Hornet Special AXK 777
1938	Easter Road Race	1st		Alta 2.0 s/c
1938	Lewes Speed Trials	1st		Alta S
1938	British Trophy	1st		Alta S
1938	Crystal Palace Cup	1st		Alta S
1938	Crystal Palace Grand Prix	2nd		Alta 12/50
1938	Crystal Palace Plate	2nd		Alta 2.0 s/c
1938	Imperial Trophy	2nd		Alta 12/50
1938	Imperial Plate	2nd		Alta 2.0 s/c
1939	Imperial Trophy	1st		Alta 12/50
1939	Imperial Plate	1st	George Abecassis	Alta 2.0 s/c
1939	Crystal Palace Plate	3rd	G. E. Abecassis	Alta 2.0 s/c
1946	MAC International Hill Climb	2nd		Alta S
1946	Gransden Lodge Trophy	2nd		Alta
1947	Bo'ness Hill Climb	1st		Bugatti Type 59
1947	British Hill Climb Championship	2nd		Bugatti Type 59
1947	SAK Stockholm Grand Prix	2nd		ERA A-Type
1947	Prix de Rome	2nd		Cisitalia-Fiat D46
1947	Gransden Trophy	2nd		Bugatti Type 59
1947	JMC & LCC Hill Climb	2nd		Bugatti Type 59
1947	KAK Winter Grand Prix	3rd		ERA A-Type
1947	Ulster Trophy	3rd		ERA A-Type
1947	Craigantlet Hillclimb	3rd		Bugatti Type 59
1948	Jersey International Road Race	2nd		Maserati 6CM
1951	Winfield Formula 2 Cup	2nd	H. W. Motors Ltd.	HWM-Alta 51
1951	Madgwick Cup	3rd	H. W. Motors Ltd.	HWM
1951	Hastings Trophy	3rd	H. W. Motors Ltd.	HWM
1952	Ibsley Grand Prix	2nd	H. W. Motors Ltd.	HWM-Alta 52
1952	Silverstone International	3rd	David Brown	Aston Martin DB3
1952	Jersey International Road Race	3rd	David Brown	Aston Martin DB3
1953	Goodwood International	1st	H. W. Motors	HWM-Jaguar
1953	Grand Prix, 12 Hours of Sebring	2nd	Aston Martin Ltd.	Aston Martin DB3
1954	Silverstone International	2nd	H. W. Motors	HWM-Jaguar
1954	Hedemoraloppet	2nd	H. W. Motors	HWM-Jaguar
1954	Goodwood International	3rd	H. W. Motors	HWM-Jaguar
1955	AMOC USAF Trophy	1st	H. W. Motors	HWM-Jaguar
1955	BM Trophy	1st	H. W. Motors	HWM-Jaguar
1955	RedeX Trophy	1st	H. W. Motors	HWM-Jaguar
1955	Brighton Speed Trials	2nd	H. W. Motors	HWM-Jaguar

=== Complete Formula One World Championship results ===
(key)

Year	Entrant	Chassis	Engine	1	2	3	4	5	6	7	8	WDC	Points
1951	HW Motors Ltd	HWM	Alta Straight-4	SUI; Ret	500	BEL	FRA	GBR	GER	ITA	ESP	NC	0
1952	HW Motors Ltd	HWM	Alta Straight-4	SUI; Ret	500	BEL	FRA	GBR	GER	NED	ITA	NC	0

=== Complete 24 Hours of Le Mans results ===
Year	Team	Co-Drivers	Car	Class	Laps	Pos.	Class Pos.
1950	(United Kingdom) Aston Martin Ltd.	(United Kingdom) Lance Macklin	Aston Martin DB2	S3.0	249	5th	1st
1951	(United Kingdom) Aston Martin Ltd.	(United Kingdom) Brian Shawe-Taylor	Aston Martin DB2	S3.0		5th	2nd
1953	(United Kingdom) Aston Martin Ltd.	(United Kingdom) Roy Salvadori	Aston Martin DB3S	S3.0	74	DNF	DNF

=== Complete 12 Hours of Sebring results ===
Year	Team	Co-Drivers	Car	Class	Laps	Pos.	Class Pos.
1953	(United Kingdom) Aston Martin, Ltd.	(United Kingdom) Reg Parnell	Aston Martin DB3	S3.0	172	2nd	1st

=== Complete Mille Miglia results ===
Year	Team	Co-Drivers	Car	Class	Pos.	Class Pos.
1952	(United Kingdom) Aston Martin Ltd.	(United Kingdom) Pat Griffith	Aston Martin DB2	GT+2.0	DNF	DNF
1953	(United Kingdom) Aston Martin Lagonda	(United Kingdom) Pat Griffith	Aston Martin DB3	S+2.0	DNF	DNF
1954	(United Kingdom) H.W. Motors	(United Kingdom) Denis Jenkinson	HWM-Jaguar	S+2.0	DNF	DNF
1955	(United Kingdom) Donald Healey Motor Company		Austin-Healey 100S	S+2.0	11th	5th

=== Complete 24 Hours of Spa results ===
Year	Team	Co-Drivers	Car	Class	Laps	Pos.	Class Pos.
1948		(United Kingdom) John Heath	Alta	S2.0	172	DNF	DNF

=== Complete 12 Hours of Reims results ===
Year	Team	Co-Drivers	Car	Class	Laps	Pos.	Class Pos.
1953	(United Kingdom) H.W. Motors	(Belgium) Paul Frère	HWM-Jaguar	S+2.0		DNF	DNF
1954	(United Kingdom) H.W. Motors	(United Kingdom) Lance Macklin	HWM-Jaguar	S+2.0		DNF	DNF

=== Complete 12 Hours of Hyères results ===
Year	Team	Co-Drivers	Car	Class	Laps	Pos.	Class Pos.
1954	(United Kingdom) H.W. Motors	(Australia) Tony Gaze	HWM-Jaguar			DSQ	DSQ
