= Graham Whitehead =

British racing driver (1922–1981)

- Born: 15 April 1922; Harrogate, North Yorkshire, England
- Died: 15 January 1981 (aged 58); Lower Basildon, Berkshire, England

Formula One World Championship career
- Nationality: (United Kingdom) British
- Active years: 1952
- Team: Privateer Alta
- Entries: 1
- Championships: 0
- Wins: 0
- Podiums: 0
- Career points: 0
- Pole positions: 0
- Fastest laps: 0
- First entry: 1952 British Grand Prix
24 Hours of Le Mans career
- Years: 1953-55, 1957-60
- Teams: Bristol Aeroplance Co., David Brown, Cooper Car Co. and A. G. Whitehead
- Best finish: 2nd (1958)
- Class wins: 0

Alfred Graham Whitehead (15 April 1922 – 15 January 1981) was a British racing driver from England. He participated in one Formula One World Championship Grand Prix, on 19 July 1952. He finished 12th, scoring no championship points. He also competed in several non-Championship Formula One races. He began racing his half-brother Peter's ERA, in 1951 and then drove his Formula Two Alta in the 1952 British Grand Prix. He finished second at 1958 24 Hours of Le Mans only weeks before the accident on the Tour de France in which Peter was killed. Graham escaped serious injury and later raced again with an Aston Martin and Ferrari 250GT before stopping at the end of 1961.

Whitehead finished second in the first Goodwood Nine Hours race in 1952 co driving American Tom Cole's Ferrari.

== Racing record ==
=== Career highlights ===
| Season | Series | Position | Team | Car |
|---|---|---|---|---|
| 1951 | WHDCC Trophy | 2nd | | ERA B-Type |
| | BRDC International Trophy | 3rd | A. G. Whitehead | ERA B-Type |
| | Kenning Trophy | 3rd | | ERA B-Type |
| 1952 | Goodwood Nine Hours | 2nd | Tom Cole | Ferrari 225 S |
| 1956 | Grand Prix des Frontières | 3rd | Graham Whitehead | Aston Martin DB3S |
| 1958 | Whitsun Trophy | 1st | | Lister-Jaguar |
| | Eläintarhanajo | 2nd | | Aston Martin DB3S |
| | 24 Heures du Mans | 2nd | A.G. Whitehead | Aston Martin DB3S |
| 1959 | Eläintarhanajo | 3rd | | Aston Martin DBR1/300 |
| 1960 | Eläintarhanajo | 3rd | | Lola-Climax Mk.1 |
| | Grande Prémio de Angola | 3rd | | Ferrari 250 GT |
| 1961 | Lombard Trophy | 2nd | Graham Whitehead | Ferrari 250 GT SWB |
| | Grand Prix de Spa [GT +2.0] | 2nd | A. G. Whitehead | Ferrari 250 GT SWB |

=== Complete Formula One World Championship results ===
(key)

| Year | Entrant | Chassis | Engine | 1 | 2 | 3 | 4 | 5 | 6 | 7 | 8 | WDC | Points |
|---|---|---|---|---|---|---|---|---|---|---|---|---|---|
| 1952 | Peter Whitehead | Alta F2 | Alta Straight-4 | SUI | 500 | BEL | FRA | GBR; 12 | GER | NED | ITA | NC | 0 |

=== Complete 24 Hours of Le Mans results ===
| Year | Team | Co-Drivers | Car | Class | Laps | Pos. | Class Pos. |
|---|---|---|---|---|---|---|---|
| 1953 | (United Kingdom) British Aeroplane Co. | (United Kingdom) Lance Macklin | Bristol 450 | S2.0 | 29 | DNF (Fire, accident) | |
| 1954 | (United Kingdom) David Brown | (United Kingdom) Ian Stewart | Aston Martin DB3S | S3.0 | 65 | DNF (Accident) | |
| 1955 | (United Kingdom) Cooper Cars Co | (United Kingdom) Peter Whitehead | Cooper-Jaguar T38 | S5.0 | 36 | DNF (Oil pressure) | |
| 1957 | (United Kingdom) D. Brown | (United Kingdom) Peter Whitehead | Aston Martin DBR2 | S5.0 | 81 | DNF (Gearbox) | |
| 1958 | (United Kingdom) A.G. Whitehead | (United Kingdom) Peter Whitehead | Aston Martin DB3S | S3.0 | 293 | 2nd | 2nd |
| 1959 | (United Kingdom) A.G. Whitehead | (United Kingdom) Brian Naylor | Aston Martin DBR1/300 | S3.0 | 52 | DNF (Accident) | |
| 1960 | (United Kingdom) A.G. Whitehead | (United Kingdom) Henry Taylor | Ferrari 250 GT SWB | GT3.0 | 258 | DNF (Engine) | |

=== Complete 12 Hours of Reims results ===
| Year | Team | Co-Drivers | Car | Class | Laps | Pos. | Class Pos. |
|---|---|---|---|---|---|---|---|
| 1954 | (United Kingdom) H. W. Motord | (Australia) Tony Gaze | HWM-Jaguar | | 206 | 7th | 7th |

=== Complete 12 Hours of Hyères results ===
| Year | Team | Co-Drivers | Car | Class | Laps | Pos. | Class Pos. |
|---|---|---|---|---|---|---|---|
| 1953 | | (Australia) Tony Gaze | Aston Martin DB3 | | | DNF | |
| 1954 | (United Kingdom) G. Whitehead | (United Kingdom) Pat Griffith | Aston Martin DB3S | | | DNF (Accident) | |
| 1955 | (United Kingdom) Graham Whitehead | (United Kingdom) Peter Whitehead | Aston Martin DB3S | S+2.0 | | DNF (Cooling) | |

=== Complete 12 Hours of Casablanca results ===
| Year | Team | Co-Drivers | Car | Class | Laps | Pos. | Class Pos. |
|---|---|---|---|---|---|---|---|
| 1953 | (United Kingdom) Graham Whitehead | (United Kingdom) Peter Whitehead | Aston Martin DB3 | S+2.0 | | 5th | 4th |
