= Lance Macklin =

British racing driver (1919–2002)

- Born: 2 September 1919; Kensington, London, England
- Died: 29 August 2002 (aged 82); Tenterden, Kent, England
- Children: 3

Formula One World Championship career
- Nationality: (United Kingdom) British
- Active years: 1952 – 1955
- Team(s): HWM, privateer Maserati
- Entries: 15 (13 starts)
- Championships: 0
- Wins: 0
- Podiums: 0
- Career points: 0
- Pole positions: 0
- Fastest laps: 0
- First entry: 1952 Swiss Grand Prix
- Last entry: 1955 British Grand Prix

Lance Noel Macklin (2 September 1919 – 29 August 2002) was a British racing driver from England. He participated in 15 Formula One World Championship Grands Prix, debuting on 18 May 1952. He was involved in the 1955 Le Mans disaster, starting the initial chain reaction after a dangerous manoeuvre by Mike Hawthorn.

== Early life ==
Macklin's father was the automotive entrepreneur Noel Macklin, founder of both the Invicta and Railton car companies, as well as Fairmile Marine, a manufacturer of motor gun and torpedo boats during World War II. Macklin was born in Kensington, and educated at Eton College. He volunteered for service with the Royal Navy in 1939 and (in line with his father's business) was assigned to work on motor gun boats.

== Motoring career ==
On demobilisation after the Second World War, Macklin followed his early ambition and became a racing driver, although an early attempt to enter a race on the Isle of Man was refused on grounds that he had no experience.

Macklin secured an entry to the 1948 Grand Prix des Frontières, and practised for the event by driving his Invicta at high speeds on public roads, teaching himself to four-wheel drift around Belgrave Square in London's Mayfair. He impressed in the race and eventually earned a signing with Aston Martin. He was made a reserve driver for Le Mans and raced at the Spa 24 Hours, finishing fifth.

Macklin finished fifth at Le Mans in 1950 alongside teammate and HWM owner George Abecassis. Abecassis invited him to join HWM for several races, culminating with victory in the 1952 BRDC International Trophy, his biggest success in motor racing. HWM also gave Macklin his debut in the Formula One World Championship, but the small team was not competitive against the better-funded works entries and he scored no world championship points. While at HWM, Macklin formed a close bond with young teammate Stirling Moss.

Macklin returned to Le Mans with Aston Martin in 1951, finishing third overall and taking his second S3.0 class victory, although class victories were not celebrated at that time. He left Aston Martin in 1952, dissatisfied with his retaining fee, and joined Bristol for the following year. The new team found little success, failing even to start the 1952 12 Hours of Reims, but such issues typically did not faze him. Macklin's social confidence and smooth demeanour made him popular with women, and he would sometimes be more interested in them than racing. Abecassis had been critical of this easy-going attitude: "He never cared whether he started in a race or not... Sometimes it was a nightmare to make him practice at all. If there was some blonde he was after he just wouldn't show up."

=== Role in the 1955 Le Mans disaster ===
In the 1955 24 Hours of Le Mans, Macklin was involved in the most catastrophic accident in racing history, which killed Pierre Levegh and 83 spectators and became known as the "1955 Le Mans disaster". Macklin swerved to avoid hitting the Jaguar of Mike Hawthorn, who was braking hard in a late attempt to pit, and moved into the path of Levegh's car causing it to clip his. Although Macklin's car crashed, he was uninjured. Macklin was deeply affected by the incident. He felt that Hawthorn had tried to alleviate himself of responsibility, and that the racing community was turning the blame to him as a result.

Macklin continued to race, but another tragic experience followed in the Tourist Trophy at Dundrod. He crashed his Austin-Healey 100S avoiding an accident in which Jim Mayers and William T. Smith were killed. Soon after, Macklin retired from motor sport at the urging of his then-girlfriend.

== Business career ==
Macklin joined Facel Vega in Paris, running the export division until the company failed in 1963, when he began working for London car dealership H.R. Owen.

== Personal life ==
Macklin was married twice; firstly to Shelagh and subsequently to Gillian. He had two children from his first marriage and one from the second.

== Later years ==
Macklin later moved to Spain, but returned to England when he became ill. He died on 29 August 2002 in Tenterden, Kent, four days before his 83rd birthday.

== Racing record ==
=== Complete Formula One results ===
(key)

Year	Entrant	Chassis	Engine	1	2	3	4	5	6	7	8	9	WDC	Points
1952	HW Motors Ltd	HWM	Alta Straight-4	SUI; Ret	500	BEL; 11	FRA; 9	GBR; 15	GER	NED; 8	ITA; DNQ		NC	0
1953	HW Motors Ltd	HWM	Alta Straight-4	ARG	500	NED; Ret	BEL; Ret	FRA; Ret	GBR; Ret	GER	SUI; Ret	ITA; Ret	NC	0
1954	HW Motors Ltd	HWM	Alta Straight-4	ARG	500	BEL	FRA; Ret	GBR	GER	SUI	ITA	ESP	NC	0
1955	Stirling Moss Ltd	Maserati 250F	Maserati Straight-6	ARG	MON; DNQ	500	BEL	NED	GBR; 8	ITA			NC	0

=== Complete 24 Hours of Le Mans results ===
Year	Team	Co-Drivers	Car	Class	Laps	Pos.	Class Pos.
1950	(United Kingdom) Aston Martin Ltd.	(United Kingdom) George Abecassis	Aston Martin DB2	S3.0	249	5th	1st
1951	(United Kingdom) Aston Martin Ltd.	(United Kingdom) Eric Thompson	Aston Martin DB2	S3.0	257	3rd	1st
1952	(United Kingdom) Aston Martin Ltd.	(United Kingdom) Peter Collins	Aston Martin DB3 Spyder	S3.0	?	DNF (Accident)	
1953	(United Kingdom) Bristol Aeroplane Company	(United Kingdom) Graham Whitehead	Bristol 450 Coupé	S2.0	29	DNF (Fire)	
1954	(Italy) Automobili O.S.C.A.	(France) Pierre Leygonie	O.S.C.A. MT-4	S1.5	247	DSQ (Abandoned vehicle)	
1955	(United Kingdom) Lance Macklin (private entrant)	(United Kingdom) Les Leston	Austin-Healey 100 S	S3.0	28	DNF (Accident damage)	

=== Complete 12 Hours of Sebring results ===
Year	Team	Co-Drivers	Car	Class	Laps	Pos.	Class Pos.
1954	(United Kingdom) Donald Healey Ltd.	(United States) George Huntoon	Austin-Healey 100	S3.0	163	3rd	1st
1955	(United Kingdom) Donald Healey Motor Co.	(United Kingdom) Stirling Moss	Austin-Healey 100 S	S3.0	176	6th	5th
1956	(United Kingdom) Donald Healey Motors Co. Ltd.	(United Kingdom) Archie Scott Brown	Austin-Healey 100 S	S3.0	110	DNF (Starter)	

Sporting positions
Preceded by Reg Parnell	BRDC International Trophy; Winner; 1952	Succeeded by Mike Hawthorn
