= Peter Walker (racing driver) =

English racing driver (1912–1984)

- Nationality: (United Kingdom) British
- Born: Peter Douglas Conyers Walker; 7 October 1912 Huby, Yorkshire, England
- Died: 1 March 1984 (aged 71) Newtown, Worcestershire, England
Peter Walker
Formula One World Championship career
- Active years: 1950–1951, 1955
- Team(s): privateer ERA and Maserati, BRM, Connaught
- Entries: 4
- Championships: 0
- Wins: 0
- Podiums: 0
- Career points: 0
- Pole positions: 0
- Fastest laps: 0
- First entry: 1950 British Grand Prix
- Last entry: 1955 British Grand Prix
24 Hours of Le Mans career
- Years: 1951–1956
- Teams: P. D. C. Walker, Jaguar Cars Ltd., Aston Martin, David Brown.
- Best finish: 1st (1951)
- Class wins: 1 (1951)

Peter Douglas Conyers Walker (7 October 1912 – 1 March 1984) was an English racing driver. He was born in Huby, Yorkshire, and died in Newtown, Worcestershire. He proved a strong driver in most disciplines, but was most adept in sports cars, winning the 1951 24 Hours of Le Mans race, and the Goodwood Nine-Hours in 1955. He effectively retired after a crash in 1956 left him with serious injuries.

== Early life and pre-war racing ==
Peter 'Skid' Walker was born in Yorkshire in October 1912. He really started his racing career in 1935, after linking up with Peter Whitehead. He enjoyed success in both circuit racing and hillclimbing with an ERA prior to World War II, with victories at Brooklands and Donington Park. Throughout this period, he could be found racing Whitehead's ERAs. His aggressive, sliding style made him a crowd favourite and gained him a little bit of notoriety. After the hostilities finished, he returned to the sport.

== Racing career ==
Although competitive before the war, Walker's aggressive style and experience helped him become even more successful. In fact, he was one of handful of driver who could get the ERA E-type to perform. In 1948, he was able to put together some impressive performances both in hillclimbing, but in Grand Prix Racing. One of those races was the inaugural British Grand Prix, at RAF Silverstone. However, the race did not go to plan. He entered the race driving an ERA E-type, but the manufacturer was unable to deliver the chassis in time, so Walker used his older B-type. During the race, he survived the massive attrition to finish in 11th place, 12 laps adrift of the winner, Luigi Villoresi.

=== Grand Prix racer ===
In the inaugural World Championship of Drivers, Walker was present at the very first race, the RAC British Grand Prix at Silverstone. In fact, he was one of the first to enter the event, in his own ERA E-type. After qualifying tenth, he shared the race driving duties with Tony Rolt, pitting after just two laps to hand the car over. Unfortunately, the pace show in qualifying wasn't matched by its endurance, was Rolt retiring the car on the fifth lap due to gearbox problems. Walker's inaugural Formula One season ended there, as he did not contest another Grand Prix that season.

A month later his victory at Circuit de la Sarthe, he finished seventh in the RAC British Grand Prix in a supercharged 1.5-litre V16 BRM Type 15, with his teammate Reg Parnell in fifth. Both drivers legs were so badly burnt by heat from the engines and exhaust systems that even walking was painful. Gregor Grant reported: "Parnell and Walker saved the day for British motor racing. Their heroism in sticking to their task whilst suffering from agonising burns will enable the BRM designers to go ahead and modify the cars to make them completely raceworthy." Sadly, Walker did not race the BRM again.

After four years away, Walker returned to Formula One, racing twice. The first was aboard Stirling Moss's Maserati 250F, where he retired from the Grote Prijs van Nederland, with mechanical issues. For the next race of the season, RAC British Grand Prix, at Aintree, he shared a works Connaught Type B with Rolt. In what turned to be his last Grand Prix, the car was retired with a failed throttle after just 19 of the 90 laps.

=== Sports Car Ace ===
Walker performances of the hills brought him to the attention of Lofty England, the manager of Jaguar's sports car racing team, rewarded him with a drive in a Jaguar XK120 in this newly launched car's first race at Silverstone in 1949. Walker finished second, but won at same event 12 months later, in an alloy-bodied works-prepared XK120.

After the success of XK120, they developed an endurance racing version, the XK120C, or C-Type and need a driver. Walker was approached and with it, Jaguar embarked on their first racing programme aimed at winning the 24 Heures du Mans outright. On its first attempt, just six weeks after completion, Walker achieved the victory for which he is best remembered, when he and co-driver, Whitehead won the 1951 race. Of the three entered, they filled the top three positions after four hours. However, after just 50 laps, only Walker's remained in the race. The victory providing the Coventry marque with much publicity and acclaim.

Still nursing his burns from the British Grand Prix, Walker dismissed them as little more than "a bit of a nuisance", he arrived at Dundrod to race a C-Type in the RAC Tourist Trophy. Jaguar cleaned up, taking all three places in the podium. As for Walker, he finished in a dutiful second behind Moss.

"He was fast in the car and easy to get along with – a regular guy – which is why I always preferred him as a co-driver."

— Stirling Moss

In the 1953 race, Walker shared his works C-Type with Stirling Moss, and the pair led in the early stages until the engine problems intervened. Moss pitted on lap 20, and the mechanics set to work. The problem was only solved after a second stop, when the mechanics changed a blocked fuel filter. Moss and Walker would finish second, four laps down on their winning teammates, Rolt and Duncan Hamilton. This would be the closest Walker would ever get to a second victory at Le Mans.

Walker was paired again with Moss for the Goodwood Nine-Hour and they led comfortably for the first eight hours, until the car retired. Next up was the RAC Tourist Trophy, where Walker would break the lap record, but again hit mechanical trouble and Moss managed to bring the car home in third.

Although Walker remained with Jaguar for 1954, the season wasn't as successful, despite teaming with Moss for Le Mans in a Jaguar D-Type, when they retired in the 12th hour with brake problems. At the end of the season, England asked Walker to make himself available for pre-season testing, ahead of the 1955 season. Walker failed to respond and joined Aston Martin. This proved not to be a good move, as Jaguar's great hat-trick of Le Mans victories was about to begin. Some consolation to Walker, was his fine victory in the Goodwood Nine-hour, a race in which shared an Aston Martin DB3S with Dennis Poore.

"Peter was a charming bloke and I believe that had he been able to go motor racing full-time instead of four or five times a year, he could have been very good indeed. Quite often, on the fast circuits he was as quick, if not quicker than Moss."

— Lofty England

Walker largely retired from racing after crashing a DB3S at Le Mans in 1956. He made a mistake in the 16th hour of the race, whilst running strongly. He suffered what would basically turn into a career-ending accident. The car skidded on the wet track near the Dunlop Bridge and hit the wall – ultimately sliding upside down on the track.

Walker did test and race again in 1957. In the spring, he tested for Rob Walker Racing Team, in their Connaught Type B at Goodwood, and subsequently drove the car in a one-off race, the Gran Premio di Siracusa the following season. He was classified in eighth place despite spinning and stalling the car late on.

== Away from the track ==
After he retired from the sport, Walker took up rabbit and chinchilla farming with Lady Ripley for a while, and even designed a type of cattle grid, but both ventures came to nothing.

Walker died on 1 March 1984, after suffering from dementia and pneumonia. He is remembered today by his peers like Moss, who describes him as one of life's "great guys".

== Racing record ==
=== Career highlights ===
Season	Series	Position	Team	Car
1936	Nuffield Trophy	2nd	Peter Whitehead	ERA B-Type
	Donington Grand Prix	3rd	Peter Whitehead	ERA B-Type
1949	Silverstone International	2nd	Peter Walker	Jaguar XK120
	Goodwood Trophy	2nd		ERA E-Type
1950	Silverstone International [+2.0]	1st	Peter Walker	Jaguar XK120
1951	Les 24 Heures du Mans	1st	Peter Walker	Jaguar C-Type
	RAC Tourist Trophy	2nd	Jaguar Cars	Jaguar C-Type
1952	Hastings Trophy	2nd		Cooper-ERA
1953	Les 24 Heures du Mans	2nd	Jaguar Cars Ltd.	Jaguar C-Type
	BMCLCC Trophy	2nd		Cooper-ERA
	RAC Tourist Trophy	3rd	Jaguar Cars Ltd.	Jaguar C-Type
1954	Silverstone International	3rd	Ecurie Ecosse	Jaguar C-Type
1955	Snetterton International	1st	Connaught Engineering	Connaught B Type
	Goodwood Nine-Hours	1st	Aston Martin	Aston Martin DB3S

=== Complete Formula One World Championship results ===
(key)

Year	Entrant	Chassis	Engine	1	2	3	4	5	6	7	8	WDC	Points
1950	Peter Walker	ERA E-Type	ERA Straight-6	GBR; Ret*	MON	500	SUI	BEL	FRA	ITA		NC	0
1951	BRM Ltd.	BRM P15	BRM V16	SUI	500	BEL	FRA	GBR; 7	GER	ITA	ESP	NC	0
1955	Stirling Moss	Maserati 250F	Maserati Straight-6	ARG	MON	500	BEL	NED; Ret				NC	0
1955	Rob Walker Racing Team	Connaught Type B	Alta Straight-4						GBR; Ret*	ITA		NC	0

* Indicates shared drive with Tony Rolt.

=== Complete 24 Hours of Le Mans results ===
Year	Team	Co-Drivers	Car	Class	Laps	Pos.	Class Pos.
1951	(United Kingdom) Peter Walker	(United Kingdom) Peter Whitehead	Jaguar C-Type	S5.0	267	1st	1st
1952	(United Kingdom) Peter Walker	(United Kingdom) Stirling Moss	Jaguar C-Type	S5.0		DNF (Engine)	
1953	(United Kingdom) Jaguar Cars Ltd.	(United Kingdom) Stirling Moss	Jaguar C-Type	S5.0	300	2nd	2nd
1954	(United Kingdom) Jaguar Cars Ltd.	(United Kingdom) Stirling Moss	Jaguar D-Type	S5.0	92	DNF (Brakes)	
1955	(United Kingdom) Aston Martin Ltd.	(United Kingdom) Roy Salvadori	Aston Martin DB3S	S3.0	105	DNF (Engine)	
1956	(United Kingdom) David Brown	(United Kingdom) Roy Salvadori	Aston Martin DB3S	S3.0	175	DNF (Accident)	

=== Complete 12 Hours of Reims results ===
Year	Team	Co-Drivers	Car	Class	Laps	Pos.	Class Pos.
1954	(United Kingdom) Jaguar Cars Ltd.	(United Kingdom) Stirling Moss	Jaguar C-Type			DNF (Halfshaft)	

Sporting positions
Preceded by Louis Rosier; Jean-Louis Rosier	Winner of the 24 Hours of Le Mans; 1951; With: Peter Whitehead	Succeeded by Hermann Lang; Fritz Riess
