= Aston Martin DB3S =

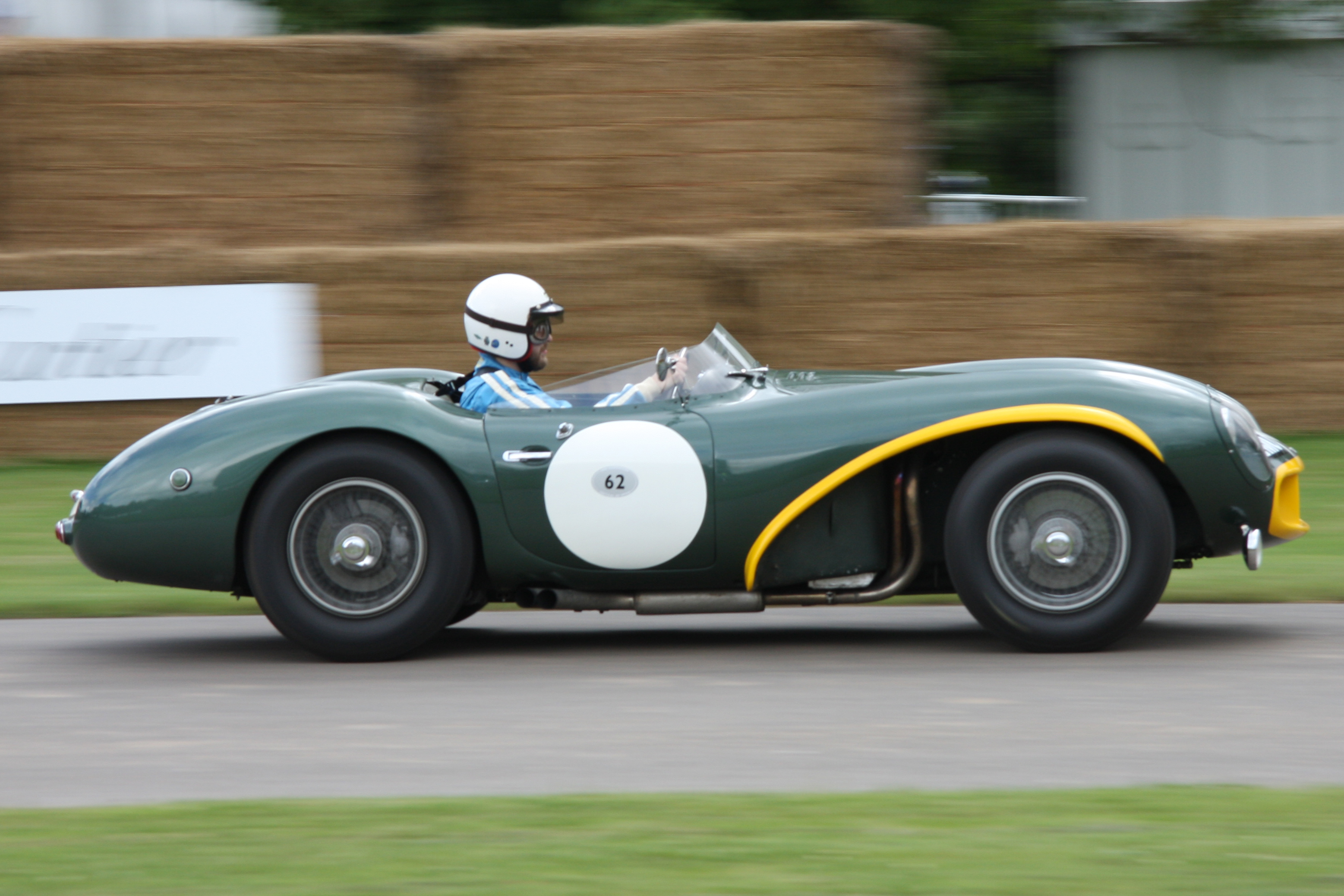
- An Aston Martin DB3S, at Goodwood Festival of Speed 2008
- Category: Le Mans Racer Sports car racing
- Constructor: Aston Martin Lagonda LTD
- Designers: Willie Watson, Frank Feeley (Body)

Technical specifications
- Chassis: Twin-tubular design, aluminium body, open two seater
- Suspension (front): Torsion bar and trailing arms
- Suspension (rear): Torsion bars, trailing arms, De Dion tube and central slide
- Length: 12 ft 10 in (3,910 mm)
- Width: 4 ft 11 in (1,500 mm)
- Height: 3 ft 5 in (1,040 mm)
- Axle track: 4 ft 1 in
- Wheelbase: 7 ft 3 in (2,210 mm)
- Engine: Lagonda 2,992 cc Straight six, Twin OHC, (later a twin-plug head), FR Layout, 3 twin-choke Weber 35 DCO carburettors
- Transmission: David Brown S430, 4-speed Manual, 9" single clutch
- Weight: 1,850 lb (840 kg) dry 1,940 lb (880 kg)
- Tyres: 16 x 6

Competition history
- Notable entrants: (United Kingdom) David Brown
- Notable drivers: (United Kingdom) Tony Brooks, (United Kingdom) Reg Parnell, (United Kingdom) Peter Collins, (United Kingdom) Peter Walker, (United Kingdom) Roy Salvadori, (United Kingdom) Noël Cunningham-Reid, (United States) Carroll Shelby, (United Kingdom) Stirling Moss
- Debut: 1953 24 Hours of Le Mans

The Aston Martin DB3S is a sports racing car that was built by Aston Martin. Following the failure of the heavy and uncompetitive Aston Martin DB3 designed by Eberan Eberhorst; William Watson, employed as Eberhorst's assistant, presented an alternative design to John Wyer, Aston Martin's competitions manager, whose assistance was needed as Eberhorst could well oppose being up-staged. In total 31 cars were made, with 11 works cars and 20 cars being sold for customer use.

The DB3S was introduced in 1953 and proved significantly more successful than the Aston Martin DB3. Although the DB3S failed at Le Mans they went on to score a 1–2 at the Tourist Trophy at Dundrod in the 6th round of the inaugural World Sportscar Championship in 1953 to help Astons to 3rd in the championship. There was also a win in the non-championship Goodwood 9 Hours.

1954 was a less successful season with a third place in the Buenos Aires 1000 km being the high point. However the cars failed at the Sebring 12 hours, the Mille Miglia, Le Mans and the Tourist Trophy. 1955 saw a return to form. Astons missed the opening two rounds at Buenos Aires and Sebring and the sole DB3S failed to finish at the Mille Miglia but Collins/Frere finished 2nd at Le Mans and Walker/Poore scored a 4th at the Tourist Trophy behind the dominant 1, 2, 3 of the Mercedes 300SLR to finish 5th in the championship. There was also time for another win in the non championship Goodwood 9 Hours.

By 1956 the design was starting to show its age and Astons were putting their resources into the development of the new DBR1 but the DB3S still finished 4th at Sebring and 5th at the Nurburging 1000 km to finish 4th in the championship together with another second at Le Mans in the hands of Moss/Collins although due to the change of regulations following the 1955 disaster this latter event was a non championship race. The DBR1 now took over as Astons main sports racer, but there was one last swan song for the DB3S in the hands of the Whitehead brothers at Le Mans in 1958 with a second place after all the works DBR1s failed to finish. The car won the 2013 Gran Turismo Trophy at Pebble Beach Concours d'Elegance.

== Chassis numbers ==
The 11 works cars had chassis numbers from DB3S/1 to DB3S/11, with the 11th works car never being raced by Aston Martin. The 20 customer cars had three digit chassis numbers, from DB3S/101 to DB3S/120. In 1994 a recreation car was assembled from original spare parts at Aston Service Dorset. This car carries the continuation chassis number DB3S/121.

== Coupés ==
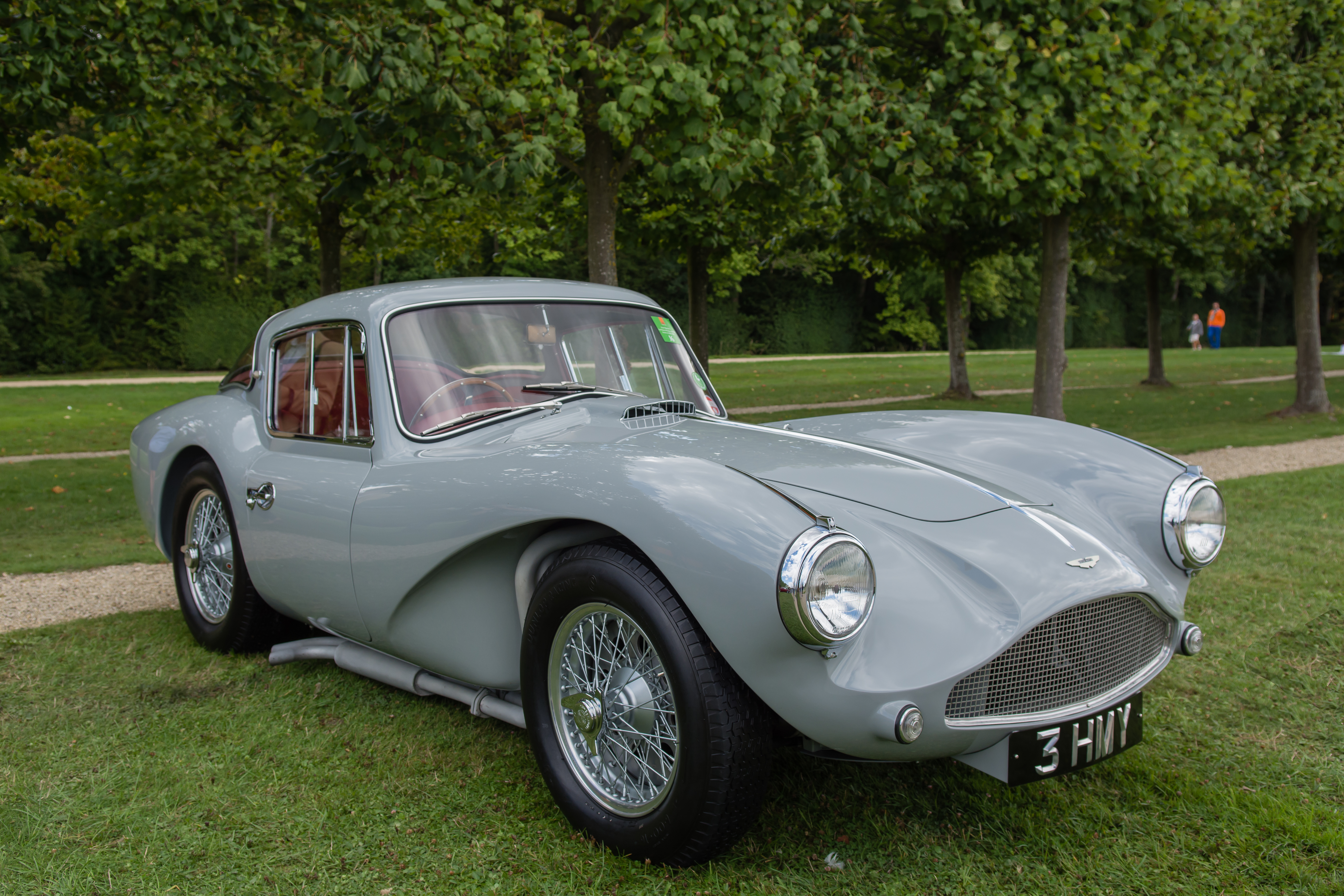
DB3S/119 Coupé shown in September 2015 at the Chantilly Arts & Elegance Concours

Originally two works Aston Martin DB3S fixed head coupés were made. The change was to make them more aerodynamic than the open top bodied cars. However, they were unstable at high speeds and both crashed at the 1954 24 Hours of Le Mans. Both coupés were then rebuilt as open bodied cars. Three of the customer cars were also fitted with similar coupé bodies.

== Chassis information ==
Included are a list of victories by each chassis under Aston Martin.

- DB3S/1
  - 1953 Charterhall
  - 1953 British Empire Trophy
  - 1953 Charterhall(2)
  - 1953 Castle Coombe
  - 1954 Silverstone
- DB3S/2
  - 1953 B.A.R.C. Goodwood
- DB3S/3
  - 1954 Silverstone
- DB3S/4
  - 1953 B.R.D.C. Silverstone
  - 1953 Ulster TT Dundrod
- DB3S/5 - Converted from David Brown's road car
  - 1954 B.O.C. Prescott
  - 1955 B.A.R.C. Crystal Palace
  - 1956 B.A.R.C. Goodwood
  - 1956 B.A.R.C. Aintree
  - 1956 B.A.R.C. Aintree(2)
- DB3S/6 - Originally a coupé, rebodied as an open top car.
  - 1955 B.R.D.C. Silverstone
- DB3S/7 - Originally a coupé, rebodied as an open top car.
  - 1955 B.A.R.C. Aintree
  - 1955 Silverstone

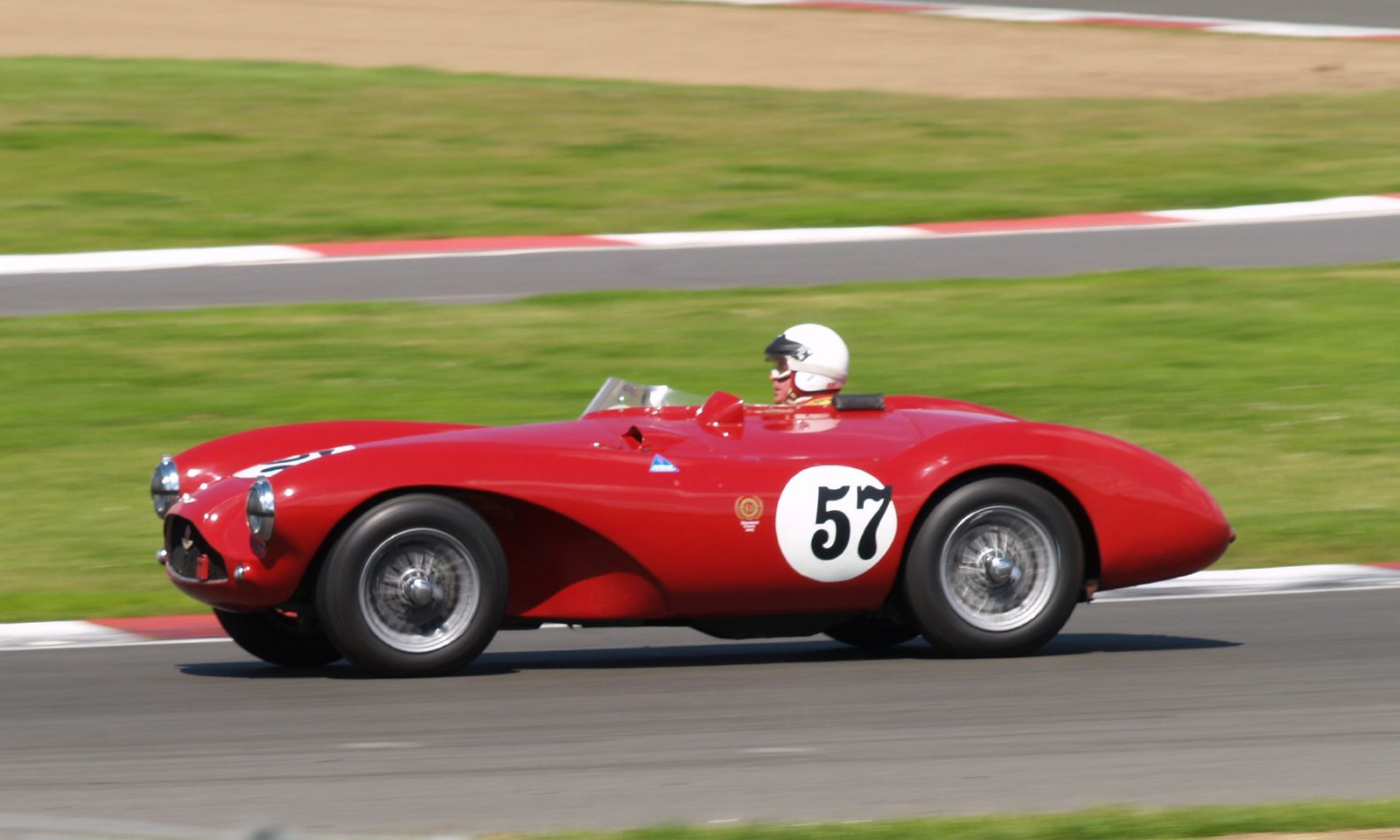
The Aston Martin DB3S/110 at Silverstone Classic 2007

  - 1955 B.A.R.C. Goodwood
  - 1956 B.A.R.C. Goodwood
- DB3S/8
  - 1955 Spa Production Sports Car race
  - 1955 Oulton Park
- DB3S/9 - Featured an aerodynamic headrest
  - 1956 Daily Herald International Trophy - Oulton Park
- DB3S/10 - Featured an aerodynamic headrest
  - None
- DB3S/11 - Not raced under Aston Martin
  - None
