= Germaine Rouault =

Female French racing driver (1905-1982)

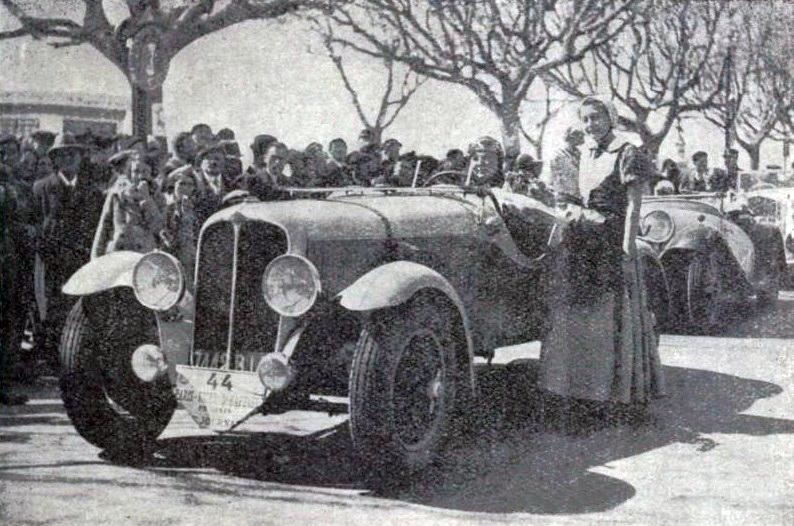
Rouault with her Delahaye, after her victory at the 1937 Paris-Nice race

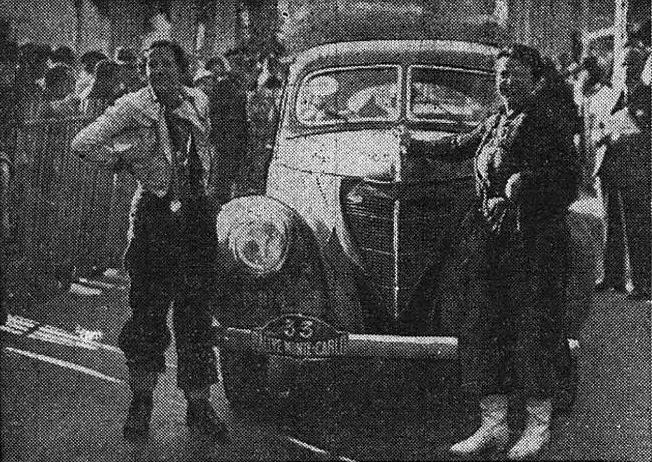
Rouault at the 1938 Monte Carlo Rally

Germaine Rouault (16 August 1905 in Paris – 4 November 1982 in Sevran) was a French racing driver.

== Career ==
Rouault came to motorsport in the 1930s and was supported by Odette Siko at the beginning of her career. Siko was a few years older and already an experienced racer. Rouault quickly rose in fame and popularity with her third place finish in the 1933 Monte Carlo Rally. She competed there six more times before the Second World War, regularly in French vehicles including Renault, Salmson and Matford. The event organized the Automobile Club de Monaco on the fashionable Côte d’Azur suited her style. The attractive Parisian was always stylishly dressed and was known to complete rallies wearing long skirts. On the social side of motorsport events, she spent time in the company of her fellow racing drivers and compatriots, including the dancer and "Bugatti Queen" Hellé Nice (1900–1984), Anne-Cécile Rose-Itier (1890–1980) and Yvonne Simon (1917–1992).

In the years leading up to the war, road racing was very popular in France. These races, which often went from city to city, became her specialty. A frequent partner was Lucy O'Reilly Schell, the wife of Laury Schell and mother of Formula 1 driver Harry Schell. Driving a Delahaye, the duo finished the 1935 Paris — Saint-Raphaël rally second overall and won the 1937 Paris–Nice event. She also had success on circuits: she finished seventh in the 1935 Grand Prix de la Marne and in the same position again in a Delahaye 135CS at the 1937 3 Hours of Marseille. Her greatest success in sports car racing was third place overall in the 1938 12 Hours of Paris at the Autodrome de Linas-Montlhéry with Anne-Cécile Rose-Itier in a Delahaye 135CS Coupé.

After the end of the Second World War, she returned to racing at the 1948 12 Hours of Paris and brought her aging Delahaye to the 1949 running of 24 Hours of Spa. In the 1930s she had declared that she would race exclusively with women as teammates. In Spa, Yvonne Simon filled this role, the team finishing eleventh in the final classification. Other partners included Gilberte Thirion in the Rally of Morocco and Régine Gordine, with whom she drove in the 24 Hours of Le Mans and in the 1952 Tour de France Automobile. She also regularly competed in the Monte Carlo Rally from 1950 in various Simca and Renault models. She began racing less frequently in the mid-1950s; her final event was the 1956 Monte Carlo Rally.

In 1935, with Jacques Delorme, Anne-Cécile Itier and Hellé Nice, she founded the U.S.A. (Union sportive automobile), as association of independent drivers, and served as the organization's secretary general. In 1949, Rouault was reportedly trying to revive the Rallye Feminin, but was struggling to find enough women drivers, noting that several women's driving clubs hadn't reformed following the war.

== Results ==
=== Rallye Paris – Saint-Raphaël Féminin ===
The Rallye Paris – Saint-Raphaël Féminin was a long-distance race through France open only to women. The prestigious race took place annually starting in 1929 and regularly covered a distance of 1500 to 2500 kilometers.

- 1935: 2nd place in a Delahaye Sport (behind Olga Thibault in a Peugeot 201 and ahead of Lucy O’Reilly Schell, also in a Delahaye Sport)
- 1936: 1st place in a Delahaye 135S
- 1937: 1st place (ahead of Yvonne Simon in a Hotchkiss Grand Sport and Simone des Forest)
- 1939: 2nd place (also a class win) in a Delahaye 135 (behind Yvonne Simon in a Hotchkiss Grand Sport and ahead of Betty Haig in an MG)

=== Rallye Monte Carlo – Coupe des Dames ===
- 1938: 1st place in a Matford (together with Madame J. D'Herlique, 7th place overall)
- 1950: 1st place in a Simca 8 (together with Regine Gordine, 16th place overall)

=== 24 Hours of Le Mans ===
Having raced in both the 1938 and 1950 runnings of Le Mans, Rouault is the only woman to have competed both pre- and post-war. Both of her Le Mans campaigns ended in retirements.

Year	Team	Vehicle	Teammate	Result	Reason for retirement
1938	(France) Fernande Roux and Germaine Rouault	Amilcar G36 Pegase Special	(France) Fernande Roux	Retirement	Engine failure
1950	(France) Mmes Rouault and Gordine	Simca-Gordini TMM	(France) Régine Gordine	Retirement	Accident
