= Yvonne Simon =

French racing driver

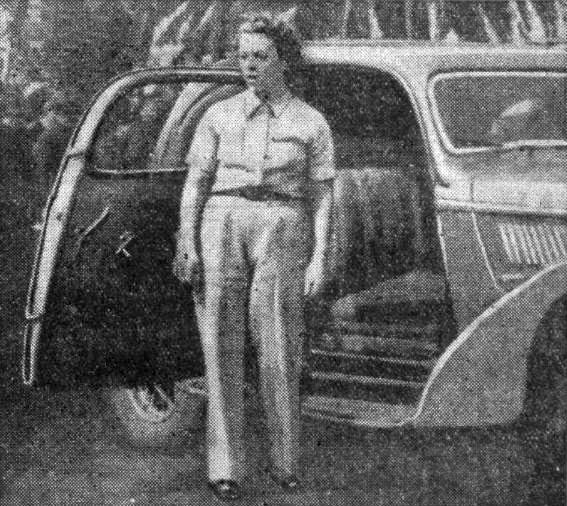
- Yvonne Simon during the 1939 Rallye Paris – Saint-Raphaël Féminin
- Born: Yvonne Marie Louise Hémart; December 6, 1910; Charmont-sous-Barbuise
- Died: August 16, 1992; Saint-Martin-de-Ré
- Occupation: Racing driver

Yvonne Marie Louise Simon (née Hémart; 1910–1992) was a French racing driver who participated in rallying, circuit races and endurance racing.

== Biography ==
Yvonne Marie Louise Simon (née Hémart) was born on 6 December 1910 in Charmont-sous-Barbuise, France. Other sources incorrectly report that she was born in 1917, in Troyes, Champagne-Ardenne or on 6 December 1906 in Charmont, Aube, France.

Simon died on 16 August 1992 in Saint-Martin-de-Ré.

== Racing career ==
Simon's racing career spanned the years from the mid-1930s to the mid-1950s.

One of her earliest racing appearances was in the 1937 Rallye Paris – Saint-Raphaël Féminin. Although she did not win in 1937, she placed second on her first attempt and would go on to win this event four times, finishing first in the last race held prior to World War II in 1939, and in three consecutive events after the war in 1952, '53, and '54.

Simon won the first running of a new event arranged in 1939. Racing drivers Anne-Cécile Itier and Jean Delorme formed the Union Sportive Automobile (USA). The USA launched a one-make racing series for women to be held prior to major Grand Prix events. On 11 June 1939 Simon won the inaugural race in the Championnat féminin de l'Union Sportive Automobile driving a Renault Juvaquatre on the Péronne circuit prior to the running of the Picardy Grand Prix.

Simon made two appearances at the 24 Hours of Le Mans endurance race, driving a 2 L Ferrari 166 MM both times.

== Racing record ==
=== Circuit racing ===
Grand Prix of Riems

- 1952 — Drove a 166 MM Ferrari to eighth place overall and fourth in class.

Bari Grand Prix

- 1952 — Held on 28 September, Simon drove Ferrari 166 MM #0018M to a thirteenth place finish.

Monza Grand Prix

- 1953 — Held on 29 June, Simon and Ferrari 166 MM #0018M rebodied as a Zagato Spyder finished eleventh overall; fourteenth in Heat 1 and eleventh in Heat 2.

Nimes Grand Prix

- 1954 — Held on 11 April. Simon took her 750 cc Panhard-Monopole to a fourth-place finish.

=== Rallys ===
Rallye Paris - Saint-Raphaël Féminin:

- 1937 — Drove a 3.5 L Hotchkiss 686 Grand Sport to a second place finish.
- 1939 — First place in a Hotchkiss 686 Grand Sport.
- 1951 — Held from 26 to 28 February. Drove a 2.0 L Ferrari 166MM.
- 1952 — Held from 27 February to 2 March. First place in an 1100 cc Renault 4CV.
- 1953 — Held from 18 to 22 February. First place in an 1100 cc Renault 4CV.
- 1954 — Held from 3 to 7 March. First place in a 750 cc Panhard-Monopole.

Lyon - Chamonix Rally

- 1938 — Held from 4 to 6 February. Won the Coupe des Dames in a Hotchkiss

Monte Carlo Rally

- 1938 — co-driver Suzanne Largeot, in a Hotchkiss 686 Grand Sport (3485 cm^{3}), 2^{e} de la Coupe des Dames du Monte-Carlo (same co-driver, same car).
- 1939 — co-driver Suzanne Largeot, in a Hotchkiss 686 Grand Sport (3485 cm^{3}), Coupe des Dames.
- 1951 — co-driver Régine Gordine, in a Simca 8 Sport.

=== Endurance racing ===
Paris 12 Hours

- 1938 — On 11 September Simon finished eighth with co-driver Suzanne Largeot in an 1100 cc Simca 8.

Spa 24 Hours

- 1949 — On 10 July Simon partnered with Germaine Rouault in a Delahaye-Delage. The pair finished eleventh overall with a first in the T4.0 class.

24 Hours of Le Mans

- 1950 — Driving 2 L V12 Ferrari 166 MM berlinetta #0042M for Luigi Chinetti with teammate Michel Kasse. Retired, out of fuel.
- 1951 — Driving 2 L V12 Ferrari 166 MM berlinetta #0042M for Chinetti with teammate Betty Haig. Fifteenth overall.

Mille Miglia

- 1951 — Drove Ferrari 166 MM Spider Vignale #0072E with teammate Alberico Cacciari to ninetieth place overall.

12 Hours of Reims

- 1953 — Simon and co-driver Jean Hémard drove their 750 cc Panhard-Monopole to a fourteenth place finish.
- 1954 — Simon and teammate Jean de Montrémy entered a 750 cc Panhard-Monopole, but did not finish due to an accident.

Bol d'Or

- 1955 — Drove a 750 cc Panhard-Monopole with teammate de Montrémy to a tenth place finish.

== Photo gallery ==
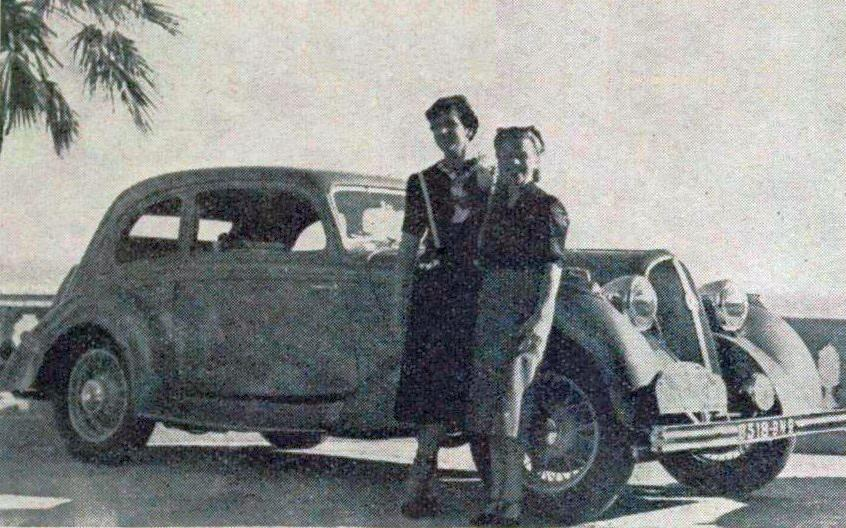
Suzanne Largeot (L.) and Yvonne Simon (R.), winners of the Coupe des Dames at the 1939 Monte Carlo rally in a Hotchkiss 686 Grand Sport.

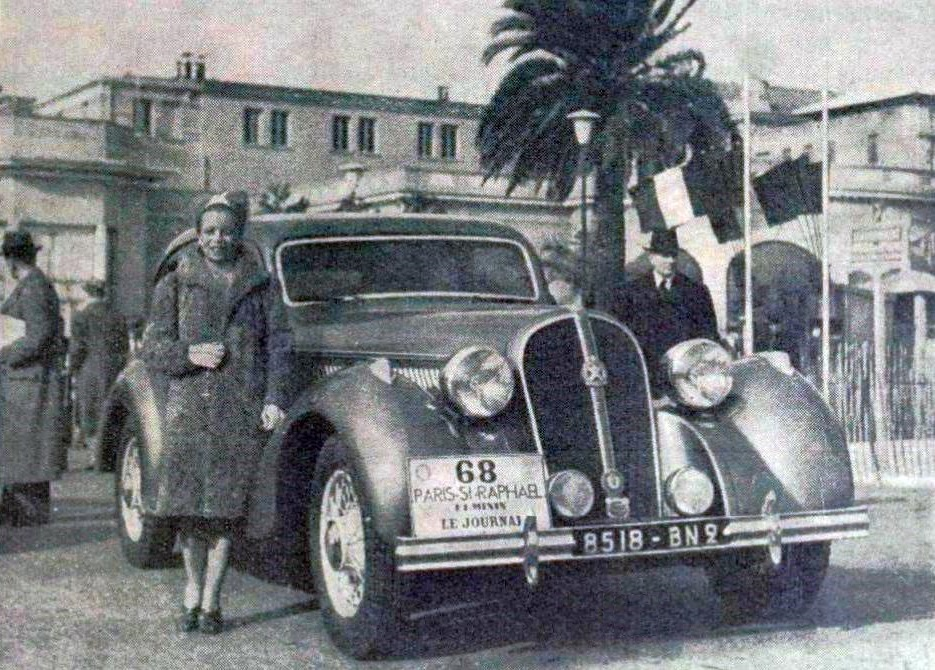
Yvonne Simon, winner of the 1939 Rallye Paris - Saint-Raphaël Féminin 1939, in a Hotchkiss GS.

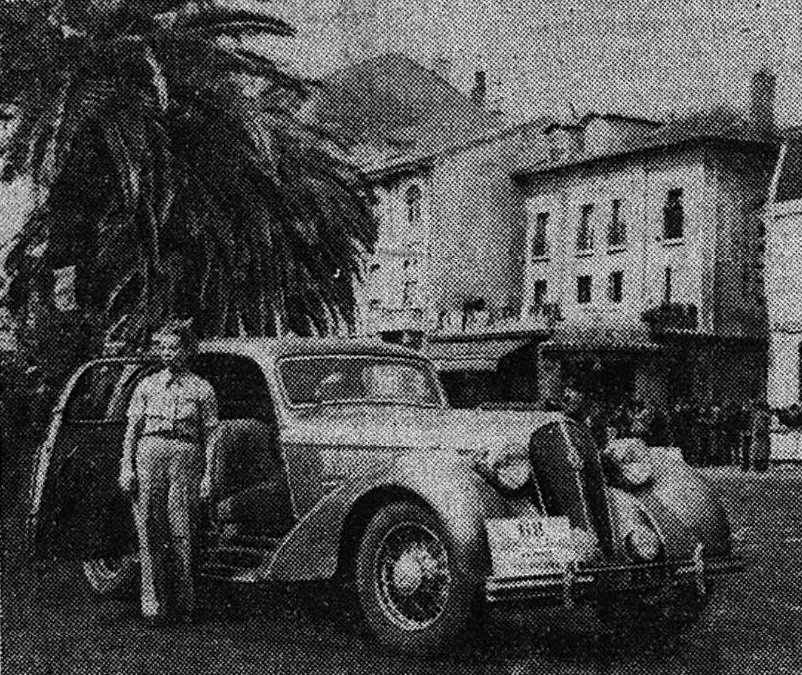
Yvonne Simon, in Saint-Raphael in 1939.
