= Anne-Cécile Itier =

French female (1890–1980) rally, hillclimb and circuit racer

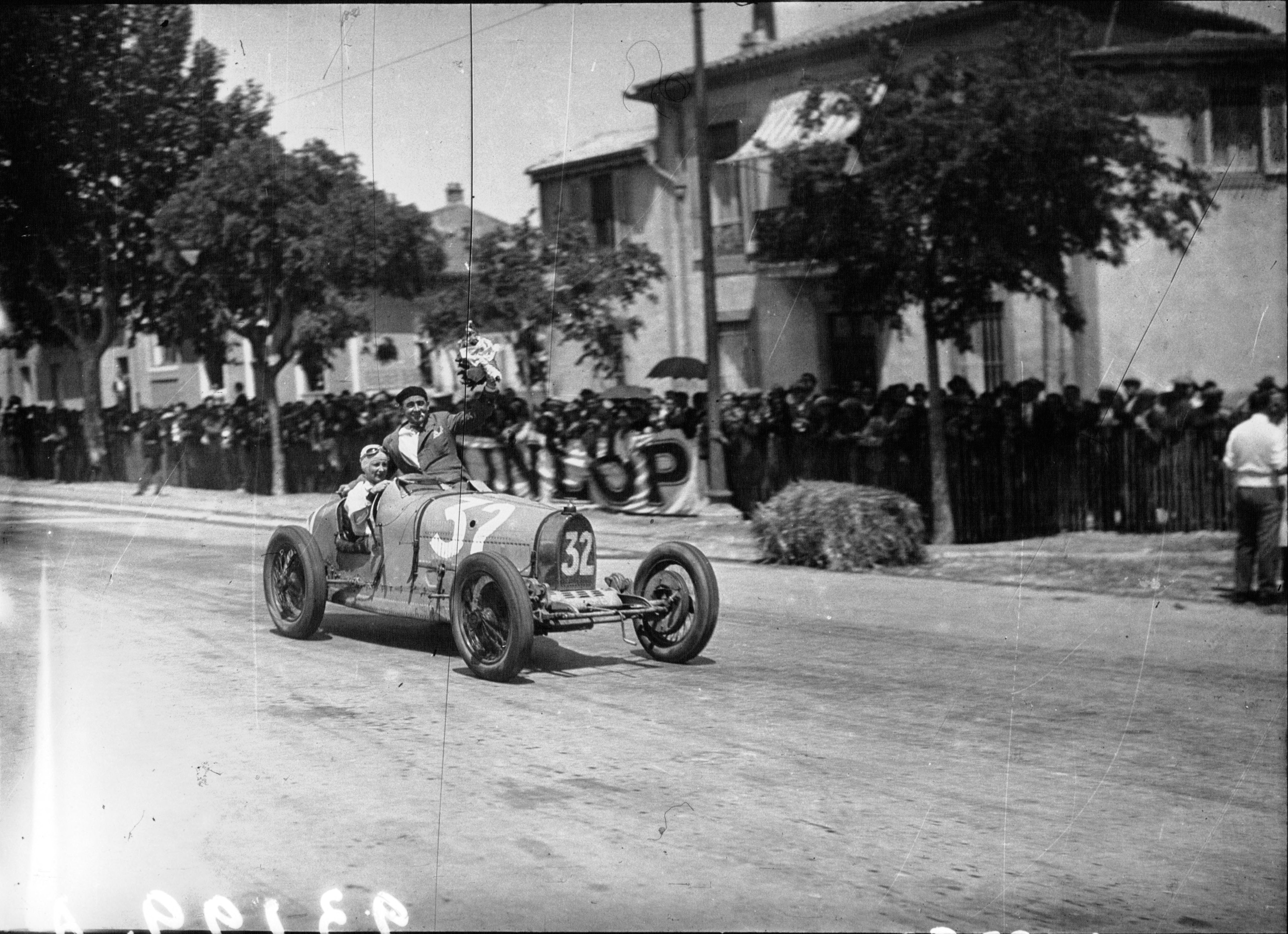
Itier at the 1932 Trophée de Provence

Anne-Cécile Rose-Itier (née Itier; 31 July 1890—23 March 1980) was a French multi-talented automobile driver and co-driver, competing in rallies, hill climbs, circuits, and endurance events.

== Personal life ==
Itier was born on 31 July 1890 in Pomeys, Rhône.

Having previously learned to fly, she began driving competitively at 31 after she left her abusive husband and began what would become a protracted divorce. Other drivers derisively labeled her a "mobile chicane", but she proved a determined competitor, finishing second in her class and sixth overall in the 1926 Paris—Pau road race. In 1930 her financial situation appears to have improved significantly, likely indicating that her divorce was finalized. At that time, she purchased an apartment in Jardin des Tuileries, a summer home in Capbreton, and a supercharged Bugatti Type 37.

During the Second World War, Itier helped to evacuate children out of occupied France.

She retired from racing at 58 and operated a tea shop in Capbreton, near her country home. Itier died on 23 March 1980 in Cannes.

== Career ==
Her long competitive career, which started with the 1926 Paris—Pau race (in a Brasier), continued more than a quarter century, to the 1953 Monte Carlo Rally.

She frequently raced in the Cyclecar category from 1929. From 1931 to 1933, she drove a Bugatti Type 37, then a Type 51 (after a brief stint on a Type 39A, associated with José Scaron) from 1934, alternating with a Fiat 508S Balilla from 1935.

She was also co-driver with the English driver Kay Petre in an Austin and very often with the German Fritz Huschke von Hanstein in a Hanomag Diesel (1939 German touring car champion and winner of the 1940 Mille Miglia), with whom she even had an affair, after the latter had saved her from death during the Morocco rally of 1937. She was at his side for his last race before the war: the 1939 Monte Carlo Rally.

In 1935, with Jacques Delorme, Germaine Rouault and Hellé Nice, she founded the U.S.A. (Union sportive automobile), which soon became the A.C.I. (Association pour les conduites indépendants), which she continued to administer until the mid-1960s, under the aegis of the French Federation of Automobile Sport (FFSA).

Itier was thus entrusted with the organization of the U.S.A. 1939 Women's Championship: ten competitors driving Renault Juvaquatres. Despite the imminent threat of war, the championship saw two races: June 11 in Péronne (won by Yvonne Simon) and August 6 at the Circuit automobile du Comminges (won by Hellé Nice).

After the war, she raced again in her old Fiat Balilla, then quickly on a Renault 4CV and took part in the 1948–1953 Monte Carlo Rallies with co-driver and former dancer, Hellé Nice.

== Record ==
=== Rallying ===
- 2nd place: Monthléry women's rally in 1928
- Seven participations in the Monte Carlo Rally, in 1939 then from 1948 to 1953

=== Carting ===
- Cart race at the Nîmes circuit in 1932 (Trophée de Provence);
- Cart race at the Péronne circuit in 1933

=== Hill climbing ===
- 1928 and 1932: coast of La Mothe-Saint-Héraye
- 1933 and 1934: Côte de Phare (Biarritz).

=== Circuit racing ===
==== Grand Prix ====
Unless otherwise stated, Anne-Cécile Itier was committed to Bugatti.

- GP of Picardy in Péronne in 1933 (F2 – 1500cc) on Bugatti T51A
- GP of Provence in 1933 (cart category)
- Ladies' Cup of the GP of Picardy in 1939 (less than 1500cc)
  - 2nd in touring class of the GP de la Marne in 1935 (Fiat Balilla)
  - 3rd of the Oranie GP in 1930, cyclecar category on Rally (6th overall)
  - 3rd of the GP de la Marne in 1931, cart category (11th overall)
  - 3rd of the Picardie GP in 1934 on Bugatti T51 A
  - 3rd of the GP des Frontières in 1935 and 1936
  - 4th of the Circuit du Dauphiné GP in 1931
  - 4th of the Casablanca GP in 1932
  - 4th of the Albi GP in 1933
  - 5th of the Bordeaux GP in 1929
  - 5th of the Tunisian GP in 1932
  - 5th of the Lembourg GP in 1933 (Poland)
  - 6th of the Vichy GP in 1934

==== Endurance ====
Five appearances in the 24 Hours of Le Mans, from 1934 to 1939:

- 1934: 17th with Charles Duruy on Midget PA, 4-cylinder 0.8L in-line engine
- 1935: 18th with Robert Jacob on Fiat 508S Balilla Sport, 4-cylinder 1L in-line
- 1937: retirement with Fritz Huschke von Hanstein on Adler Trumpf Rennlimousine GT (first completely closed racing car at the time), due to engine failure
- 1938: 12th with the Claude Bonneau on Midget PA, 4-cylinder 1L in-line
- 1939: crashed with Suzanne Largeot on Simca 8, 4-cylinder 1.1L in-line

She finished third in the 12 Hours of Paris with Germaine Rouault, in 1938 aboard a Delahaye 135 CS, personal car.
