= 1950 24 Hours of Le Mans =

18th 24 Hours of Le Mans endurance race

Previous: 1949	Next: 1951
Index: Races | Winners

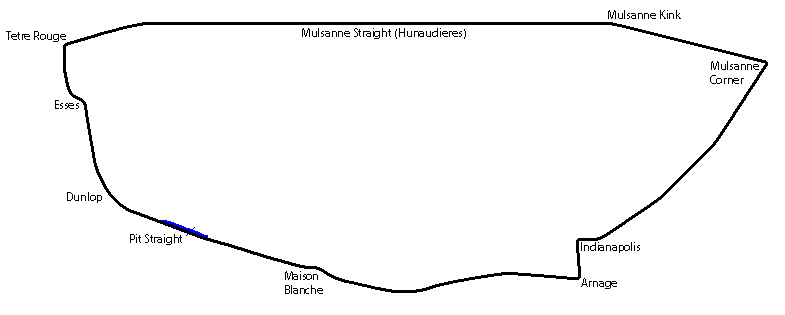
Le Mans in 1950

The 1950 24 Hours of Le Mans was a motor race for sports cars, staged at the Circuit de la Sarthe, Le Mans, France on 24 and 25 June 1950. It was the 18th Grand Prix of Endurance. The race was won by the French father-and-son pairing of Louis and Jean-Louis Rosier driving a privately entered Talbot-Lago.

== Regulations ==
The revival of motor-racing post-war was now in full swing – the FIA had published its new rules for single-seater racing and inaugurated the new World Championship of Drivers. Its Appendix C addressed two-seater sportscar racing, giving some definition for racing prototypes. The same categories (based on engine capacity) were kept, although the Automobile Club de l'Ouest (ACO) added an extra class at the top end – for over 5.0L up to 8.0L.

After last year's issues with the hybrid ‘ternary’ fuel, the ACO now supplied 80-octane gasoline as standard, thereby removing the need. The track was widened except for the run from Mulsanne to Indianapolis, and the re-surfacing completed, thus promising to give faster times and be a quicker race. Finally, the iconic Dunlop bridge was rebuilt – a footbridge over the circuit just after the first corner.

== Entries ==
A record 112 entries were received by the ACO, and they accepted 60 for the start – another record. This year there were 24 entries in the S3000, S5000 and S8000 classes. The biggest car this year carrying the #1, was a Manufacture d'armes de Paris MAP Diesel that was the first car to race at Le Mans with a mid-mounted engine (a supercharged 4.9L engine), with veteran racer and 1939 winner Pierre Veyron.

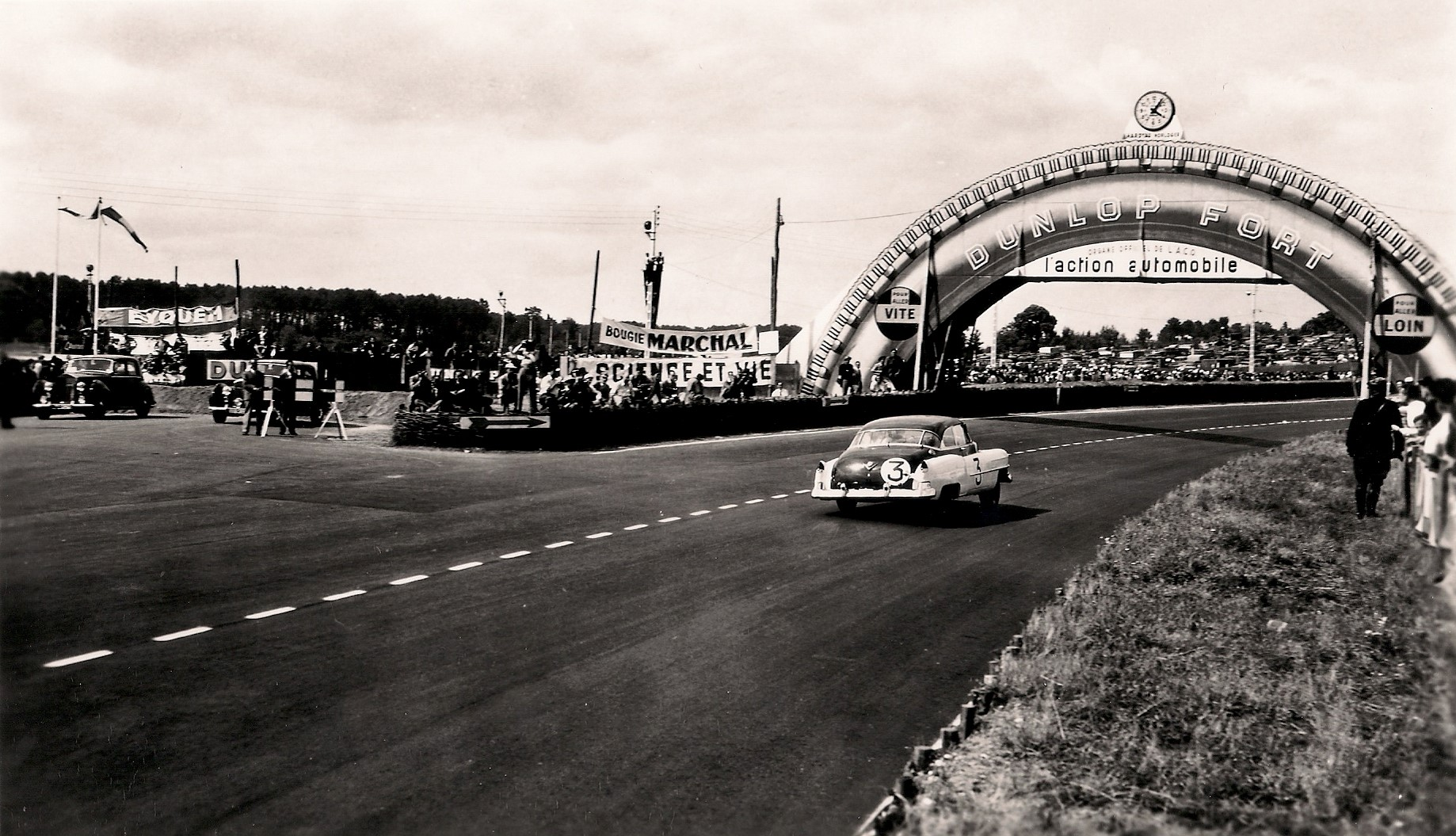
Cunningham's Cadillac Series 61 "Petit Pataud" passing under the Dunlop Bridge during the race.

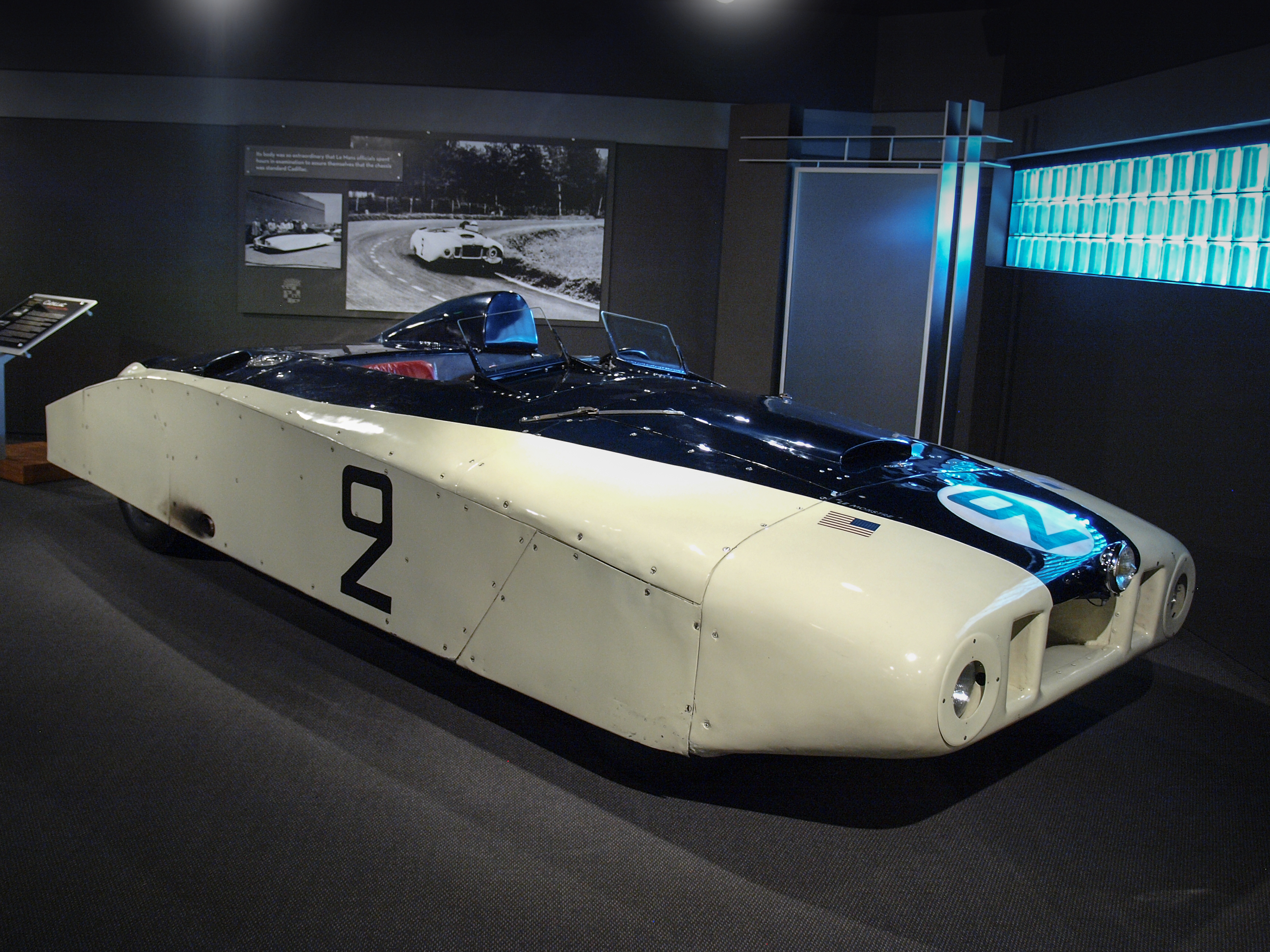
Cunningham's Cadillac Series 61 "Le Monstre"

The first Americans to race at Le Mans in 21 years arrived - Briggs Cunningham bought across two 5.4L Cadillacs, one a standard Series 61 sedan and the other with an ugly aerodynamic bodyshell refined in the Grumman Aircraft wind tunnel. They were soon nicknamed ‘’Petit Petaud (Small puppy)’’ and ‘’Le Monstre’’ respectively by the French, but Briggs saw the joke and had the names written on the bonnets beside the American flags. Both were fitted with pit-to-car radios.

But this year, the big news was the first appearance of Jaguar – with three new 3.4L XK120s. Factory-prepared, they were released to select private entrants to test the waters. Other British entries included an Allard with the big 5.4L Cadillac engine, co-driven by Sydney Allard himself; the Bentley saloon from last year returned, along with a second, even older (1934), car to represent the marque. This year Aston Martin came with three 2.6L DB2 works entries (now being run by John Wyer).

After their spectacular success last year, Ferrari arrived with three 166 MM cars, as well as a new model: a pair of 195 S cars, with a bigger 2.4L V12, entered by last year's winner Luigi Chinetti. This year Chinetti drove with Dreyfus, and was able to convince the great French driver Raymond Sommer (with whom he had won in 1932) to postpone his retirement to drive his other car.

The French defended their home turf with a pair of fast privately entered Talbot-Lago T26 (based on the current Grand Prix car) and the urbane SS coupe. Too heavy to be competitive in the new World Championship, their speed and durability made them ideal for Le Mans. Charles Pozzi returned with two Delahaye 175 S in his new Ecurie Lutetia team, the Delettrez brothers had their diesel special back, and two old Delage D6s returned (for the last time) including that of Henri Louveau who had staged such a spirited chase the year before. Also, with better preparation time, Amédée Gordini entered a big team of his new T15 cars, including two fitted with superchargers to take on the Ferraris. His regular Grand Prix drivers, Maurice Trintignant and Robert Manzon drove one and two new Argentinians Juan-Manuel Fangio and José Froilán González (both competing in F1 this year) the other – all Le Mans debutants along with Jean Behra in a 1500 Gordini.

In the mid-size S2000 and S1500 classes, aside from the Ferraris and the two mid-size Gordinis, was an assortment of makes including Frazer-Nash, Jowett, Peugeot, Fiat and MG. If the French were under-represented in the big classes, they made up for it in the S1100 and S750 small-car categories, with 20 of the 25 entries, including works entries from Gordini, Monopole, Panhard, DB, Renault and Simca. Czechoslovakia was represented by two manufacturers: Aero-Minor, back from the 1949 race, and Škoda, all in the S1100 class.

== Practice ==
In practice, Raymond Sommer showed that the new Ferraris were fastest, with a five-minute lap exactly – ahead of the Talbot-Lagos. Auguste Veuillet crashed and rolled his Delahaye, but after overnight repairs, it was ready for the race the next day, only for the car to refuse to start with a flat battery.

== Race ==
=== Start ===
Lined up, as was Le Mans tradition, according to effective engine capacity, it was Tom Cole in the Allard who was the first to get going. Last to get away was Fangio's Gordini with an engine misfire. Sommer overtook a dozen cars to lead at the end of the first lap, ahead of Cole, Meyrat's Talbot, Peter Whitehead in the new Jaguar and Trintignant in the supercharged Gordini. On lap 2 Cunningham slid “Le Monstre” into the Mulsanne sandbank and had to spend 15 minutes digging it out By the fifth lap, Rosier had his Talbot up to third and Chinetti had the other big Ferrari up to fifth.

It stayed pretty much like that for the first few hours with Sommer putting in some very fast laps, averaging just under 99 mph to extend his lead. But then the pressure of that pace told and he lost a cylinder and had to pit with electrical problems from a dislodged alternator, dropping him to fifth. That let Rosier into the lead in the 3rd hour, and he then put in some blistering laps to break up the pursuing pack. As the sun set and in the cooler air he broke Sommer's new lap record by almost ten secords with Le Mans’ first race lap averaging over 100 mph (160 km/h). At the end of four hours, it was Rosier, Chinetti, Sommer, Meyrat - Talbot, Ferrari, Ferrari, Talbot - then the Allard and the first Jaguar.

=== Night ===
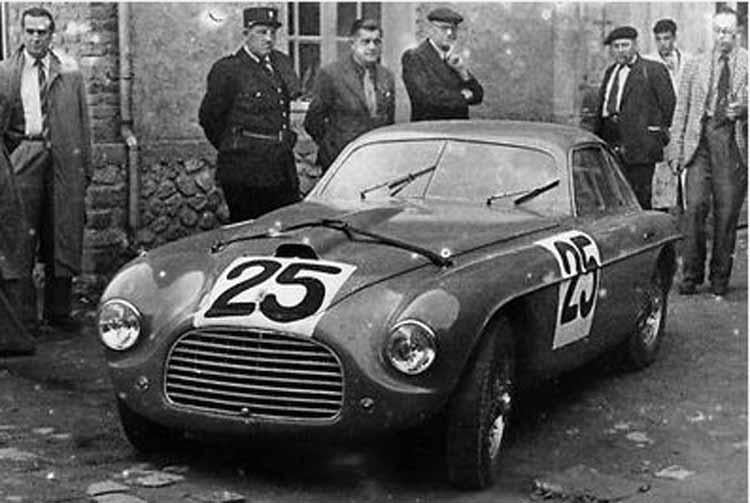
The Ferrari 195 S of Sommer and Serafini, which led early on but retired due to electrical issues

Going into the night, Sommer/Serafini's ongoing electrical problems continued to plague them, taking them out of the running then finally leading to retirement after midnight – with no lights! Further excitement in the night happened when the Pozzi Delahaye had an engine-fire while refuelling, right in front of the second-placed Mairesse Talbot in at the same time. But once the flames were out, Flahault jumped in and drove out without even checking for damage

Early on Sunday morning while running second, the Allard's 3-speed gearbox lost its two lowest gears. It could not be repaired, so the mechanics jammed it into 3rd and sent it back out again, having dropped down to 8th. Around a similar time the differential on Chinetti's Ferrari started playing up, after also running in the top 3 for first half of the race; they eventually retired mid-morning.

At the halfway point after 12 hours, it was the two Talbots of Rosier and Meyrat/Mairesse (six laps apart), then a lap back to the Johnson/Hadley Jaguar, the Rolt/Hamilton Nash-Healey and the struggling Allard.

=== Morning ===
At 5am the leader came into the pits with a 7-lap lead, and Rosier personally replaced the rocker-shaft. His son then took the car out for just 2 laps while Louis cleaned up and ate some bananas. Then Rosier Sr got back in, resuming in 3rd, and drove on for the rest of the race. With Rosier in the pits, the second Talbot took the lead and held it for three hours, with the Jaguar of Johnson/Hadley in second. But Rosier was a man on a mission and before 9am, he had overtaken both and was back in the lead. He had to pit later in the morning when he struck an owl, smashing the (tiny) windscreen and giving him a black eye.

At 8am Jean Lucas, running sixth, crashed and rolled Lord Selsdon’s Ferrari, getting minor injuries and taking the last of the prancing horses out of the race. The Anglo-American Nash-Healey prototype of Rolt/Hamilton had been in the top-5 since halfway and was 3rd when it was punted off the track by Louveau's Delage. The 45 minutes spent on repairs dropped it a position. Pozzi's Delahaye had run as high was 5th through the night, but then the fire and subsequent overheating dropped it down. Late in the morning at a pit-stop, pent-up pressure blew off the radiator cap, which the officious stewards deemed an illegal breakage of the security seals and controversially disqualified him.

By midday the old order was restored: the two Talbots, now only a lap apart, three laps back to the Jaguar and a further lap to the Nash-Healey. Rosier eased off, conserving his car, but keeping a solid lead. Then the Jaguar of Johnson/Hadley had to retire with less than 3 hours to go when the clutch finally let go, after the drivers had had to use engine-breaking because of a lack of brakes. But it was Tim Cole who was lapping fastest of all in fourth, even though he still only had top gear, and caught Rolt (having to driver carefully with a dodgy rear axle and fading brakes) with 30 minutes to go.

=== Finish and post-race ===
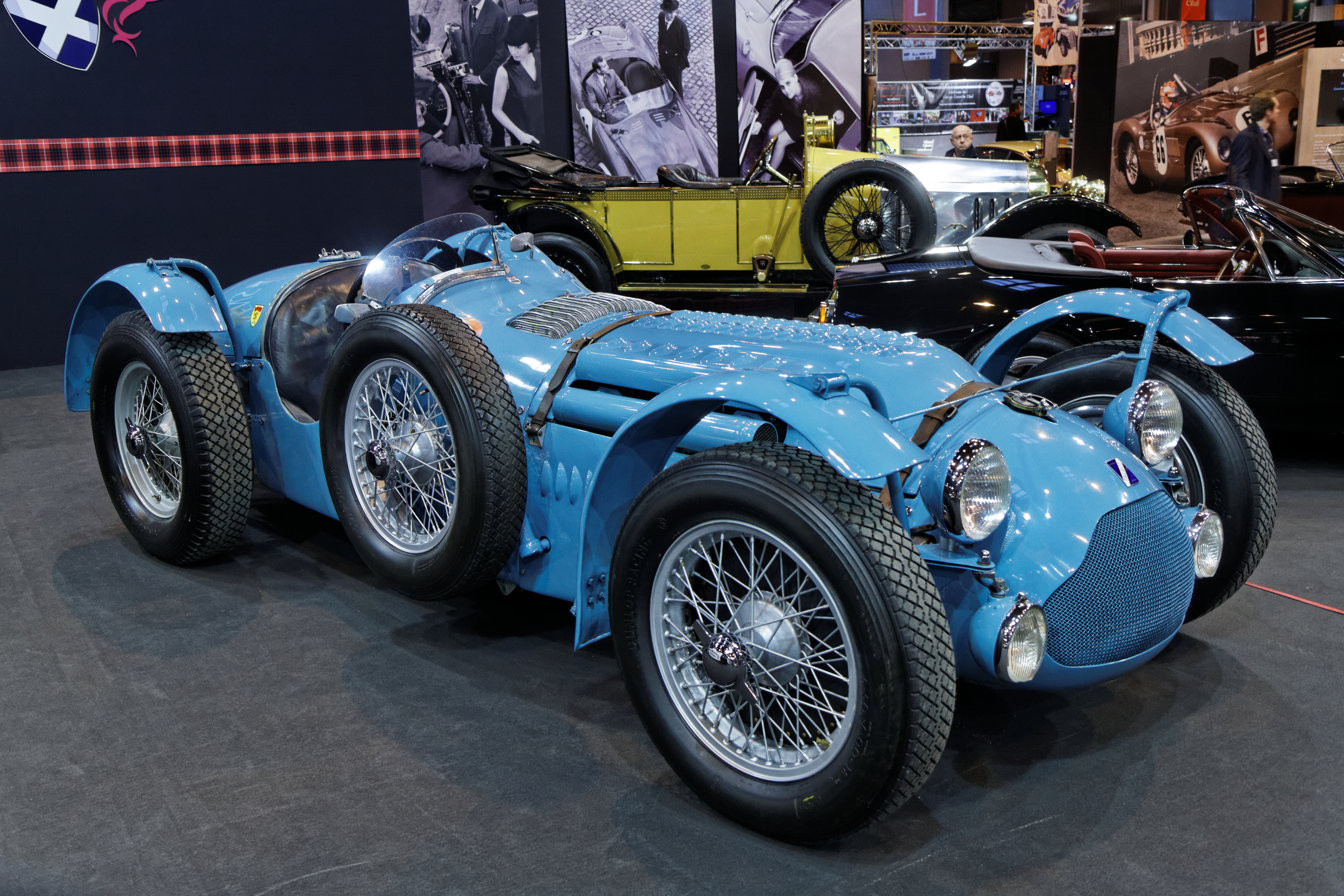
The winning Talbot-Lago T26 GS

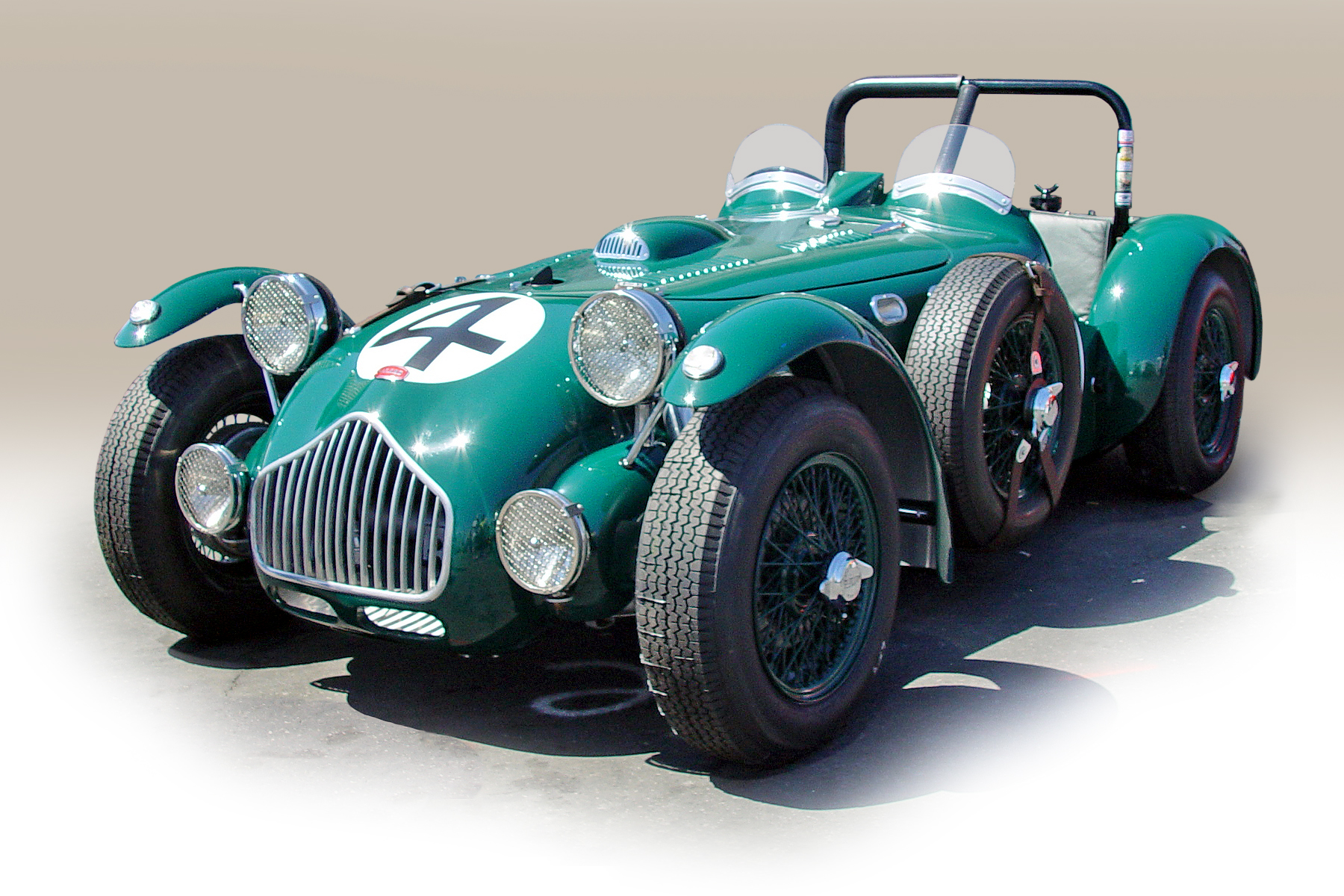
The third placed Allard J2, pictured in 2006

In the end, Louis Rosier cruised to the win, and with Guy Mairesse and Pierre Meyrat, gave one of Talbot-Lago's greatest days – coming 1st & 2nd (in fact, all 3 cars finished - the sedan was 13th), and a record distance covered All the first five finishers beat the 1939 distance record. 14 of 16 British cars that entered finished, taking the 8.0L, 3.0L, 2.0L and 1.5L class wins. The Allard finished third, the Nash-Healey was fourth ahead of two of John Wyer’s Aston Martins that had run like clockwork. They were comfortably ahead of Louveau's Delage in seventh, that had finished 2nd the year before but this year never had the pace, despite running trouble-free. The new Frazer-Nash (driven by ex-fighter pilot Dickie Stoop) took the S2000 class and the lightened works Jowett Javelin roadster easily won the S1500 class by 12 laps, driven by the coincidentally-named Wise and Wisdom.

By contrast all five Ferraris retired, as did all nine Simca-engined cars, including the six works Gordinis. Both the Bentleys finished – though Louis Rosier did a herculean job driving for all but 2 laps, Eddie Hall in the TT finished 8th and became the only driver to finish a Le Mans going solo the whole distance (just over 3200km). Likewise both Cadillacs finished (10th & 11th – positions they had held virtually the whole race) even though ‘’Le Monstre’’, like the Allard, had been stuck in top gear for most of the race The little Czech Aero repeated its win from 1949 in the smallest (S750) class, beating the French contingent it went up against.

The Abecassis/Macklin Aston Martin had taken the lead in the Index of Performance in the morning, but a strong drive in their little Monopole-Panhard #52 (611cc, 36bhp) by company owners Pierre Hérnard & Jean de Montrémy meant they exceeded their designated distance by exactly the same margin thereby sharing the Index victory.

The Jaguar management were satisfied with the performance of their cars – two finished, and the other had run as high as second before retiring, but resolved to fix the brake problems that had troubled all three cars through the race

The French racer, Raymond Sommer was killed later in the year, at a Formula 2 race at Cadours.

== Official results ==
Pos	Class	No	Team	Drivers	Chassis	Engine	Laps
1	S 5.0	5	(France) Louis Rosier (private entrant)	(France) Louis Rosier (France) Jean-Louis Rosier	Talbot-Lago T26 GS Biplace	Talbot-Lago 4.5L S6	256
2	S 5.0	7	(France) Pierre Meyrat (private entrant)	(France) Pierre Meyrat (France) Guy Mairesse	Talbot-Lago T26; Monoplace Decalee	Talbot-Lago 4.5L S6	255
3	S 8.0	4	(United Kingdom) S.H. Allard	(United Kingdom) Sydney Allard (United States) Tom Cole Jr.	Allard J2	Cadillac 5.4L V8	251
4	S 5.0	14	(United Kingdom) Healey Motors Ltd.	(United Kingdom) Tony Rolt (United Kingdom) Duncan Hamilton	Nash-Healey E	Nash 3.8L S6	250
5	S 3.0	19	(United Kingdom) Aston Martin Ltd.	(United Kingdom) George Abecassis (United Kingdom) Lance Macklin	Aston Martin DB2	Aston Martin 2.6L S6	249
6	S 3.0	21	(United Kingdom) Aston Martin Ltd.	(United Kingdom) Reg Parnell (United Kingdom) Charles Brackenbury	Aston Martin DB2	Aston Martin 2.6L S6	244
7	S 3.0	18	(France) Henri Louveau (private entrant)	(France) Henri Louveau (France) Jean Estager	Delage D6-3L	Delage 3.0L S6	241
8	S 5.0	11	(United Kingdom) E.R. Hall (private entrant)	(United Kingdom) Eddie Hall (United Kingdom) Tom Clarke	Bentley Corniche TT Coupé	Bentley 4.3L S6	236
9	S 2.0	30	(United Kingdom) H.J. Aldington (private entrant)	(United Kingdom) Richard "Dickie" Stoop (United Kingdom) T.A.S.O. "Donald" Mathieson	Frazer Nash Milla Miglia	Bristol 2.0L S6	235
10	S 8.0	3	(United States) Briggs Cunningham (private entrant)	(United States) Miles Collier (United States) Sam Collier	Cadillac Coupe de Ville	Cadillac 5.4L V8	233
11	S 8.0	2	(United States) Briggs Cunningham (private entrant)	(United States) Briggs Cunningham (United States) Phil Walters	Cadillac Spider	Cadillac 5.4L V8	232
12	S 5.0	15	(United Kingdom) P.T.C. Clark (private entrant)	(United Kingdom) Peter Clark (United Kingdom) Nick Haines	Jaguar XK120S	Jaguar 3.4L S6	230
13	S 5.0	6	(France) André Chambas (private entrant)	(France) André Chambas (France) André Morel	Talbot-Lago Gran Sport Coupe	Talbot-Lago 4.5L S6	228
14	S 5.0	12	(United Kingdom) H.S.F. Hay (private entrant)	(United Kingdom) Jack 'Zoltan' Hay (United Kingdom) Hugh Hunter	Bentley 4¼ Paulin	Bentley 4.3L S6	225
15	S 5.0	16	(United Kingdom) P.C.D. Walker (private entrant)	(United Kingdom) Peter Whitehead (United Kingdom) John Marshall	Jaguar XK120S	Jaguar 3.4L S6	225
16	S 1.5	36	(United Kingdom) Jowett Cars Ltd.	(United Kingdom) Tommy Wisdom (United Kingdom) Tommy Wise	Jowett Jupiter Javelin	Jowett 1486cc Flat-4	220
17	S 3.0	22	(United Kingdom) R. Lawrie (private entrant)	(United Kingdom) Rob Lawrie (United Kingdom) Geoffrey Beetson	Riley RMC	Riley 2.5L S4	213
18	S 1.5	39	(United Kingdom) G.E. Phillips (private entrant)	(United Kingdom) George Phillips (United Kingdom) Eric Winterbottom	MG TC Special	MG 1244cc S4	208
19	S 3.0	23	(United Kingdom) N.H. Mann (private entrant)	(United Kingdom) Nigel Mann (United Kingdom) Mortimer Morris-Goodall	Healey Elliott	Riley 2.4L S4	203
20	S 2.0	31	(United Kingdom) N.R. Culpan (private entrant)	(United Kingdom) Norman Culpan (United Kingdom) Lt. Cdr. Peter Wilson	Frazer Nash High Speed; Le Mans Replica	Bristol 2.0L S6	201
21	S 750	51	(Czechoslovakia) Rudý Letov Letnany	(Netherlands) Maurice Gatsonides (Netherlands) Henk Hoogeven	Aero Minor 750	Aero 744cc Flat-2 (2-Stroke)	184
22	S 750	52	(France) Établissements Monopole	(France) Jean de Montrémy (France) Jean Hémard	Monopole X84	Panhard 611cc Flat-2	180
23	S 750	58	(France) Automobiles Deutsch et Bonnet	(France) René Bonnet (France) Élie Bayol	DB Sport	Panhard 611cc Flat-2	175
24	S 1.1	46	(France) J.L.V. Sandt (private entrant)	(France) Jean Sandt (France) Hervé Coatalen	Renault 4CV	Renault 760cc S4	171
25	S 1.1	48	(France) L. Pons (private entrant)	(France) Jacques Lecat (France) Louis Pons	Renault 4CV	Renault 760cc S4	170
26	S 750	55	(France) A. Lachaize (private entrant)	(France) Auguste Lachaize (France) Albert Debille	Panhard Dyna X84 Sport	Panhard 611cc Flat-2	168
27	S 1.1	45	(France) J.-E. Vernet (private entrant)	(France) Just-Emile Vernet (France) Roger Eckerlein	Renault 4CV	Renault 760cc S4	158
28	S 750	56	(France) R. Gaillard (private entrant)	(France) Raymond Gaillard (France) Pierre Chancel	Callista RAN D120	Panhard 611cc Flat-2	153
29	S 750	57	(Belgium) L. Eggen (private entrant)	(Belgium) Louis Eggen (Belgium) "Escale"	Panhard Dyna X84	Panhard 611cc Flat-2	151

== Did Not Finish ==
Pos	Class	No	Team	Drivers	Chassis	Engine	Laps	Reason
30	S 5.0	17	(United Kingdom) L. Johnson (private entrant)	(United Kingdom) Leslie Johnson (United Kingdom) Bert Hadley	Jaguar XK120S	Jaguar 3.4L S6	220	Clutch
31	S 5.0	8	(France) Ecurie Lutetia	(France) Charles Pozzi (France) Pierre Flahaut	Delahaye 175S	Delahaye 4.5L S6	165	Disqualified; Water leak
32	S 2.0	28	(United Kingdom) Peter Mitchell-Thomson, Lord Selsdon (private entrant)	(United Kingdom) Peter Mitchell-Thomson, Lord Selsdon (France) Jean Lucas	Ferrari 166 MM Berlinetta LM	Ferrari 2.0L V12	164	Accident
33	S 1.1	43	(France) Automobiles Gordini	(France) Georges Blondel (France) Raoul Martin	Gordini T15S	Simca 1090cc S4	157	Engine
34	S 1.1	41	(France) Mmes Rouault et Gordine (private entrant)	(France) Germaine Rouault (France) Régine Gordine	Gordini T11 MM	Simca 1090cc S4	143	Accident
35	S 750	49	(France) J. Poch (private entrant)	(France) Jacques Poch (France) Edmond Mouche	Aero Minor	Aero 744cc Flat-2 (2-Stroke)	139	Wheel bearing
36	S 1.1	40	(France) N.-J. Mahé (private entrant)	(France) Norbert Jean Mahé (France) Sacha Gordine	Simca Huit	Simca 1090cc S4	126	Engine
37	S 3.0	24	(United States) Luigi Chinetti	(United States) Luigi Chinetti (France) Pierre-Louis Dreyfus ("Heldé")	Ferrari 195 S Barchetta	Ferrari 2.3L V12	121	Transmission
38	S 5.0	10	(France) Etablissements; Delettrez	(France) Jean Delettrez (France) Jacques Delettrez	Delettrez Diesel	Delettrez 4.4L S6 (Diesel)	120	Engine
39	S 1.1	44	(Czechoslovakia) A.Z.N.P.	(Czechoslovakia) Václav Bobek (Czechoslovakia) Jaroslav Netušil	Škoda 1101 Spyder	Škoda 1089cc S4	120	Engine
40	S 750	54	(France) G. Lapchin (private entrant)	(France) Guy Lapchin (France) Charles Plantivaux	Panhard Dyna X84 Sport	Panhard 611cc Flat-2	115	Electrics
41	S 3.0	33	(France) Automobiles Gordini	(Argentina) Juan Manuel Fangio (Argentina) José Froilán González	Gordini T15S Coupé	Simca 1491cc supercharged S4	95	Engine
42	S 1.1	47	(France) Ets. Savin & Leroy (private entrant)	(France) Fernand Leroy (France) Marcel Joseph	Renault 4CV	Renault 760cc S4	92	Accident
43	S 750	53	(France) J. Savoye (private entrant)	(France) Jacques Savoye (France) Eugène Dussous	Monopole X84	Panhard 611cc Flat-2	89	Oil leak
44	S 750	50	(France) Sté. Pierre Ferry (private entrant)	(France) Pierre Ferry (France) André-Georges Claude	Ferry Sport	Renault 747cc S4	86	Engine
45	S 3.0	25	(United States) Luigi Chinetti	(France) Raymond Sommer (Italy) Dorino Serafini	Ferrari 195 S Berlinetta	Ferrari 2.3L V12	82	Electrics
46	S 1.1	42	(France) Automobiles Gordini	(France) José Scaron (France) Robert Pascal	Gordini T15S	Simca 1090cc S4	77	Oil pump
47	S 1.5	37	(France) J. Brault (private entrant)	(France) Jean Brault (France) Louis Paimpol	Fiat 1500 Spéciale	Fiat 1.5L S4	75	Gearbox
48	S 1.5	35	(France) Automobiles Gordini	(France) Roger Loyer (France) Jean Behra	Gordini T15S	Simca 1491cc S4	50	Engine
49	S 2.0	64	(France) Automobiles Deutsch et Bonnet	(France) René Simone (France) Michel Arnaud	DB 5	Citroën 1.9L S4	44	Engine
50	S 2.0	26	(United States) P.Rubirosa (private entrant)	(Dominican Republic) Porfirio Rubirosa (France) Pierre Leygonie	Ferrari 166 MM	Ferrari 2.0L V12	44	Clutch
51	S 5.0	1	(France) Manufactures d'Armes de Paris	(France) Pierre Veyron (France) Fernand Lacour	M.A.P. Diesel	M.A.P. 5.0L supercharged Flat-4 (Diesel)	39	Overheating
52	S 3.0	32	(France) Automobiles Gordini	(France) Maurice Trintignant (France) Robert Manzon	Gordini T15S Coupé	Simca 1491cc supercharged S4	34	Water radiator
53	S 1.1	63	(France) M. Gendron (private entrant)	(France) Marcel Gendron (France) Jean Vinatier	Renault 4CV	Renault 760cc S4	32	Electrics
54	S 2.0	27	(United States) Mme Y. Simon (private entrant)	(France) Yvonne Simon (France) Michel Kasse	Ferrari 166 MM Coupé	Ferrari 2.0L V12	25	Out of fuel
55	S 750	60	(France) Ecurie Verte	(France) Emmanuel Baboin (France) Pierre Gay	Simca Six Spéciale	Simca 580cc S4	20	Out of fuel
56	S 1.5	34	(France) Automobiles Gordini	(France) André Simon (France) Aldo Gordini	Gordini T15S	Simca 1491cc S4	14	Gearbox
57	S 1.1	66	(France) A. Guillard (private entrant)	(France) André Guillard (Switzerland) Roger Carron	Simca Huit Spéciale	Simca 1087cc S4	13	Engine
58	S 3.0	20	(United Kingdom) Aston Martin Ltd.	(United Kingdom) Eric Thompson (United States) John Gordon	Aston Martin DB2	Aston Martin 2.6L S6	8	Engine
59	S 750	59	(France) Automobiles Deutsch et Bonnet	(France) Georges Guyot (France) Pierre Chaussat	DB Sport	Panhard 611cc Flat-2	6	Accident
60	S 5.0	9	(France) Ecurie Lutetia	(France) Gaston Serraud (France) André de Guelfi	Delahaye 175S	Delahaye 4.5L S6	0	Battery

== 16th Rudge-Whitworth Biennial Cup (1949/1950) ==
Pos	Class	No	Team	Drivers	Chassis	Score
1	S 750	52	(France) Établissements Monopole	(France) Jean de Montrémy (France) Jean Hémard	Monopole X84	1.276
2	S 2.0	30	(United Kingdom) H.J. Aldington (private entrant)	(United Kingdom) Richard Stoop (United Kingdom) T.A.S.O. "Donald" Mathieson	Frazer Nash Milla Miglia	1.246
3	S 750	51	(Czechoslovakia) Rudý Letov Letnany	(Netherlands) Maurice Gatsonides (Netherlands) Henk Hoogeven	Aero Minor 750	1.221
4	S 750	55	(France) A. Lachaize (private entrant)	(France) Auguste Lachaize (France) Albert Debille	Panhard Dyna X84 Sport	1.195

== Statistics ==
- Fastest Lap in practice – Raymond Sommer, #25 Ferrari 195 S – 5:00, 161.90 km/h (100.60 mph)
- Fastest Lap – Louis Rosier #5 Talbot-Lago T26C GS Biplace – 4:53.5, 165.49 km/h (102.83 mph)
- Winning Distance – 3465.12 km (2153.12 miles)
- Winner's Average Speed – 144.38 km/h (89.72 mph)

== Trophy winners ==
- 16th Rudge-Whitworth Biennial Cup – #52 Pierre Hérnard / Jean de Montrémy
- Index of Performance – #19 Abecassis / Macklin & #52 Hérnard / de Montrémy (tied)
