= Rallye Paris – Saint-Raphaël Féminin =

French road rally event for female competitors

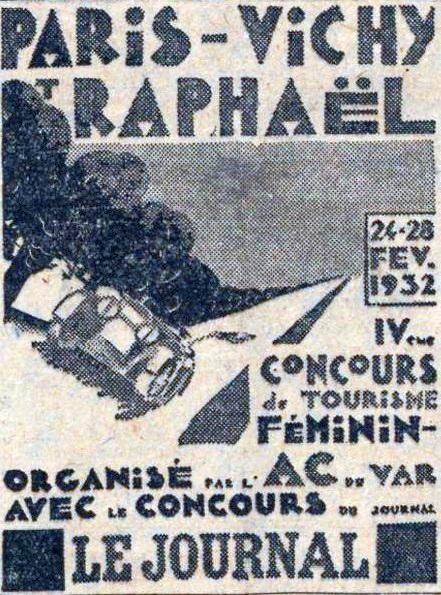

Poster for the 1932 Rallye Paris – Saint-Raphaël Féminin.
- First race: 20–24 February 1929
- Last race: 1974
- Distance: Varies
- Most wins (driver): Claudine Vanson/Claudine Trautmann

Circuit information
- Surface: Road

The Rallye Paris – Saint-Raphaël Féminin was a car rally in France exclusively for female participants. It was held over a 45-year period beginning in 1929 with a hiatus during World War II. The race was typically scheduled for the end of February to the beginning of March (later June) for 4 or 5 days, with the drivers covering a total distance of between 1,100 and 2,500 km (684 and 1,553 mi), depending on the year.

== History ==
In 1929, Count Edmé de Rohan-Chabot (28 December 1904 – 5 October 1972, Chevalier of the Legion of Honor) created this race. Racers at its first running included the Countess de Lesguern and the Baroness d'Elern.

While there had been other such races, including the Rallye Paris–La Baule pour dames and the Championnat féminin de l’Auto sponsored by the Automobile Club féminin de France established by the Duchesse d'Uzès in 1926, these eventually ended, leaving the Rallye Paris – Saint-Raphaël the world's only major automobile race reserved for women during the middle part of the 20th century.

The rally consisted of special performance tests, pure navigation sections, and driving tests, with end-points in the cities of Paris and Saint-Raphaël.

The inaugural rally, held 20–24 February 1929, followed a route that went Paris–Vichy–Lyon–Avignon–Miramas–La Ciotat–Hyères–St-Raphaël, covering a distance of 1,087 km (675.4 mi). The race was won by Madame Liétard in a Salmson AL7 GS.

The second rally of 19 February 1930 went Paris–Vichy–Hyères–St-Raphaël, and covered 1,130 km (702.1 mi). By this time the race had already acquired a certain fame. Maurice Philippe became director of the event during the 1930s.

In 1932, Frenchwoman Renée Friderich, daughter of driver Ernest Friderich, died in an accident with her Delage D8. There were two further deaths in the event's history - Cathy Pitt, who was killed in 1969 in a head-on collision on a road section, and Marguerite Accarie who died during the 1970 event during the final special stage.

Englishwoman Betty Haig, grand-niece of Marshal Douglas Haig, won the race in 1938. Two years earlier, as the only female competitor, she won the 1936 Olympic Rally in a Singer Le Mans 1500 in the only road-going motorized Olympic demonstration event (powerboating appearing in 1908) ever accepted by the IOC. In 1946 she also won the first Coupe des Dames awarded in the post-war period at the revived Coupe des Alpes rally.

In 1972 Count de Rohan-Chabot died, marking the beginning of the decline of the race. Points earned in the 1973 season, still exclusively for female drivers, were counted towards the European Rally Championship (ERC). In 1974 Belgian Christine Beckers won the last Paris – Saint-Raphaël of its 45-year history at the wheel of a Lancia Stratos. This final event was also recognized by the ERC. It also marked the first appearance of Michèle Mouton in a national competition as a driver.

A spiritual successor to the Rallye Paris – Saint-Raphaël Féminin appeared 26 years later with the first running of the Rallye des Princesses in the year 2000.

== Winners ==
List of Rally winners
Year	Driver	Car
1929	Madame Liétard	Salmson AL7 GS
1930	Madame Liétard	Salmson S4
1931	Renée Friderich or Lucienne Radisse	Bugatti Type 43 Grand Sport or Renault
1932	Hellé Nice	Bugatti Type 35B (supercharged)
1933	Marcelle Leblanc	Peugeot 301
1934	Madame Nenot^{1}	Delahaye 138
1935	Olga Thibault	Peugeot 201 1084
1936	Germaine Rouault	Delahaye Sport 3227
1937	Germaine Rouault	Delahaye Sport 3227
1938	Betty Haig	MG PB
1939	Yvonne Simon	Hotchkiss Grand Sport
1951^{2}	Lucienne Alziary de Roquefort	Panhard Dyna X
1952	Yvonne Simon	Renault 4CV 1063
1953	Yvonne Simon	Renault 4CV 1063
1954	Yvonne Simon	Panhard Monopole 750
1955	Marie-Antoinette Chauvin	Renault 4CV 1063
1959	Annie Soisbault	Triumph TR3
1961	Gabrielle "Gabi" Renault	Renault Dauphine Gordini
1963	Lucette Pointet	Citroën DS 19
1964	Claudine Vanson	Lancia Flavia Coupé
1966	Claudine Trautmann	Lancia Flavia Zagato
1967	Dominique Jullien (co-driver "Biche")	Porsche 911
1968	Claudine Trautmann	Lancia Fulvia Coupé Rallye HF
1969	Claudine Trautmann (co-driver Marianne Hoepfner)	Lancia Fulvia Coupé Rallye HF
1970	Marie-Pierre Palayer	Porsche 911
1972	Marianne Hoepfner	Alpine-Renault A110 1600S
1973	Marianne Hoepfner	Alpine-Renault A110 1600S
1974	Christine Beckers (co-driver "Biche")	Lancia Stratos HF
Note:^{1}Winner of the highest class; Madame Dubuc-Taine won the performance test, all classes combined, in a Hotchkiss.^{2}During the 1950s the difference between a "Professional" and "Amateur" was in dispute.

== Driver gallery ==
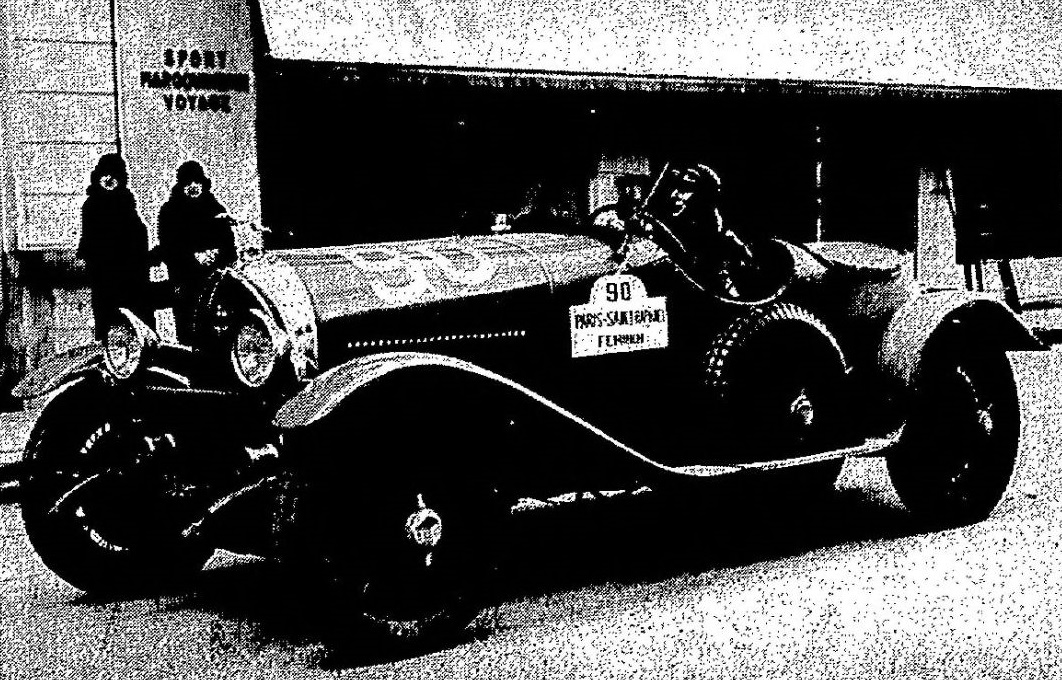
Madame Marie Schwartz, class winner in 1931, with Lorraine 15CV Sport.

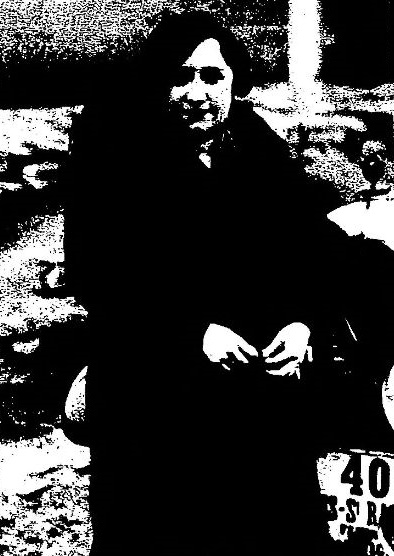
Madame Liétard during the 1932 rally.

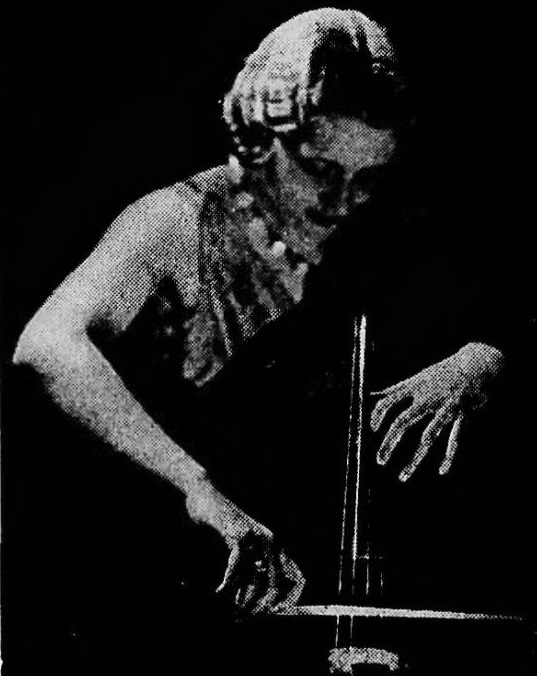
Lucienne Radisse (1932)

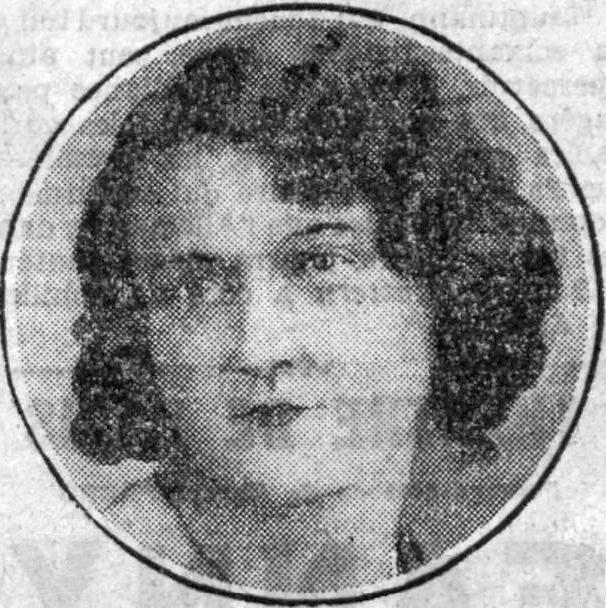
Olga Thibault (1932)

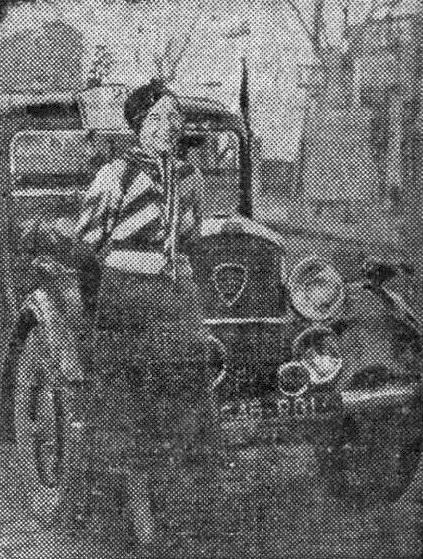
Marcelle Leblanc, winner in 1933

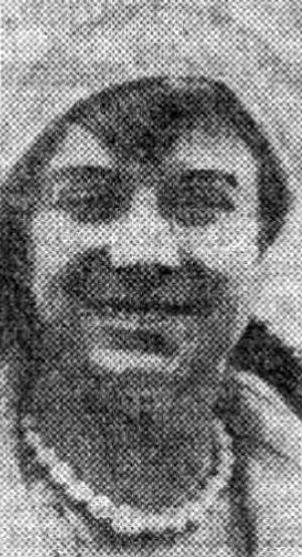
Marcelle Leblanc (1933)

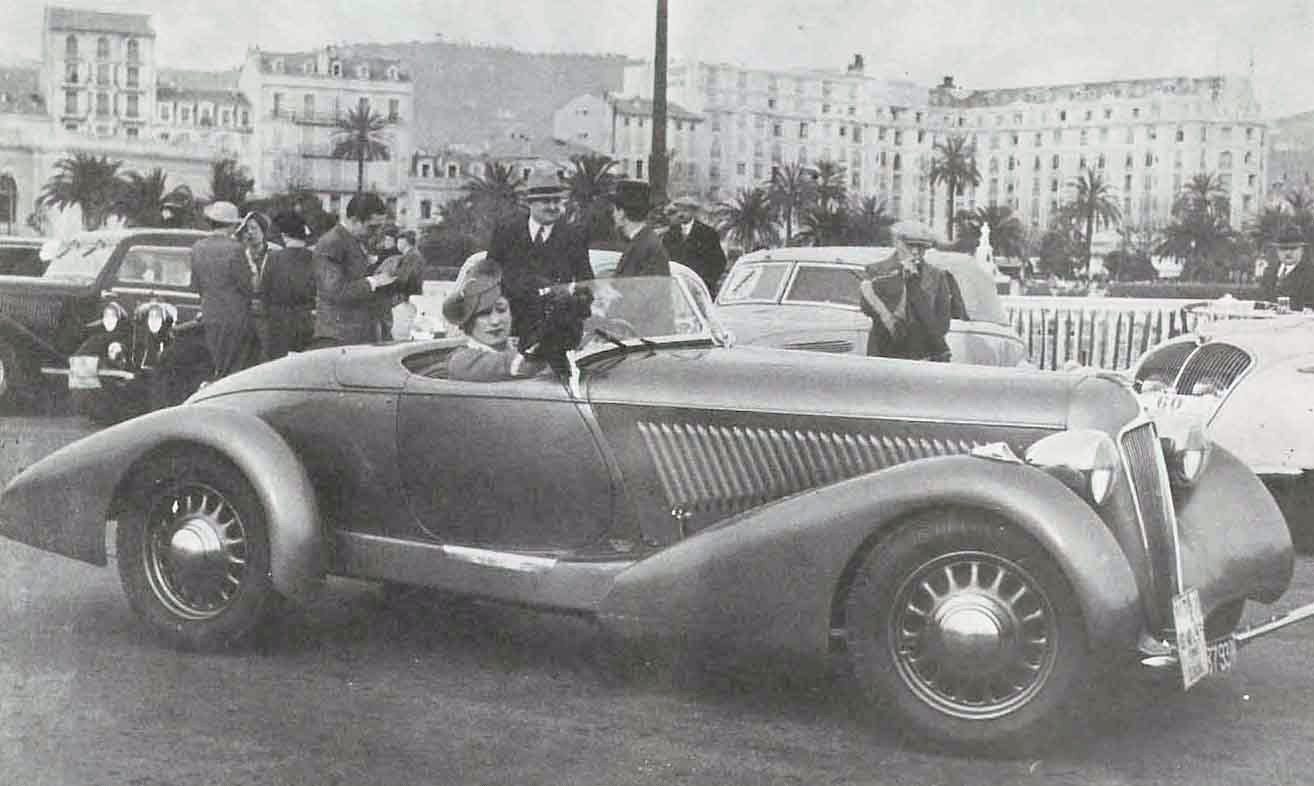
Madame Roux in 1934, in an Amilcar racer.

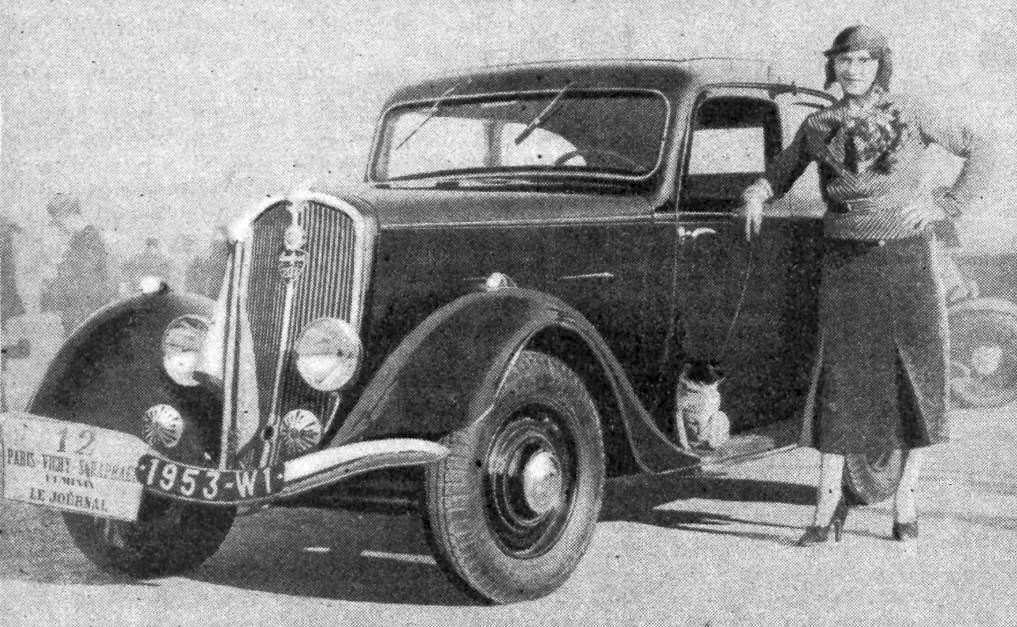
Olga Thibault, 1935 winner in a Peugeot 201.

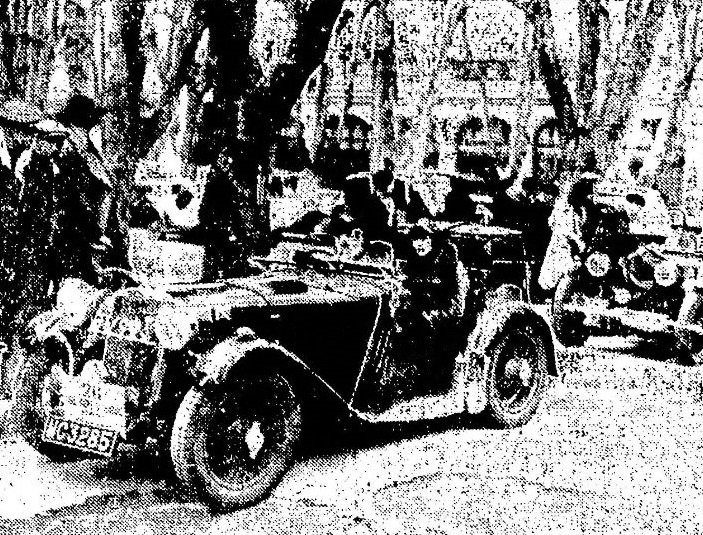
Betty Haig, during the 1935 race.

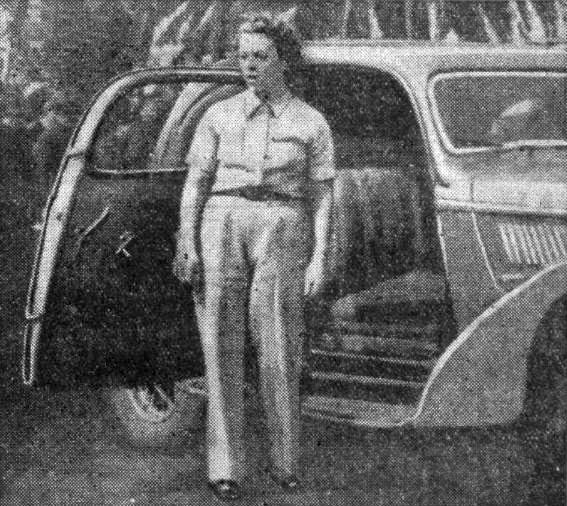
Yvonne Simon at Saint-Raphaël in 1939.

== Race gallery ==
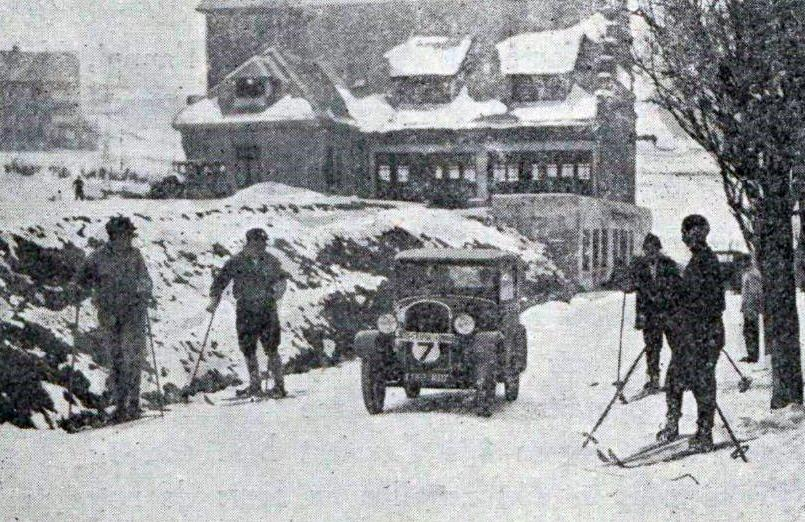
The 1930 Rallye Paris – Saint-Raphaël Féminin.

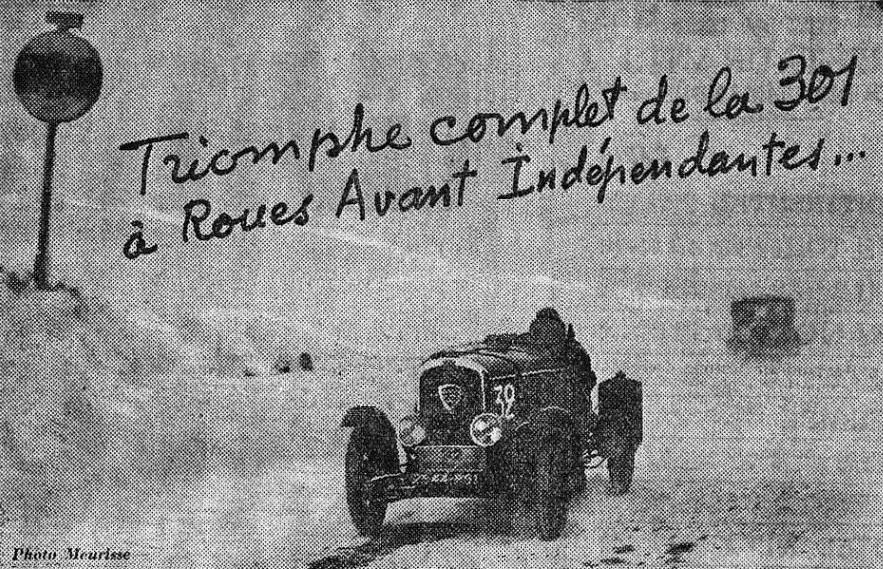
The 1933 Rallye féminin Paris – Saint-Raphaël winning Peugeot 301.

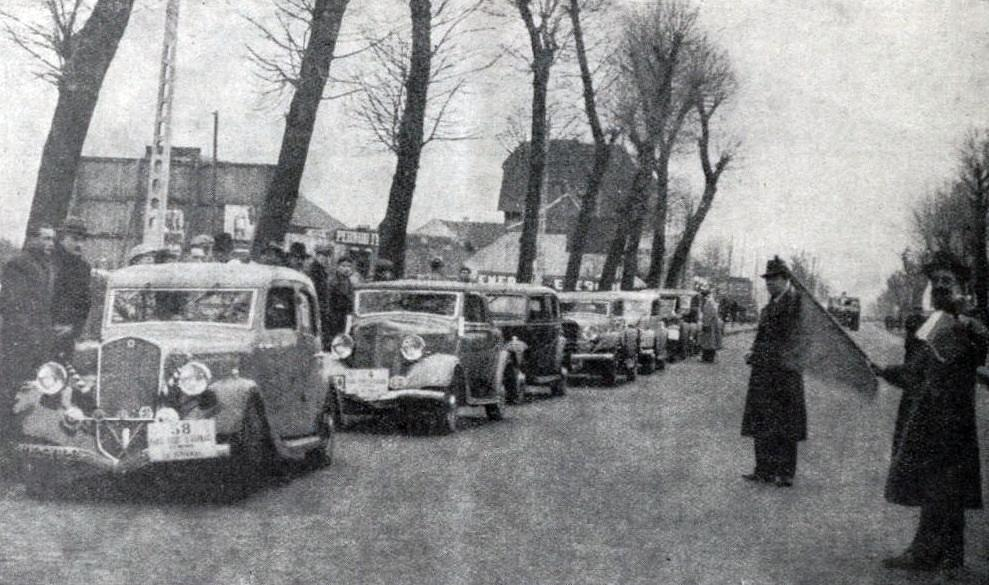
Departure from the Old Post Office in Orly, February 1935.

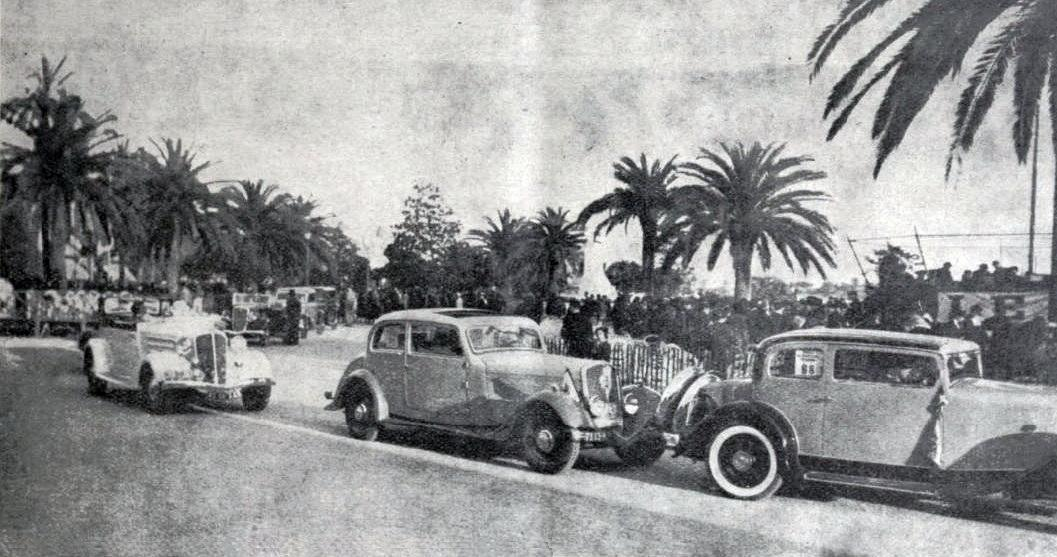
Concours d'Élégance in Cannes for the 1935 rally.
