= Régine Gordine =

French rally and circuit driver

Régine Gordine (1915–2012) was a French rally and circuit driver who was most active in the 1950s.

== Biography ==
She was born Régine Mirielle Peter on 24 November 1915 in Besançon. (Some sources indicate her birth name was Bruno, and that Peter was her first husband's surname.) She participated in rallies before World War II, and after the war was recruited by Germaine Rouault to join her 1950 24 Hours of Le Mans entry.

In 1952, she met film producer and amateur racer Sacha Gordine, whom she soon married. In 1955, she raced in the Monte Carlo Rally while pregnant with their son, Sacha Gordine Jr. The two led a glamorous life, mixing with movie stars and nobility. Gordine was sometimes styled Princess of Bashkir, a title she apparently inherited due to her husband's Russian aristocratic lineage.

Following her husband's death in 1968, she married printer and race driver Léon Storez.

Gordine died on 20 May 2012 in Breteuil, Eure.

== Record ==
=== Le Mans ===
- 1950 24 Hours of Le Mans, teammate Germaine Rouault, Simca-Gordini, retired

=== Monte Carlo Rally ===
- 1950, teammate Germaine Rouault, Simca 8 coupe, No. 236. (16th) Ladies' Cup
- 1951, teammate Yvonne Simon, Simca 8 sports coupe, No. 103, (130th), Ladies' Cup 2nd

=== Soleil Cannes Rally ===
- 1946 (as Régine Peter), co-drivers Germaine Rouault and Suzanne Largeot, Delahaye 135, 1st

=== Tour de France automobile ===
- 1951, co-driver Mme. Boeswillwald, Peugeot 203, 50th, 2nd Ladies' Cup
- 1952, co-driver Germaine Rouault, Renault 4 cv 1063, 17th

=== Mille Miglia ===
- 1955, co-driver Lise Renaud, Moretti 750, retired
- 1957, co-driver Lise Renaud, Citroen DS 19, retired
