= Hellé Nice =

French racing car driver (1900–1984)

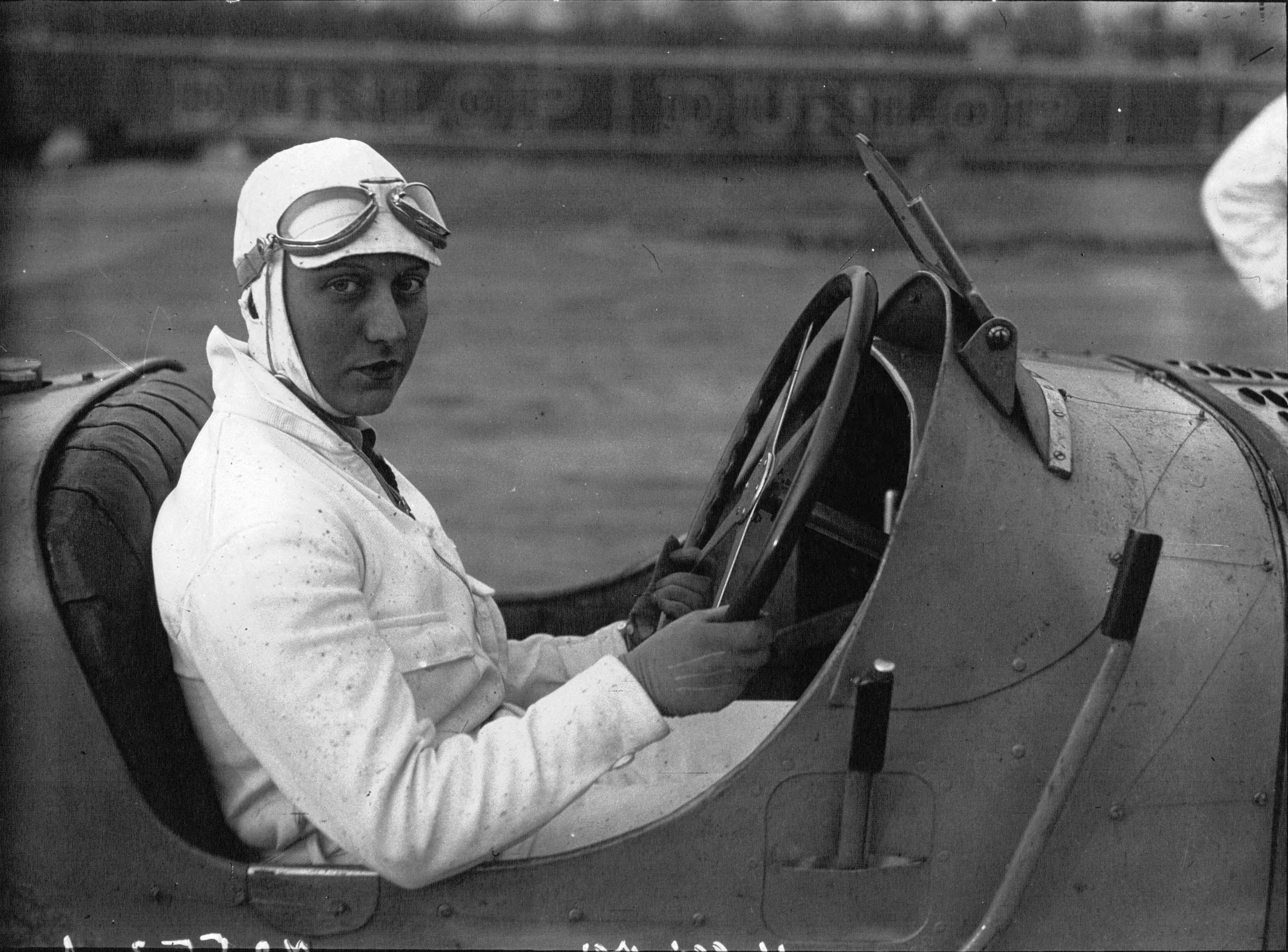
- Hellé Nice in 1929 at Autodrome de Linas-Montlhéry
- Nationality: French
- Born: Mariette Hélène Delangle; 15 December 1900 Aunay-sous-Auneau, Eure-et-Loir, France
- Died: 1 October 1984 (aged 83) Nice, Provence-Alpes-Côte d'Azur
- Debut season: 1929
- Former teams: Bugatti; Alfa Romeo
- Starts: At least 70 events of all kinds, including around 32 minor grands prix
- Finished last season: 1949

Mariette Hélène Delangle (1900–1984), better known by her stage name Hellé Nice, was a French dancer and motor racing driver. She danced in Paris at the Hôtel Ritz, Olympia Hall and Casino de Paris, before her career was ended by a skiing accident. She became a racing driver, using roadster cars built by companies such as Alfa Romeo, Bugatti, DKW, Ford, Hispano-Suiza, Renault and Rosengart. She competed in various Grand Prix motor racing, hillclimbing and rally events at a time when it was rare for a woman to do so. She won the Grand Prix Féminin and the Actor's Championship in 1929. Already famous in Paris, she became a household name in France in the early 1930s and raced as an exhibition dirt track driver for a season in the United States.

Nice won the Rallye Paris – Saint-Raphaël Féminin in 1932 with Odette Siko. Racing was a dangerous profession in which some of her friends and lovers died. In 1949, the racing driver Louis Chiron accused Nice without evidence of being a Gestapo agent in World War II. The allegation ruined her planned comeback and her partner eventually left her. She lived her last years in poverty and estranged from her family, supported by the charity La Roue Tourne. She died in Nice in 1984. A 2005 biography The Bugatti Queen: In search of a motor-racing legend by Miranda Seymour rehabilitated her reputation and her grave was marked by a plaque in 2010.

== Early life ==
Mariette Hélène Delangle was born on 15 December 1901, to Alexandrine Estelle and Léon Aristide Delangle. Her father worked as the postman in Aunay-sous-Auneau, a village 40 miles from Paris. At three years old, she witnessed the 1903 Paris–Madrid race passing near to Aunay at Bourdinière. In 1915, she moved to Sainte-Mesme with her mother and three years later, she moved to Paris, living in rented apartments near Avenue des Ternes in the 17th arrondissement for the next decade. She worked as a nude model for artist René Carrère and performed as a dancer.

== Stage ==
Through Carrère, Delangle met Gérard de Courcelles and Marcel Mongin who ran a car accessory business together and raced sports cars. She passed her driving test in 1920 and decided to drive her Citroën car on a road trip around France. She travelled to England with the two men in 1921; they were planning to race Grégoire cars at the Brooklands circuit but the cars were not delivered. Delangle was disappointed that the race was for men only. Delangle moved to rue Saint-Senoch, still in the 17th arrondissement and became a dance partner of Celéstin Eugène Vandevelde, taking the stage name Hellé Nice. Their dance act became famous as they performed together at the Hôtel Ritz and the Olympia Hall. By 1927 she was well-known enough to accept a billing at the Casino de Paris, where she danced in a show headlined by Maurice Chevalier called Wings over Paris (French: Les Ailes de Paris). Two years later, whilst skiing offpiste at Megève, she injured the cartilage in her knee. She did perform again after taking a year to recover, but she decided to switch to motor racing, taking morphine for the pain.

== Racing ==
Nice entered her first women's Grand Prix motor racing event in June 1929 (the Grand Prix Féminin), racing against Aniela d'Elern, Dominique Ferrand, Violette Morris and Lucy O'Reilly Schell. She was mentored by Mongin and trained hard, driving ten laps a day of the Autodrome de Linas-Montlhéry; at the wheel of an Oméga-Six car, she came first. The next day, she was invited to the Bugatti showroom on Avenue Montaigne in order to discuss driving a Type 43A roadster in the Actor's Championship. She met drivers Guy Bouriat and Albert Divo, and won the championship. She also won the race at Le Touquet in a 1928 Rosengart. She signed a sponsorship deal with Lucky Strike cigarettes and bought herself a yacht and a black Hispano-Suiza car.

Ettore Bugatti invited her to drive a Type 35 in speed trials at the Montlhéry circuit, advised by Bouriat and Divo. In December, she recorded a speed of 196.871 km/h over 5 km (with a best lap at 197.7 km/h (123.56 mph)). (Note: Janine Jennky had achieved a speed of 199.059 km/h in a 2-litre Bugatti at the Arpajon speed trials on 26 August 1928.) At the time she was having an affair with Bruno, Count of Harcourt who was married to Princess Isabelle of Orléans. She bought one of the cars she had used in the time trials for 40,000 francs and travelled to the Moroccan Grand Prix in Casablanca where she hoped to spend time with the count. He died after crashing in practice and she withdrew from the race. She raced in the Grand Prix Bugatti on the Le Mans Bugatti Circuit, coming third out of three behind Max Fourny and Juan Zanelli. At the Stade Buffalo in Montrouge, Paris, she fell off a motorcycle then jumped up and took a bow.

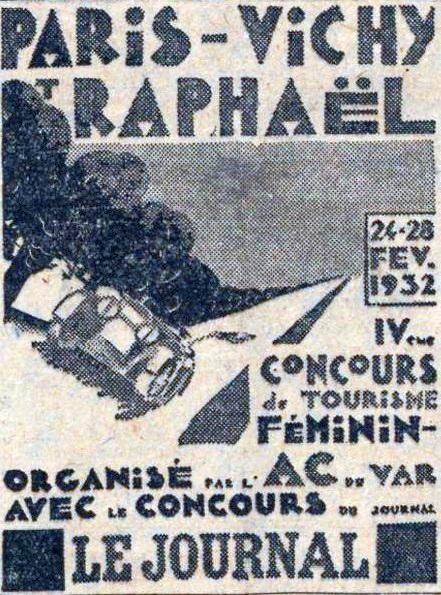
Poster for the 1932 Rallye Paris – Saint-Raphaël Féminin

Nice had become a household name in France and capitalising on her fame, she toured the United States in 1930. She practiced dirt track racing at Harrington Park, New Jersey and was paid $200 per event as an exhibition driver. Her first appearance was in Woodbridge and she was nicknamed the "Speedbowl Queen", gaining a sponsorship deal with Esso. Promoters told her she was the first woman to race cars in the US; Joan la Costa and Elfreida Mais had done it previously, although no woman had raced on dirt tracks. Nice drove at dangerous circuits such as Langhorne Speedway where deaths frequently occurred: Bill Albertson shared tips with her and died on the Orange County Fair Speedway in 1930; her friend Herman Schurch died on a practice run at the Legion Ascot Speedway the following year. After eight weeks, she was offered a contract extension. She drove cars borrowed from other drivers, such as an American-made Miller. In Winston-Salem, North Carolina she hit a pothole and crashed; her last ride was at Spartanburg, South Carolina and she holidayed in Florida before returning to Europe.

Nice appeared at the 1931 Mi-Carême carnival in Nantes and continued to race cars. She broke time records in a hillclimb on Mont Ventoux in Provence and competed in the Women's Championship at Montlhéry. In July 1931, she came second to Anne Itier in the Coupe des Dames at Reims and in the 2-litre race she came fourth, competing against male drivers such as Louis Chiron, Stanisław Czaykowski, René Dreyfus, Philippe Etancelin and the eventual winner Marcel Lehoux. The following month she came ninth in her blue Bugatti at the Grand Prix du Comminges, was the only female entrant at the Monza Grand Prix in Milan and competed in the Grand Prix on the beach at La Baule-Escoublac. She earned significant amounts from racing, receiving entry fees of 5,000 to 6,000 francs per race. Nice's biographer Miranda Seymour reports that she took many lovers in the early 1930s, including Georges d'Arnoux, Roger Bonnet, René Carrière, Marcel Lehoux and Philippe de Rothschild.

Nice started 1932 by winning the Rallye Paris – Saint-Raphaël Féminin with Odette Siko in an Alfa Romeo 6C. For the 1932 Grand Prix season, she travelled south with Lehoux for the Algerian Grand Prix at Oran, coming second in the 2-litre category. At the Moroccan Grand Prix in Casablanca, she failed to qualify and Lehoux came first. During the 1933 Grand Prix season, she participated in fewer events because of a burst appendix. She was flagged off ninth at the Monza Grand Prix on the Autodromo Nazionale Monza which was held the same day as the Italian Grand Prix, on a different circuit. Three drivers died, namely Giuseppe Campari, Baconin Borzacchini and Stanislas Czaikowski. Guy Bouriat, who had helped her in 1929, died at the Picardy Grand Prix. Nice won the Woman's Grand Prix again at Montlhéry and in the Coupe des Alpes came third with Roger Bonnet. The following year, at the Grand Prix de Dieppe, Nice saw her friend Jean Gaupillat crash into a tree in qualifying (he later died). She raced in the final despite women not normally being permitted to do so, coming seventh whilst competing against drivers such as Chiron, Lehoux, Etancelin and Francis Curzon, 5th Earl Howe. She also placed seventh in the Algerian Grand Prix.

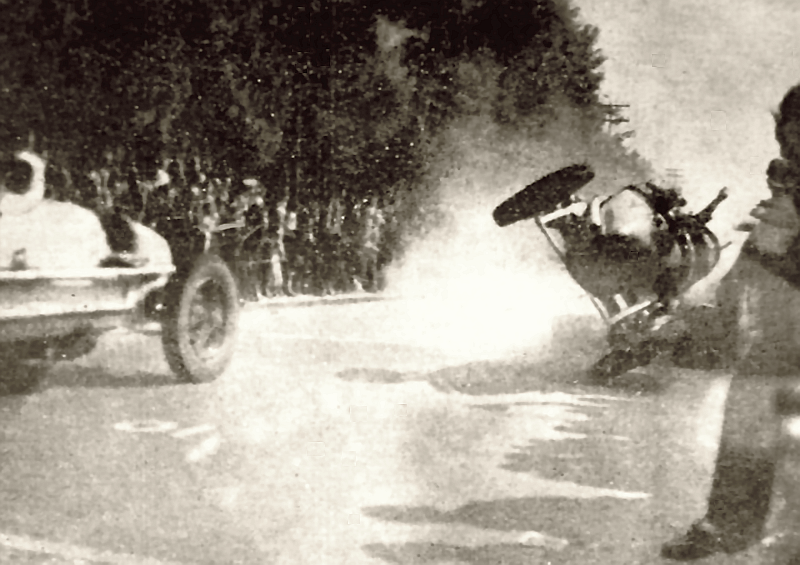
The accident at the 1936 São Paulo Grand Prix

Nice travelled to Brazil in 1936 with her future partner Arnaldo Binelli, intending to compete in two Grand Prix races. During the São Paulo Grand Prix, she was in third place behind Brazilian champion Manuel de Teffé when her Alfa Romeo hit a hay bale and crashed into the grandstand, killing six people and injuring more than thirty others. Nice was thrown from the car, landing on a soldier who died; because she was unconscious, she was also thought to be dead. She was hospitalised and in a coma for three days, until she woke up. Whilst in hospital she was visited by President Getúlio Vargas and her lover Henri Thouvenet wrote from France to ensure she was not held responsible for the crash and received compensation. On her return to France, Nice became embroiled in a scandal over the importation of cars without paying duty and alongside other racing drivers such as Robert Brunet, Philippe Etancelin, Benoît Falchetto and Raymond Sommer was convicted and ordered to pay a fine.

In 1937, she participated in the Yacco oil endurance trials with Claire Descollas, Simone des Forest and Odette Siko at the Montlhéry circuit. Alternating with the three other women, Nice drove a Matford car with a V8 engine for ten days and ten nights, the team breaking ten world records. The following year, the German Fritz Huschke von Hanstein asked her to accompany him in the Chamonix rally in a DKW car. She won her last race in 1939 just before war broke out, driving a Renault 4CV in the Comminges.

During World War II, Nice lived with Binelli in Paris then in 1943 they moved to Villa des Pins on avenue Jean de la Fontaine, in the hills above Nice in the south of France. In 1949, the noted racing driver Louis Chiron accused her of being a Gestapo agent in the war, at a party in Monaco to celebrate the first postwar Monte Carlo Rally. She was too shocked to reply at the time and she was later ostracised. Her biographer Miranda Seymour considers what the evidence could have been: a connection to Fritz Huschke von Hanstein did not prove problematic for fellow driver Anne Itier, who was known to have had an affair with him; in Nice's archives, Seymour found a picture of German General of the Cavalry Manfred von Richthofen, who had written to Nice in 1936 after her accident in Brazil, but no further link could be found; enquiries at the German Federal Archives in Berlin yielded no record of Nice having been a collaborator. Despite the allegations not being backed by facts, they were enough to deter sponsors and thus ended her racing career. She attempted to participate in the 1951 Nice Grand Prix but was replaced at the last minute by a young Jean Behra.

== Final years and death ==
Nice lived in poverty in her later years. She moved from Nice to Magagnosc in 1957 and three years later Binelli left her. She asked for help from the charity La Roue Tourne and lived above their offices in Paris, acting as a chauffeur. After she returned to Nice, she went to hospital in September 1984 for an operation on her legs, then fell into a coma from which she never recovered. La Roue Tourne organised a memorial service for her and her ashes were sent to Sainte-Mesme, where her estranged sister refused to engrave her name upon the family gravestone.

After Nice's name had fallen into obscurity, Miranda Seymour's 2005 biography The Bugatti Queen renewed interest, although Seymour has acknowledged that the book is partly speculative. In 2010, the Hellé Nice Foundation installed a plaque commemorating Nice in the graveyard. The 1927 Bugatti Type 35B she had owned was sold in 2014 by auction at the Pebble Beach Concours d'Elegance in the US for $2,970,000. It was previously owned and raced as a vintage car by Brian Brunkhorst.

== Racing record ==
=== Career highlights ===
Season	Series	Position	Co-driver	Team	Car
1929	Montlhéry Grand Prix Féminin	1st			Oméga-Six
1929	Actor's Championship	1st		Bugatti	Type 43
1929	Le Touquet	1st			1928 Rosengart
1929	Autodrome de Linas-Montlhéry speed trials			Bugatti	Type 35
1929	Grand Prix Bugatti on Le Mans Bugatti Circuit	3rd		Bugatti	Type 35
1930	Exhibition on Woodbridge Township, New Jersey circuit	Crashed			Frontenac
1930	Exhibition on Langhorne Speedway				
1930	Exhibition on Winston-Salem, North Carolina circuit				
1930	Exhibition on Spartanburg, South Carolina circuit				
1931	Montlhéry Grand Prix Féminin				
1931	Coupe des Dames	2nd			
1931	Reims Grand Prix	4th in 2-litre category			
1931	Grand Prix du Comminges	9th			Bugatti Type 35
1931	Monza Grand Prix				
1931	La Baule-Escoublac				
1932	Rallye Paris – Saint-Raphaël Féminin	1st	Odette Siko		Alfa Romeo 6C
1932	Algerian Grand Prix	2nd in 2-litre category			
1932	Moroccan Grand Prix	Failed to qualify			
1933	Monza Grand Prix	9th		Alfa Romeo	
1933	Montlhéry Grand Prix Féminin	1st			
1933	Coupe des Alpes	3rd	Roger Bonnet		
1933	Coppa Acerbo	8th		Mlle "Helle-Nice"	Bugatti Type 35
1934	Grand Prix de Dieppe	7th			
1934	Algerian Grand Prix	7th		Alfa Romeo	Alfa Romeo Monza
1934	Eifelrennen			Mlle "Helle-Nice"	Alfa Romeo Monza
1935	Grand Prix de Pau	8th		Alfa Romeo	Alfa Romeo Monza
1936	Grand Prix de Pau			Mlle "Helle-Nice"	Alfa Romeo Monza
1936	São Paulo Grand Prix	Crashed whilst 3rd / 4th		Alfa Romeo	Alfa Romeo 8C 3200
1936	Monte Carlo Rally	1st in Coupe des Dames			Ford V8
1937	Yacco Oil endurance trials on Montlhéry circuit		Claire Descollas, Simone des Forest, Odette Siko	Matford	Matford car with a V8 engine
1938	Chamonix Rally		Fritz Huschke von Hanstein		DKW
1939	Comminges	1st			Renault Juvaquatre
1949	Monte Carlo Rally				Renault 4CV
