= Jean de Montrémy =

French industrialist and racing driver

- Born: May 18, 1913
- Died: December 16, 1998 (aged 85)
- Occupations: Industrialist; Racing driver

Jean Waldruche de Montrémy (1913–1998) was a French industrialist, racing driver, motorsport official, and race car designer.

== Biography ==
Jean de Montrémy was born on 18 May 1913. He completed his education at Reims, and also officiated at races on the nearby racing track. de Montrémy married Odile Hémard.

In 1937–38 the apéritif-distilling Hémard family acquired a controlling interest in Monopole, an automobile parts manufacturing company based in Poissy. In 1944 de Montrémy became managing director of Monpole. To promote the company's products, he established Écurie Monopole, and designed and built racing cars for them. He was directly involved in the development of the earliest Monopole racing cars and was responsible for racing operations for all models up to the X89. de Montrémy also raced the cars himself, driving Monopoles in several major events, most notably at Le Mans, from 1947 to 1955.

Although the first barquette designed by de Montrémy used a Simca engine, all subsequent Monopole racers starting with the 1954 X84 Tank used the air-cooled 2-cylinder flat twin engine from car builder Panhard. Following the 1955 Le Mans accident, Panhard decided to withdraw from direct involvement in racing. The Écurie Monopole racing operation was made Panhard's official racing team in 1956, and Panhard's own racing cars were transferred to Monopole. From 1958 on the cars were called either "Panhard Monopoles" or "Monopole Panhards" depending on which company's literature was the source.

In 1952 de Montrémy was appointed race director at Le Mans, and it was in that capacity rather than as a driver that he saw his X84 model win the Performance Index and the eighteenth Biennial Cup for the third year running, becoming the only manufacturer to achieve three consecutive victories.

For his personal transport, de Montrémy frequently opted for cars from Facel Vega, at various times owning a 1962 Facel II (serial number A157), an FV1 Cabriolet, an HK 500, and a Facellia.

Jean de Montrémy died on 16 December 1998.

== Racing career ==
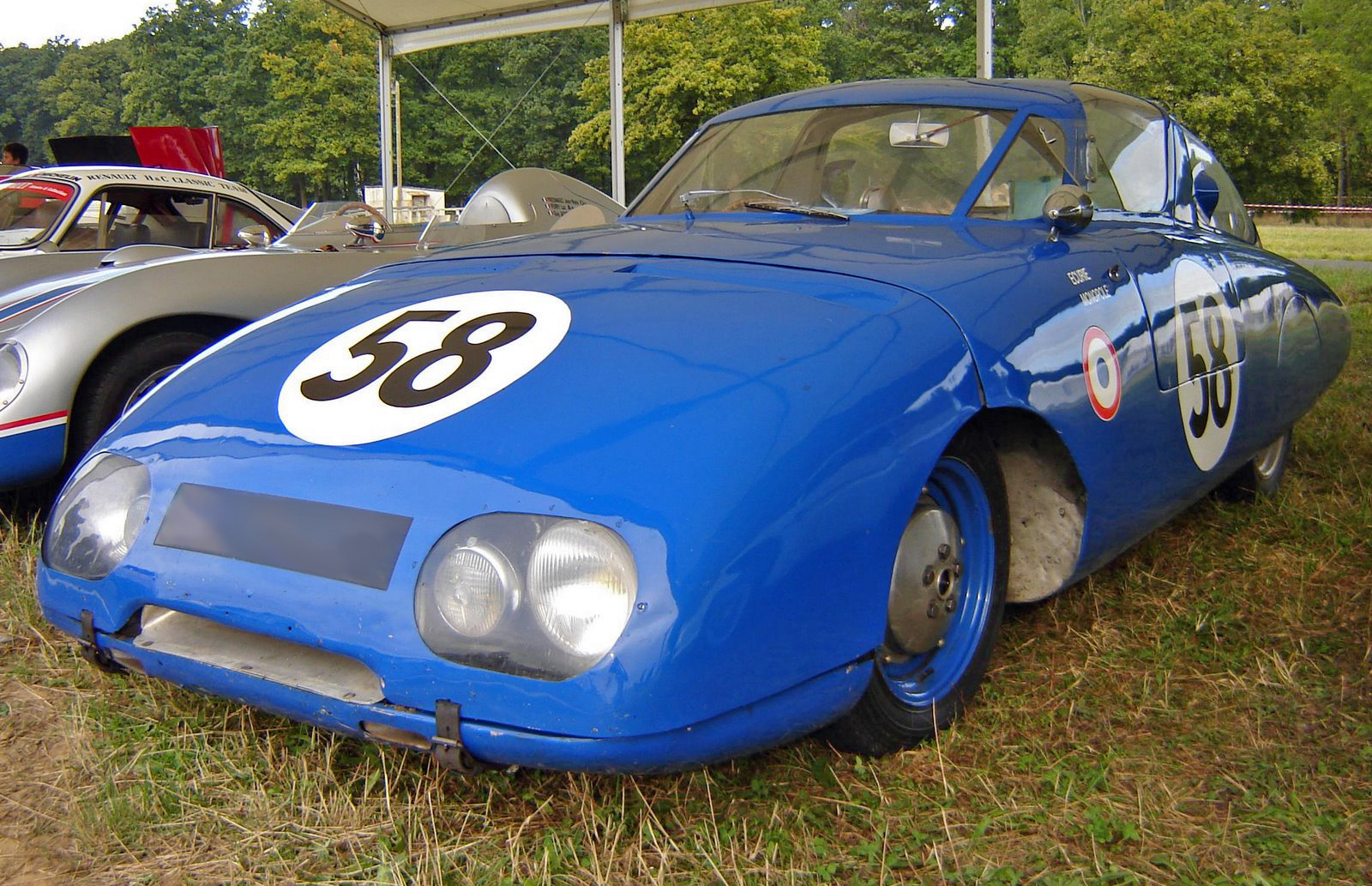
A 1956 Monopole X86, front three-quarter view.

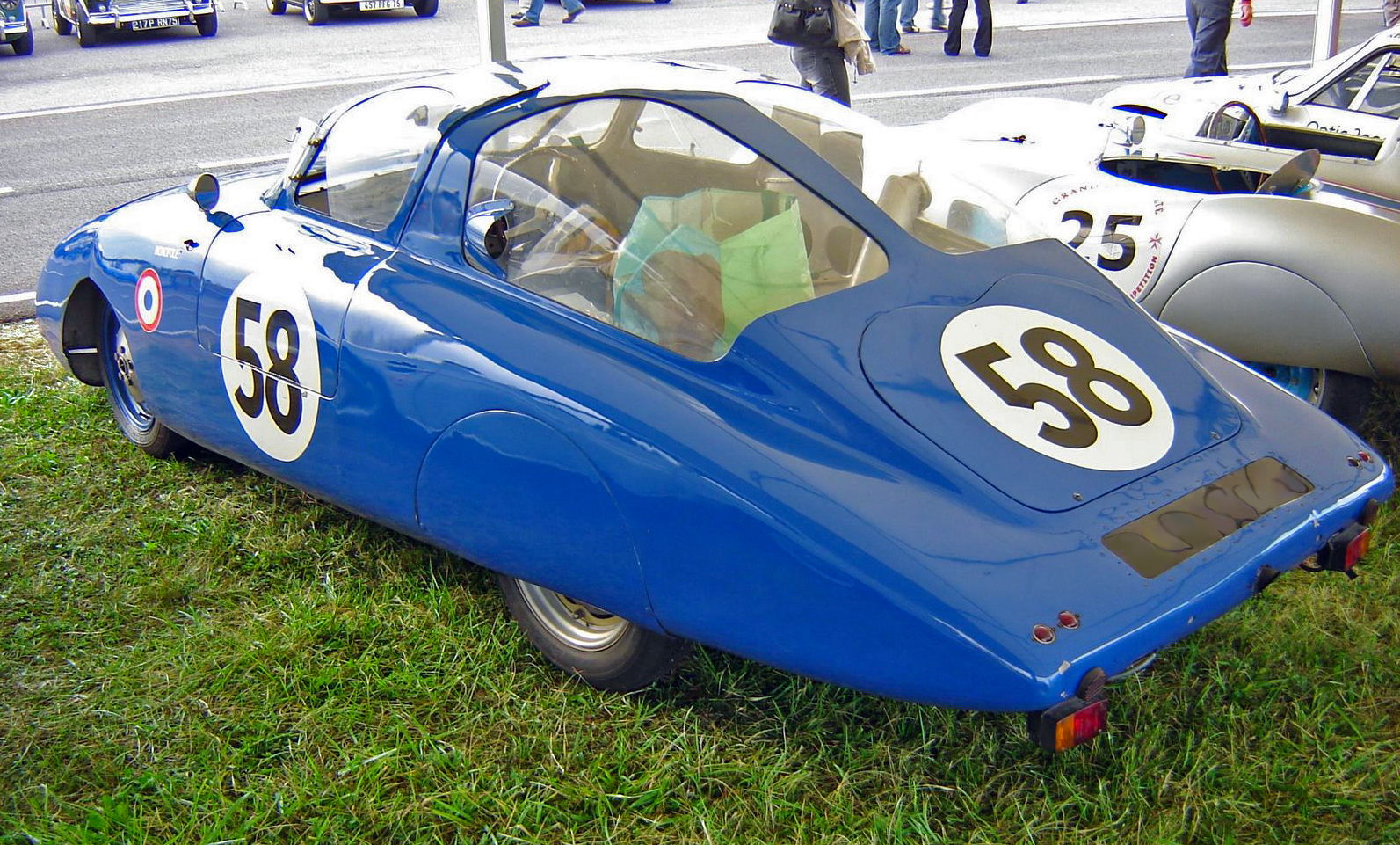
A 1956 Monopole X86, rear three-quarter view.

de Montrémy's first major race was the 1947 Formula Libre at the Reims circuit, where he finished seventh in his Simca-powered Monopole Sport. In 1948 he began to focus on endurance races, retiring from the 24 Hours of Spa, and finishing ninth with teammate Eugène Dussous at the 1948 12 Hours of Paris.

de Montrémy's first appearance at La Sarthe was at the 1949 24 Hours of Le Mans where he and brother-in-law co-driver Jean Hémard finished twelfth and won their class. In 1950 de Montrémy and Hémard won the 16th Biennial Cup and tied for the Index of Performance, and in 1951 won both the Biennial Cup and the Index of Performance a second time. In 1953 the pair returned for a twentyfourth place finish. In five appearances at Le Mans between 1949 and 1955, de Montrémy was among the top 25 finishers four times.

In 1954 de Montrémy finished in twelfth place at the Coupe d'Automne, and in 1955 placed tenth at the Bol d'Or automobile with John Simone.

== Racing record ==
=== Le Mans results ===
Year	Team	Co-Drivers	Car	Class	Laps	Pos.	Class Pos.
1949	France Établissements Monopole	France Eugène Dussous	Monopole Sport	S 1.1	185	12th	1st
1950	France Établissements Monopole	France Jean Hémard	Monopole X84 Tank	S 750	180	22nd	1st
1951	France Établissements Monopole	France Jean Hémard	Monopole X84	S 750	194	23rd	1st
1953	France Automobiles Panhard et Levassor	France Jean Hémard	Monopole X85	S750	212	24th	
1955	France Écurie Monopole	France Francis Navarro	Monopole X88 Sport	S 750	30	DNF	

=== World Sportscar Championship results ===
Saison	Team	Car	1	2	3	4	5	6	7
1953	Monopole	Monopole X85	USA	ITA	FRA	BEL	DEU	UK	MEX
1953	Monopole	Monopole X85			DNF				
1955	Monopole	Monopole X88	ARG	USA	ITA	FRA	UK	ITA	
1955	Monopole	Monopole X88				DNF			
