= Fritz Huschke von Hanstein =

German racing driver (1911–1996)

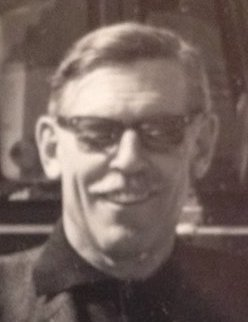
- Huschke von Hanstein, 1963
- Nationality: German
- Born: Fritz Sittig Enno Werner von Hanstein; 3 January 1911 Halle
- Died: 5 March 1996 (aged 85) Stuttgart
- Years active: Circa 1935–65
- Teams: Porsche, BMW

Championship titles
- Winner; 1940 Mille Miglia; Winner; 1956 Targa Florio

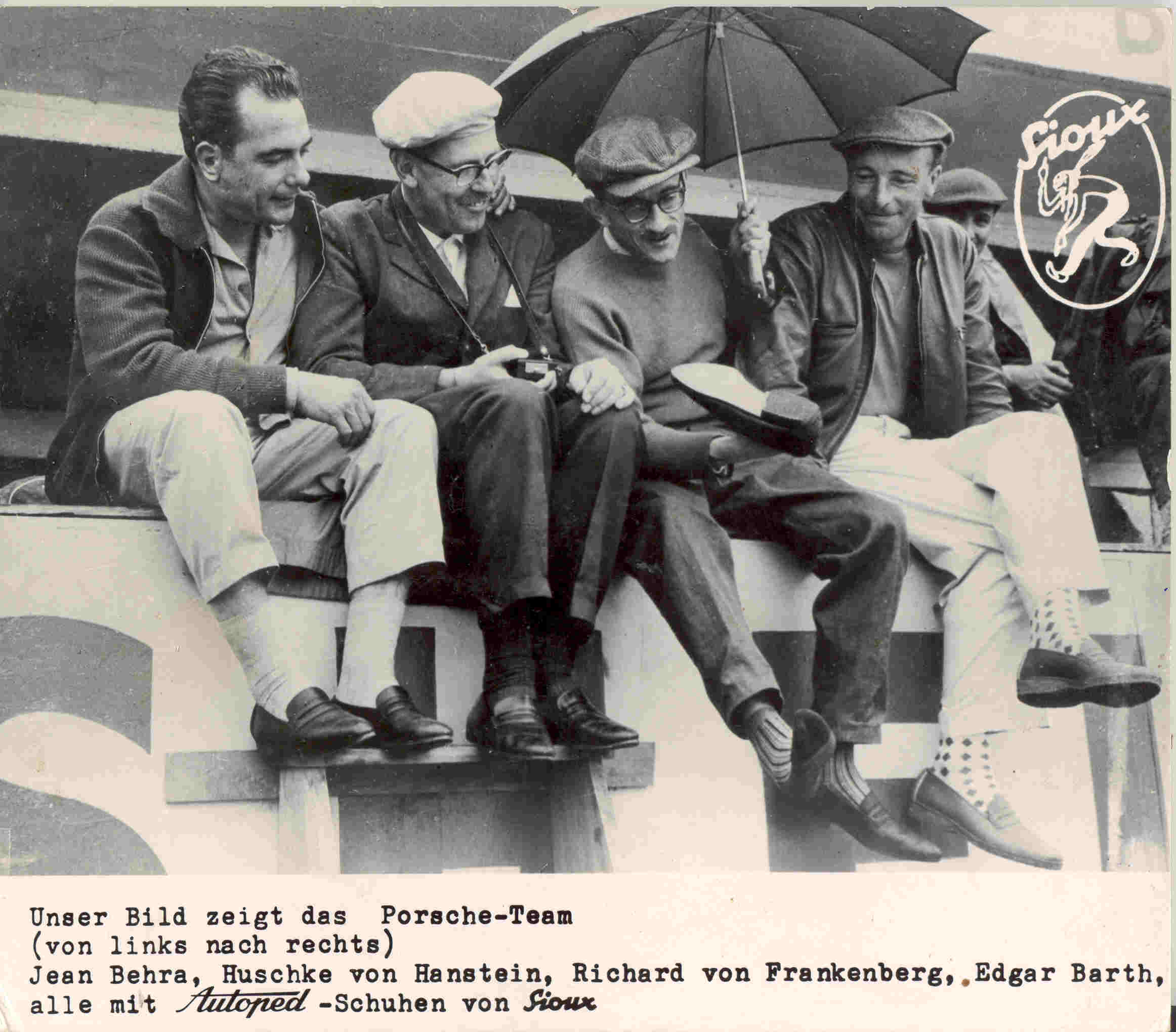
Fritz Huschke von Hanstein (second from left) with Jean Behra, Richard von Frankenberg and Edgar Barth

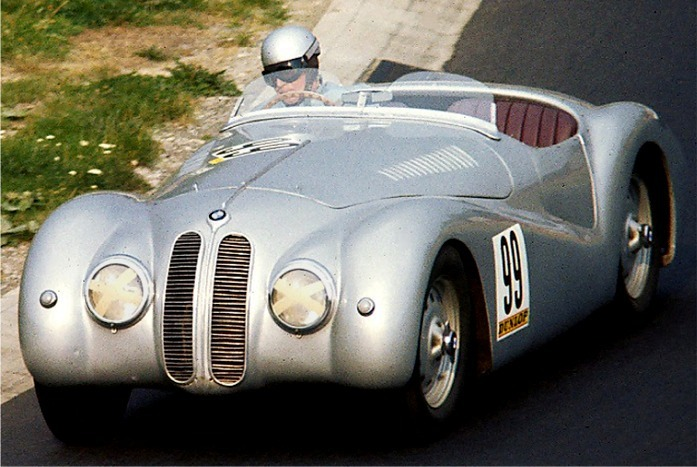
BMW 328 "Mille Miglia", driven by Adolf Brudes at Nürburgring, 1976

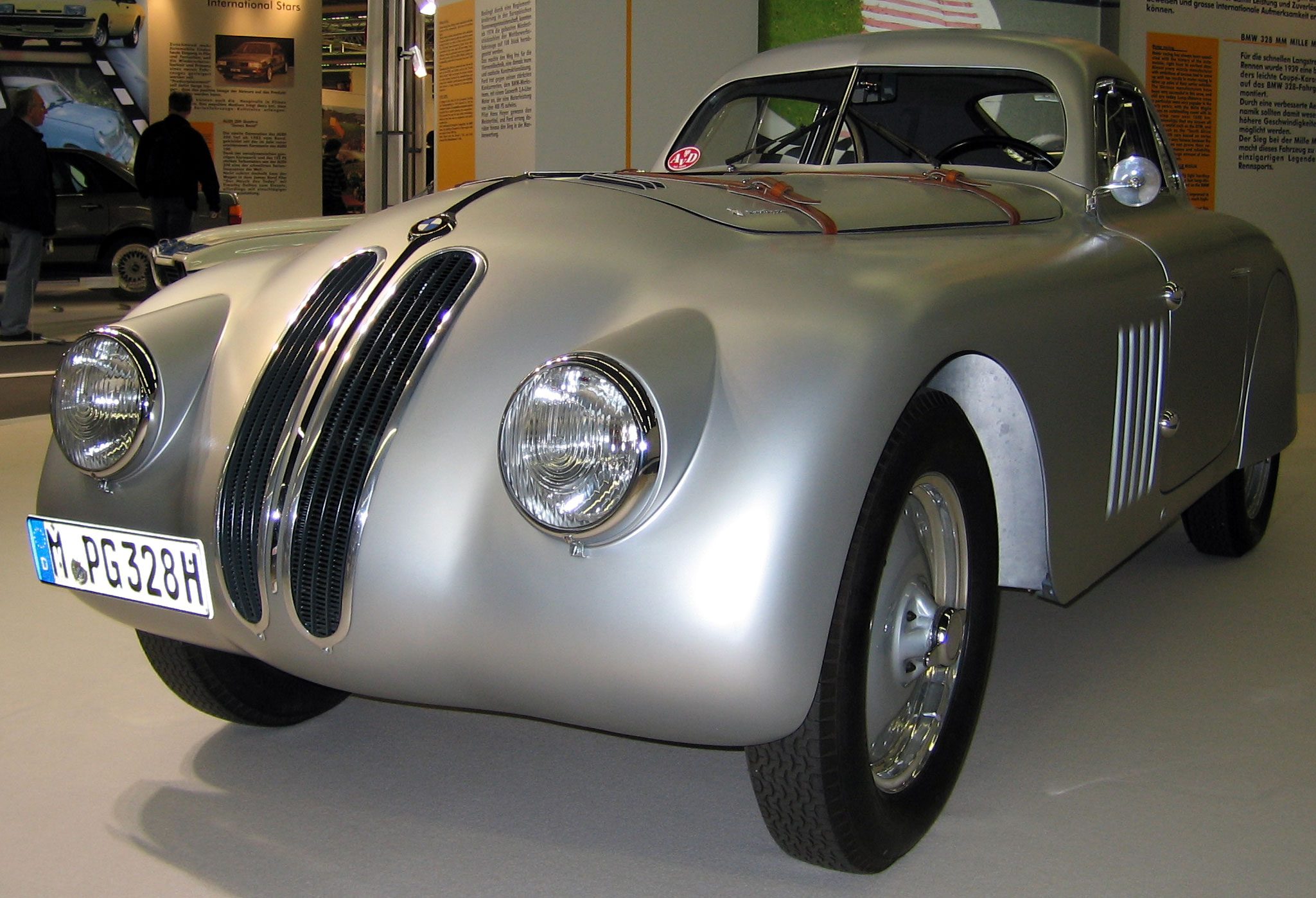
The 1940 Mille Miglia winning BMW, with streamlined top

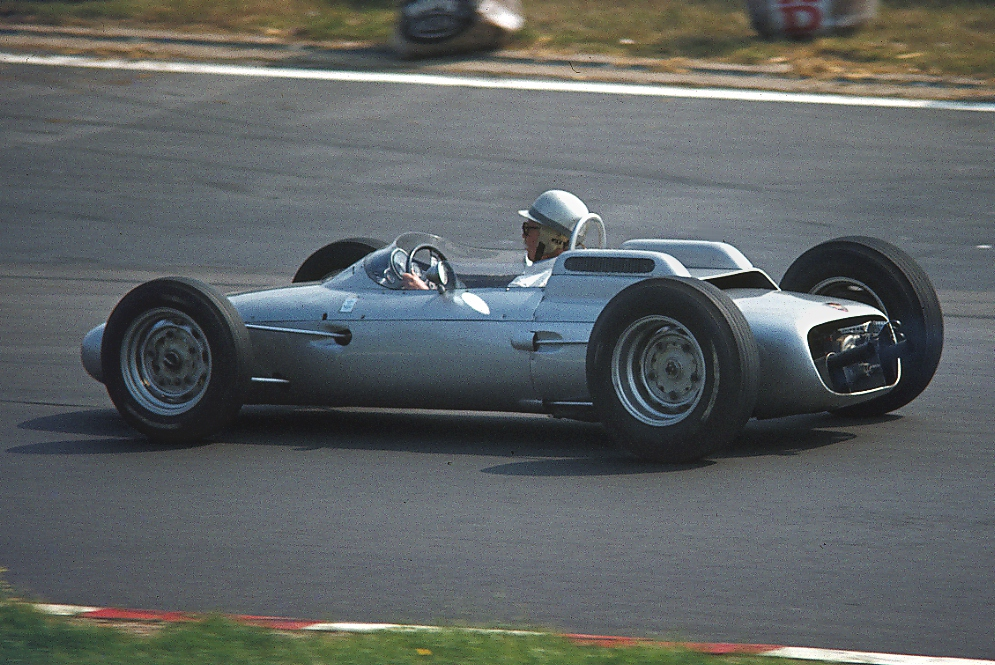
Huschke von Hanstein in 1981, demonstrating a Porsche 804 at Nürburgring

Fritz Sittig Enno Werner von Hanstein (3 January 1911 – 5 March 1996) nicknamed "Huschke von Hanstein", was a German racing driver who from the 1950s served both as Porsche's public relations manager and chief of their racing department.

== Biography ==
Hanstein was born in Halle, German Empire, to a Prussian noble family which originated in the Eichsfeld. His father, Carlo von Hanstein (1875–1936) was a Prussian Army officer and Junker.

In 1936 "Huschke" entered the Olympic event "Internationale Olympia-Automobil-Stern-Fahrt", in the late 1930s he drove a BMW 328 sports car. As he had joined the SS, his car was fitted with SS rune number plates (SS-333). In 1940, he, together with Walter Bäumer, won the Mille Miglia in a BMW 328 coupe. He is one of the only three non-Italians to have won the Mille Miglia, along with fellow German and 1931 winner Rudolf Caracciola and 1955 winner Stirling Moss.

As a result of World War II, Hanstein's family's possessions were lost in socialist East Germany. In June 1950, he married Ursula von Kaufmann (1916–2005) on the Nürburgring race track. After the war, Hanstein began a new career. In 1950, he joined Volkswagen in the press department and in 1951, moved to Porsche, where he was head of public relations and race director from 1952 to 1968. Hanstein joined Porsche, then a small sports car manufacturer, serving as a kind of ambassador especially to foreign markets like France, which were rather difficult for Germans at the time. He became the face of Porsche to the motorsports world and press, a perfect partner for Ferry Porsche's more quiet leadership. Due to his aristocratic background and diplomatic skills, he succeeded both in selling cars as well as passing technical inspections before races, like at the 24 Hours of Le Mans where he led Porsche 356 to class wins.

In 1956, Hanstein drove a Porsche 550 Spyder all the way to Sicily to enter in the Targa Florio, for which he hired Umberto Maglioli. The experienced Italian did most of the driving in the long-distance race across the mountains, scoring Porsche's first major win. Hanstein led the Porsche racing teams until the middle of the 1960s, when Porsche decided to let young engineers like Ferdinand Piëch take over. Without Hanstein's aristocratic skills, the Porsche team promptly ran into trouble at 1968 24 Hours of Le Mans due to misunderstandings with the French.

Huschke von Hanstein, the so-called "racing baron", continued to serve as representative in German and international automobile organizations. During the mid-1970s, he was the German representative for the Commission Sportive Internationale (CSI), the organization responsible for all racing regulations for Formula One. He died in 1996 in Stuttgart.

Michael Schumacher, describing one of the most prominent figures of international motor sports, says: "For decades and generations, Huschke von Hanstein was one of the most scintillating personalities to be found on and near race tracks." Dedicated to motor sports in all its forms, he was at home on all the world's motor sports venues, equally successful in off-road events, circuit racing, and long-distance trials, on two wheels or four. Huschke von Hanstein, driving a BMW 328, won the 1940 Mille Miglia. And it was the "Racing Baron" whose efforts as a public relations officer, race car driver and racing team manager catapulted Porsche to worldwide fame in the 1950s and 1960s.

In one person, he combined the skills of racing driver, racing director, chief PR officer, photographer, film cameraman, inventor and innovator.

He was responsible for the appearance of advertising on race cars. Safety features as diverse as helmets for driver head protection as early as 1938, later fireproof driving suits, and striped pedestrian cross-walks all owe their existence to his efforts. His expertise and his ever-masterful, professional demeanor, molded by an aristocrat's cosmopolitan familiarity with the world, captivated his racing contemporaries, colleagues and rivals alike.

== Racing statistics ==
=== Le Mans results ===
Year	Entrant	Car	Co-driver(s)	Position
1937	(France) Mme Anne-Cécile Rose-Itier	Adler Trumpf Rennlimousine	(France) Anne-Cécile Rose-Itier	DNF
1952	(Germany) Porsche KG	Porsche 356 SL	(Germany) Petermax Müller	DNF

=== Sebring results ===
Year	Entrant	Car	Co-drivers	Position
1955	(Germany) Porsche K.G. and B. S. Cunningham	Porsche 550 Spyder	(Germany) Herbert Linge	8
1956	(Germany) Porsche K.G.	Porsche 550	(United States) Mike Marshall (United States) Jan Brundage	14
1957	(Germany) Porsche K.G.	Porsche 550 RS	(Germany) Herbert Linge	31
1958	(Germany) Porsche K.G.	Porsche 356A Carrera	(Germany) Herbert Linge (United States) John Cuevas	10 (Class victory)
1959	(Germany) Porsche K.G.	Porsche 356A Carrera GT	(Netherlands) Carel Godin de Beaufort	11 (Class victory)

== Bibliography ==
- Fritz Huschke von Hanstein: Automobilsport : Training, Technik, Taktik, Rowohlt, 1978, rororo-Sachbuch, ISBN 3-499-17015-9
- Aichele, Tobias (1999). Huschke von Hanstein. Der Rennbaron. Verlag Könemann. ISBN 3-8290-2900-4. Additional ISBN 978-3829029001, English version ISBN 3-8290-3320-6.
- Ursula von Hanstein: Erzähl doch mal..., 2000, ISBN 9783933486158, German
- Genealogisches Handbuch des Adels, Adelige Häuser A Band XV, Seite 226, Band 71 der Gesamtreihe, C. A. Starke Verlag, Limburg (Lahn) 1979, ISSN 0435-2408.
