= Simone Louise des Forest =

French driver

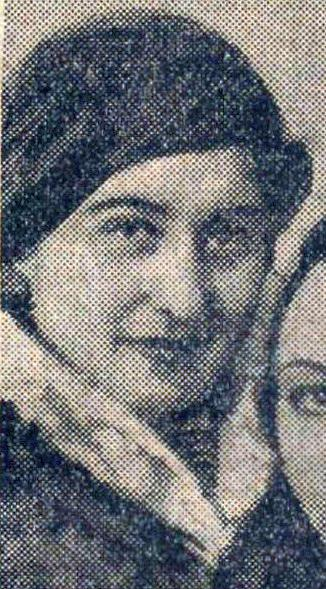
- Born: Louise Simone Pinet de Borde des Forest; 7 March 1910; Royan
- Died: 15 November 2004; Vichy

Simone Louise Pinet de Borde des Forest, generally called Simone Louise des Forest or simply Simone des Forest, (7 March 1910 in Royan – 15 November 2004 in Vichy) was a French racing driver. She was one of the first women to obtain a driving license in France, in 1929, and competed in automobile races from 1930. Her name is also the origin of a popular French expression: "En voiture Simone!" ("In the car Simone!").

== Biography ==
The Pinet de Borde des Forest family, from Nivernais, is descended from Jean Pinet de Borde des Forest (1688–1758), a French military officer. Another family member, Jean Daniel Pinet de Borde-Desforêts (1742–1801) was a brigadier general and knight.

Des Forest was born in Royan in 1910, to wealthy parents. Her father was a cavalry captain and she spent the first part of her life at the Château de Fontorte, near Gannat, in south-east Allier.

She obtained her driving license in 1929, at the age of 19 years, from the first French driving school specifically for women, founded in Versailles a year earlier by Suzanne Amélie Meyer. This made her one of the first French women to obtain a license (previously, a certificate of capacity for driving vehicles was required and was awarded to many women, including the Duchess of Uzès in 1898, and Marie Curie in 1916). A year after her license, she took part in her first motorsports event, the La Baraque hill climb near Clermont-Ferrand. She then began a career as a professional racing driver participating in numerous car races and rallies until 1957, without having a single accident during her career.

In 1931, she participated in the Paris-Vichy race, for which her mother was her co-driver. In 1934, she competed in the Monte-Carlo Rally with her friend Fernande Hustinx at the wheel of a Peugeot 301. Starting from Bucharest, Romania, the two women reached Monaco after a journey of 3,772 kilometres (2,344 mi) and many adventures, recounted in a travel diary kept and illustrated by des Forest. The two women won the Ladies' Cup.

In the 1935 Monte-Carlo Rally, in partnership with Odette Siko, she finished third in the Ladies' Cup at the wheel of a Triumph (36th overall with a small engine: 1.232 L compared to more than 3 L for the first two in the Ladies' Cup).

Driving again with Siko in 1937, as well as with Hellé Nice and Claire Descollas, she carried out speed tests from 19 to 29 May on the Autodrome de Montlhéry, with Yacco motor oils as sponsor. Under the leadership of Odette Siko, and despite the reported hostility of des Forest and Descollas towards Nice, the quartet broke 25 world records, some of which still stand today.

During the Second World War, she drove trucks for the Red Cross. Subsequently, she participated in the French truck championship, which she finished in 10th place. Admired by racing driver Fangio, she later devoted herself to civil aviation. She was also one of the first women to open a driving school in 1950, where she taught for 25 years.

== Personal life ==
She married Ernest Bernard in 1973, at the age of 63, and died on 15 November 2004 at the age of 94. She had no children.

== Popular expression "En voiture Simone!" ==
Her name is associated with a popular French language expression: "En voiture Simone!" ("Get in the car, Simone!"), with the meaning of "Let's go!", of which there was first a longer version: "En voiture Simone, c'est toi qui conduis, c'est moi qui klaxonne!" ("Get in the car, Simone, it's you who drives, it's me who honks!").

The short version of this expression was greatly popularized by the TV game show Intervilles, broadcast on RTF from 1962. Guy Lux and Léon Zitrone, two famous presenters of the time, hosted the show, each more or less faithfully defending the colors of the two towns that competed against each other in various events. A third presenter, Simone Garnier, was in charge of refereeing the two sides. The expression "En voiture Simone!" was addressed to her during the show. Guy Lux ensured a resurgence in popularity for this line, which is often claimed to have originated with him, although it actually predates him.
