= 1953 Carrera Panamericana =

Racing event

The 1953 Carrera Panamericana was the fourth running of the Carrera Panamericana Mexican sports car racing event, and the first edition as a part of the World Sportscar Championship. The race took place from 19–23 November, and was run from Tuxtla Gutiérrez, Chiapas, to Ciudad Juárez, Chihuahua, over 8 stages and 3,077 kilometres (1,912 mi). 182 cars started the race, and 60 finished all 8 stages.

== Pre-race ==
For the 1953 race, the existing Sports and Stock classes were both subdivided into Large and Small groups, giving four categories in which to compete. These were split by engine capacity; sports cars were divided under and over 1600 cc (98 ci), and stock cars under and over 3500 cc (213.5 ci). This was to accommodate the huge number of participants and the diverse breeds of cars within the race.

Going into the race, Ferrari had a slender championship lead of just two points over Jaguar. Although neither manufacturer had sent work entries to Mexico, the title could still be snatched by the Coventry marque, despite the Italian marque having more cars in the event.

== Race ==
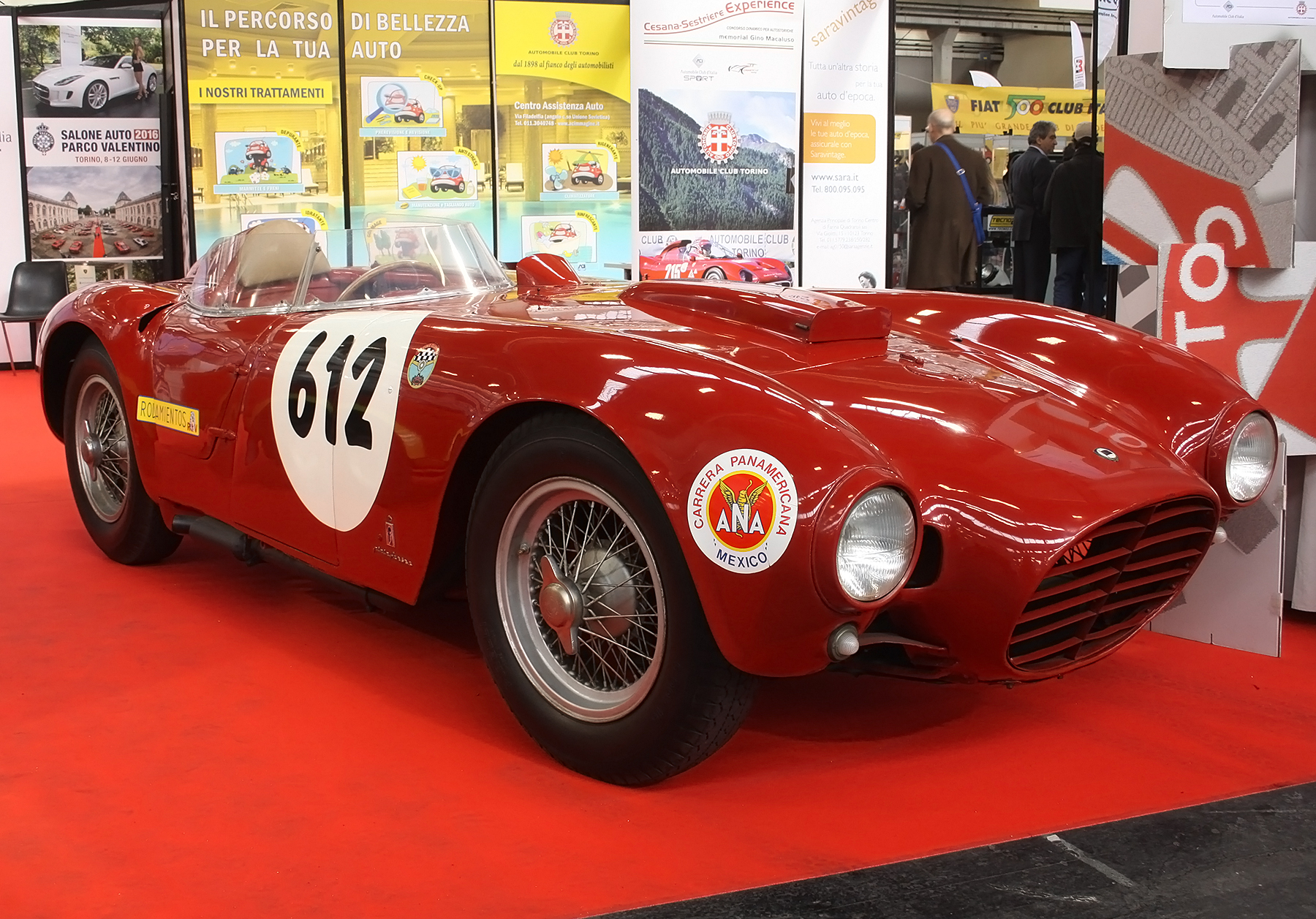
The race was won by a Lancia D24, similar to that pictured

Both Lancia and Lincoln came to the race highly organized and both factories swept 1–2–3 finishes in their respective categories. The Europeans dominated the sports categories, and the Americans the stock. Large Sports Cars was won by Juan Manuel Fangio of Argentina and Gino Bronzoni of Italy in a Lancia D24 Pinin Farina, Small Sports Cars by José Herrarte Ariano and Carlos González from Guatemala in a Porsche 550 Coupé. Large Stock Cars was won by Chuck Stevenson and Clay Smith of the United States in a Lincoln Capri and Small Stock Cars by C.D. Evans and Walter Krause, Jr., also of the U.S., in a six-cylinder Chevrolet 210. Stevenson has the distinction of being the only person to ever win twice in the original race.

The race was marred by the death of a number of competitors. The co-driver and pacenote systems championed by the Mercedes-Benz teams of the previous year were vindicated by the failure of an alternative system used by some other works drivers, notably those of Lancia. During pre-race runs of the route at much safer speeds, Felice Bonetto and Piero Taruffi, winner of the 1951 edition of the race, painted warning signals on the road to remind themselves of particular hazards. This resulted in the death of Bonetto who, leading the race under pressure from Taruffi, missed his own warning signs. Entering the village of Silao, he encountered rough pavement at excessive speed and impacted a building, killing him instantly.

As a result of Guido Mancini and Fabrizio Serena di Lapigio finishing in fourth place, in their Ferrari 375 MM Pinin Farina Berlinetta, they secured three points for Ferrari, thereby increasing the Maranello marque points lead over Jaguar, giving them the 1953 World Championship for Manufacturer title.

The race was held over eight stages over a total distance of 1,912 miles. Fangio and Bronzoni won in their works-entered Lancia D24 Pinin Farina. The pair finished the race in 18 hours and 11 minutes, averaging 169.221 kilometres per hour (105.149 mph). Second place went to their teammates, Piero Taruffi and Luigi Maggio, in their D24, just 7:51 minutes behind. The podium was complete by another of the Scuderia Lancia cars that of Eugenio Castellotti, with his co-driver, Carlo Luoni, in their Lancia D23, over 6:01 minutes adrift.

== Official Classification ==
Class Winners are in Bold text.

Pos	Class	No.	Entrant	Driver(s)	Car	Stages	Time
1	**S+1.6**	**36**	**Scuderia Lancia**	**(Argentina) Juan Manuel Fangio** **(Italy) Gino Bronzoni**	**Lancia D24 Pinin Farina**	**8**	**18:11:00**
2	S+1.6	22	Scuderia Lancia	(Italy) Piero Taruffi (Italy) Luigi Maggio	Lancia D24 Pinin Farina	8	18:18:51
3	S+1.6	38	Scuderia Lancia	(Italy) Eugenio Castellotti (Italy) Carlo Luoni	Lancia D23 Pinin Farina	8	18:24:52
4	S+1.6	26	Scuderia Guastalla	(Italy) Guido Mancini (Italy) Fabrizio Serena di Lapigio	Ferrari 375 MM Pinin Farina Berlinetta	8	19:40:29
5	S+1.6	6	Club Francia Amigos de la Panamericana	(France) Louis Rosier	Talbot-Lago T26GS	8	20:11:22
6	S+1.6	23	Scuderia Guastalla	(Italy) Mario Ricci (Italy) Forese Salviati	Ferrari 375 MM Pinin Farina Berlinetta	8	20:16:28
7	**T**	**52**	**Bob Estes**	**(United States) Chuck Stevenson** **(United States) Clay Smith**	**Lincoln Capri**	**8**	**20:31:32**
8	T	53	Bob Estes	(United States) Walt Faulkner (United States) Chuck Daigh	Lincoln Capri	8	20:32:55
9	T	95	Ronald Ferguson	(United States) Jack McGrath (United States) Manuel Ayulo	Lincoln Capri	8	20:33:07
10	T	51	Bob Estes	(United States) Johnny Mantz (United States) Bill Stroppe	Lincoln Capri	8	20:33:30
11	S+1.6	5	Efraín Ruiz Echeverría	(Mexico) Efraín Ruiz Echeverría (Mexico) Pedro Villegas Becerril	Ferrari 250 MM Pinin Farina	8	20:48:29
12	T	66	A. B. Poe	(United States) Tommy Drisdale (United States) Johnny Gomez	Chrysler New Yorker	8	21:21:19
13	T	67	Knox Converse	(United States) Royal Russell (United States) Jesse Ashley	Chrysler New Yorker	8	21:34:26
14	S+1.6	11	Akton Miller	(United States) Ak Miller (United States) Douglas Harrison	Caballo de Hiero-Oldsmobile	8	22:07:36
15	T	60	Oscar Alfredo Gálvez	(Argentina) Oscar Alfredo Gálvez (Argentina) Eduardo Martínez	Lincoln Capri	8	22:18:44
16	T	79	Jorge Descote	(Argentina) Jorge Descote	Lincoln Capri	8	22:27:01
17	T	64	E. N. de Milo	(Argentina) Ernesto Petrini (Argentina) Alberto Fiorentini	Lincoln Capri	8	22:28:36
18	T	59	Douglas Ehlinger	(United States) Douglas Ehlinger (Mexico) Luis Solorio	Packard Mayfair	8	22:34:40
19	T	72	Thomas A. Deal	(United States) Bill Sterling (United States) Julius L. Colspret	Cadillac Series 62	8	22:40:30
20	T	93	Pat Zoccano	(United States) Pat Zoccano (United States) Glen N. Barnhart	Buick	8	22:42:21
21	T	55	Union de Choferes	(Mexico) Roberto Belmar (Mexico) Angel Acar Valle	DeSoto Diplomat	8	22:45:02
22	T	101	Arturo Alvarez Tostado	(Mexico) Arturo Alvarez Tostado (Mexico) Alfredo Cabrero Porras	Chrysler New Yorker	8	22:50:59
23	T	118	James Rice	(Mexico) Ferdinando de Leeuw Murphy (Mexico) Cornelio Medina	Lincoln Capri	8	22:51:28
24	T	113	Ricardo Ramirez	(Mexico) Ricardo Ramírez	Oldsmobile 88	8	23:01:10
25	S+1.6	25	Guillermo Girón	(Guatemala) Guillermo Girón (Guatemala) Rodolfo Beaudin	Jaguar XK120	8	23:01:49
26	T	102	Juan de Aguinaco	(Mexico) Juan de Aguinaco	Oldsmobile 88	8	23:02:47
27	T	70	Al Rogers	(United States) Al Rogers (United States) Ralph Rogers	Chrysler New Yorker	8	23:13:45
28	T	88	Ernest C. Hall	(United States) Ernest C. Hall (United States) Louis Unser	Buick	8	23:14:35
29	T	87	Luis Rafael Garzon	(Colombia) Luis Rafael Garzon (Colombia) William Griebling	Oldsmobile 88	8	23:28:15
30	T	114	Hector Rivapalacio	(Mexico) Hector Riva Palacio (Mexico) Juan Courtney	Oldsmobile 88	8	23:28:20
31	T	82	Gilberto Julian Riega	(Argentina) Gilberto Julian Riega (Mexico) Modesto Jose Riega	Lincoln Capri	8	23:55:50
32	**S1.6**	**152**	**José Herrarte Ariano**	**(Guatemala) José Sala Herrarte Ariano** **(Guatemala) Carlos A. González**	**Porsche 550 Coupé**	**8**	**23:57:04**
33	S1.6	158		(Argentina) Fernando Segura	Porsche 356 Super	8	24:18:25
34	**TS**	**217**	**C. D. Evans**	**(United States) C. D. Evans** **(United States) Walter Krause, Jr.**	**Chevrolet 210**	**8**	**24:48:21**
35	TS	207	Norman Patterson	(United States) Norman Patterson (United States) Bernie Shires	Ford V8	8	24:58:55
36	TS	209	Oscar Cabalen	(Argentina) Oscar Cabalén (Argentina) Guillermo Ibanda	Ford 6	8	25:03:48
37	TS	259	Scott F. Yantis	(United States) Scott F. Yantis	Chevrolet 210	8	25:09:51
38	TS	235	Malcolm Eckart	(United States) Malcolm Eckart (United States) Carroll Hamplemann	Hudson Jet	8	25:17:05
39	TS	238	Humberto Maneglia	(Argentina) Humberto Maneglia	Ford 6	8	25:34:27
40	TS	222	Hector Ortiz Palacios	(Mexico) Hector Ortiz Palacios (Mexico) Ramon Leal Contreras	Plymouth Belvedere	8	25:53:31
41	TS	204	Segurs Chapultepec	(Mexico) Francisco Ramirez Fonseca (Mexico) Alberto Maya Juarez	Hudson Jet	8	25:59:48
42	TS	225	Enrique Paredes	(Mexico) Enrique Paredes (Mexico) Luis Herrastri	Hudson Jet	8	26:00:42
43	TS	245	Tadeo Taddia	(Argentina) Tadeo Taddia (Argentina) Sebastian Florencio	Chevrolet 210	8	26:01:53
44	TS	268	Miguel Vinardell	(Argentina) Miguel Vinardell	Chevrolet Bel Air	8	26:03:33
45	TS	256	Baltazar Alaimo	(Argentina) Baltazar Alaimo (Argentina) Eliseo Rodriguez	Chevrolet 210	8	26:04:08
46	T	147	Clemente Aspe	(Argentina) Clemente Aspe	Mercury Monterey	8	26:05:44
47	TS	282	Rafael Larocca	(Argentina) Rafael Larocca	Ford 6	8	26:06:05
48	TS	210	Morelos	(Mexico) Carlos Diaz Garcilazo (Mexico) Enrique Alvarado	Studebaker Champion	8	26:10:36
49	TS	228	Luis Maria Martorani	(Argentina) Luis Maria Martorani	Ford Victoria	8	26:11:56
50	TS	244	Guillermo G. Airaldi	(Argentina) Guillermo G. Airaldi (Argentina) Francisco Spatafora	Chevrolet 210	8	26:25:21
51	TS	258	Domingo B. Lombardi	(Argentina) Domingo B. Lombardi (Argentina) Jorge Jose Ferrario	Ford 6	8	26:27:41
52	TS	277	Robert E. Barckimer	(United States) Robert E. Barckimer (United States) Frank Danley	Ford 6	8	26:40:39
53	TS	215	Leones Doroles Club, Hidalgo	(Mexico) Rafael González Sandoval (Mexico) Aurelio Lara	Nash Statesman	8	26:54:23
54	TS	272	Carlos Fortunati Firpo	(Argentina) Carlos Fortunati Firpo	Ford 6	8	27:00:50
55	TS	276	Oscar Martorani	(Argentina) Oscar Martorani	Ford 6	8	27:01:13
56	TS	248	Carlos Pfeffer	(Argentina) Carlos Pfeffer (Argentina) Antonio Luís Michelini	Ford 6	8	28:07:55
57	TS	278	Carlos Battilana Olazabal	(Argentina) Carlos Battilana Olazabal	Ford 6	8	28:14:19
58	TS	255	Guillermo Marenghini	(Argentina) Guillermo Marenghini (Argentina) Alfred Rho	Chevrolet	8	28:24:41
59	TS	227	Sebastian Gonzalez	(Mexico) Sebastián González (Mexico) Carlos Soto Olivares	Ford Victoria	8	28:27:21
60	TS	257	Omar Nestor Bide White	(Argentina) Omar Nestor Bide White	Chevrolet 210	8	30:53:14
61 NC	S1.6	155	Hans Hugo Hartmann	(Germany) Hans Hugo Hartmann	Borgward Hansa 1500 RS	8	Over time limit
62 DNF	S1.6	154	Jaroslav Juhan	(Guatemala) Jaroslav Juhan (Guatemala) Antonio Asturias Hall	Porsche 550 Coupé	7	Mechanical
63 DNF	S1.6	162	Manfredo Lippmann	(Guatemala) Manfredo Lippmann	Porsche 356 Super	7	Mechanical
64 DNF	TS	218	Remo Gamalero	(Argentina) Remo Gamalero (Argentina) Juan Carlos Domínguez	Ford 6	7	Mechanical
65 DNF	TS	269	Mario Reibaldi	(Argentina) Mario Reibaldi	Ford 6	7	Over time limit
66 DNF	TS	271	Jorge Daponte	(Argentina) Jorge Daponte	Chevrolet 210	7	Mechanical
67 DNF	T	63	Liga Nacional del Transporte	(Mexico) Luis Leal Solares (Mexico) Alfredo Garcia Avila	Lincoln Capri	6	Over time limit
68 DNF	TS	233	Andres Ferreno Barreiro	(Argentina) Andres Ferreno Barreiro (Argentina) Juan Carlos Suárez	Ford 6	6	DNF
69 DNF	TS	262	Agustin Aguaviva	(Argentina) Agustin Aguaviva	Ford 6	6	DNF
70 DNF	S+1.6	9	O'Farrill	(France) Jean Trévoux (France) Jean Bachereaux	Packard Motto Special	5	DNF
71 DNF	T	57	E. Carl Kiekhaefer	(United States) Frank Menendez (United States) James E. Beake	Chrysler New Yorker	5	Over time limit
72 DNF	S1.6	151	Calzado Canada	(Mexico) Salvador López Chávez	Porsche 356	5	Engine
73 DNF	TS	212	Douglas Marimon	(Argentina) Douglas Marimon	Ford 6	5	DNF
74 DNF	TS	240	Vincente Tirabasso	(Argentina) Vincente Tirabasso	Chevrolet	5	DNF
75 DNF	TS	254	Angel Lovalvo	(Argentina) Angel Lovalvo (Argentina) Antonio Spampinato	Ford Victoria	5	DNF
76 DNF	S+1.6	7	Club Francia Amigos de la Panamericana	(France) Jean Behra	Gordini T24S	4	Accident
77 DNF	S+1.6	8	Club Francia Amigos de la Panamericana	(France) Jean Lucas	Gordini T16S	4	Over time limit
78 DNF	S+1.6	12	Scuderia Guastalla	(Italy) Umberto Maglioli (Italy) Piero Cassani	Ferrari 375 MM Pinin Farina Berlinetta	4	Lost wheel, accident
79 DNF	S1.6	153	Guillermo Suhr	(Guatemala) Guillermo Suhr Contreras (Guatemala) Oscar Alfonso	Porsche 356	4	Over time limit (Accident)
80 DNF	TS	280	Jose Brea	(Argentina) Jose Brea (Argentina) Alfonso Moreno	Ford 6	4	DNF
81 DNF	S+1.6	34	Scuderia Lancia	(Italy) Felice Bonetto	Lancia D24 Pinin Farina	3	Fatal accident
82 DNF	S+1.6	50	Scuderia Lancia	(Italy) Giovanni Bracco	Lancia D23 Pinin Farina	3	Accident
83 DNF	T	61	Philips Radio Mexico	(Mexico) Felix Cerda Loza (Mexico) José Aguilar	Lincoln Capri	3	Engine
84 DNF	T	80	Hayes/McNamamra	(United States) Keith Andrews (United States) Pete Woods, Jr.	Cadillac Series 62	3	DNF
85 DNF	T	149	Ray Crawford	(United States) Ray Crawford	Lincoln Capri	3	Engine
86 DNF	TS	221	Manuel Hidalgo	(Argentina) Manuel Hidalgo (Argentina) Luis Bicio	Ford 6	3	DNF
87 DNF	TS	223	Jose Rubiol Roca	(Argentina) Jose Rubiol Roca	Ford 6	3	Engine
88 DNF	TS	239	Daniel Musso	(Argentina) Daniel Musso	Ford 6	3	DNF
89 DNF	TS	241	Manuel Cobas	(Argentina) Manuel Cobas	Ford 6	3	DNF
90 DNF	TS	247	Ricardo Julian Manrique	(Argentina) Ricardo Julian Manrique	Chevrolet	3	DNF
91 DNF	TS	252	Fernando Tirabasso	(Argentina) Fernando Tirabasso (Argentina) Antonio Vidal	Ford Victoria	3	DNF
92 DNF	TS	253	Hugo Servetto	(Argentina) Hugo Servetto (Argentina) Francisco Vega Monroy	Ford Victoria	3	DNF
93 DNF	TS	286	Ruben J. Joly	(Argentina) Ruben J. Joly	Chevrolet	3	DNF
94 DNF	TS	288	Eugenio Veicier	(Argentina) Eugenio Veicier (Argentina) Alfonso Hernandez	Chevrolet 210	3	Accident
95 DNF	TS	300	Anza Hermanos	(Mexico) Rogelio Anza (Mexico) Ricardo Pola	Ford 6	3	Accident
96 DNF	S+1.6	4	Allen Guiberson	(United States) Phil Hill (United States) Richie Ginther	Ferrari 340 Mexico Vignale Coupé	2	Accident
97 DNF	S+1.6	21	Tony Bettenhausen	(United States) Tony Bettenhausen (United States) Duane Carter (United States) Murrell Belanger	Kurtis-Chrysler KK500S	2	Over time limit (Electrical)
98 DNF	S+1.6	45	Scuderia Guastalla	(United States) Luigi Chinetti (Spain) Alfonso de Portago	Ferrari 375 MM Vignale Spyder	2	Over time limit (Engine)
99 DNF	T	89	Universidad Militar	(Mexico) Otto Becker Estrada (Mexico) Marcel Carrel	Oldsmobile 88	2	DNF
100 DNF	T	97	Mario Andreini	(Argentina) Mario Andreini	Mercury Monterey	2	Over time limit
101 DNF	T	150	Charles Royal	(United States) Charles Royal (United States) George Clark	Cadillac Series 62	2	DNF
102 DNF	S1.6	159	Dr. Ing. Porsche K.G.	(Germany) Karl Kling	Porsche 550 Spyder	2	Drive shaft
103 DNF	S1.6	160	Dr. Ing. Porsche K.G.	(Germany) Hans Herrmann	Porsche 550 Spyder	2	Steering arm, accident
104 DNF	S1.6	165	William Doheny	(United States) Ernie McAfee (United States) George Metger	Siata 208s	2	DNF
105 DNF	TS	219	Juan Fernando Piersanti	(Argentina) Juan Fernando Piersanti (Argentina) Oscar Piersanti	Chevrolet	2	DNF
106 DNF	TS	243	Osvaldo Jose Mantega	(Argentina) Osvaldo Jose Mantega (Argentina) Ernesto Nunez	Chevrolet 210	2	DNF
107 DNF	TS	251	Arnaldo de Tomas	(Argentina) Arnaldo de Tomas	Ford Victoria	2	DNF
108 DNF	S+1.6	1	Robredo	(Mexico) Fernando Razo Maciel (Mexico) Javier Montes de Oca	Chrysler New Yorker Special	1	Engine
109 DNF	S+1.6	10	José Antonio Solana	(Mexico) José Antonio Solana (Mexico) Alfonso Iniesta	Solana–Oldsmobile	1	DNF
110 DNF	S+1.6	13	Javier Razo Maciel	(Mexico) Oscar Fano Bush (Mexico) Raul Aurelio Martinez	Glasspar –Mercury	1	Over time limit
111 DNF	S+1.6	14	Fernando Dujan Mejia	(Mexico) Fernando Dujan Mejia (Mexico) Antonio Mucharras	Cadillac	1	Over time limit
112 DNF	S+1.6	16	E. Carl Kiekhaefer	(United States) John Fitch (United States) Bud Boile	Chrysler New Yorker Special	1	Over time limit
113 DNF	S+1.6	35	Jose Ham Gunam	(Mexico) Jose Ham Gunam (Mexico) Armando Santamaria	Ham Special	1	Over time limit
114 DNF	T	54	Fernando Carriles Pagaza	(Mexico) Fernando Carriles Pagaza (Mexico) Jorge Goudet	Lincoln Capri	1	Over time limit
115 DNF	T	56	E. Carl Kiekhaefer	(United States) Bob Korf (United States) Don Ziebell	Chrysler New Yorker	1	DNF
116 DNF	T	58	Vinilsa	(Mexico) Vladimiro Cheterquin Olanque (Mexico) Martin Pecastaing	Cadillac Series 62	1	Over time limit
117 DNF	T	69	H. W. Dietrich	(United States) Rodger Ward (United States) Miles Spickler	Lincoln Capri	1	Accident
118 DNF	T	92	Edward Stringer	(United States) Edward A. Stringer (United States) David C. Stringer	Cadillac Series 62	1	DNF
119 DNF	T	96	Arquimedes A. del Saz	(Argentina) Arquimedes A. del Saz	Mercury Monterey	1	Over time limit
120 DNF	T	99	William Toia	(United States) Duane Carter	Lincoln Capri	1	DNF
121 DNF	T	103	Juan Jose Courtney	(Mexico) Juan Jose Courtney (Mexico) Carlos Zambrano	Oldsmobile 88	1	DNF
122 DNF	T	121	Alianza Camioneres de Mexico	(Mexico) Abelardo Matamoros Acosta (Mexico) Raul Blancas	Lincoln Capri	1	DNF
123 DNF	S1.6	199	Joaquin Castillo de la Fuente	(Uruguay) Joaquin Castillo de la Fuente	Porsche 356 SL	1	Over time limit
124 DNF	S1.6	200	Jacqueline Evans de López	(United Kingdom) Jacqueline Evans	Porsche 356	1	Over time limit
125 DNF	TS	201	Carlos Rogelio Anza	(Mexico) Octavio Anza Esquivel (Mexico) Ricardo Anza	Ford V-8	1	DNF
126 DNF	TS	202	Bonos del Ahorro Nacional	(Mexico) Guillermo Albafull; Billey Saidel	Ford V-8	1	DNF
127 DNF	TS	205	Jose Antonio Marin	(Mexico) Jose Antonio Marin (Mexico) Miguel Lecuona	Plymouth Belvedere	1	DNF
128 DNF	TS	208	A. B. Poe	(United States) Frank Davis (United States) Dennis Cannon	Plymouth Belvedere	1	DNF
129 DNF	TS	211	Dario Ramonda	(Argentina) Dario Ramonda (Argentina) Armando Lopez	Ford 6	1	Over time limit
130 DNF	TS	214	Chiapas	(Mexico) Carlos Alvarado Castanon (Mexico) Luis Ascencio Cordero	Studebaker Champion	1	DNF
131 DNF	TS	229	Alberto Augusto Crespo	(Argentina) Alberto Augusto Crespo (Argentina) Jacinto Alvarez	Ford Victoria	1	DNF
132 DNF	TS	236	Roberto Salmon Corona	(Mexico) Roberto Salmon Corona (Mexico) Jorge Sojo Guzman	Ford V-8	1	DNF
133 DNF	TS	249	Pedro Beamonte	(Argentina) Pedro Beamonte (Argentina) Francisco R. Rodriguez	Ford 6	1	DNF
134 DNF	TS	250	Kaiser Mexico	(Mexico) Manuel Luz Meneses	Kaiser Manhattan	1	DNF
135 DNF	TS	261	Carlos Maria Silva Ferrer	(Argentina) Carlos Maria Silva Ferrer	Ford 6	1	DNF
136 DNF	TS	265	Ramon Enrique Bauzada	(Argentina) Ramon Enrique Bauzada	Ford 6	1	DNF
137 DNF	TS	273	Marcelo Alos Vercher	(Argentina) Marcelo Alos Vercher	Chevrolet 210	1	DNF
138 DNF	TS	279	Constante Luis Mundo	(Argentina) Constante Luis Mundo	Chevrolet 210	1	DNF
139 DNF	TS	295	Benito Flores Estavillo	(Mexico) Benito Flores Estavillo (Mexico) Manuel Calzadillas Vega	Ford 6	1	Over time limit
140 DNF	TS	296	Carlos Buenaventura Perez	(Mexico) Carlos Buenaventura Perez (Mexico) Guillermo Romero	Mercury Monterey	1	DNF
141 DNF	S+1.6	3	Owen Gray	(United States) Owen Gray (United States) E. J. Elliason	Chrysler New Yorker Special	0	Mechanical
142 DNF	S+1.6	15	Scuderia Guastalla	(Italy) Antonio Stagnoli (Italy) Giuseppe Scotuzzi	Ferrari 375 MM Pinin Farina Berlinetta	0	Fatal accident
143 DNF	S+1.6	17	Jack Ensley	(United States) Jack Ensley (United States) Stephen Spitler	Kurtis-Cadillac KK500S	0	Out of fuel
144 DNF	S+1.6	18	Francisco Ibarra	(Mexico) Francisco Ibarra	Jaguar C-Type	0	DNF
145 DNF	S+1.6	19	Jorge Moctezuma	(Mexico) Jorge Moctezuma (Mexico) Antonio Ferreira	Ford V-8	0	Accident
146 DNF	S+1.6	20	E. Carl Kiekhaefer	(United States) Reginald McFee (United States) George Thompson	Chrysler New Yorker Special	0	Accident
147 DNF	T	65	Hilton Motors	(United States) Bill Vukovich (United States) Vern Houle	Lincoln Capri	0	Gearbox
148 DNF	T	74	Raimundo Corona Illescas	(Mexico) Raymundo Corona (Mexico) Jesus Martin del Campo	Packard Mayfair	0	Accident
149 DNF	T	75	Aldredo Macias	(Argentina) Aldredo Macias (Argentina) Rodolfo Hugo	Mercury Monterey	0	Mechanical
150 DNF	T	83	Rudolph Ryans	(United States) Rudolph Ryans	Lincoln Capri	0	Fire
151 DNF	T	85	Jacobo Muniele Falick	(Argentina) Jacobo Muniele Falick	Lincoln Capri	0	Mechanical
152 DNF	T	148	Hugo Aspe	(Argentina) Hugo Aspe (Argentina) Ancieto T. Aspe	Mercury Monterey	0	Accident
153 DNF	S1.6	156	Adolf Brudes	(Germany) Adolf Brudes	Borgward Hansa 1500 RS	0	Accident
154 DNF	S1.6	157	Jacques Péron	(France) Jacques Péron	O.S.C.A. MT4 1100	0	Tyres
155 DNF	TS	203	Morelos	(Mexico) Olegario Perez Pliego (Mexico) Guillermo Estrada	Studebaker Champion	0	Accident
156 DNF	TS	213	Alfonso Cesar Franc—o	(Mexico) Alfonso Cesar Franco (Mexico) Jose Hernández	Ford 6	0	Accident
157 DNF	TS	216	Antonio Adrian Zarantonello	(Argentina) Antonio Adrian Zarantonello	Ford 6	0	Accident
158 DNF	TS	220	Ramiro Aguilar, Jr.	(Mexico) Ramiro Aguilar, Jr. (Mexico) Joe Blanco	Chevrolet 210	0	Accident
159 DNF	TS	224	Surroz Ford	(United States) Bob Christie (United States) Kenneth M. Wood	Ford 6	0	Accident
160 DNF	TS	226	Alberto August	(United States) Mickey Thompson (United States) Rodger Flores	Ford 6	0	Accident
161 DNF	TS	230	Ernesto Nanni	(Argentina) Ernesto Nanni	Chevrolet	0	Mechanical
162 DNF	TS	232	Alfredo Cogorno	(Argentina) Alfredo Cogorno	Ford 6	0	Mechanical
163 DNF	TS	234	Radio 620	(Mexico) Oscar Cepeda (Mexico) Luis Pombo Rivadeneyra	Willys Aero	0	Accident
164 DNF	TS	242	Nestor Luis Lafage	(Argentina) Nestor Luis Lafage	Ford 6	0	Mechanical
165 DNF	TS	246	Adolfo Sogolo	(Argentina) Adolfo Sogolo	Ford Victoria	0	Mechanical
166 DNF	TS	266	Mario Jorge de Poli	(Argentina) Mario Jorge de Poli	Ford 6	0	Mechanical
167 DNF	TS	267	Jorge Pedro Castellano	(Argentina) Jorge Pedro Castellano	Ford 6	0	Mechanical
168 DNF	TS	270	Radio 620	(Mexico) Jorge Cepeda Mier y Teran (Mexico) Heron Cabrera	Willys Aero	0	Mechanical
169 DNF	TS	275	Miguel Gustavo Molinero	(Argentina) Miguel Gustavo Molinero	Ford 6	0	Mechanical
170 DNF	TS	285	Francisco Casuscelli	(Argentina) Francisco Casuscelli	Plymouth Belvedere	0	Mechanical
181 DNF	TS	290	Federico Herrero	(Argentina) Federico Herrero	Ford 6	0	Mechanical
182 DSQ	T	73	Richard D. Doane	(United States) Jim Rathmann (United States) Irving Kirbell	Oldsmobile 88	8	21:16:47/Illegal heads

=== Class Winners ===
Class	Winners		
Sport Internacional	36	Lancia D24 Pinin Farina	Fangio / Bronzoni
Tourismo Internacional	52	Lincoln Capri	Stevenson / Smith
Sport hasta 1600 cc	152	Porsche 550 Coupé	Gonzalez / Herrarte Arinao
Tourismo Especial	217	Chevrolet 210	Evans / Krause, Jr.

== Standings after the race ==
Pos	Championship	Points
1	(Italy) Ferrari	27 (30)
2	(United Kingdom) Jaguar	24 (28)
3	(United Kingdom) Aston Martin	16
4=	(United States) Cunningham	12
4=	(Italy) Lancia	12

- Note: Only the top five positions are included in this set of standings. Championship points were awarded for the first six places in each race in the order of 8-6-4-3-2-1. Manufacturers were only awarded points for their highest finishing car with no points awarded for positions filled by additional cars. Only the best 4 results out of the 7 races could be retained by each manufacturer. Points earned but not counted towards the championship totals are listed within brackets in the above table.

World Sportscar Championship
Previous race: RAC Tourist Trophy	1953 season	Next race: 1000km Buenos Aires (1954)
