= Solana =

Solana is the Spanish word for the "sunny side" of a mount or valley. It may refer to:

== Places ==
- La Solana, a municipality in Castile-La Mancha, Spain
- Solana, Cagayan, a municipality in the Philippines
- Solana de Ávila, a municipality in Castile and León, Spain
- Solana de los Barros, a municipality in Badajoz, Extremadura, Spain
- Solana de Rioalmar, a municipality in Castile and León, Spain
- Solana del Pino, a village in Ciudad Real, Spain
- Solana, Florida, United States
- Solana State Forest, Minnesota United States; see List of Minnesota state forests
- Solana Beach, California, United States
- Solana Beach station, an Amtrak station in Solana Beach, California
- Solana, the main galaxy in the Ratchet & Clank series that Ratchet and Clank are from.
- Solana Valley, a valley in Aragon, Spain

== Other uses ==
- Solana (surname)
- Solana (automobile), a Mexican cottage manufacturer of sporting cars
- Solana (blockchain platform)
- Solana, the female protagonist of the Pokémon Ranger video game
- Solána Imani Rowe (born 1989), American singer known professionally as SZA
- The Groovy Girls doll line, by Manhattan Toy, features a doll named Solana

== See also ==
- Solana Generating Station, a solar power plant in Arizona, United States
- Solano (disambiguation)
