= Museo Mille Miglia =

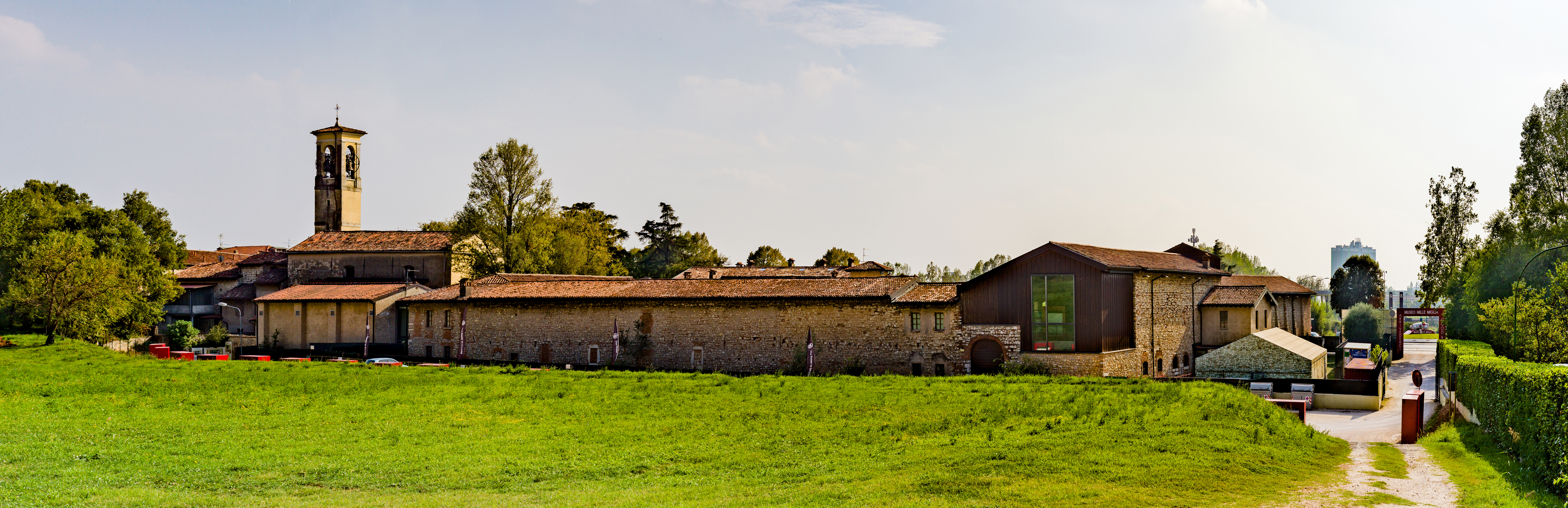
- The northern side of the museum.
- Established: 10 November 2004; 21 years ago
- Location: Via della Rimembranza, 3, Brescia, Lombardy, Italy
- Coordinates: 45.524639°N 10.267187°E
- Type: Automobile museum
- Website: www.museomillemiglia.it/en/

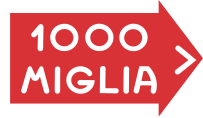
Mille Miglia road sign

The Museo Mille Miglia is an automobile museum founded on 10 November 2004 at the initiative of the Automobile Club of Brescia and of some private enthusiasts of the famous Mille Miglia race. It is located in the ancient monastery of St. Euphemia in Via delle Rimembranze in Brescia, and more precisely on the outside of the neighborhood is Saint Euphemia.

The route is divided into nine sections of time, seven dedicated to the Mille Miglia races from 1927 to 1957, one at Mille Miglia from 1958 to 1961 and one at the Mille Miglia contemporanea, and in each of these sections there are historic cars, periodically replaced to allow their participation in various historic car racing, including Mille Miglia.

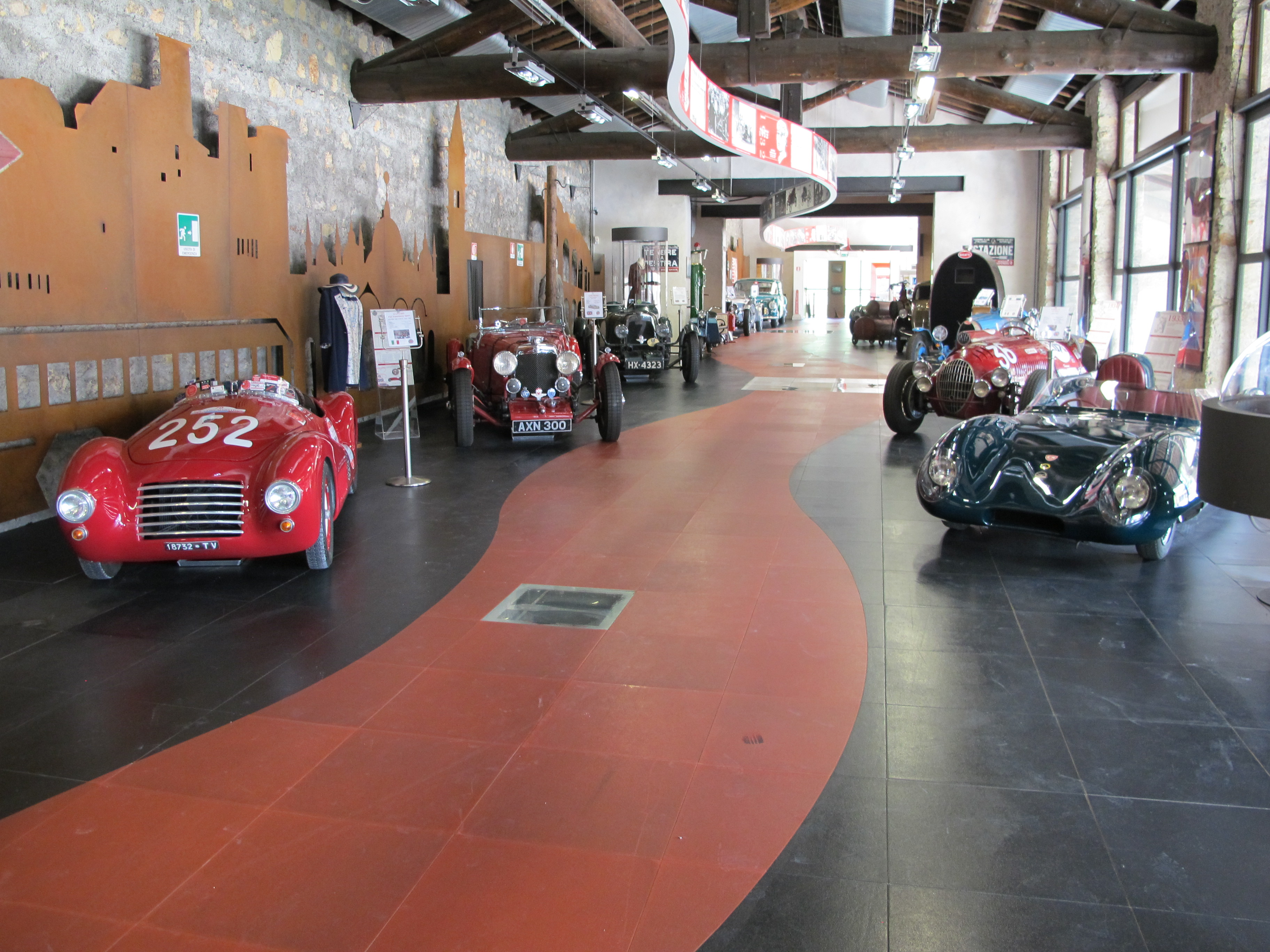
Interior of the museum

== See also ==
- Alfa Romeo Museum
- Museo Casa Enzo Ferrari
- Museo Ferrari
- Museo Nazionale dell'Automobile
- Museo Lamborghini
- Museo Vincenzo Lancia
- List of automobile museums
