= Lancia D24 =

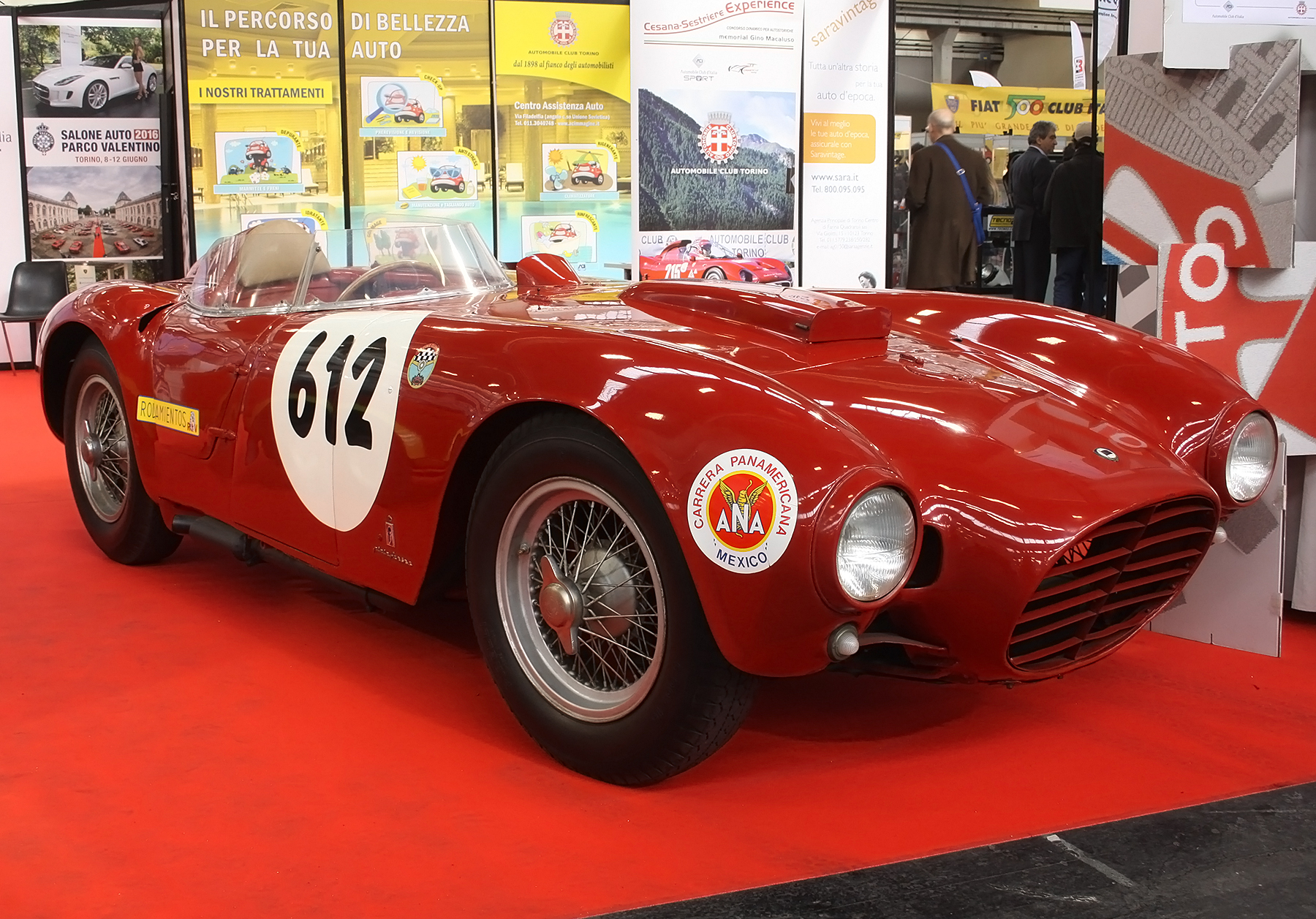
- Constructor: Lancia
- Predecessor: Lancia D23
- Successor: Lancia D25

Technical specifications
- Chassis: Steel multi-tubular frame
- Suspension (front): Double wishbones, transverse leaf spring, hydraulic dampers
- Suspension (rear): De Dion tube, transverse leaf spring, hydraulic dampers
- Wheelbase: 2,400 mm (94.5 in)
- Engine: D24 3,284 cc (200.4 cu in) 60° V6 Front longitudinal
- Transmission: 4-speed manual, limited-slip differential
- Weight: 750 kg (1,653.5 lb) (dry)

Competition history
- Debut: 1953: Nürburgring 1000 km
- First win: 1953: 6^{a} Bologna–Passo della Raticosa
- Last win: 1954: 2^{a} Coppa Firenze–Siena

The Lancia D24 was a sports racing car introduced by Lancia in 1953, and raced in the 1953 and 1954 seasons. It kept the overall layout of its predecessor the D23—that is a multi-tubular frame chassis, double wishbones/De Dion suspension, transaxle transmission and a barchetta body—but had a large 3,284 cc V6 engine. The V6 produced 265 hp (198 kW), giving the car a top speed of 260 km/h (162 mph).

Some of the D24's most significant overall victories are those by Juan Manuel Fangio in the 1953 Carrera Panamericana, by Alberto Ascari in the 1954 Mille Miglia, and by Piero Taruffi in the 1954 Targa Florio and Giro di Sicilia.

In 1955, the President of Lancia presented a D24 to President Juan Perón of Argentina who raced it nationally in the blue and yellow national livery. It was returned to Italy in the 1980s and restored by the Count Vittorio Zanon. This is one of just two D24s in existence; the other is in the Lancia Museum.

== Racing ==
Lancia D24 Spider won 1954 Mille Miglia driven by Alberto Ascari. The previous year it had already taken Juan Manuel Fangio and Gino Bronzoni to victory at the Carrera Panamericana.

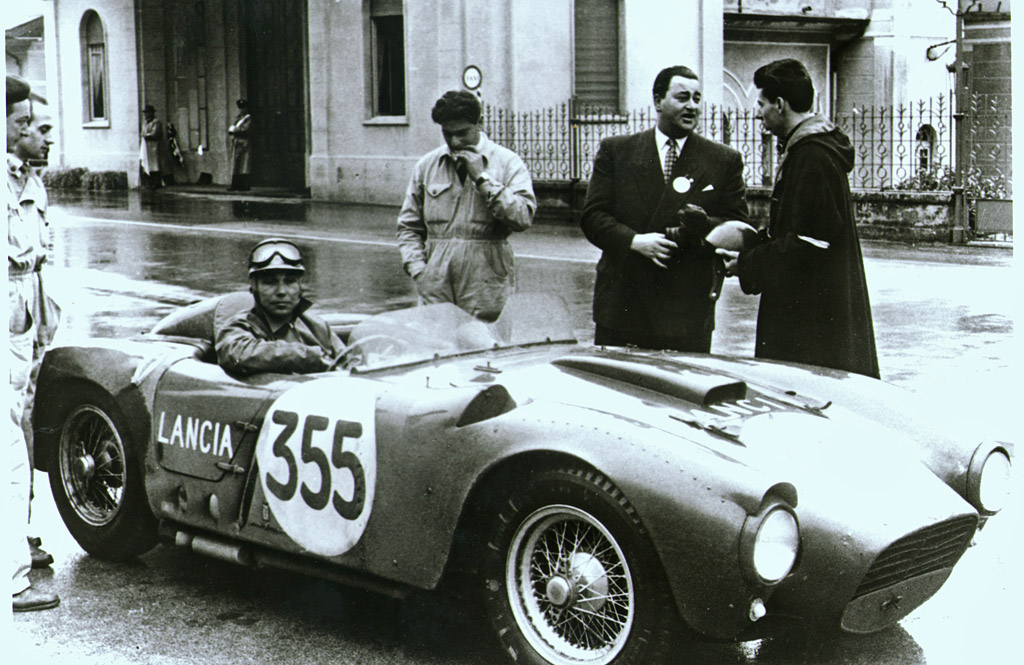
Piero Taruffi winner of the 1954 Giro di Sicilia

Lancia D24 racing results
Year	Event	Cars entered	Result (drivers)
1953	(Germany) 1000 km Nürburgring	2	All retired
1953	(Italy) 1° Gran Premio Supercortemaggiore	2	All retired
1953	(Italy) 6^{a} Bologna–Passo della Raticosa	2	1st (Felice Bonetto); 2nd (Eugenio Castellotti)
1953	(Mexico) 5th Carrera Panamericana	3	1st overall (Juan Manuel Fangio); 2nd overall (Piero Taruffi); Felice Bonetto on the third D24 died in an accident
1954	(United States) 12 Hours of Sebring	4	2nd overall (Luigi Valenzano/Porfirio Rubirosa)
1954	(Italy) 14° Giro di Sicilia	1	1st (Piero Taruffi)
1954	(Italy) 6^{a} Coppa della Toscana	2	All retired
1954	(Italy) 21^{a} Mille Miglia;	4	1st overall (Alberto Ascari); three retired
1954	(Italy) 38^{a} Targa Florio	2	1st overall (Piero Taruffi); ret. (Eugenio Castellotti)
1954	(Portugal) Oporto Grand Prix	3	1st (Gigi Villoresi); 2nd (Eugenio Castellotti); one ret.
1954	(Italy) 14^{a} Bolzano–Passo Mendola	1	1st (Eugenio Castellotti)
1954	(Italy) 16^{a} Aosta–Gran San Bernardo	1	1st (Eugenio Castellotti)
1954	(United Kingdom) 21st RAC Tourist Trophy	2	1st in class (Piero Taruffi/Juan Manuel Fangio); 2nd in class (Robert Manzon/Eugenio Castellotti)
1954	(Italy) 9^{a} Catania–Etna	1	1st (Piero Taruffi)
1954	(Italy) 16^{a} Treponti–Castelnuovo	1	1st (Eugenio Castellotti)
1954	(Italy) 5^{a} Coppa d’Oro di Sicilia	1	1st (Piero Taruffi)
1954	(Italy) 2^{a} Coppa Firenze–Siena	1	1st (Eugenio Castellotti)
World Sportscar Championship race
