= 1953 World Sportscar Championship =

Racing tournament

Seasons
- ← none 1954 →

The 1953 World Sportscar Championship was the first FIA World Sportscar Championship. It was a seven race international motor racing series for sports cars contested from 8 March to 23 November 1953. The championship was won by Ferrari.

== Season ==
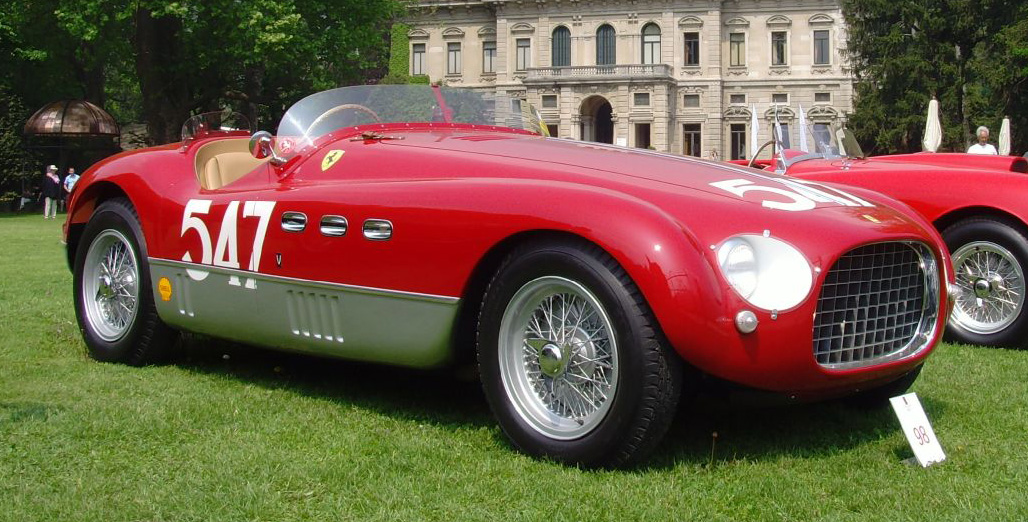
Ferrari won the championship with its 340 MM (pictured) and 375 MM models

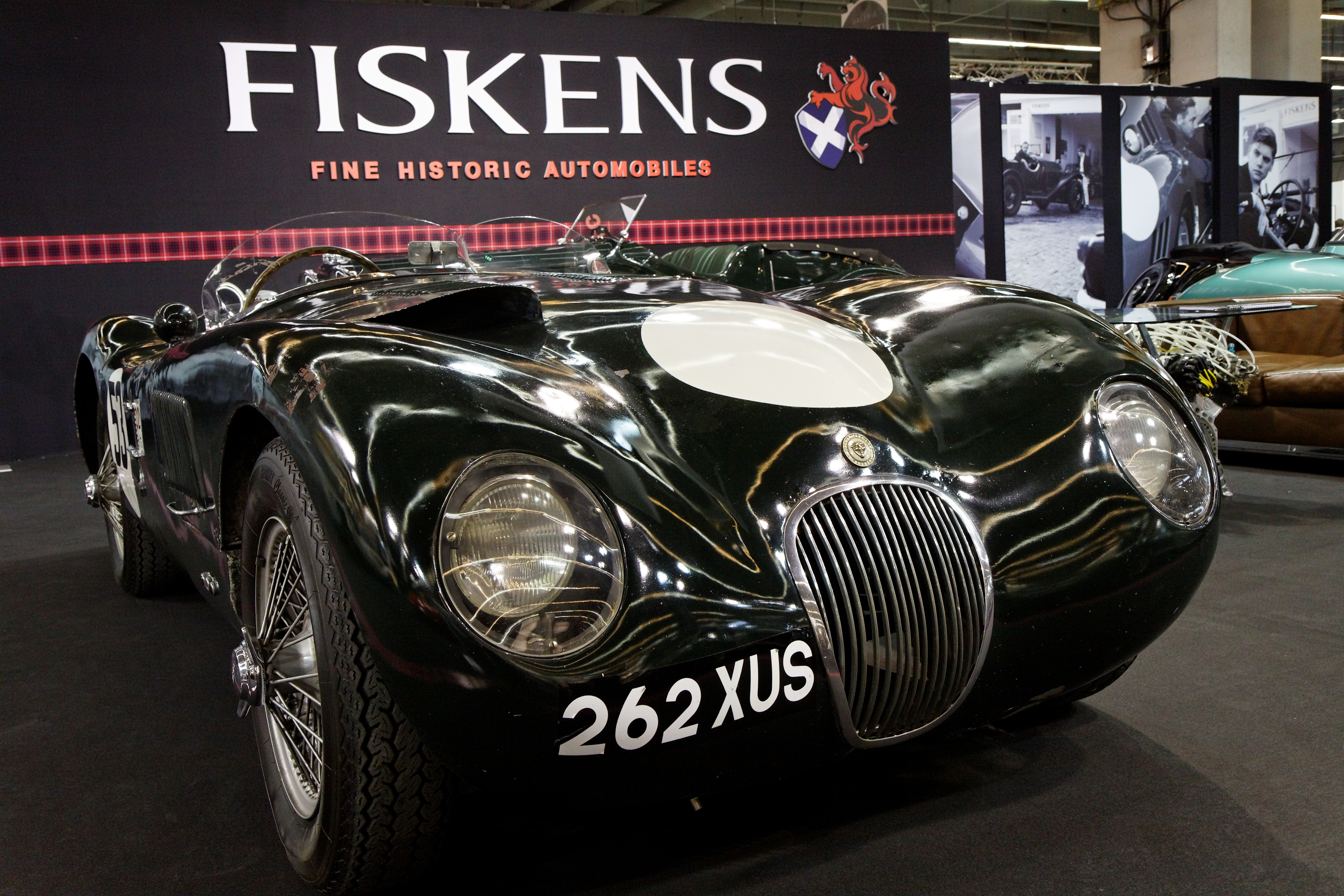
Jaguar placed second with its C-Type

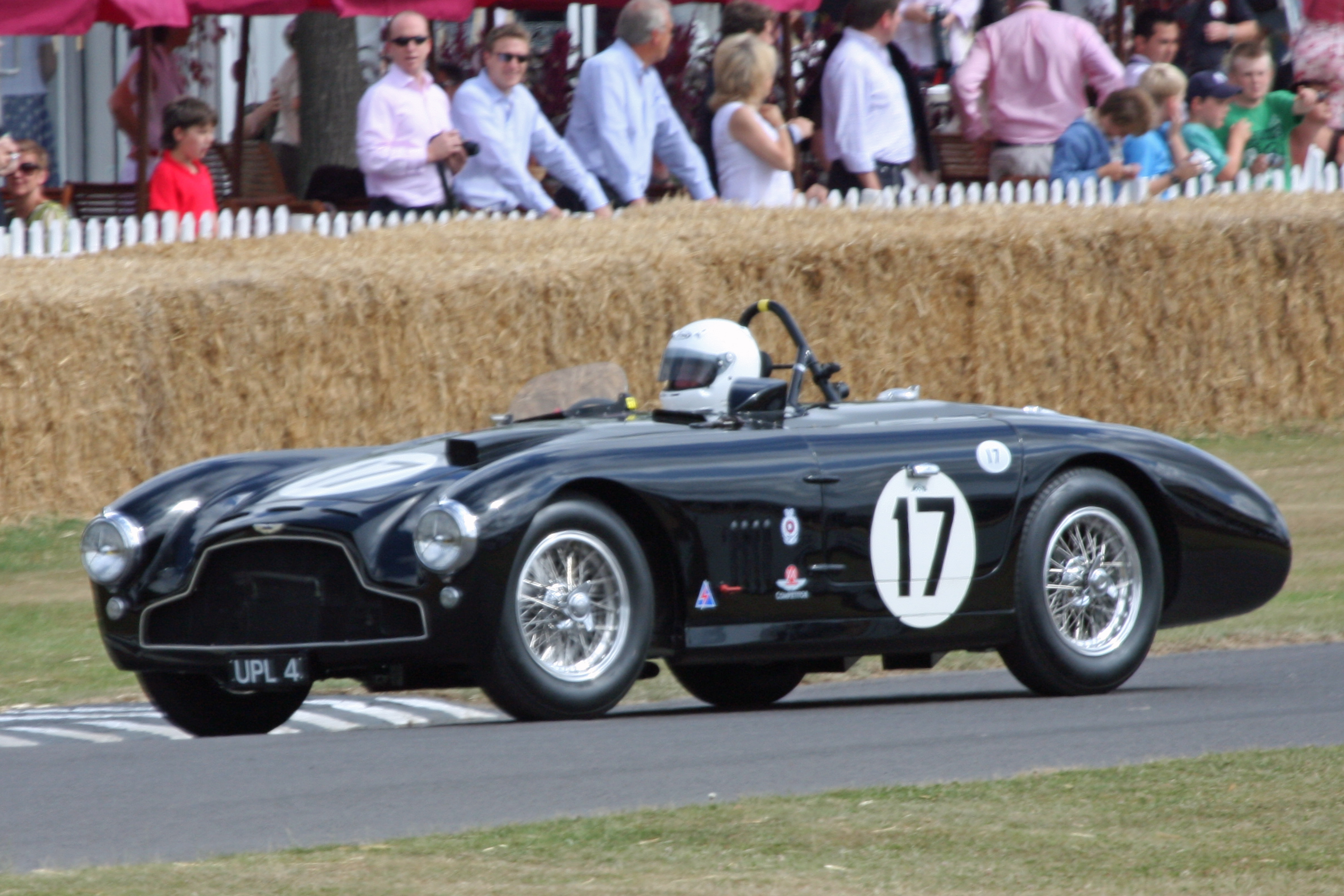
Aston Martin placed third with its DB3 (pictured) and DB3S models

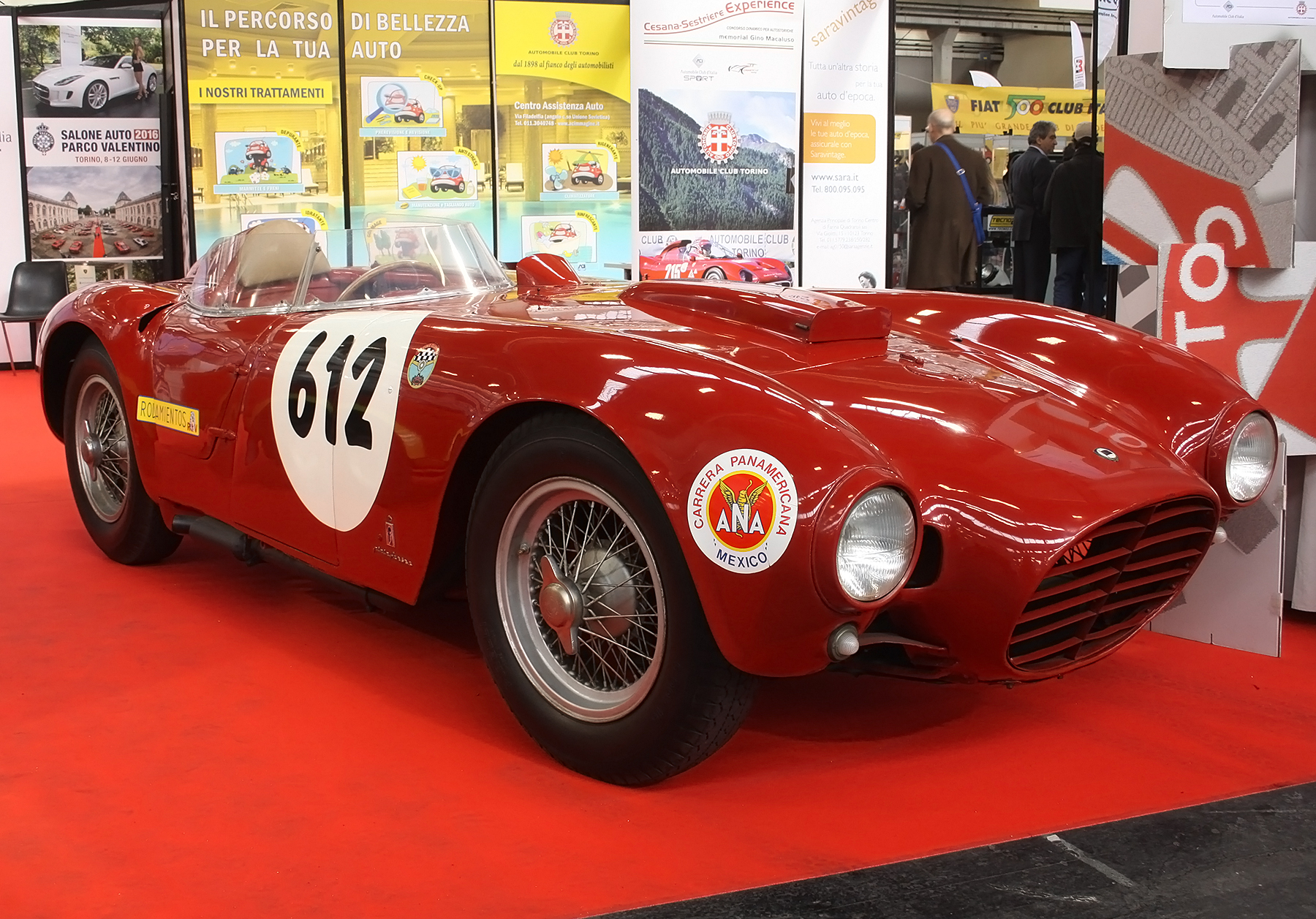
Lancia placed equal fourth with its D20 & D24 models. A D24 is pictured above

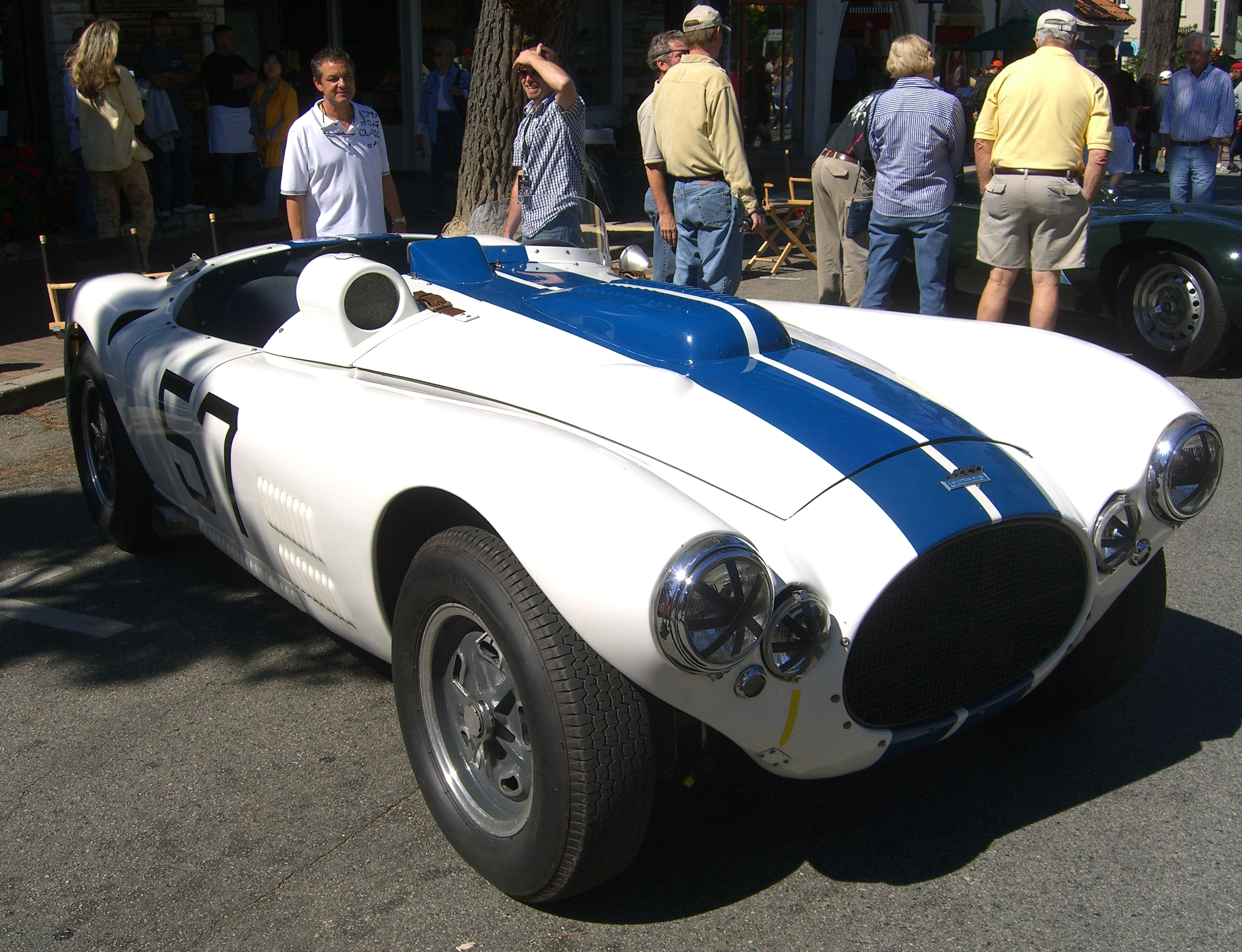
Cunningham placed equal fourth with its C-4R (pictured) and C-5R models

The 1953 World Sports Car Championship was contested over a seven race series. Now legendary and shockingly dangerous races such as the Mille Miglia and the Carrera Panamericana were part of an international race calendar, accompanied by the 24 Hours of Le Mans and 24 Hours of Spa, with the inaugural race being the 12 Hours of Sebring in the United States.

The Championship was for manufacturers, and works teams such as Scuderia Ferrari, Lancia, Aston Martin and Jaguar leading the way, but the majority of the fields were made up of amateur or gentlemen drivers, often up against professional racing drivers with experience in Formula One. Sometimes, even the Drivers World Champion joined in.

Entries were divided into classes based on engine displacement. Scuderia Ferrari were a dominant force in 1953, winning three of the seven races.

== Season results ==
=== Results ===
| Round Date | Event Circuit or Location | Winning driver | Winning team | Winning car | Results |
|---|---|---|---|---|---|
| 1 08/03 | (United States) 12 Hours of Sebring; Sebring International Raceway | (United States) Phil Walters (United States) John Fitch | (United States) Briggs Cunningham | Cunningham C-4R | Results |
| 2 26/04 | (Italy) Mille Miglia; Brescia-Rome-Brescia | (Italy) Giannino Marzotto (Italy) Marco Crosara | (Italy) Scuderia Ferrari | Ferrari 340 MM | Results |
| 3 13/06 14/06 | (France) 24 Hours of Le Mans; Circuit de la Sarthe | (United Kingdom) Tony Rolt (United Kingdom) Duncan Hamilton | (United Kingdom) Jaguar Cars Ltd. | Jaguar C-Type | Results |
| 4 25/07 26/07 | (Belgium) 24 Hours de Spa; Circuit de Spa-Francorchamps | (Italy) Giuseppe Farina (United Kingdom) Mike Hawthorn | (Italy) Scuderia Ferrari | Ferrari 375 MM | Results |
| 5 30/08 | (West Germany) ADAC 1000km Nürburgring; Nürburgring | (Italy) Alberto Ascari (Italy) Giuseppe Farina | (Italy) Scuderia Ferrari | Ferrari 375 MM | Results |
| 6 05/09 | (United Kingdom) RAC Tourist Trophy; Dundrod Circuit | (United Kingdom) Peter Collins (United Kingdom) Pat Griffith | (United Kingdom) Aston Martin Ltd. | Aston Martin DB3S | Results |
| 7 19/11 23/11 | (Mexico) Carrera Panamericana; Tuxtla Gutiérrez-Ciudad Juárez | (Argentina) Juan Manuel Fangio (Italy) Gino Bronzoni | (Italy) Scuderia Lancia | Lancia D24 | Results |

=== Championship ===
| Pos. | Manufacturer | (United States) SEB | (Italy) MMI | (France) LMS | (Belgium) SPA | (West Germany) NÜR | (United Kingdom) TTR | (Mexico) PAN | Total |
|---|---|---|---|---|---|---|---|---|---|
| 1 | (Italy) Ferrari | (1) | 8 | (2) | 8 | 8 | | 3 | 27 (30) |
| 2 | (United Kingdom) Jaguar | 4 | | 8 | 6 | 6 | (4) | | 24 (28) |
| 3 | (United Kingdom) Aston Martin | 6 | 2 | | | | 8 | | 16 |
| 4= | (Italy) Lancia | | 4 | | | | | 8 | 12 |
| 4= | (United States) Cunningham | 8 | | 4 | | | | | 12 |
| 6 | (Italy) Alfa Romeo | | 6 | | | | | | 6 |
| 7 | (West Germany) Borgward | | | | | 4 | | | 4 |
| 8= | (France) D.B. | | | | 3 | | | | 3 |
| 8= | (West Germany) Porsche | | | | | 3 | | | 3 |
| 10= | (Italy) O.S.C.A. | 2 | | | | | | | 2 |
| 10= | (West Germany) Veritas | | | | | 2 | | | 2 |
| 10= | (France) Talbot | | | | | | | 2 | 2 |
| 13= | (Italy) Maserati | | 1 | | | | | | 1 |
| 13= | (France) Gordini | | | 1 | | | | | 1 |
| 13= | (United Kingdom) Frazer Nash | | | | | | 1 | | 1 |

Championship points were awarded for the first six places in each race in the order of 8-6-4-3-2-1. Manufacturers were only awarded points for their highest finishing car with no points awarded for positions filled by additional cars. Only the best 4 results out of the 7 races could be retained by each manufacturer. Points earned but not counted towards the championship totals are listed within brackets in the above table.

== The cars ==
The following models contributed to the net championship point scores of their respective manufacturers.

- Ferrari 340 MM & Ferrari 375 MM
- Jaguar C-Type
- Aston Martin DB3 & Aston Martin DB3S
- Lancia D20 & Lancia D24
- Cunningham C-4R & Cunningham C-5R
- Alfa Romeo 6C 3000 CM
- Borgward Hansa 1500 RS
- DB Panhard HBR
- Porsche 550
- OSCA MT4
- Veritas Comet RS
- Talbot Lago T26 GS
- Maserati A6GCS
- Gordini T24S
- Frazer Nash Le Mans Mark II
