= Enrico Anselmi =

Italian racing driver

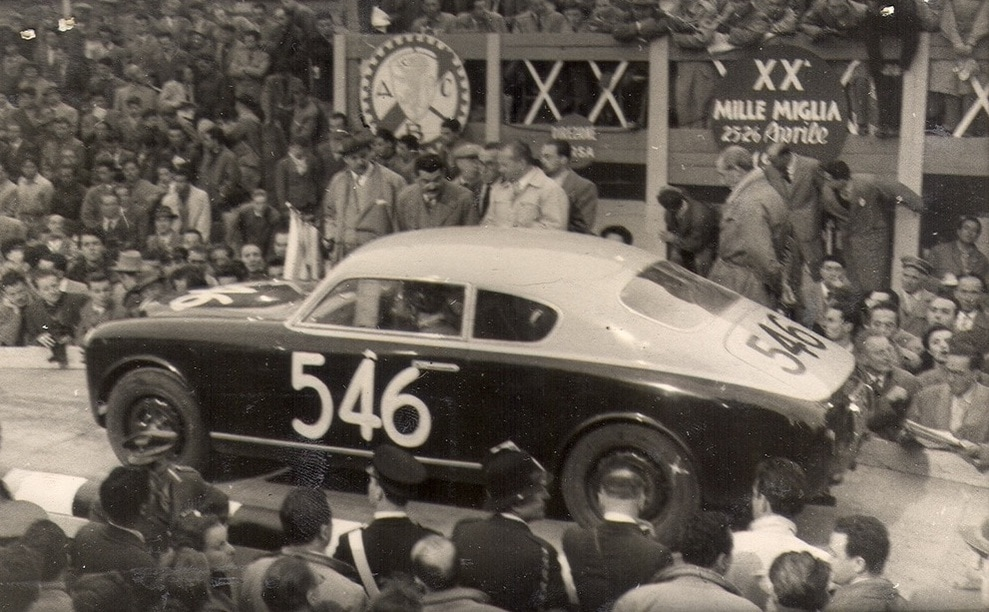
- Enrico driving a Lancia Aurelia B20 at 1953 Mille Miglia to 7th place
- Nationality: (Italy) Italian
- Born: Enrico Anselmi
24 Hours of Le Mans career
- Years: 1952
- Teams: Scuderia Lancia
- Best finish: 8th (1952)

Enrico Anselmi was an Italian racing driver, who made a name for himself racing Lancias in the early 1950s.

== Racing career ==
Enrico Anselmi, raced internationally, primarily in sportscars between 1947 and 1957, mainly in Lancia Aprilias and Lancia Aurelias. In 1952, his big break came when Scuderia Lancia offer him the chance to drive a works Aurelia in les 24 Heures de Mans, where partnered Felice Bonetto to eighth place overall.

During this period, he enjoyed some success, scoring his only race win, in the 1951 non-championship Coppa d'Oro delle Dolomiti and finished second in the 6 Ore di Pescara. In addition, he also won his class on the Mille Miglia that season. He repeated this feat the following season and claimed another class win. Away from Sportscars, Enrico raced in just one Formula Two race, the 1951 Gran Premio del V Centenario Colombiano, but retired his Ferrari 166. In the 1952 Targa Florio, he finished third, in the year; the Aurelia occupied the whole podium of the famous Sicilian competition.

After finishing 1st and 3rd at the 1957 Coppa Inter-Europa, held at the Autodromo Nazionale Monza, in the GT1.1 and GT2.6 classes respectively, he would retire from International Motor Sport.

== Racing record ==
=== Career highlights ===
Season	Series	Position	Team	Car
1951	Coppa d'Oro delle Dolomiti	1st		Lancia Aurelia B20
	6 Ore di Pescara	2nd		Lancia Aurelia
1952	Targa Florio	3rd		Lancia Aurelia B20 Competizione
1953	Giro delle Calabria	3rd		Lancia Aurelia 2500 GT

=== Complete 24 Hours of Le Mans results ===
Year	Team	Co-Drivers	Car	Class	Laps	Pos.	Class Pos.
1952	(Italy) Scuderia Lancia	(Italy) Felice Bonetto	Lancia Aurelia B20	S2.0	247	8th	2nd

=== Complete Mille Miglia results ===
Year	Team	Co-Drivers	Car	Class	Pos.	Class Pos.
1947		(Italy) P. Gianni	Fiat	S2.0	19th	2nd
1948		(Italy) Remy Jacazio	Fiat 1100	S1.1	11th	8th
1950		(Italy) M. Gambaro	Lancia Aprilia	T+1.1	27th	4th
1951		(Italy) Luciano Gianni	Lancia Aprilia	VU1.5	24th	1st
1952		(Italy) "Semino"	Lancia Aurelia B20	GT2.0	5th	1st
1953	Scuderia Lancia	(Italy) Luigi Maggio	Lancia Aurelia B20	S+2.0	7th	6th
1954			Lancia Aurelia B20	S+2.0	DNF	
1957			Lancia Appia GT Zagato	GT1.1	54th	2nd

Sporting positions
Preceded by Giannino Marzotto	Coppa d’Oro delle Dolomiti; 1951	Succeeded by Paolo Marzotto
