= 1950 Carrera Panamericana =

The 1950 Carrera Panamericana was a motor race held in Mexico from 5 May to 10 May 1950. It was the first edition of the Carrera Panamericana.

== Background ==
After the Mexican section of the Pan-American Highway was completed in 1950, a nine-stage, six-day race across the country was organized by the Mexican government to advertise this feat and to attract international business into Mexico. The race ran almost entirely along the new highway, which crossed the country from north to south for a total distance of over 3,300 kilometres (2,100 mi). Antonio Cornejo, a Pontiac dealer in Mexico City, was the general manager of the event.

== Drivers ==
Racers from the US, Italy, France, Spain, Venezuela, Colombia, Guatemala, Peru and obviously, Mexico. The Formula 1 drivers Piero Taruffi and Felice Bonetto took part in the race. Also Bill France Sr., the founder of NASCAR. Other NASCAR drivers participated as Hershel McGriff, Curtis Turner. The sports car racer Jean Trévoux also took part.

== The route ==
The first race ran from north to south, beginning in Ciudad Juárez, Chihuahua, across the international border from El Paso, Texas, and finishing in El Ocotal, Chiapas, (now known as Cd. Cuauhtémoc) on the Guatemala–Mexico border opposite from La Mesilla, Guatemala. At least one stage was run each day for six consecutive days. The elevation changes were significant: from 328 ft (100 m) to 10,482 ft (3,195 m) above sea level, requiring amongst other modifications re-jetting of carburettors to cope with thinner air. Most of the race was run between 5,000 ft (1,500 m) and 8,000 ft (2,400 m).

== Results ==
The first three places were won by American cars and American drivers. The winner, Hershel McGriff, drove an Oldsmobile 88 at an average speed of 142 km/h (88 mph). Though less powerful, the car was substantially lighter than its big Lincoln and Cadillac competitors, meaning that it would eventually pull away from them on the steep, winding course. The car (which had cost McGriff only $1,900, when the winner's purse was $17,000), had another advantage in its weight – it was much easier to stop, meaning that McGriff finished the race on his original brake shoes when the big cars were re-shoeing every night. The reason that this was so important was that neither McGriff nor his co-driver were capable of even the most basic maintenance to the car. McGriff also noted that the control afforded by his manual gearbox gave him a significant advantage the last day on the gravel roads in Chiapas, when he finally passed the Cadillac leading the race. The best placed European car, in fourth position, was an Alfa Romeo 6C driven by Italian driver Piero Taruffi.

Rank	Drivers	Car	Time
1	(United States) Hershel McGriff (United States) Ray Elliott	(United States) Oldsmobile 88	27:34:35
2	(United States) Thomas A. Deal (United States) Sam Cresap	(United States) Cadillac Series 62	+1:06
3	(United States) Al Rogers (United States) Ralph Rogers	(United States) Cadillac Series 62	+21:04
4	(Italy) Piero Taruffi (Italy) Isidoro Ceroli	(Italy) Alfa Romeo 6C	+26:29
5	(United States) Bud Sennett (United States) John C Walch	(United States) Oldsmobile 88	+27:46
6	(United States) Lewis Hawkins (United States) Wayland Burgess	(United States) Oldsmobile 88	+44:40
7	(Mexico) Luis Leal Solares (Mexico) Damaso De la Concha	(United States) Oldsmobile 88	+49:19
8	(Italy) Felice Bonetto (Italy) Bruno Bonini	(Italy) Alfa Romeo 6C	+51:01
9	(United States) Johnny Mantz (United States) Bill Stroppe	(United States) Lincoln Cosmopolitan	+52:35
10	(United States) Jack McAfee (United States) Ford Robinson	(United States) Cadillac Series 62 Sedanette	+53:28
11	(Mexico) Raul Argilles Salgado	(United States) Mercury	+1:11:14
12	(France) Jean Trevoux (France) André Mariotti	(France) Delahaye 175S	+1:20:29
13	(Mexico) Jesus Nava Gonzales	(United States) Lincoln	+1:23:47
14	(United States) Edmund A. Kasold (United States) Geano Contessotto	(United States) Ford	+1:36:42
15	(Mexico) Leo Almanza	(United States) Mercury	+1:48:31
16	(United States) Owen R. Gray (United States) Leon McMillan	(United States) Oldsmobile	+1:52:17
17	(Colombia) Arcesio Paz	(United States) Mercury	+2:04:13
18	(Mexico) Carlos G. Mass	(United States) Oldsmobile	+2:07:35
19	(Mexico) Abelardo Matamoros Acosta	(United States) Lincoln	+2:09:08
20	(Mexico) Jesus Valezzi (Mexico) Duenas Costa	(United States) Lincoln Cosmopolitan	+2:21:50

== Stages ==
Leg	Date	Route	Driver	Car	Length	Time
1	5 May	Ciudad Juarez-Chihuahua	(United States) Bill Sterling	Cadillac	375	2:19:12
2	6 May	Chihuahua-Parral	(United States) George Lynch	Cadillac	300	1:56:38
3	6 May	Parral-Durango	(United States) Bill Sterling	Cadillac	404	2:55:08
4	7 May	Durango-León	(United States) Lonnie Johnson	Cadillac	547	3:46:14
5	7 May	León-Mexico City	(United States) Tom Deal	Cadillac Series 62	448	2:59:15
6	8 May	Mexico City-Puebla	(Mexico) Fernando Razo Maciel	Packard	135	1:03:05
7	8 May	Puebla-Oaxaca	(Italy) Piero Taruffi	Alfa Romeo 6C	412	3:45:26
8	9 May	Oaxaca-Tuxtla Gutiérrez	(United States) Johnny Mantz	Lincoln	540	4:35:38
9	10 May	Tuxtla Gutiérrez-El Ocotal	(Italy) Felice Bonetto	Alfa Romeo 6C	275	2:59:22

== Fatalities ==
In this edition four people were killed. A four-year-old Juan Altamirano was hit by the car of Jesús Valezzi and Adolfo Dueñas Costa in the first stage in Cd. Juárez before the start of the race.

In the same stage near to finish line the Guatemalan Enrique Hachmeister lost the control of his Lincoln.

The Peruvian co-driver Jesús Reyes Molina died in the fourth stage in León, Guanajuato when the Nash of Henry Charles Bradley crashed with a bridge in the Florida river. Reyes Molina was taken to León Hospital, where he died.

The Nash Ambassador driven by the Americans Eddie Sollohub-Nicholeo Scott hit the crowd and killed a spectator in the fourth stage.
