= 1954 Mille Miglia =

World sportscar championship

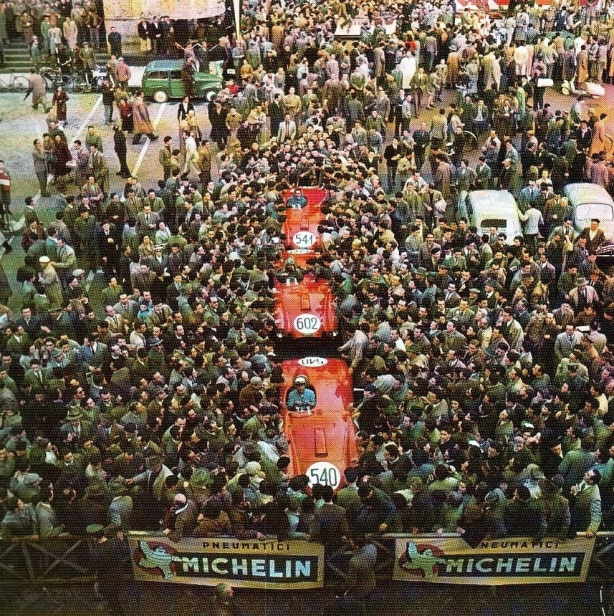
Three Lancia D24 at start at Brescia on 1 May 1954. Nearest is #540 Eugenio Castellotti, in the middle is #602 Alberto Ascari and in the back #541 Gino Valenzano.

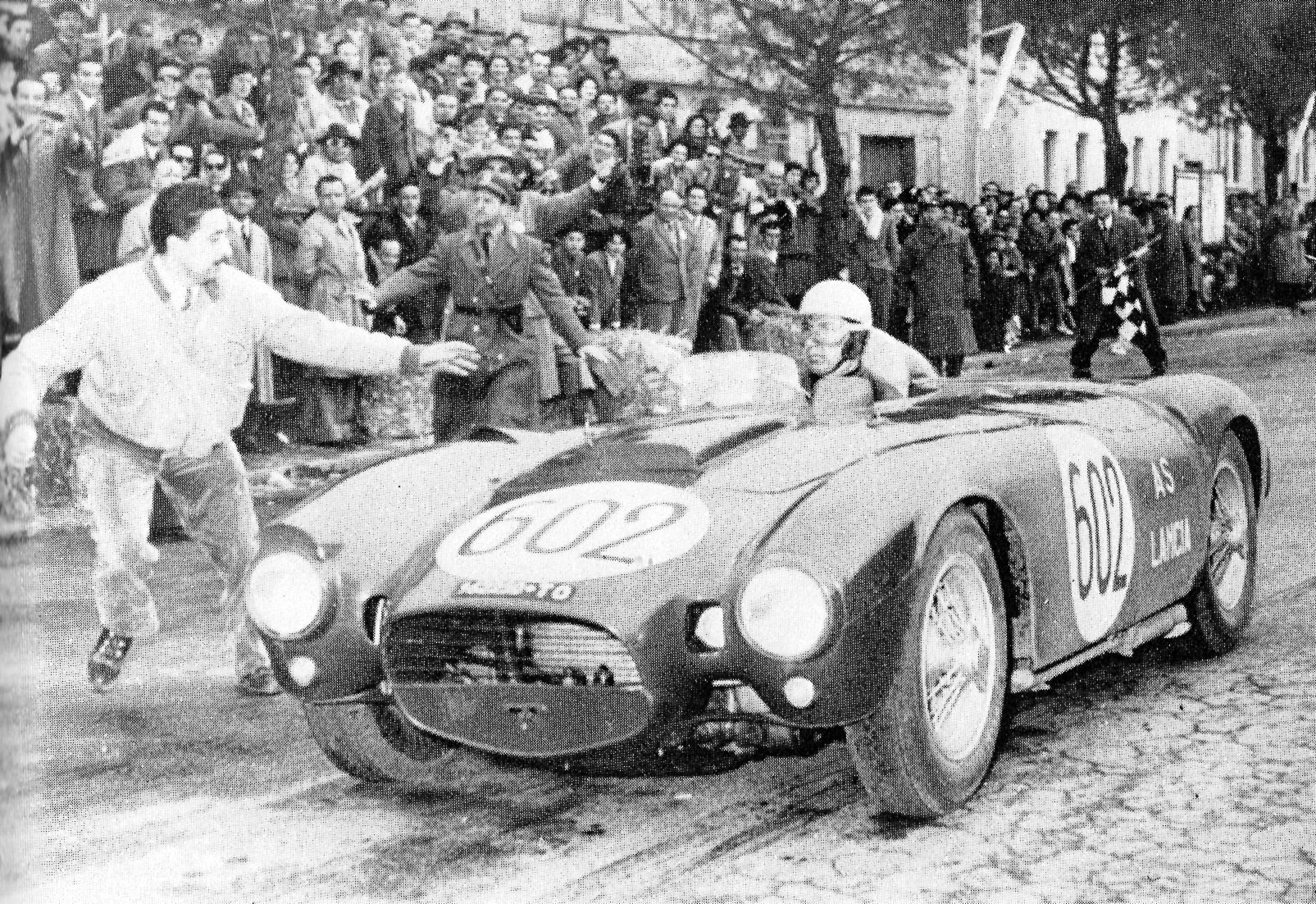
Excited spectators as Alberto Ascari wins in his Lancia D24.

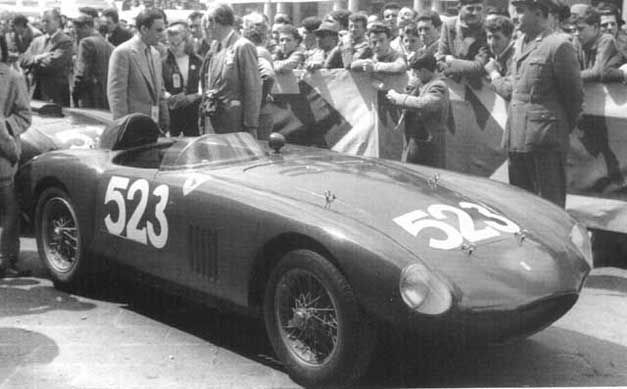
This Ferrari 500 Mondial got 2nd place, driven by Vittorio Marzotto

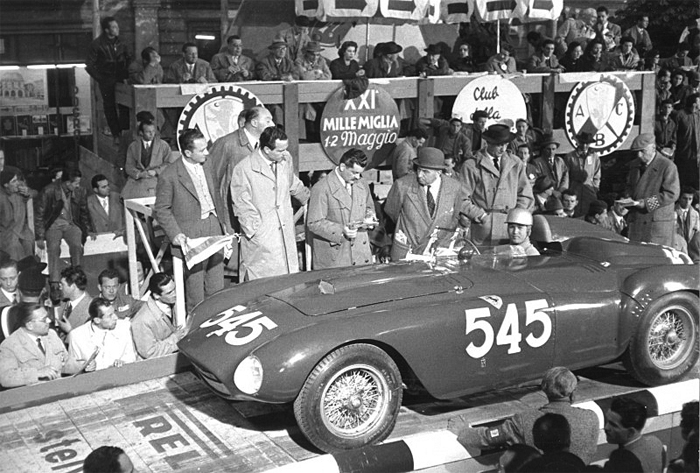
Umberto Maglioli in his Ferrari 375 Plus at start in Brescia

The 1954 Mille Miglia (officially XXI Mille Miglia), was a motor race open to Sports Cars, GT cars and Touring Cars. It was the 21st Mille Miglia and the third race of the 1954 World Sportscar Championship. The race was held on the public roads of Italy on 2 May 1954 using a route based on a round trip between Brescia and Rome, with the start and finish in Brescia. It was won by Alberto Ascari driving a Lancia D24.

As in previous year, the event is not strictly a race against each other, as is a race against the clock. The cars are released at one-minute intervals with the larger professional class cars going before the slower cars, in the Mille Miglia, however the smaller displacement slower cars started first. Each car number related to their allocated start time. For example, Giuseppe Farina’s car had the number 606, he left Brescia at 6:06 am, while the first cars had started late in the evening on the previous day.

The previous August, Italian racing legend Tazio Nuvolari died. As a mark of respect, the route of this race was changed to divert through Mantua, where he was a resident.

== Report ==
=== Entry ===
A total of 483 cars were entered for the event, across nine classes based on engine sizes, ranging from up to 750cc to over 2.0 litre, for Grand Touring Cars, Touring Cars and Sport Cars. Of these, 378 cars started the event.

Fresh from their loss in Florida at the 12 Hours of Sebring, Lancia entered in force with four newly revised D24 cars, these were piloted by Piero Taruffi, Alberto Ascari, Eugenio Castellotti and Gino Valenzano. The cars were modified by race car designer Vittorio Jano. These enhancements featured an enlarge version of their V6 engine, so that could produce 265 bhp.

Ferrari for their part arrived with four 300 bhp 4.9 litre, Ferrari 375 Plus’s for Giuseppe Farina, Umberto Maglioli, Giannino Marzotto and his brother Paolo Marzotto. For 1954, the Mille Miglia was a round of the World Sports Car Championship; the home teams faced strong challengers. From Great Britain, came Aston Martin and Austin-Healey, and West Germany sent Porsches.

Also amongst the entry was the four-time winner, Clemente Biondetti, but by the time of the race, he was very sick man, fighting cancer, and only had a few months left to live.

=== Race ===
The race started at 21:01 on 1 May, when Domenico Stragliotto and Adolfo Montorio departed Brescia in their Iso Isetta. The faster cars would leave the following morning, when conditions were foggy mixed with little rain. After nine and half hours, all the cars were on their way to Rome.

The Lancias took the early lead, with Taruffi's D24 controlling the pace, averaging 108.9 mph, on the opening stages into Ravenna, with a lead of 90 seconds, over Ascari and Castellotti. The Ferrari of Maglioli was back in fourth. On the run into Rome, the Lancia of Castellotti developed distributor problems, and was forced into retirement, moving Maglioli into third. Further trouble hit the Lancia of Taruffi, when his sprung an oil leak and he soon retired. Ascari had taken it easy in the early stages, now assumed the lead.

On the run back to Brescia, Ascari's Lancia suffered a throttle spring return failure, and this was temporarily replaced by a rubber band. This and other problems started to affect the Lancia and by the time Ascari reached Florence, he had enough and wanted to retire from the event. It was only after a long stop for repairs, he was persuaded to continue. By Bologna, all the top Scuderia Ferrari cars were out, and the path was clear for Ascari to win.

For Ferrari, they had not lost a Mille Miglia since 1947, but this they were sounded thrashed by the team from Torino, with Ascari, winning in a time of 11hr 26:10mins., averaging a speed of 72.80 mph. 33:51mins adrift in second place was Ferrari 500 Mondial of Vittorio Marzotto, who salvaged some honour for Maranello marque with second place and a class win. The third different car on the podium was the Maserati of Musso. Another Ferrari came home in fourth, driven by Biondetti, in what was to be his last Mille Miglia; he was lifted exhausted from the car at the finish.

With the British attack failing to make it back to Brescia, it was left to the Germans to provide some opposition to the Italian teams. Encountering a lowered gate at a railway crossing, the Porsche driver, Hans Herrmann drove his low 550 Spyder under it, narrowly missing an express train. This daring act gave Porsche a first in class and an amazing sixth overall.

The event was marred by fatal accidents which killed 5 people and injured 13. Andre Pouschol and co-driver Gabriel Saisse were both killed and eight spectators injured when his Citroën 15 Six crashed into a signpost near Vicenza 75 miles into the race. The second accident saw navigator Silvio Dal Cin lose his life when his driver Ferdinando Mancini crashed his Maserati A6GCS after crossing the finish line. While other competitors were still arriving, Mancini left the course area at speed, waving hands and greeting the crowd. Shortly later, for unknown reasons Mancini lost control of the Maserati and crashed, passing in a long straight towards Ghedi, a neighbourhood of Brescia. During the crash Dal Cin was thrown out and received fatal skull fractures, and on top of this the crashing Maserati also hit an unnamed bystander and killed him instantly. Another accident involving a Renault 4CV of Jean Bianchi-Jean Sigrand at the village of Alfonsine near Ravenna. 15-year old spectator Settimio Caroli was killed and 2 other spectators injured after the Renault went off the road and crashed; Bianchi and Sigrand were both unhurt. There was a spectating woman who was also killed during the race in unknown circumstances.

== Classification ==
=== Mille Miglia ===
Of the 378 starters, 182 were classified as finishers. Therefore, only a selection of notable racers has been listed below.

Class Winners are in Bold text.

Pos.	No.	Class	Driver(s)		Entrant	Car - Engine	Time	Reason Out
1st	**602**	**S+2.0**	**(Italy) Alberto Ascari**		**Scuderia Lancia**	**Lancia D24**	**11hr 26:10**	
2nd	**523**	**S2.0**	**(Italy) Vittorio Marzotto**		**Scuderia Ferrari**	**Ferrari 500 Mondial**	**12hr 00:01**	
3rd	500	S2.0	(Italy) Luigi Musso	(Italy) Augusto Zocca	Officine Alfieri Maserati	Maserati A6GCS/53	12hr 00:10	
4th	601	S+2.0	(Italy) Clemente Biondetti		Clemente Biondetti	Ferrari 250 MM Morelli Spider	12hr 15:36	
5th	506	S2.0	(Italy) Bruno Venezian	(Italy) Massimo Orlandi	Officine Alfieri Maserati	Maserati A6GCS	12hr 27:43	
6th	**351**	**S1.5**	**(West Germany) Hans Herrmann**	**(West Germany) Herbert Linge**	**Porsche**	**Porsche 550 Spyder**	**12hr 35:44**	
7th	**440**	**GT+1.5**	**(Italy) Gugliemo Serafini**	**(Italy) Carlo Mancini**	**Scuderia Lancia**	**Lancia Aurelia B20**	**12hr 47:12**	
8th	**326**	**T+1.3**	**(Italy) Piero Carinin**	**(Italy) A. Artesiani**		**Alfa Romeo 1900TI**	**12hr 51:52**	
9th	439	GT+1.5	(Italy) Carlo Leto di Priolo	(Italy) Salvatore Leto dr Prilol		Fiat 8V Zagato	12hr 52.38	
10th	343	S1.5	(Italy) Giulio Cabianca			O.S.C.A. MT4 1500	12hr 55:08	
11th	305	T+1.3	(Italy) Mario Della Favera	(Italy) R. Artusi		Alfa Romeo 1900TI	12hr 56:10	
12th	428	GT+1.5	(Italy) Paolo Petrobelli	(Italy) Evelino Cremonesi		Lancia Aurelia B20	**13hr 09:42**	
13th	553	S+2.0	(Italy) Ilfo Minzoni	(Italy) Giovannu Brinci		Ferrari 212 Export	13hr 10:34	
14th	516	S2.0	(Italy) Franco Cortese	(Italy) E. Perrucchini		Ferrari 500 Mondial	13hr 12:38	
15th	512	S2.0	(Italy) Enrico Sterzi	(Italy) O. Rossi		Ferrari 500 Mondial Pinin Farina Spyder	13hr 14:33	
16th	425	GT+1.5	(Italy) Ferdinando Gatta	(Italy) Giuseppe Azzini		Lancia Aurelia B20	13hr 16:06	
17th	430	GT+1.5	(Italy) Franco Ribaldi	(Italy) Romano Basili		Lancia Aurelia B20	13hr 19:49	
18th	416	GT+1.5	(Italy) Pierpaolo Poillucci	(Italy) Manilo Poillucci		Fiat 8V	13hr 25.29	
19th	534	S+2.0	(Italy) Innocente Baggio	(Italy) E. Berni		Ferrari 250 MM Berlinetta	13hr 31:38	
20th	524	S2.0	(Italy) Luigi Oiotti	(Italy) Bruno Cavallari		O.S.C.A. MT4 1100	13hr 31:52	
21st	411	GT+1.5	(Belgium) Olivier Gendebien	(Belgium) Charles Fraikin	Olivier Gendebien	Jaguar XK120	13hr 34:03	
22nd	312	T+1.3	(Italy) Lino Franceschetti	(Italy) Polo Meo		Alfa Romeo 1900TI	13hr 38:12	
23rd	550	S+2.0	(United Kingdom) Lance Macklin			Austin-Healey 100	13hr 38:34	
24th	433	GT+1.5	(Italy) Eugenio Lubich	(Italy) Luigi Villotti		Lancia Aurelia B20	13hr 40:39	
25th	444	GT+1.5	(Italy) Piero Siena	(Italy) Antonio Negri Bevilacqua		Lancia Aurelia B20	13hr 41:55	
26th	431	S2.0	(Italy) Ottavio Randaccio	(Italy) P. E. Serboli		Lancia Aurelia	13hr 42:45	
27th	528	S2.0	(Netherlands) Maurice Gatsonides	(United Kingdom) W. Ken Richardson		Triumph TR2	13hr 52:31	
28th	317	T+1.3	(Italy) Siro Sbraci	(Italy) Giudizi		Alfa Romeo 1900TI	13hr 53:12s.	
29th	**229**	**GT1.5**	**(West Germany) Richard von Frankenberg**	**(West Germany) Heinrich Sauter**	**Porsche**	**Porsche 356 1500 Super**	**13hr 53:50**	
30th	331	T+1.3	(Italy) Franco Marenghi	(Italy) Franco Concari		Alfa Romeo 1900 TI	14hr 00:53	
33rd	228	GT1.5	(West Germany) Walter Hampel	(West Germany) Wolfgang von Trips	Porsche	Porsche 356 1300 Super	14hr 11:23	
34th	219	GT1.5	(West Germany) Max Nathan	(West Germany) Helmut Glöckler		Porsche 356 1300 Super	14hr 13:14	
36th	424	GT+1.5	(France) Michel Parsy	(France) Georges Guyot		Jaguar XK120	14hr 17:00	
41st	**156**	**T1.3**	**(Italy) Ersilio Mandrini**	**(Italy) M. Ferraris**		**Fiat 1100/103 TV**	**14hr 34:35**	
52nd	457	S2.0	(Italy) Consalvo Sanesi	(Italy) Giuseppe Cagna		Alfa Romeo 1900 TI	14hr 46:06	
55th	349	S1.5	(Belgium) Gilberte Thirion	(Belgium) Annie Bousquet	Thirion/Bousquet	Gordini T15S	14hr 49:47	
65th	**2320**	**S750**	**(France) René Phillippe Faure**	**(France) Claude Storez**		**DB HBR Panhard**	**15hr 03:16**	
66th	**2206**	**T750**	**(France) Jean Rédélé**	**(France) Louis Pons**		**Renault 4CV**	**15hr 04:33**	
86th	028	T1.3	(Italy) Roberto Lippi	(Italy) V. Galenda		Fiat 1100/103	15hr 35:12	
94th	507	S2.0	(United Kingdom) Leslie Brooke	(United Kingdom) Jack Fairman		Triumph TR2	15hr 42:16	
100th	2137	T750	(Italy) Marino Guarnieri	(Italy) Danilo Brancalion		Renault 4CV	15hr 53:41	
159th	2341	S750	(Italy) Marino Brandoli	(Belgium) Johnny Claes		Marino-Fiat Coupe	18hr 49:59	
177th	2101	T750	(Italy) Domenico Stragliotto	(Italy) Adolfo Montorio		Iso Isetta	22hr 10:02	
DNF	253	T+1.3	(France) Andre Pouschol	(France) F. Saisse		Citroën 15 Six		Fatal Accident
DNF	409	S1.5	(Italy) Nello Pagani		Giacomo Pagani	Stanguellini Bialbero		DNF
DNF	519	S2.0	(Italy) F. Mancini	(Italy) S. Dal Cin		Maserati A6GCS	6hr 31:38	Fatal Accident – Dal Cin
DNF	526	S+2.0	(Italy) Paolo Marzotto	(Italy) Marino Marini	Scuderia Ferrari	Ferrari 375 Plus	5hr 45:57	Accident
DNF	538	S+2.0	(Italy) Gianni Marzotto	(Italy) Gioia Tortima	Scuderia Ferrari	Ferrari 375 Plus		Driver illness
DNF	539	S+2.0	(United Kingdom) Reg Parnell	(United Kingdom) Louis Klemantaski	David Brown	Aston Martin DB3S		Accident
DNF	540	S+2.0	(Italy) Eugenio Castellotti		Scuderia Lancia	Lancia D24		Distributor
DNF	541	S+2.0	(Italy) Gino Valenzano		Scuderia Lancia	Lancia D24		Accident
DNF	545	S+2.0	(Italy) Umberto Maglioli		Scuderia Ferrari	Ferrari 375 Plus	5hr 41:51	Accident
DNF	546	S+2.0	(Italy) Piero Scotti		Piero Scotti	Ferrari 375 MM	6hr 12:53	Accident
DNF	547	S+2.0	(Italy) Piero Taruffi		Scuderia Lancia	Lancia D24	5hr 30:19	Oil loss
DNF	548	S+2.0	(Italy) Franco Bordoni	(Italy) Cetti Sarbelloni	Franco Bordoni	Gordini T24S		Accident
DNF	549	S+2.0	(Italy) Gerino Gerini	(Italy) Luciano Donazzolo		Ferrari 250 MM		DNF
DNF	558	S+2.0	(Italy) Enrico Anselmi			Lancia Aurelia B20		DNF
DNF	551	S+2.0	(United Kingdom) Tommy Wisdom	(United Kingdom) Mortimer Morris-Goodall	Donald Healey	Austin-Healey 100	8hr 02:30	DNF
DNF	547	S+2.0	(France) Louis Chiron		Donald Healey	Austin-Healey 100		Brake Pipe
DNF	606	S+2.0	(Italy) Giuseppe Farina	(Italy) Luigi Parenti	Scuderia Ferrari	Ferrari 375 Plus		Accident
DNF	609	S+2.0	(United Kingdom) Peter Collins	(United Kingdom) Pat Griffith	David Brown	Aston Martin DB3S	6hr 08:45	Accident
DNF	613	S+2.0	(United Kingdom) George Abecassis	(United Kingdom) Denis Jenkinson	H. W. Motors	HWM Jaguar		Shock absorber
DNF	2215	T750	(France) Robert Manzon	(France) Maurice Foulgoc		Renault 4CV		DNF
DNF	2224	T750	(France) Guy Monraisse	(France) Jacques Féret		Renault 4CV	8hr 31:43	DNF

=== Class Winners ===
Class	Winners		
Vetture Sport oltre 2000	602	Lancia D24	Ascari
Vetture Sports 2000	523	Ferrari 500 Mondial	V. Marzotto
Vetture Sports 1500	351	Porsche 550 Spyder	Herrmann / Linge
Vetture Sports 750	2320	DB HBR Panhard	Faure / Storez
Gran Turismo oltre 1500	440	Lancia Aurelia B20	Serafini / Mancini
Gran Turismo fino 1500	229	Porsche 356 1500 Super	von Frankenberg / Sauter
Turismo Serie Speciale +1300	326	Alfa Romeo 1900 TI	Carini / Artesiani
Turismo Serie Speciale 1300	156	Fiat 1100/103 TV	Mandrini / Ferraris
Turismo Serie Speciale 750	2206	Renault 4CV	Rédélé / Pons

== Standings after the race ==
Pos	Championship	Points
1=	(Italy) Ferrari	14
	(Italy) Lancia	14
3	(Italy) Osca	8
4	(Italy) Maserati	5
5=	(United Kingdom) Aston Martin	4
	(United Kingdom) Austin-Healey	4

- Note: Only the top five positions are included in this set of standings.
  Championship points were awarded for the first six places in each race in the order of 8-6-4-3-2-1. Manufacturers were only awarded points for their highest finishing car with no points awarded for positions filled by additional cars. Only the best 4 results out of the 6 races could be retained by each manufacturer.

World Sportscar Championship
Previous race: 12 Hours of Sebring	1954 season	Next race: 24 Hours of Le Mans
