= Felice Bonetto =

Italian racing driver (1903–1953)

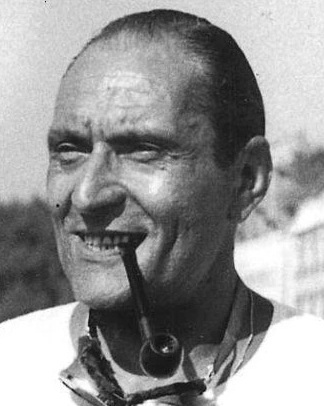
- Born: 9 June 1903; Manerbio, Brescia, Kingdom of Italy
- Died: 21 November 1953 (aged 50); Silao, Guanajuato, Mexico
- Cause of death: Injuries sustained at the 1953 Carrera Panamericana

Formula One World Championship career
- Nationality: (Italy) Italian
- Active years: 1950–1953
- Team(s): Milano, Alfa Romeo, Maserati
- Entries: 16 (15 starts)
- Championships: 0
- Wins: 0
- Podiums: 2
- Career points: 17.5
- Pole positions: 0
- Fastest laps: 0
- First entry: 1950 Swiss Grand Prix
- Last entry: 1953 Italian Grand Prix

24 Hours of Le Mans career
- Years: 1952–1953
- Teams: Rosier, Lancia
- Best finish: 8th (1952)
- Class wins: 0

Felice Bonetto (9 June 1903 – 21 November 1953) was an Italian racing driver, who competed in Formula One at 16 Grands Prix from 1950 to 1953. Nicknamed "il Pirata", (Note: English: the Pirate) Bonetto won the Targa Florio in 1952 with Lancia.

Born and raised in Manerbio, Bonetto began his career in motorcycle road racing before switching to Grand Prix motor racing in 1931. He enjoyed a brief Formula One career, racing Italian cars with Milano, Alfa Romeo and Maserati, achieving two podium finishes at the 1951 Italian and 1953 Dutch Grands Prix, the former he shared with Giuseppe Farina and the latter with José Froilán González. His greatest successes were in sportscar racing, winning the Targa Florio in 1952, but his career was cut short when he fatally collided with a lamp post whilst leading the 1953 Carrera Panamericana.

== Career ==
=== Debut and early career ===
Bonetto was born in Manerbio, which in the province of Brescia, the home of the Mille Miglia. Despite that, he began to race, very young, on motor bikes. The switch to four wheels came very late to modern standards; he, in fact, already 28 when he participated in the Bobbio-Penice, with a Bugatti. Despite having to make do with cars that not always competitive, but the results were not lacking. In 1933, Bonetto was third in the infamous Gran Premio di Monza with an Alfa Romeo 8C 2600. The race will always be remembered as the Black Day of Monza, when three of Europe's greatest racing drivers crashed fatally within a few hours of each other: Giuseppe Campari, Mario-Umberto Borzacchini and Count Stanisław Czaykowski. He also finished second in the Coppa Principessa di Piemonte. A year later he came twelfth in the Mille Miglia, but he obtained his greatest success after World War II. After the World War II abruptly ended his career, as well as that of his colleagues of the time. Bonetto resumed his racing in 1946 with the small Cisitalia, before moving into Formula One.

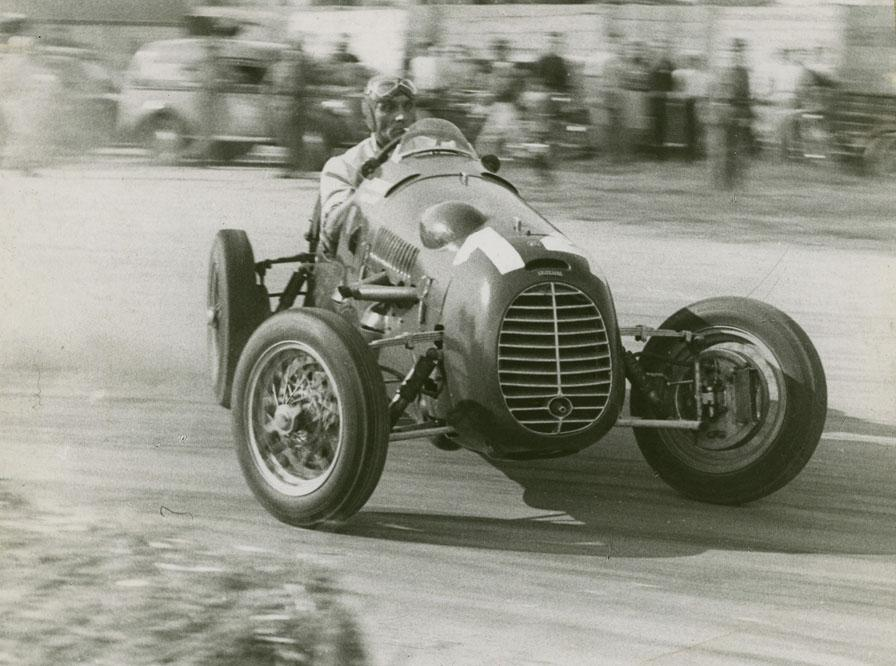
Bonetto at the wheel of a Cisitalia D46 in 1948

=== Formula One ===
Although Bonetto had raced Formula One cars before, he made his World Championship F1 debut in the 1950 Swiss Grand Prix. He was five days short of his 47th birthday. He entered his own Maserati 4CLT in several Grands Prix, under the Scuderia Milano banner, and drove a works Alfa Romeo SpA in 1951, as their number three driver. He shared a third, with Giuseppe Farina in the Gran Premio d'Italia. A move to sports cars followed, but he returned to Formula One at the end of 1952 and had a good season in the Officine Alfieri Maserati in 1953, with a visit to the podium, when he again shared a third-place finish in the Grote Prijs van Nederland. This time partnered by José Froilán González. Away from the World Championship, Bonetto did have some success; he was second in the 1949 in the Gran Premio di Napoli in a Ferrari.

=== Ace of sport ===
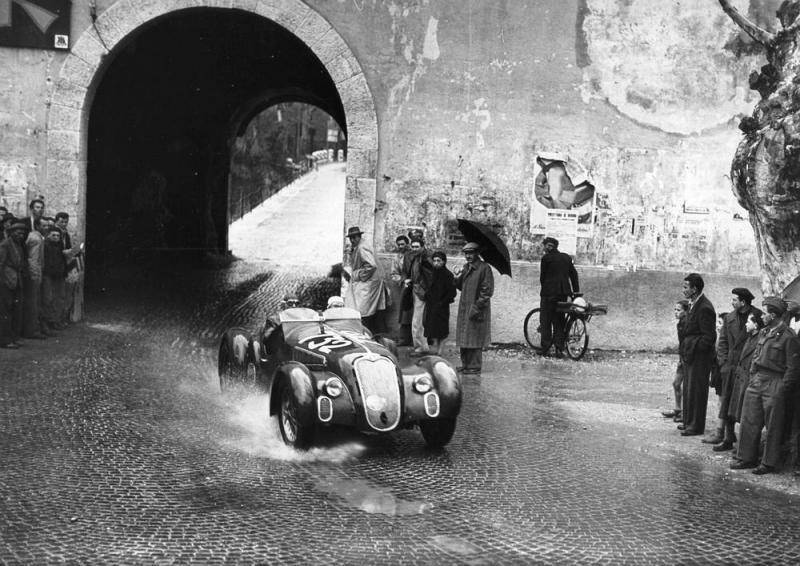
Bonetto and Casnaghi in Alfa Romeo 412 Touring Spider during 1950 Mille Miglia

More than F1, however, Bonetto had greater success in sports cars. He won the 1947 Circuito de Firenze driving a Delage 3000. In 1949 he was second in the Mille Miglia, behind Clemente Biondetti, both drove a Ferrari 166 MM Touring for Scuderia Ferrari, and in 1950 he won the Pontedecimo-Giovi hillclimb in an Osca and the Gran Premio di Oporto in his own Alfa Romeo. The following season, he drove for Alfa Romeo's new 1900TI model to class victory in the Giro di Sicilia. Then for 1952, he moved to Scuderia Lancia, and at the wheel of a Lancia Aurelia B20, he finished second on the Giro di Sicilia. He followed this with a sixth place in the Preis von Bremgarten and an eighth in the les 24 Heures du Mans, and finally a great win in the Targa Florio. He continued with the Scuderia Lancia outfit for 1953; claiming third in the Mille Miglia, second in the Gran Premio di Monza, victory in the Grande Premio do Jubileu at the Circuito de Monsanto and he became part of the squadron deployed to the Carrera Panamericana: his teammates for the race were Juan Manuel Fangio, Piero Taruffi, Giovanni Bracco and Eugenio Castellotti.

=== Death ===
The Carrera Panamericana, a notoriously dangerous and difficult public road rally in Mexico that took place over 6 days from one end of the North American country to the other, covering a distance of 2,000 miles (3,200 km). It was the last round of the 1953 World Sportscar Championship, and the race started on 19 November 1953, from Tuxtla Gutiérrez; Bonetto won the first stage, in front of his teammates Taruffi, Fangio and Castellotti. Taruffi would win the next two stages, although Bonetto remained in control. The third day of competition, Bonetto and Taruffi were close and continued to duel with each other; the second stage of the day, however, Taruffi went off the road in the foggy area before the small town of Silao, about 25 miles from León, damaging the steering of his Lancia. In the same locality, Bonetto crashed his Lancia against the balcony of a house, ending up against a pole. Bonetto hit his head on the balcony at speed and was killed instantly. Prior to the event, Bonetto with Taruffi and other Italian drivers reportedly marked dangerous corners along the route with blue signs. His accident happened at one of those locations – despite this care in marking the corners, Felice would take a 60 mph corner at 125 mph. After Bonetto's death, team owner Gianni Lancia wanted to withdraw his cars from the race, but the surviving drivers decided to keep on racing in honour of their teammate. Fangio, Taruffi and Castellotti led to the finish giving Lancia first three places, but it was a success that was not rejoiced, as besides Bonetto the race also claimed the lives of fellow Italian drivers, Antonio Stagnoli and Giuseppe Scotuzzi, as well as six spectators. Bonetto is buried in the Cimitero Italiano section of the Panteón Civil de Dolores, México City.

=== Bonetto family in the automotive world ===
The contribution of the Bonetto family to the automotive world did not end with the death of Bonetto. His nephew, Rodolfo Bonetto, was a leading figure in the field of Italian architecture and industrial design. Rodolfo's son, Marco, continued in this field as chairman of Bonetto Design. Felice's own son, Roberto Bonetto, dedicated his career to journalism, to become deputy editor of Quattroruote.

== Racing record ==
=== Career highlights ===
Season	Series	Position	Team	Car
1933	Coppa Principessa di Piemonte	2nd		Alfa Romeo 8C 2600
	Gran Premio di Monza	2nd		Alfa Romeo 8C 2600
1947	Coppa Asti Spumante	1st	Cisitalia SpA	Cisitalia-Fiat D46
	Circuito di Vigevano	1st	Cisitalia SpA	Cisitalia-Fiat D46
	Circuito di Firenze	1st		Delage 3000
	Italian 1500cc u/s Championship	3rd	Cisitalia SpA	Cisitalia-Fiat D46
	Circuito di Pescara, Coppa Acerbo	3rd		Maserati A6 Sport
1948	Gran Premio di Apertura	1st	Cisitalia SpA	Cisitalia-Fiat D46
	Coppa Giorgio e Alberto Nuvolari	1st	Cisitalia SpA	Cisitalia-Fiat D46
	Gran Premio di Bari, Coppa Brasile	2nd	Cisitalia SpA	Cisitalia-Fiat D46
	Prix de Berna	3rd	Squardra Peiro Dusio	Cisitalia-Fiat D46
1949	Mille Miglia	2nd	Scuderia Ferrari	Ferrari 166 MM Barchetta Touring
	Gran Premio di Napoli	2nd	Scuderia Ferrari	Ferrari 166 MM Touring
	Gran Premio dell'Autodromo di Monza	2nd	Scuderia Ferrari	Ferrari 166 C
	Gran Premio di Bari	3rd	Felice Bonetto	Ferrari 166 C
1950	Gran Premio di Oporto	1st		Alfa Romeo 412
	Pontedecimo-Giovi	1st		Osca
	FIA Formula One World Championship	19th	Scuderia Milano	Maserati 4CLT/50; Milano-Speluzzi
1951	Gran Premio d'Italia	3rd	Alfa Romeo SpA	Alfa Romeo 159A
	FIA Formula One World Championship	8th	Alfa Romeo SpA	Alfa Romeo 159A; Alfa Romeo 159M
1952	Targa Florio	1st		Lancia Aurelia B20 Competitzione
	Giro di Sicilia	2nd		Lancia Aurelia B20
	FIA Formula One World Championship	16th	Officine Alfieri Maserati	Maserati A6GCM
1953	Grande Premio do Jubileu	1st	Scuderia Lancia	Lancia D23
	Gran Premio dell'Autodromo di Monza	2nd	Scuderia Lancia	Lancia D23
	Mille Miglia	3rd	Scuderia Lancia	Lancia D20 Berlinetta Pinin Farina
	Grote Prjs van Nederland	3rd	Officine Alfieri Maserati	Maserati A6GCM/53
	FIA Formula One World Championship	9th	Officine Alfieri Maserati	Maserati A6GCM/53

=== Complete Formula One World Championship results ===
(key)

Year	Entrant	Chassis	Engine	1	2	3	4	5	6	7	8	9	WDC	Points
1950	Scuderia Milano	Maserati 4CLT/50	Maserati Straight-4	GBR; DNA	MON	500	SUI; 5	BEL	FRA; Ret				19th	2
1950	Scuderia Milano	Milano Speluzzi	Maserati Straight-4							ITA; DNS			19th	2
1951	Alfa Romeo SpA	Alfa Romeo 159A	Alfa Romeo Straight-8	SUI	500	BEL	FRA	GBR; 4	GER; Ret	ITA; 3			8th	7
1951	Alfa Romeo SpA	Alfa Romeo 159M	Alfa Romeo Straight-8								ESP; 5		8th	7
1952	Officine Alfieri Maserati	Maserati A6GCM	Maserati Straight-6	SUI	500	BEL	FRA	GBR	GER; DSQ	NED	ITA; 5		16th	2
1953	Officine Alfieri Maserati	Maserati A6GCM	Maserati Straight-6	ARG; Ret	500	NED; 3^{‡}	BEL	FRA; Ret	GBR; 6	GER; 4	SUI; 4^{†}	ITA; Ret	9th	6.5

==== Notes ====
‡ Shared drive with José Froilán González
† Shared drive with Juan Manuel Fangio

=== Complete 24 Hours of Le Mans results ===
Year	Team	Co-Drivers	Car	Class	Laps	Pos.	Class Pos.
1952	(France) Louis Rosier	(France) Louis Rosier	Talbot-Lago T26C	S5.0	92	DNF; Oil tank	
1953	(Italy) Scuderia Lancia	(Italy) Enrico Anselmi	Lancia Aurelia B20	S2.0	247	8th	2nd
1953	(Italy) Scuderia Lancia	(Italy) Gino Valenzano	Lancia D20	S8.0	66	DNF (Starter)	

=== Complete Mille Miglia results ===
Year	Team	Co-Drivers/Navigator	Car	Class	Pos.	Class Pos.
1934		(Italy) A. Negri	Alfa Romeo 8C 2300	S3.0	12th	8th
1948		(Italy) Milto Maritano	Cisitalia 202 SMM	S1.1	DNF	
1949	(Italy) Scuderia Ferrari	(Italy) Carpani	Ferrari 166 MM	S+1.1	2nd	2nd
1950	(Italy) Felice Bonetto	(Italy) G. Casnaghi	Alfa Romeo 412 Spider Touring	S+2.0	DNF	
1951	(Italy) Felice Bonetto	(Italy) G. Casnaghi	Alfa Romeo 412 Spider Vignale	S/GT+2.0	6th	3rd
1952	(Italy) Felice Bonetto	(Italy) Gian Paolo Voplini	Lancia Aurelia B20	GT2.0	DNF	
1953	(Italy) Scuderia Lancia	(Italy) U. Peruzzi	Lancia D20 Pinin Farina	S+2.0	3rd	

=== Complete Carrera Panamericana results ===
Year	Team	Co-Drivers/Navigator	Car	Class	Pos.	Class Pos.
1950	(Italy) Automobile Club d'Italia	(Italy) Bruno Bonini	Alfa Romeo 6C 2500		8th	n/a
1951	(Italy)	(Italy) Gian Paolo Volpini	Lancia Aurelia B20		DNF	n/a
1952	(Italy) Felice Bonetto		Lancia Aurelia B20	S	DNF (Accident)	
1953	(Italy) Scuderia Lancia		Lancia D24	S+1.6	DNF (Fatal accident – Bonetto)	

== Notes ==
Sporting positions
Preceded by Franco Cortese	Targa Florio; 1952	Succeeded by Umberto Maglioli
