= Solana (surname) =

Solana is a Spanish surname. Notable people with the surname include:

- Javier Solana (born 1942), Spanish physicist, politician and diplomat
- Fernando Solana (1931–2016), Mexican diplomat and politician
- Jesús Ángel Solana (born 1964), Spanish football player and coach
- Moisés Solana (1935–1969), Mexican racing driver
