= Danny Graves (racing driver) =

American racing driver (1924–1965)

- Born: Frank Danley; January 22, 1924; Modesto, California
- Died: December 31, 1965 (aged 41)

NASCAR Cup Series career
- 9 races run over 2 years
- Best finish: 44th (1957)
- First race: 1957 Race 18 (Portland)
- Last race: 1958 Race 44 (Sacramento)
- First win: 1957 Race 43 (Sacramento)
Wins	Top tens	Poles
1	4	1

ARCA Menards Series West career
- 28 races run over 4 years
- Best finish: 7th (1957)
- First race: 1957 Gardena Stadium 150 (Gardena)
- Last race: 1965 Portland 150 (Portland)
- First win: 1957 Race 10 (Saugus)
- Last win: 1957 Race 23 (Sacramento)
Wins	Top tens	Poles
3	18	3
- Statistics up to date as of October 25, 2026.

Frank Danley, better known as Danny Graves (January 22, 1924 – December 31, 1965), was an American professional stock car racing driver. He competed in NASCAR in the 1950s and 1960s.

== Racing career ==
Danley competed under the pseudonym Danny Graves when racing. In 1954, he was the NASCAR Late Model Sportsman National Championship champion, winning 51 times.

In 1957, Graves competed in at least sixteen NASCAR Pacific Coast Late Model Division races, scoring wins at Saugus Speedway, Belmont Stadium, and the California State Fairgrounds Race Track, two poles, and ten top-tens. He finished seventh in the standings. Seven of these races were in combination with the NASCAR Grand National Series, including his win at the California State Fairgrounds, his lone Grand National win. Nine of his Pacific Coast Late Model starts were also combination races with the NASCAR Short Track Division, including his wins at Saugus and Belmont.

Graves ran at least seven of nine Pacific Coast Late Model races in 1958, scoring four top-tens, all top-fives. He finished ninth in the standings. In the combination races with the Grand National Series at Riverside International Raceway and the California State Fairgrounds, Graves started second, but finished 35th and 24th respectively due to mechanical problems. These were his final Grand National starts. Five of his Pacific Coast Late Model starts were also combination races with the Short Track Division.

Graves returned to the Pacific Coast Late Model Division in 1964, finishing seventh at Oregon International Raceway and eighth at the Southwest Washington Fairgrounds.

Graves made his final Pacific Coast Late Model starts in 1965, finishing sixth at Portland Speedway and Evergreen Speedway and eighth in another race at Portland.

== Death ==
Graves was killed in a bar fight on New Year's Eve in 1965.
