= Lancia Museum =

Museo Vincenzo Lancia
- Location within Piedmont Location within Italy
- Established: September 20, 2009
- Location: Via Gianni Lancia - Fobello (VC) Italy
- Coordinates: 45°53′N 8°10′E
- Type: Automobile museum

Lancia Museum (in Italian: Museo Vincenzo Lancia) is a museum of the Lancia family and the car brand Lancia. The museum is located in Fobello, Italy.

== History ==
Inaugurated on 20 September 2009, the exhibition is on the second floor of the Palazzo Giuseppe Lancia that Vincenzo Lancia himself built as a school building. The museum is established in the honor of the great engineer Vincenzo Lancia. In the house there are photographs, family trees and documents connected with the family. The museum is divided into four rooms that each carry the name of a well-known Lancia model: Augusta, Artena, Astura and Aprilia.

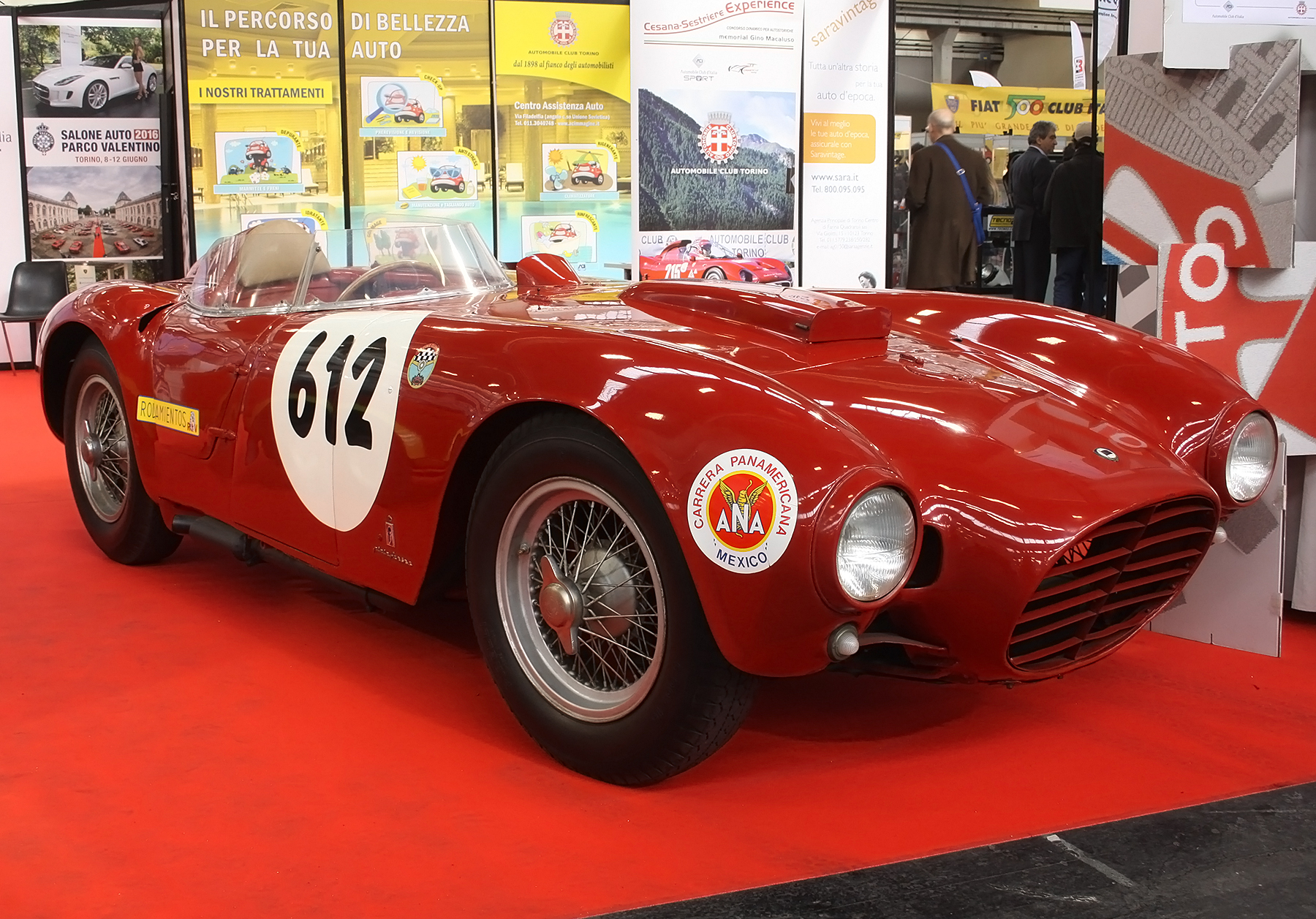
Lancia D24
