= Mr. Horsepower =

Automotive bird mascot

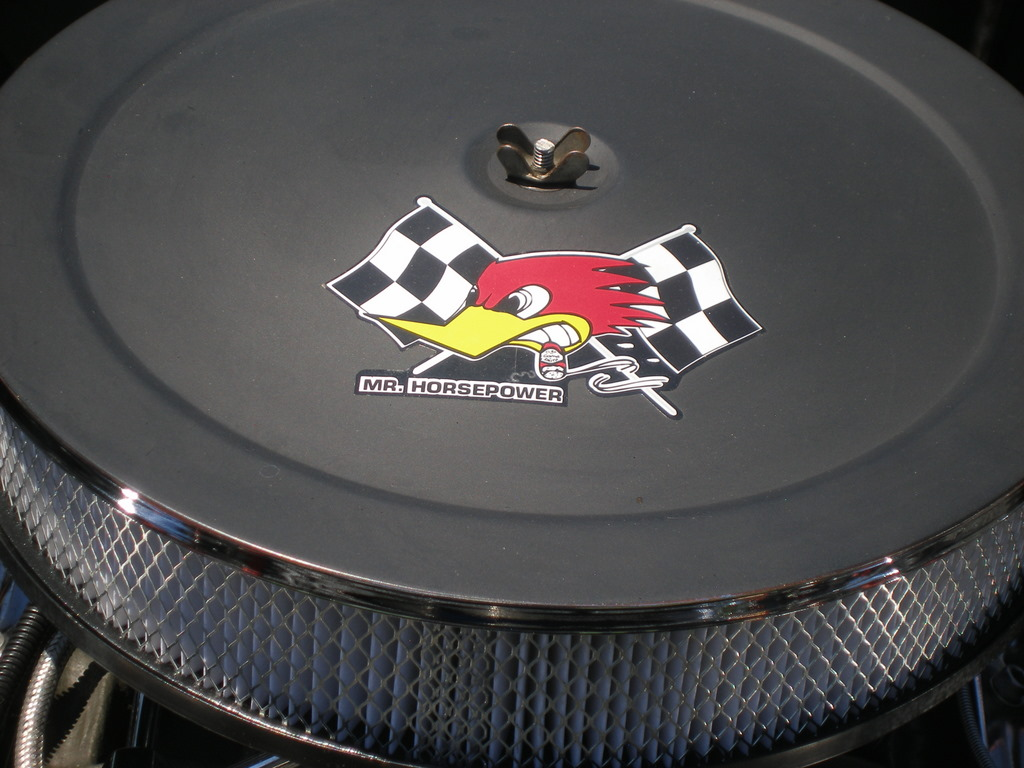
Mr. Horsepower logo on a Corvette engine

Mr. Horsepower is the cartoon mascot and logo of Clay Smith Cams, an American auto shop established in 1931. He is a sneering, cigar-smoking bird with red feathers and a yellow beak. The image is a caricature of legendary hot rod guru Clay Smith (1915–1954), well known for his red hair. Mr. Horsepower is rarely without a cigar, but when he is, he has a "cigar replacement", such as a candy cane for the holidays. The character is well known among car aficionados.

== Origins ==
The origins of Clay Smith Cams can be traced back to the 1930s, when Kansas racing driver Pete Bertrand opened a car tuning shop in Long Beach, California. Clay Smith, just a boy at the time, was employed by Bertrand until the latter's death from pneumonia in 1942. Smith, himself a racing enthusiast, took over the company and continued producing precision engine parts, especially camshafts. In 1952, Smith teamed with Troy Ruttman to win the Indianapolis 500. In 1954, he was killed by a race car that he had helped prepare, while working in the pits on the infield at DuQuoin, Illinois. Clay was one of the early specialist camshaft grinders, and built many race winning engines, for various types of race classes and machines.

Originally a mascot painted on Clay Smith's boats and race cars, Mr. Horsepower became the company logo as the reputation of Smith's fine-tuned auto parts spread. Today, the Mr. Horsepower logo is commonly seen as a car decal, tattoo, t-shirt logo, car mat, or garage clock.

Some people have confused Mr. Horsepower with the cartoon character Woody Woodpecker. The notable points of contrast are that Woody Woodpecker's beak is curved but smooth on top and bottom, and his head-feathers form a well-contained "V" shape in early iterations or a sprout of sorts in newer iterations. Mr. Horsepower also has a similar appearance to the Thrush Exhaust logo. The Thrush logo has hot pink feathers, no gaps between the teeth and lacks the cigar.

== Popular culture ==
- The logo has appeared in video games, most prominently in Sega GT 2002 for the Xbox video game console.
- The logo decorates the guitar of Mike Ness of Social Distortion.
- The guitar of Spinal Tap's Nigel Tufnel is decorated with Mr. Horsepower on the body and also on the headstock.
- The logo has also appeared in the Coen brothers' Raising Arizona, where the protagonist, H.I., and the antagonist, Leonard Smalls, both had similar tattoos though not identical to that of the Thrush Exhaust bird logo.
- The logo has also appeared in a wide range of films, including Spider-Man and Gone in 60 Seconds.
- The logo can be seen on countless hot rods and customs.

== See also ==
- Rat Fink
- Peckerwood
