= Solana de Rioalmar =

- municipality
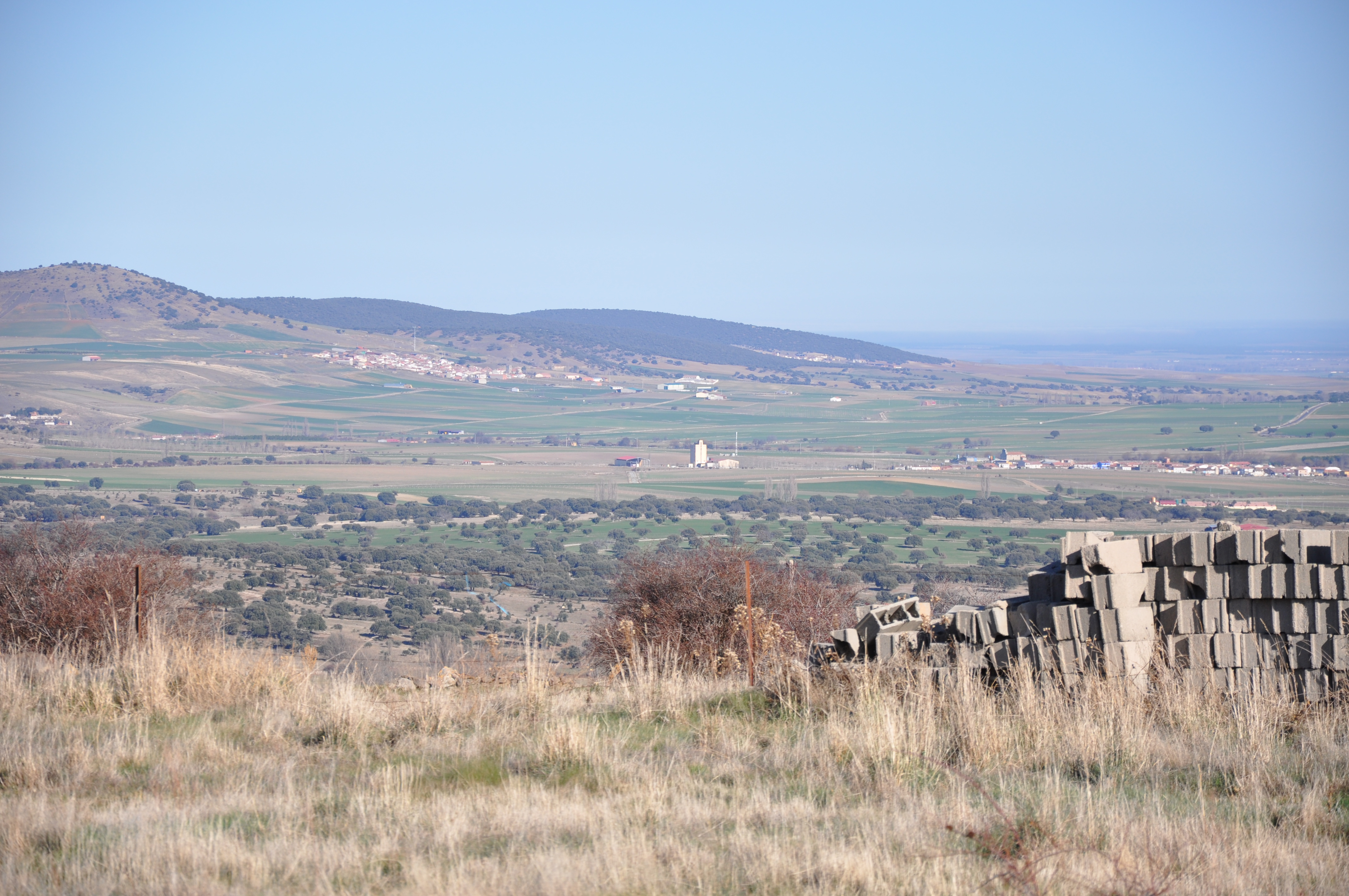
- Solana de Rioalmar from Manjabálago

- Flag Coat of arms

- Location in Spain. Solana de Rioalmar (Spain)
- Coordinates: 40°44′14″N 5°00′38″W
- Country: Spain
- Autonomous community: Castile and León
- Autonomous community: Ávila
- Municipality: Solana de Rioalmar

Area
  - Total: 37 km^{2} (14 sq mi)

Population (2025-01-01)
  - Total: 141
  - Density: 3.8/km^{2} (9.9/sq mi)
- Time zone: UTC+1 (CET)
  - Summer (DST): UTC+2 (CEST)
- Website: Official website

Solana de Rioalmar is a municipality located in the province of Ávila, Castile and León, Spain.

== Population ==
Historical population
Year	Pop.	±% p.a.
2023	149	—
2024	138	−7.38%
2025	141	+2.17%
Source: INE
