= Solana (automobile) =

- Type: Private
- Industry: Design; Automotive
- Founded: 1936; 90 years ago
- Headquarters: Mexico City, Mexico,
- Key people: Joaquín Solana
- Products: Automobiles
- Website: Solana Sports Cars

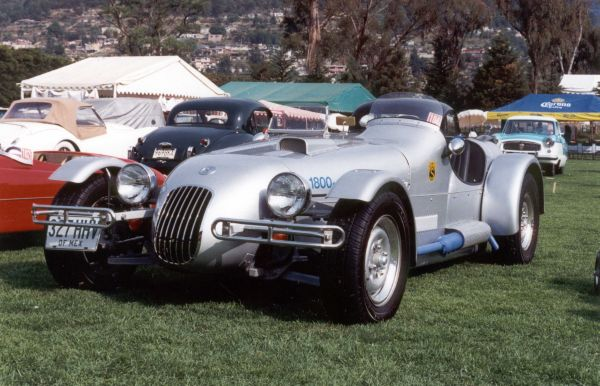
1996 Solana Sport Series II

Solana is a Mexican cottage manufacturer of sports, racing, and kids' automobiles based in Mexico City. The family run company has operated since 1936, with a total production of fewer than fifty cars; the majority of them one-offs. The family is heavily involved in motor sports; the most prominent member was Moisés Solana, who raced family-built cars and later in Formula One.

== History ==
Operating since 1936, the company had built a total of forty-two cars until 2003. Many of the early cars were actually meant for children, using small single-cylinder engines. Others were single-seater racing specials. The Deportivo Series II has been available since 1998, after having first been shown at a concours in Huixquilucan (Dos Ríos), in May 1996. This car, built on a tubular space frame, utilizes a 1.8 litre Datsun engine. It was built by Joaquín and Javier Solana and inspired by a 1954 special built by Javier for the Carrera Panamericana. The carburetted engine only has 60 hp (45 kW), which is supposedly enough for a 195 km/h (121 mph) top speed.

== Logo ==
Solana's logo is a circled "S" with a squared segment on top, containing the "Solana" name. It is colored black and gold. Some cars have a round logo with an "S" in it instead.

== See also ==
- Cars in Mexico
