= André Moynet =

French businessman and politician (1921–1993)

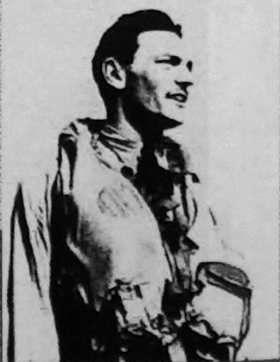

Member of the National Assembly of France representing Saône-et-Loire
- In office 1946–1967

Secretary of State for Sport with responsibility for coordinating the Problems of Youth
- In office 12 November 1954 – 1955 or 1956

Mayor of Biot
- In office 1971–1977

Personal details
- Born: 19 July 1921 Saint-Mandé (Val-de-Marne), France
- Died: 2 May 1993 (aged 71) Nice (Alpes-Maritimes), France
- Party: Républicains indépendants (1946–1955); National Centre of Independents and Peasants (1956–1962); Independent Republicans (1962–1966)

André Moynet (19 July 1921 – 2 May 1993) was a French aviator, politician, and businessman. Moynet began his career as a fighter pilot, serving in World War II. Moynet later worked as a test pilot. Elected as a Deputy of the National Assembly of France in 1946, Moynet would later serve as a member of the Mendès Government, and as mayor of Biot, France.

== Biography ==
Moynet volunteered for military service on 26 December 1939, becoming a fighter pilot. As a member of the Normandie-Niémen squadron he recorded 115 aerial missions accounting for 150 wartime flying hours.

Moynet entered politics in 1946, initially as an independent deputy representing Saône-et-Loire. On 12 November 1954, he was appointed a member of the Mendès France government, as a secretary of state and Secretary of State for Sport with responsibility for coordinating the Problems of Youth.

On 17 November 1956, a demonstration flight of the Hurel-Dubois HD.321 piloted by Moynet crashed in Guanabara Bay, Brazil, killing one passenger, Brazilian Air Force Captain Newton de Campos. Moynet survived the crash with serious injuries.

Simultaneously with his political career, Moynet continued his aviation career as a test pilot, participating in the development of Sud Aviation’s Caravelle. Moynet also worked for Matra, giving his name to the Moynet M.360 Jupiter, a small propeller driven aircraft.

Moynet was instrumental in Matra’s move into the automobile business, being responsible for the conception and development in 1968 of a Sports prototype which was developed to achieve a class win (1600–2000 cc) at Le Mans in 1975 (drivers: Michèle Mouton, Marianne Hoepfner and Christine Dacremont). He had previously driven a D.B. to victory in the S750 class at the 1953 24 Hours of Le Mans, alongside the D.B. marque's co-founder René Bonnet.

In 1968 Moynet was made a colonel in the French Air Force.

Relocating to southern France, he was elected mayor of the small town of Biot in 1971, holding office for a full term until 1977. He died in Nice on 2 May 1993, and his funeral was held in Antibes. He is buried in the cemetery of Biot.

== Honours ==
• Grand Officer of the Légion d'honneur
• Compagnon de la Libération (Decree : 17 November 1945)
• Croix de guerre 1939–1945
• Médaille de la Résistance
• Médaille de l'Aéronautique
• Silver Star (USA)
• Air Medal (USA)
• Order of War for National Salvation (1st, 2nd and 3rd class) (Soviet Union)
• Order of the Red Banner (Soviet Union)
• Medal of the Resistance (Poland)
• Order of the White Eagle (Serbia)
• Order of Aeronautical Merit (Brazil)

== Bibliography ==
- Leconte, Claude-Henry (1955). André Moynet, Pilote de combat. Paris: Éditions de la pensée moderne.
