= Auguste Veuillet =

French racing driver and team owner

- Born: Auguste Clément Louis Veuillet; 3 July 1910; Lyon, France
- Died: 10 October 1980 (aged 70); Paris, France

24 Hours of Le Mans career
- Years: 1949, 1951 – 1953, 1955
- Teams: A. Veuillet; Porsche KG
- Best finish: 11th (1952)
- Class wins: 3 (1951, 1952, 1955)

Auguste Veuillet (3 July 1910 – 10 October 1980), known as Toto Veuillet, was a French racing driver and founder of Sonauto, France's first importer of Porsche cars and Yamaha motorcycles. He drove Porsche's first Le Mans entry and took their first two class wins along with Edmond Mouche.

== Racing career ==
Veuillet drove an MG to class victory in the 1945 Coupe de Paris at Bois de Boulogne.

He later purchased a Delage D6 three-litre and raced it at the 1948 Paris Grand Prix at Montlhéry, but did not finish. He raced the car in the 1948 Grand Prix des Frontières but retired after spinning and damaging his radiator. He entered the car to the 24 Hours of Spa, where he won his class alongside Maurice Varet. The pair then entered the 12 Hours of Paris at Montlhéry but did not finish.

In 1949, Veuillet and Edmond Mouche made their first attempt at the 24 Hours of Le Mans in Veuillet's Delage. The pair ran in third position for most of the race, only to retire with an engine fire in the closing hours. The same year, Veuillet placed fourth in class in the Comminges Grand Prix, and finished third and second in two races in Saarbrücken.

Veuillet took his Delage to the 1950 Paris Grand Prix but retired with suspension failure on the second lap. He entered Le Mans in a Delahaye, but rolled it during practice the day before the race. It was repaired overnight but would not start, owing to a flat battery. Later that year he raced his Delage at Rouen, placing ninth overall.

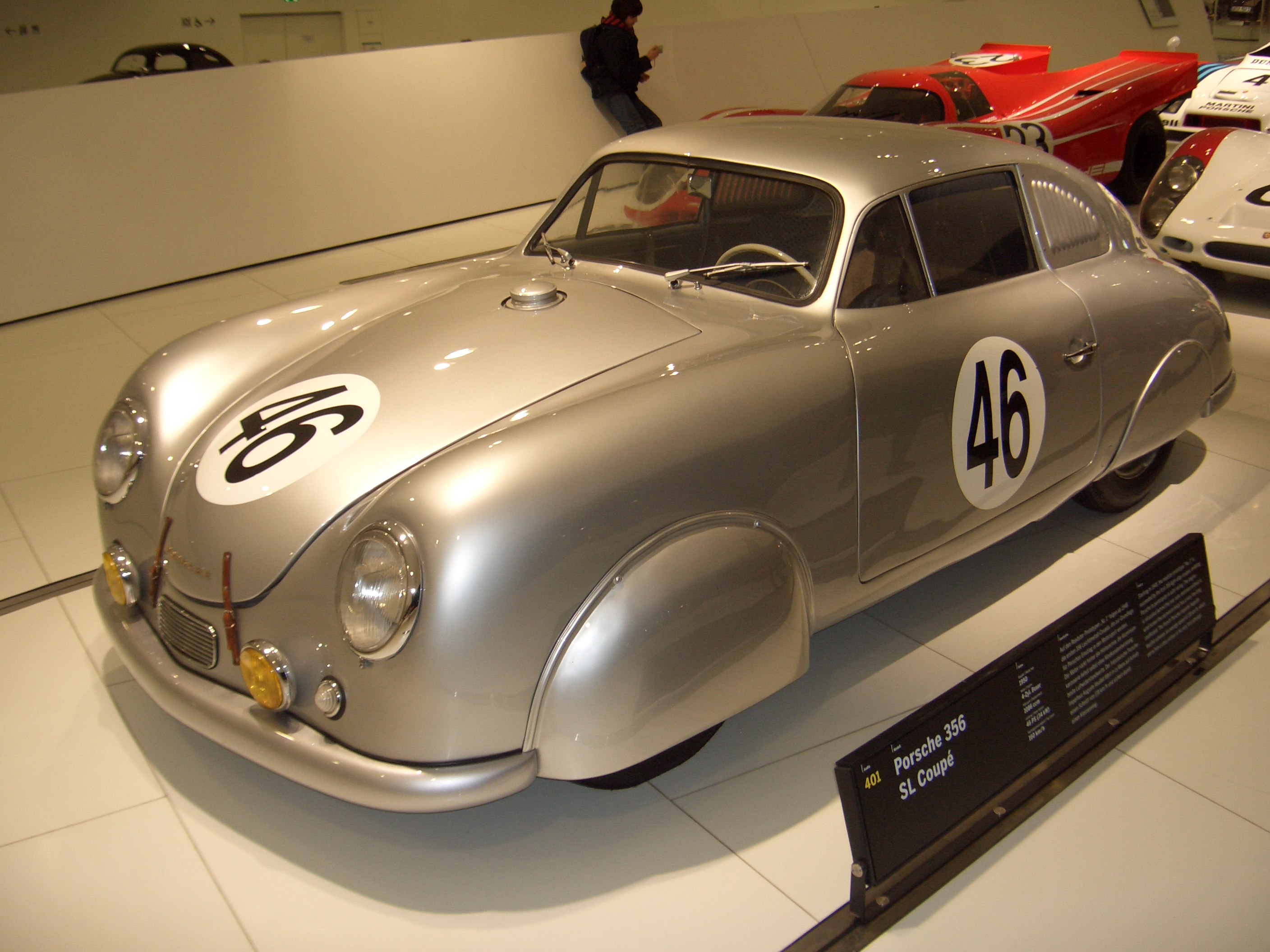
The Porsche 356/4 SL Coupé driven to class victory in the 1951 24 Hours of Le Mans by Veuillet and Edmond Mouche on the brand's first attempt.

In 1951, Veuillet and his company Sonauto helped Porsche make their first entry to Le Mans with two 356 SL Coupes. The sister car of Rudolf Sauerwein and Robert Brunet crashed out in practice, but Veuillet and Mouche came through to win the S1.1 class, giving Porsche their first class win on their first attempt. Veuillet later drove a 356 in the Coupes du Salon at Montlhéry, winning the GT1.5 race.

In 1952, Veuillet won the Circuit International de Vitesse in Bordeaux behind the wheel of a 356, before returning with Mouche to Le Mans and repeating their S1.1 class victory. He also competed in a 100-mile race for Porsche 356s at the Nürburgring supporting that year's German Grand Prix, but his result is unknown.

Veuillet began 1953 by racing at Nîmes. He joined forces with Gonzague Olivier for the first time to compete in the 12 Hours of Hyères. The pair finished fourth overall and won their class. Veuillet returned to Le Mans as part of the Porsche works team, this time sharing a car with Petermax Müller, but retired in the 18th hour with engine failure. He placed second at Rouen, and retired from the Caen Grand Prix.

In 1954, he returned to Nîmes and finished second overall. He reunited with Olivier to drive a Porsche 550 in the 12 Hours of Reims, finishing second in class. He raced in the Coupes du Salon at Montlhéry, but his result is unknown.

Veuillet's and Olivier's greatest outright win was the 1955 Bol d'Or at Montlhéry, in what would be the final running of the 24-hour event. The circuit was notoriously demanding on a car, but the pair praised each other's calm and measured approach to such a long and challenging race. They returned to the 12 Hours of Hyères and repeated their class victory. Olivier entered him for Le Mans in one of his privateer Porsches, but he was again offered a works drive. He raced alongside Zora Arkus-Duntov to score his third class win for Porsche. The following week, he finished sixth in the Tunis Grand Prix.

In 1956, he drove with Claude Storez in the 1000 km de Paris at Montlhéry, and the pair finished third in class. Two weeks later, they competed together in Storez's privateer Porsche 550 in the Supercortemaggiore Grand Prix at Monza, taking fifth in class. He raced at the Grand Prix of Rouen but did not finish. Veuillet and Olivier entered Le Mans in Olivier's privateer Porsche again, but the car ended up being driven by Storez and Helmut Polensky. Veuillet rounded out the year with an eighth-place finish in the Coupes du Salon.

Veuillet finished second in a race at Saint-Étienne in 1957, fifth in the 1958 Pau Grand Prix, and third in class in the 3 Hours of Rouen in 1960.

== Sonauto ==
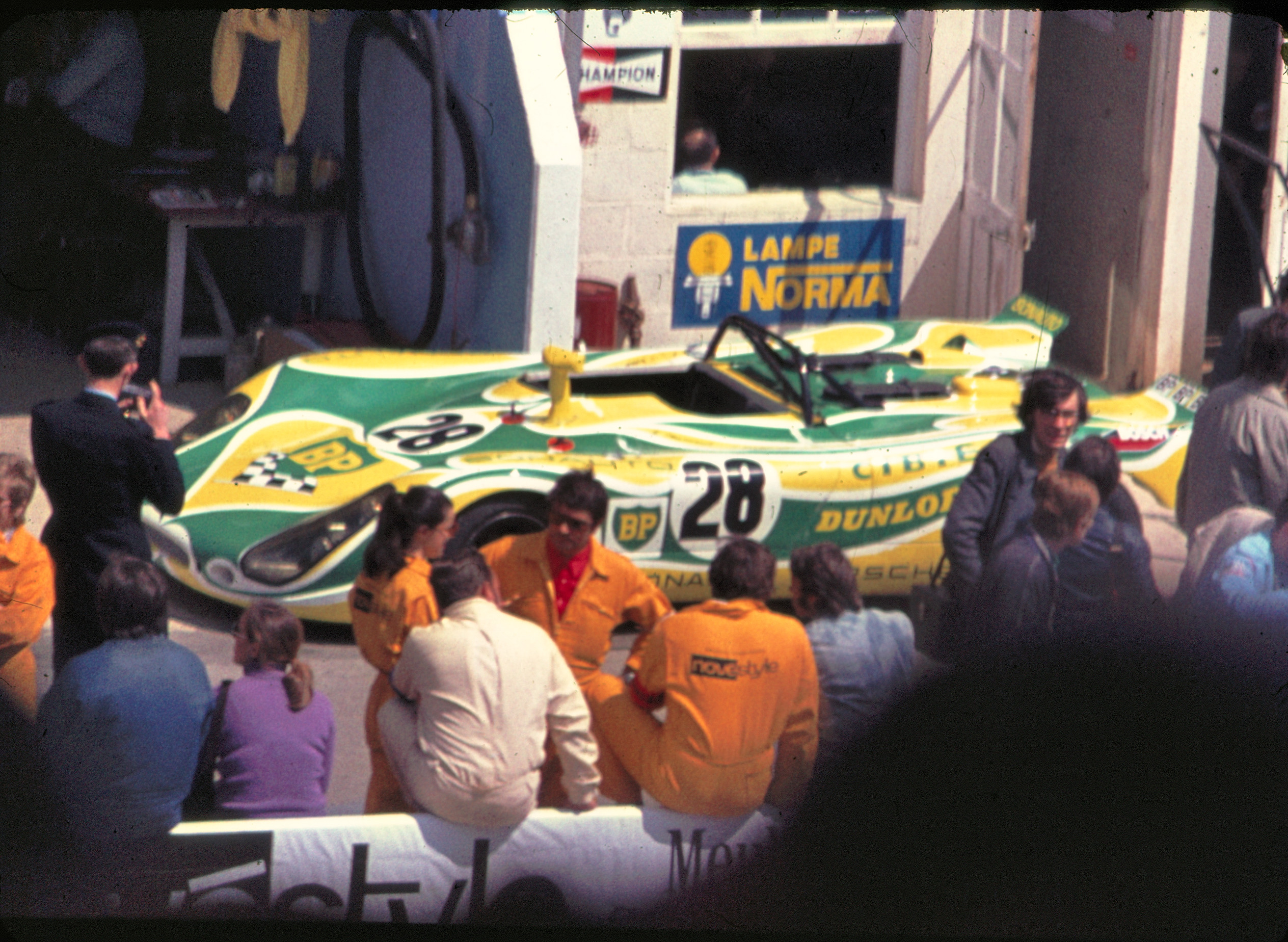
The Porsche 908/2 entered by Sonauto and driven by Claude Ballot-Léna and Guy Chasseuil in the 1971 24 Hours of Le Mans.

Veuillet founded the company Saône-Auto (later becoming Sonauto) in July 1947, selling luxury vehicles from a showroom on Rue de la Boétie in Paris. He became the first French recipient of a Porsche 356 in 1950 and, after meeting Prof. Ferdinand Porsche at the Paris Motor Show in October, agreed to bring the manufacturer to Le Mans in 1951. Although Prof. Porsche suffered a stroke soon after and died in early 1951, thus could not witness his brand's success at Le Mans, his son Ferry established a lasting relationship with Sonauto and entrusted them with the distribution rights to Porsche road cars in France. The company moved to a new premises on Rue Paul Valéry. In 1965 he hired Jean-Claude Olivier, the son of Gonzague, who established the company as France's first Yamaha motorcycle importer, which led to success at the 1979 Paris–Dakar Rally.

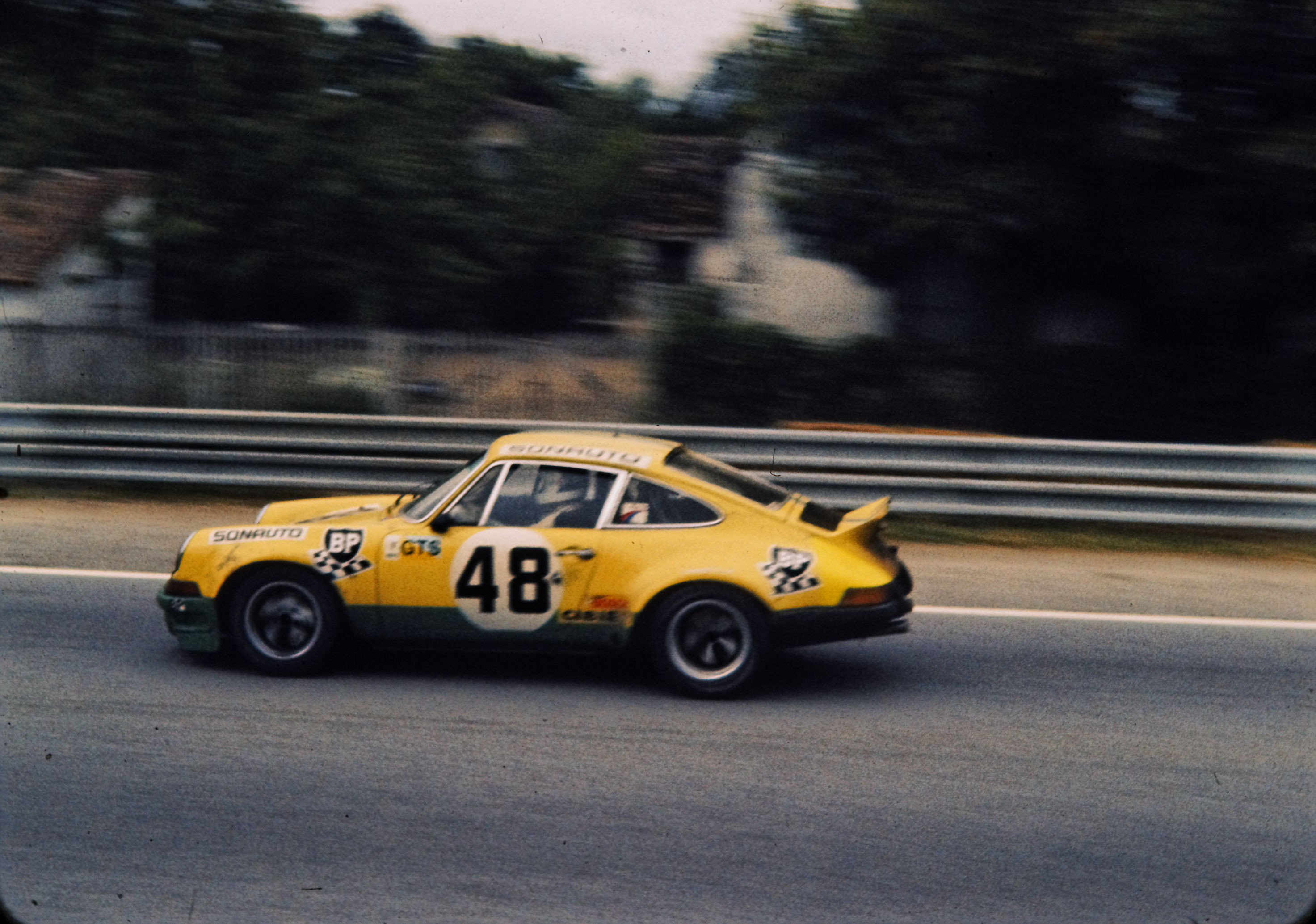
The last car entered by Sonauto to Le Mans, a Porsche 911 Carrera RSR driven by Peter Gregg and Guy Chasseuil in 1973.

Veuillet fielded many privateer entries to Le Mans after his career as a driver ended. He drove his car in the official test before the 1961 event but did not take part in the race. In 1964, he swept the GT2.0 class with a Porsche 904 driven by Robert Buchet and Guy Ligier, and the P+5.0 class with an Iso Grifo driven by Pierre Noblet and Edgar Berney. His entry also won the GT2.0 class in 1967, driven by Buchet and Herbert Linge. For 1970, his team became an official Sonauto entry and they were rewarded with another GT2.0 class win, with drivers Claude Ballot-Léna and Guy Chasseuil. In 1971, Sonauto's entry won the three-hour race held at the official test weekend but crashed out of the 24-hour race. The team made their last appearance at Le Mans in 1973.

Sonauto also won the 24 Hours of Spa in 1969, with a Porsche 911 driven by Chasseuil and Ballot-Léna.

Veuillet continued to manage Sonauto until he retired in 1976.

== Racing record ==
=== Complete 24 Hours of Le Mans results ===
Year	Team	Co-Drivers	Car	Class	Laps	Pos.	Class Pos.
1949	(France) Auguste Veuillet (private entrant)	(France) Edmond Mouche	Delage D6-3L	S 3.0	208	DNF (Engine / fire)	
1951	(Germany) Porsche K.G.	(France) Edmond Mouche	Porsche 356 SL Coupe	S 1.1	210	19th	1st
1952	(Germany) Porsche KG	(France) Edmond Mouche	Porsche 356 SL	S 1.1	220	11th	1st
1953	(West Germany) Porsche KG	(Germany) Petermax Müller	Porsche 356 SL	S 1.1	147	DNF (Engine)	
1955	(Germany) Porsche KG	(United States) Zora Arkus-Duntov	Porsche 550 RS Spyder	S 1.1	245	13th	1st

=== Complete 24 Hours of Spa results ===
Year	Team	Co-Drivers	Car	Class	Laps	Pos.	Class Pos.
1948	(France) Auguste Veuillet (private entrant)	(France) Maurice Varet	Delage D6-3L	S 3.0	175	6th	1st

=== Complete 12 Hours of Reims results ===
Year	Team	Co-Drivers	Car	Class	Laps	Pos.	Class Pos.
1954	Sonauto	(France) Gonzague Olivier	Porsche 550 RS Spyder	S 1.5	193	13th	2nd

=== Complete 12 Hours of Hyères results ===
Year	Team	Co-Drivers	Car	Class	Laps	Pos.	Class Pos.
1953		(France) Gonzague Olivier	Porsche 356	S 1.5	180	4th	1st
1955		(France) Gonzague Olivier	Porsche 550 RS Spyder	S 1.6	214	5th	1st
