= Monopole (company) =

Établissements Monopole
- Industry: Automobile parts
- Fate: Acquired
- Headquarters: Poissy, France
- Key people: Jean de Montrémy; Jean Hémard

Établissements Monopole was a French manufacturing company that produced parts for automobile engines. The company also built and raced a series of small displacement endurance racing cars. After a series of mergers and acquisitions the Monopole name was retired in Europe, but survives in Africa in the name of a former licensee.

== History ==
"Établissements SIM SA" was a company based in Morges, Switzerland that operated a foundry and machine shops. In 1920 they used American investment capital to start another company called Établissements Monopole in Poissy on the outskirts of Paris, France. The new company specialised in producing pistons, piston-rings, valves, and other parts for automobile engines, and was managed by a Mr. Guerne. The company's name is abbreviated Ets. Monopole, but "Monopole-Poissy" was used in the company's own literature.

In 1937–38, majority ownership of Monopole was acquired by André Hémard, son of Guy-Aristide Hémard of the Hémard distilling concern that merged his Pernod Fils company with Les Établissements Pernod Père et Fils to form Les Établissements Pernod — Maisons Pernod Fils.

In 1944 Hémard installed his son-in-law Jean de Montrémy, until then working for aeronautical parts manufacturer Bronze-Avia, as Chief Executive Officer (CEO) of Monopole, whose clients by then included Peugeot and Citroën. Hémard's son Jean served as production director. His other son Pierre also worked for the company.

A merger with the Floquet sparkplug company resulted in a name change to Floquet Monopole. Several other companies were later absorbed, including valve maker Jeudy, gudgeon pin maker Marty, and piston maker Nova.

On 1 July 1963, the Perfect Circle Corporation of Hagerstown, Indiana, a maker of piston rings, became a wholly owned subsidiary of Dana Incorporated of Toledo, Ohio. In 1978 Dana completed the acquisition of Floquet Monopole.

As late as the end of October 1995 the Floquet Monopole name remained in use in Europe, but by the beginning of 1998 it had been phased out, and the division was known as Perfect Circle. A former Floquet Monopole licensee purchased the rights to the name from Dana, incorporating as Floquet Monopole Industrie de Précision in Fes, Morocco. Dana announced completion of the sale of the balance of its European parts divisions to Mahle on 9 March 2007.

== Monopole in racing ==
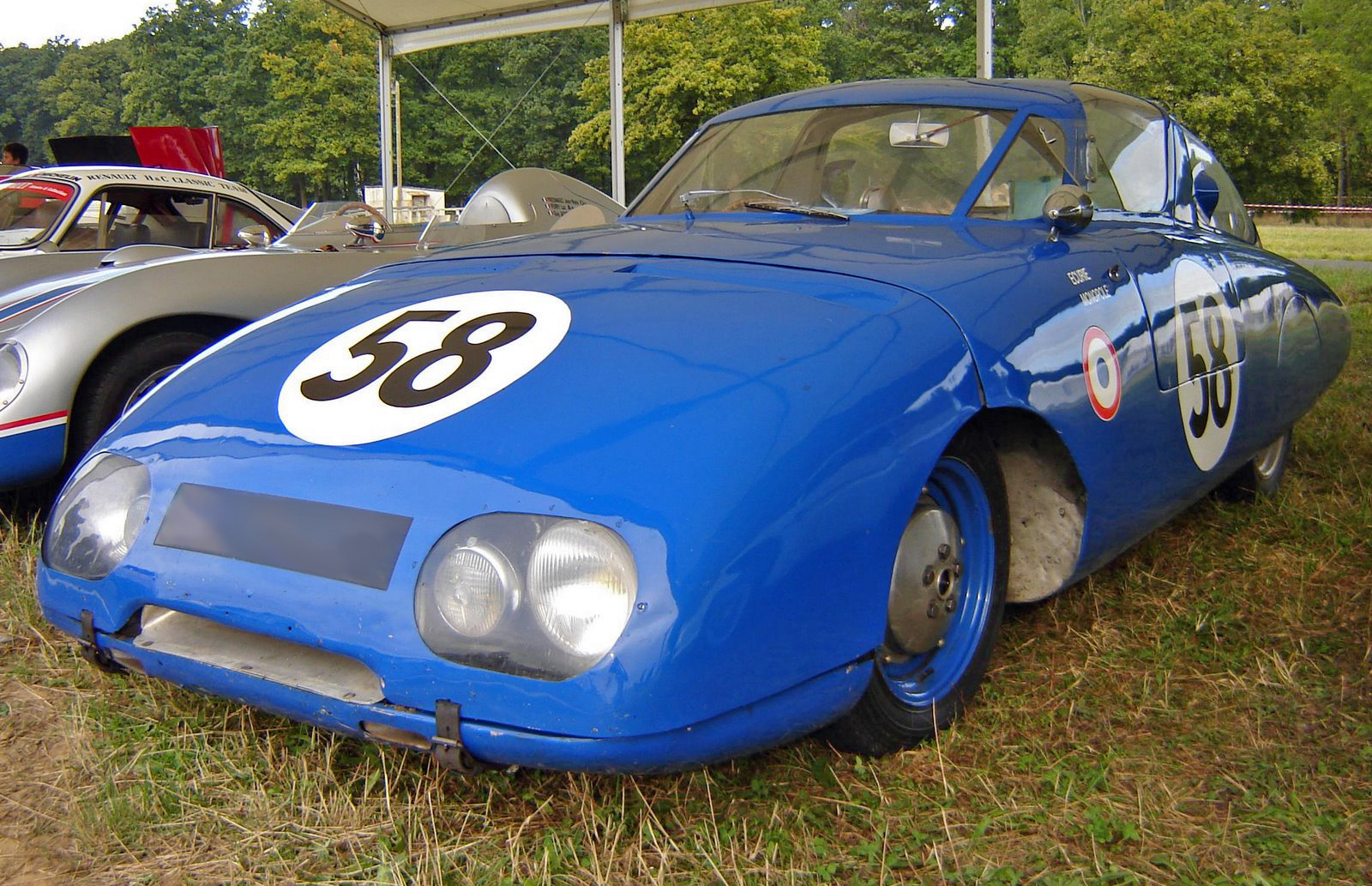
A 1956 Monopole X86 berlinette.

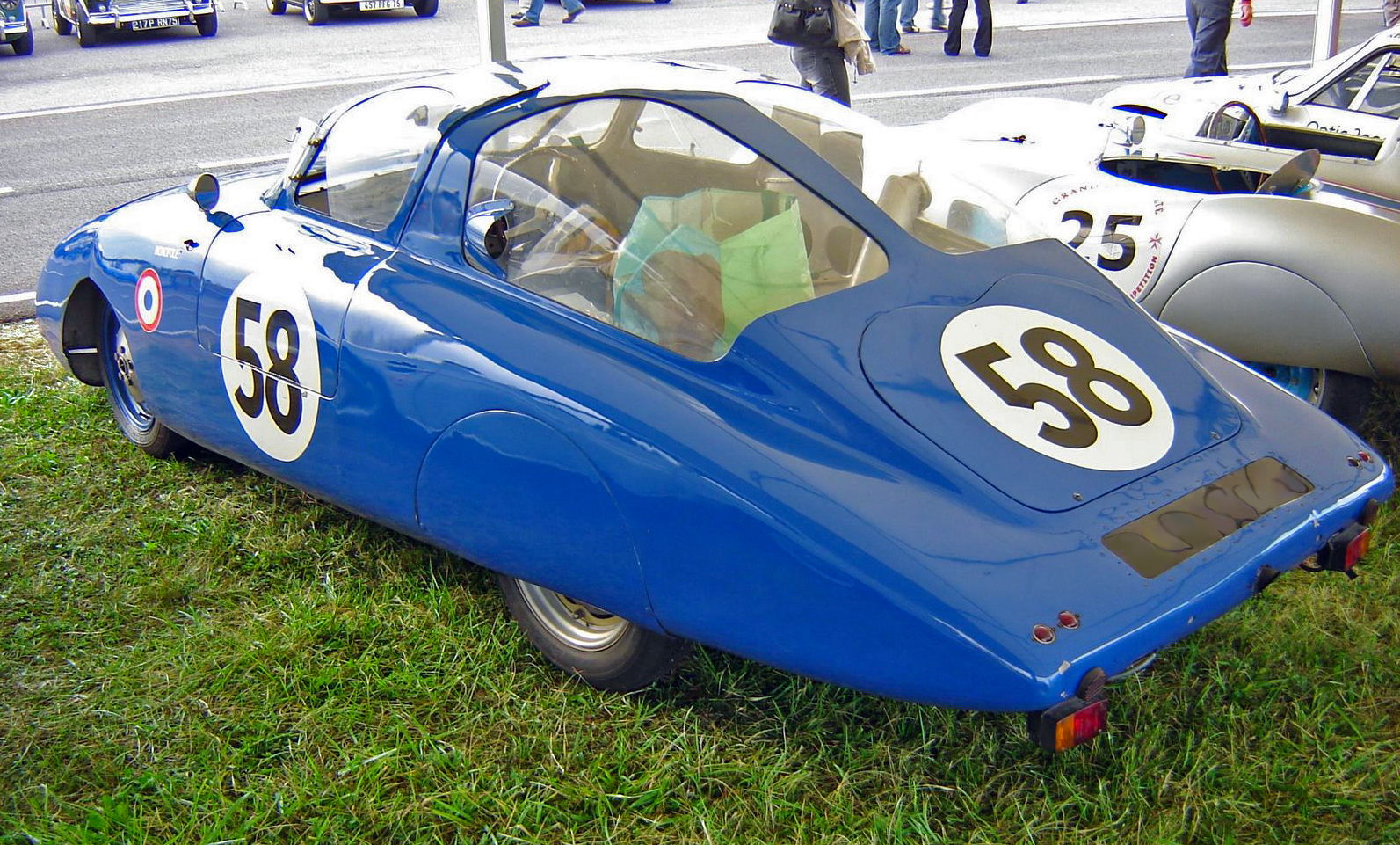
Monopole X86 rear three-quarter view.

While a student at Reims, de Montrémy spent time at Circuit Reims-Gueux, where he developed a taste for racing. As CEO of Monopole, he recognised the value of competition as a way to both test Monopole's products and promote the company. Efforts were focused on the small-displacement classes in endurance racing as conditions closest to what the parts would experience in normal road use. Écurie Monopole was established to take the company racing.

de Montrémy designed the first racing Monopole himself. This car used the chassis and engine of a Simca 8, but clothed them in lightweight aluminium bodywork. Its debut race was at the Formula Libre Voiturette 2.0+1.1s at Reims on 6 July 1947, where the car finished seventh. In 1948 two more Simca-Monopoles were built that used the Simca 8's engine, but these successors substituted custom-built lightweight chassis for the Simca original. These cars were raced throughout 1948 and 1949, including the first appearance of a Monopole at Le Mans, where the car driven by de Montrémy and Eugène Dussous finished twelfth overall and first in the S 1.1 class.

Racing the Monopoles was to some extent a family affair, with de Montrémy and his brothers-in-law Jean and Pierre Hémard making many appearances in the cars, including at the 24 Hours of Le Mans in 1950, 1951, and 1953. Other Monopole racing drivers included brothers Pierre and Robert Chancel, Pierre Flahault, Yvonne Simon, and Jean Vinatier.

In 1950 Panhard increased their involvement in racing, but indirectly, by offering parts and technical support to different racing teams. Monopole availed themselves of this to design a new racing car that used Panhard's air-cooled flat twin engine designed by Louis Delagarde. The car also used the front-wheel drive chassis of the Panhard Dyna X, suitably modified. The car was designed by Monopole's Pierre Bourdereau, who produced a very compact barquette, although due to its full-width ponton-style bodywork the car is often referred to as a tank, as are some other Monopoles. The naming convention for Monopole's Panhard-based racing cars followed that used for the various Dyna X models.

In 1952 Monopole won both the Index of Performance and the eighteenth Biennial Cup for the third year in a row, making them the only manufacturer to achieve three such consecutive victories.

In 1953 Panhard decided to become directly involved in racing. Paul Panhard established a racing team under director Etienne de Valance. With the help of designer Marcel Riffard and later Pierre Durand, Panhard produced three models for their own racing efforts; the X88, X89 and VM5. As there were no corresponding Dyna X series X88 or X89, these designations were specific to the racing cars built by Panhard.

In 1956, following the accident at Le Mans in 1955, Panhard withdrew from direct racing involvement. Écurie Monopole became Panhard's officially supported racing team. Staff as well as Panhard's racing cars were transferred to Écurie Monopole at their location at Achères. Personnel for the team numbered just eight. Some entrant lists record the team as Société Monopole Course rather than Écurie Monopole.

The team increasingly tried to pursue GT events due to the shortage of sportscar events being run. At the end of the 1958 season the decision was made to close Écurie Monopole.

== Racing cars ==
List of Monopole racing models:

Monopole Sport

- The first Monopole racer used both the 1,090 cc (66.5 cu in) inline four-cylinder engine and chassis of a Simca 8, but with lightweight aluminium bodywork. In 1948 two additional copies were built that kept the Simca engine but used a custom chassis designed and built by Monopole. The car debuted at Reims in 1947, and won its class at Le Mans in 1949.

Duval Monopole

- This car, chassis DS 002, began to appear on tracks around 1951. It seems to have been one of the earlier Simca Monopole cars that had been modified by owner/driver Pierre Duval to accept a 2.0 L V8 engine from a Ford Vedette. Ford sold the Vedette model and the Poissy factory where it and the flathead engine powering it were built to Simca in 1954.

Monopole X84

- Beginning with this model, Monopole based their racing cars on the Panhard Dyna X and its series numbers, using the donor's engine, chassis and running gear but with streamlined custom bodywork. The body style was a barquette, but was referred to as a tank. Panhard's X84 series was the basis of the Dyna 100, and came with a GM600 S engine that displaced 610 cc (37.2 cu in) and developed 22 CV (16 kW) at 4000 rpm in standard tune. The Monopole X84 first appeared at Le Mans in 1950, where the number 52 car driven by de Montrémy and Hémard finished twenty-second overall. This model continued to appear at various races, including Le Mans, for several years after.

Monopole X85

- X85 was the series number for the Dyna 110. Engine displacement was the same as in the X84, but the GM600 SS2 engine developed 28 CV (21 kW) at 4,800 rpm in factory tune. A Monopole X85 barquette with number 60 appeared at the 1953 24 Hours of Le Mans driven by Hémard and de Montrémy.

Monopole X86

- When Monopole upgraded to the X86 series from the Dyna 120, engine displacement grew to 745 cc (45.5 cu in) and was available in two levels of tune from the factory; the GM750 SS3 engine which developed 32.6 CV (24.0 kW) at 5000, or the GM750 Sprint engine which developed 33.5 CV (24.6 kW) at 5000 rpm. Monopole X86 cars appeared at Le Mans in 1955, then again in 1957 and 1958. Both barquette and berlinette versions of the X86 were built.

Monopole X87

- The X87 series embodied by the Dyna 130 received an engine of 848 cc (51.7 cu in). Power from the standard GM 850 S engine was 38 CV (27.9 kW) at 5000 rpm, while the Sprint engine produced 42 CV (30.9 kW) at 5000 rpm. The Monopole X87 appeared at Le Mans in 1953.

Panhard-Monopole X88

- Originally built by Panhard and with no Dyna X model sharing its series number, the X88 was a unique design just for racing. The original 1953 Le Mans barquette bodywork by Riffard was wide and low, with a flat tapering tail. Panhard used a chassis of light alloy, and added bodywork of Duralinox. The passenger compartment was faired in except for an opening for the driver, with a raised headrest as part of the bodywork behind his seat. At the front, the leading edges of the fenders projected forward, and were capped by conspicuous forward-facing conical covers. The first X88 was powered by a 610 cc (37.2 cu in) Panhard twin. The body of the X88 would be revised more than once, first to a more traditional sportscar style with exposed headlamps, then to a smooth curving nose with covered lamps.

Panhard-Monopole X89

- As with the X88, the X89 was a racing-specific model first built by Panhard. The original bodywork for the 1953 Le Mans car was similar in appearance to that of the X88 and was also of Duralinox. The X89, however, was powered by the larger 848 cc (51.7 cu in) Panhard twin. Also like the X88, the X89's body would later be revised, with at least one car being bodied as a closed berlinette with a smooth curving nose.

Panhard-Monopole VM5

- In spring 1955 Panhard built two new cars designed by engineer Pierre Durand for the upcoming Le Mans race. Named VM5s, these barquettes were powered by 848 cc (51.7 cu in) flat-twins mounted in tubular chassis with fully independent suspension. The cars had a central seat and bodywork that was streamlined and very low; lower even than the X88 and X89 designed by Riffard. Panhard's VM5s appeared at Le Mans in 1955, as did two X88s newly built by Monopole. One VM5, chassis 868 CA75, was raced at La Sarthe again in 1958 as a Monopole.

Monopole-Oliveira Formula Junior

- In late 1958 Monopole technician and racing mechanic José Carvallo de Oliveira asked de Montrémy for permission to build an open-wheeled Formula Junior car. The new car used the same front-mounted, front-wheel drive flat-twin engine and suspension as the Monopole sportscars. The Monopole-Oliveira was raced in 1959 and 1960, then put into storage. Oliveira died in 2004, and his son sold the car in 2007. The fully restored car appeared at Brands Hatch in June 2008.

== Racing record ==
Reims Formula Libre

- 1947 — Simca Monopole Sport driven by de Montrémy to a seventh-place finish.

12 Hours of Paris

- 1948 — Ninth place finish and class win in S 1.1 by de Montrémy and Dussous. Another car driven by Guerne and Mangenot finished nineteenth.
- 1950 — The team of Liénard and Guerne finished eighth.

24 Hours of Le Mans

- 1949 — Simca Monopole with teammates de Montrémy and Dussous finished twelfth and first in the S 1.1 class.
- 1950 — Simca Monopole with teammates de Montrémy and Hémard finished twenty-second.
- 1951 — Monopole Sport X84 with teammates de Montrémy and Hémard finished twenty-fourth.
- 1952 — Monopole Sport X84 with teammates Hémard and Dussous finished fourteenth and first in the S750 class.
- 1954 — Monopole Sport X84 with teammates Hémard and Pierre Flahault finished thirteenth.
- 1957 — The team of Pierre Hémard and Pierre Chancel finished in eighteenth place in a Panhard Monopole X89. Another team of Robert Chancel and Pierre Flahault brought their Panhard Monopole X88 home in twentieth place.
- 1958 — The only Monopole to finish this year was driven by Jacques Poch and Guy Dunand and came in seventeenth.

Grand Prix

- Portugal Grand Prix — Pierre Duval and the Duval Monopole finished tenth.
- GP de Reims
  - 1952 — Driver Pierre Chancel finished thirteenth in a Monopole Panhard.
- GP des Frontieres
  - 1955 — Pierre Duval and the Duval Monopole V8 finished seventh.
- GP de Rouen
  - 1956 — Pierre Hémard finished eighth overall and first in the S750 class.

12 Hours of Reims

- 1953 — Drivers Yvonne Simon and Hémard finished fourteenth in a Monopole Panhard.
- 1956 — Brothers Pierre and Robert Chancel posted a seventh-place finish in a Panhard Monopole. Another team of van Steen and Sourzat placed twelfth.
- 1957 — Pierre Chancel partnered with Hémard to finish in twenty-fourth place in their Monopole and first in the GT1.0 class, while another car driven by Pierre's brother Robert and Blanchet finished thirty-second in their Monopole.
- 1958 — Three teams finished, with van der Bruwaene/Lejourel coming in first, Hémard/Beaulieux in second, and Vinatier/Masson in third, all in GT750 class.

Coupes du Salon

- 1953 — Thirteenth place finish by driver Hémard in a Monopole Panhard.
- 195 — Jean Vinatier finished in tenth and first in the 750 class.

Coupe de Paris

- 1954 — Driver Dussous finished third in a 750 cc Monopole Panhard.
- 1955 — Pierre Duval finished seventeenth overall and first in the T2.0 class.

Coupe d'Automne

- 1954 — Driver de Montrémy finished twelfth in a Panhard-powered Monopole.

4 Hours of Forez

- 1955 — Robert Chancel finished eighth overall and first in the S1.0 class in a 750 cc Monopole Panhard Tank.

Bol d'Or

- 1955 — Teammates Simon and de Montrémy finished tenth in a Panhard Monopole.

Coupes de Vitesse

- 1957 — Brothers Pierre and Robert Chancel finished twelfth and fourteenth respectively in their Panhard Monopoles.
- 1958 — Pierre Chancel took first place, Vinatier took fifth in the GT1.0+TS event, while Chancel took ninth and first in the S750 class and Vinatier took twelfth in the S2.0 event.

Caen

- 1957 — Pierre Chancel finished in second place, while Pierre Hémard brought his Monopole home in third place.

Tour de France

- 1957 — René Cotton finished twenty-second in his 750 cc Monopole.

3 Hours of Pau

- 1958 — Driver Hémard finished third, while the team of Pierre Chancel and Jean Vinatier finished fourth and driver Pailler brought his car to a fifth-place finish.

Trophée d'Auvergne

- 1958 — Driver Vinatier and his X86 finished seventeenth, and first in the GT750 class, while Roger Masson and his came second in GT750.
