= Gonzague Olivier =

French racing driver

- Nationality: French
- Born: Gonzague Marie Maurice Raphaël Olivier; 27 September 1921 Roubaix, Lille, France
- Died: 30 January 2013 (aged 91) Annappes, Lille, France
- Relatives: Jean-Claude Olivier (son)

24 Hours of Le Mans career
- Years: 1953–1955
- Teams: G. Olivier; Porsche KG
- Best finish: 14th (1954)
- Class wins: 1 (1954)

Gonzague Olivier (27 September 1921 – 30 January 2013), referred to in some sources as Gustave Olivier, was a French racing driver and boat builder. Most of his success came at the wheel of Porsche 356 and Porsche 550 racing cars in the 1950s.

== Racing career ==
In 1952, Olivier drove a Simca 8 Sport to second in class at the Circuit International de Vitesse in Bordeaux, and placed fourth in class in the 12 Hours of Hyères alongside Bernard Dubly.

In 1953, he took part in the Rallye des Routes du Nord for the first time. He finished second overall with Dubly as co-driver. He returned to Hyères, this time sharing a Porsche 356 with Auguste Veuillet. The pair won their class for the first time. Later that year, Olivier made his first appearance at the 24 Hours of Le Mans, sharing his Porsche as a private entrant with co-driver Eugène Martin. They retired with engine issues in the 18th hour. He raced his Porsche in two more sportscar races that year: the Grand Prix Automobile de AC du Nord in his hometown of Roubaix, and the Caen Grand Prix, retiring from both. In October, he served as co-driver to Gilberte Thirion, and the pair won the Tour de Belgique road rally.

Olivier and Thirion continued their partnership to the 1954 Rallye des Routes du Nord, winning the event with Olivier as driver. Across April, he raced three times at Montlhéry: he placed fourth in the S+1.3 race at the Coupes de Vitesse, won the S2.0 race at the Coupes du Printemps, and won his class at the Coupes de Paris. The following month, he entered a production sportscar Grand Prix at Spa-Francorchamps, where he won the S1.6 class in the second race of the day. He reunited with Thirion to win his class in the Bol d'Or at Montlhéry. In June, he raced at Le Mans as part of the official Porsche KG stable, who entered two Porsche 550s to the S1.5 class and one to the S1.1 class. He shared the lower-displacement example with Zora Arkus-Duntov to score yet another class win, helping Porsche sweep the S1.1 and S1.5 classes along with Johnny Claes and Pierre Stasse. June saw him take two further class wins at Picardie and Metz. His last outing of the year saw him place second in class with Veuillet at the 12 Hours of Reims.

1955 began with a return to the Rallye des Routes du Nord, this time sharing a Gordini 1490 with Jacques Ickx; however, the pair retired with an accident. The remainder of the year saw Olivier return to his Porsche 550. He reunited with Veuillet to take overall victory in the prestigious Bol d'Or at Montlhéry, in what would be the final running of the event. The circuit was notoriously demanding on a car, but the pair praised each other's calm and measured approach to such a long and challenging race. Nevertheless, they did not anticipate racing together at Le Mans because Veuillet had been offered a works drive that year. They shared a car one last time at the 12 Hours of Hyères, scoring a second class victory in that event. Olivier entered two 550s to Le Mans that year. He shared one with German driver Josef Jeser, placing second in the S1.1 class, and entered another in partnership with Ecurie Belge, which Wolfgang Seidel and Olivier Gendebien drove to second in S1.5, splitting Porsche KG's works entries. In addition, Olivier drove in three solo events that year: he placed second-in-class in that year's sportscar Grand Prix at Spa, finished fourth at Dieppe, and retired with an accident from the Nürburgring 500 km.

Following this successful period, Olivier began to wind down his racing activities. In 1956, he entered Le Mans with Veuillet in his privateer Porsche 550, but the car ended up being driven by Claude Storez and Helmut Polensky. His only race that year was the 1000 km de Paris at Montlhéry, sharing a Porsche 550 with Robert Dutoit but retiring with an accident. Following this, he drove a Porsche 356 in the Rallye des Routes du Nord in 1958 and 1959.

== Business interests and later life ==
Olivier and his racing co-driver Auguste Veuillet became good friends. Veuillet had founded the Sonauto company in 1947 and it became France's first Porsche importer. Olivier's son Jean-Claude joined the company in 1965 and helped it become the country's first Yamaha motorcycle importer.

During his youth, Olivier had been active in water skiing and won several national awards. Following his motorsport career, he became a designer of boats and outboard motors. His constructions have become highly sought after by vintage boat collectors.

Olivier died on 30 January 2013, just 18 days after his son Jean-Claude had been killed in a road accident.

== Racing record ==
=== Complete 24 Hours of Le Mans results ===
Year	Team	Co-Drivers	Car	Class	Laps	Pos.	Class Pos.
1953	(France) G. Olivier (private entrant)	(France) Eugène Martin	Porsche 356 SL	S 1.1	115	DNF (Engine)	
1954	(West Germany) Porsche KG	(United States) Zora Arkus-Duntov	Porsche 550/4 RS Spyder	S 1.1	216	14th	1st
1955	(France) Gustave Olivier (private entrant)	(West Germany) Josef Jeser	Porsche 550 RS Spyder	S 1.5	234	18th	7th

=== Complete 12 Hours of Reims results ===
Year	Team	Co-Drivers	Car	Class	Laps	Pos.	Class Pos.
1954	Sonauto	(France) Auguste Veuillet	Porsche 550 RS Spyder	S 1.5	193	13th	2nd

=== Complete 12 Hours of Hyères results ===
Year	Team	Co-Drivers	Car	Class	Laps	Pos.	Class Pos.
1952		(France) Bernard Dubly	Simca 8 Sport	S 1.5		8th	4th
1953		(France) Auguste Veuillet	Porsche 356	S 1.5	180	4th	1st
1955		(France) Auguste Veuillet	Porsche 550 RS Spyder	S 1.6	214	5th	1st
