= 1953 24 Hours of Le Mans =

21st 24 Hours of Le Mans endurance race

Previous: 1952	Next: 1954
Index: Races | Winners

The 1953 24 Hours of Le Mans was the 21st Grand Prix of Endurance, and took place on 13 and 14 June 1953, at the Circuit de la Sarthe, Le Mans (France). It was also the third round of the F.I.A. World Sports Car Championship.

British drivers Tony Rolt and Duncan Hamilton won the race with one of three factory-entered Jaguar C-Types, the first cars ever to race at Le Mans with disc brakes.

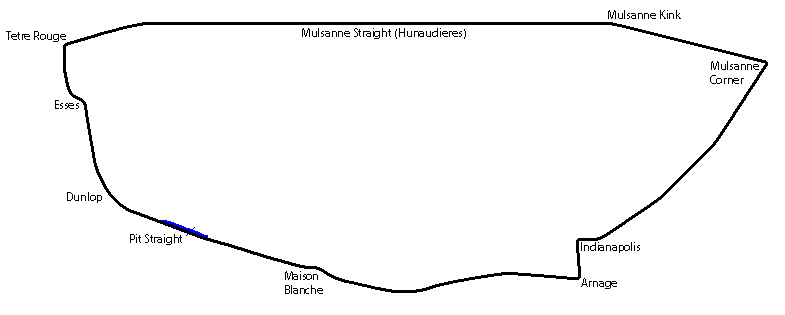
Le Mans in 1953

== Regulations ==
With the ongoing success of the World Championship of Drivers, this year saw the introduction by the FIA of a World Championship for Sports Cars, creating interest from the major sports car manufacturers. It also drew together the endurance races in Europe and North America. The Le Mans race was the third round in the championship after the 12 Hours of Sebring and the Mille Miglia.

After the efforts by drivers in the recent races to drive almost single-handedly (Chinetti in 1949, Rosier and Hall in 1950, Levegh and Cunningham in 1952) and the consequent safety danger through exhaustion, the ACO set limits of maximum driving spells of 80 consecutive laps and 18 hours in total for each driver.

This year also marked the first use of a radar-‘gun’ to measure speeds across a flying kilometre on the Hunaudières Straight. The Cunningham would touch almost 156mph. Some 6 mph faster than last years winning Mercedes gull wing coupe. These results aligned with engine size but, significantly, also the impact of aerodynamics on top speed:

Nation	Manufacturer	Engine	Top Speed
(United States)	Cunningham C-5R	Chrysler 5.45L V8	249.1 km/h
(Italy)	Alfa Romeo 6C/3000CM	Alfa Romeo 3.5L S6	245.9 km/h
(United Kingdom)	Jaguar C-Type	Jaguar 3.45L S6	244.6 km/h
(Italy)	Ferrari 340 MM	Ferrari 4.1L V12	242.1 km/h
(France)	Talbot-Lago T26 GS	Talbot-Lago 4.5L S6	239.1 km/h
(France)	Gordini T26S	Gordini 2.5L S6	233.9 km/h
(United Kingdom)	Allard J2R	Cadillac 5.4L V8	233.8 km/h
(Italy)	Lancia D.20	Lancia 2.7L V6 s/c	219.6 km/h
(United Kingdom)	Aston Martin DB3S	Aston Martin 2.9L S6	212.2 km/h
(Germany)	Porsche 550 Coupé	Porsche 1.5L F4	197.7 km/h
(France)	DB HBR-4 LM	Panhard 0.7L F2	160.6 km/h
(France)	Panhard X88	Panhard 0.6L F2	169.8 km/h

== Entries ==
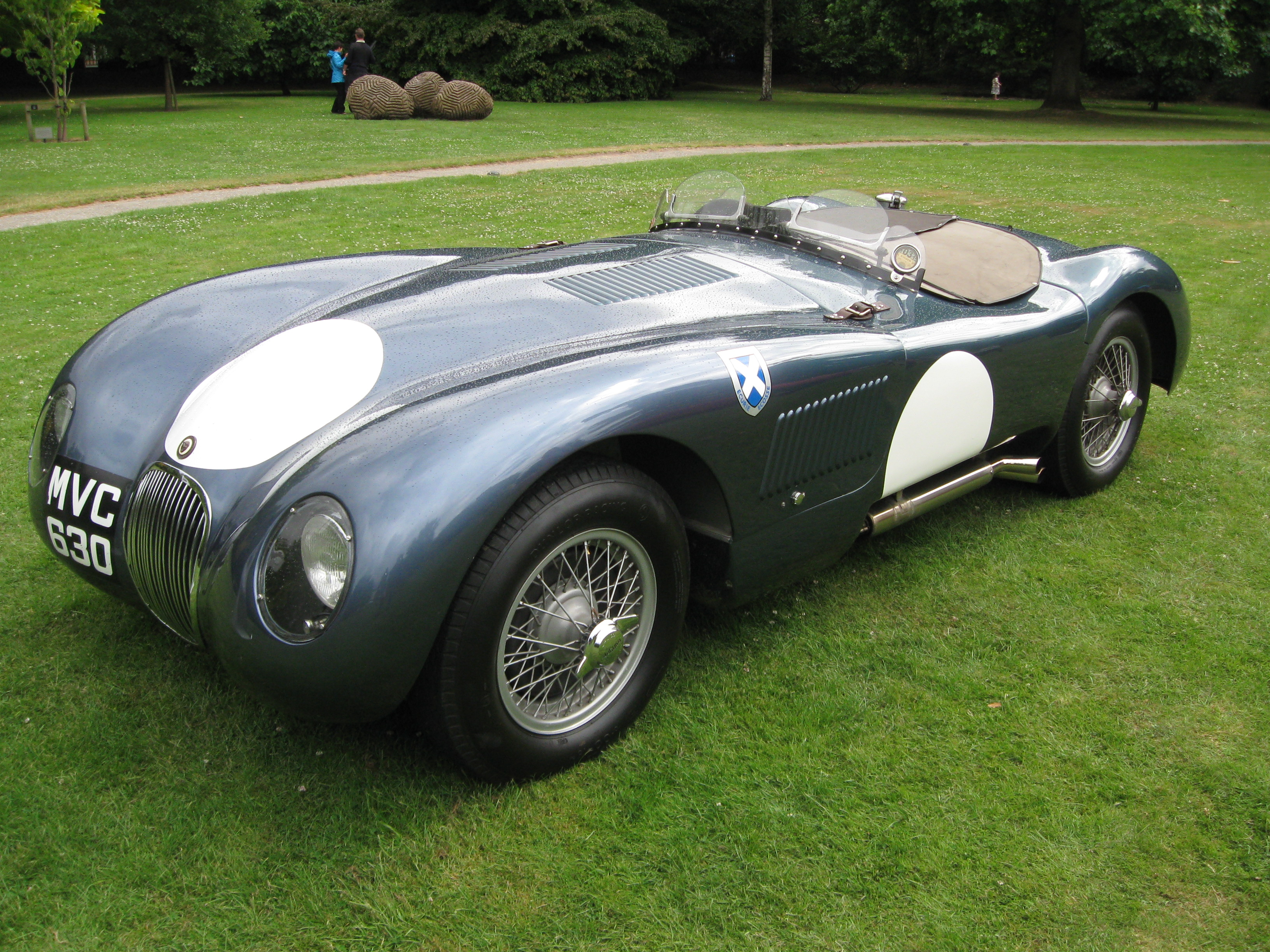
The race was won by a Jaguar C-Type, similar to that pictured above

The prestige of the race, as well as the advent of the new championship, generated interest in Le Mans. Of the 69 entrants and reserves, nineteen different marques (and their subsidiaries) were present. 56 works-entered cars were officially represented, with over half in the main S-8000, S-5000 and S-3000 classes. Mercedes-Benz did not return to defend their title – they were busy preparing new cars for both the F1 and Sports Car championships. So the overall victory was shaping up as a contest between Italy (Scuderia Ferrari, S.P.A. Alfa Romeo and Scuderia Lancia), England (Jaguar supported by Aston Martin, Allard and Nash-Healey/Austin-Healey and the United States (Cunningham), with the French (Talbot and Gordini) being the ‘dark horses’.

Drivers included all three F1 World Champions to date (Alberto Ascari, Juan Manuel Fangio, Giuseppe Farina) and over 30 other current and up-and-coming Grand Prix racers.

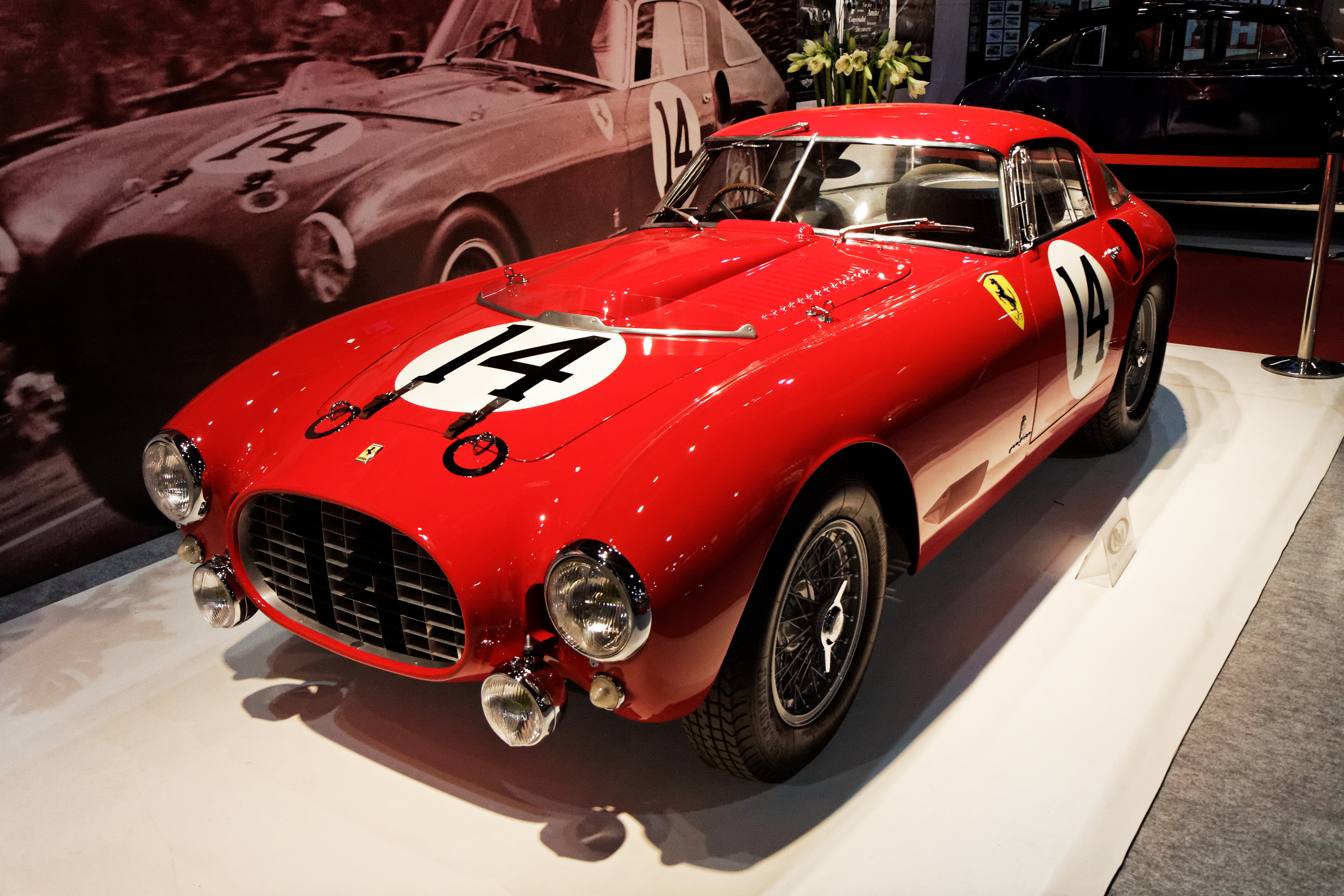
Ferrari 340 MM Berlinetta

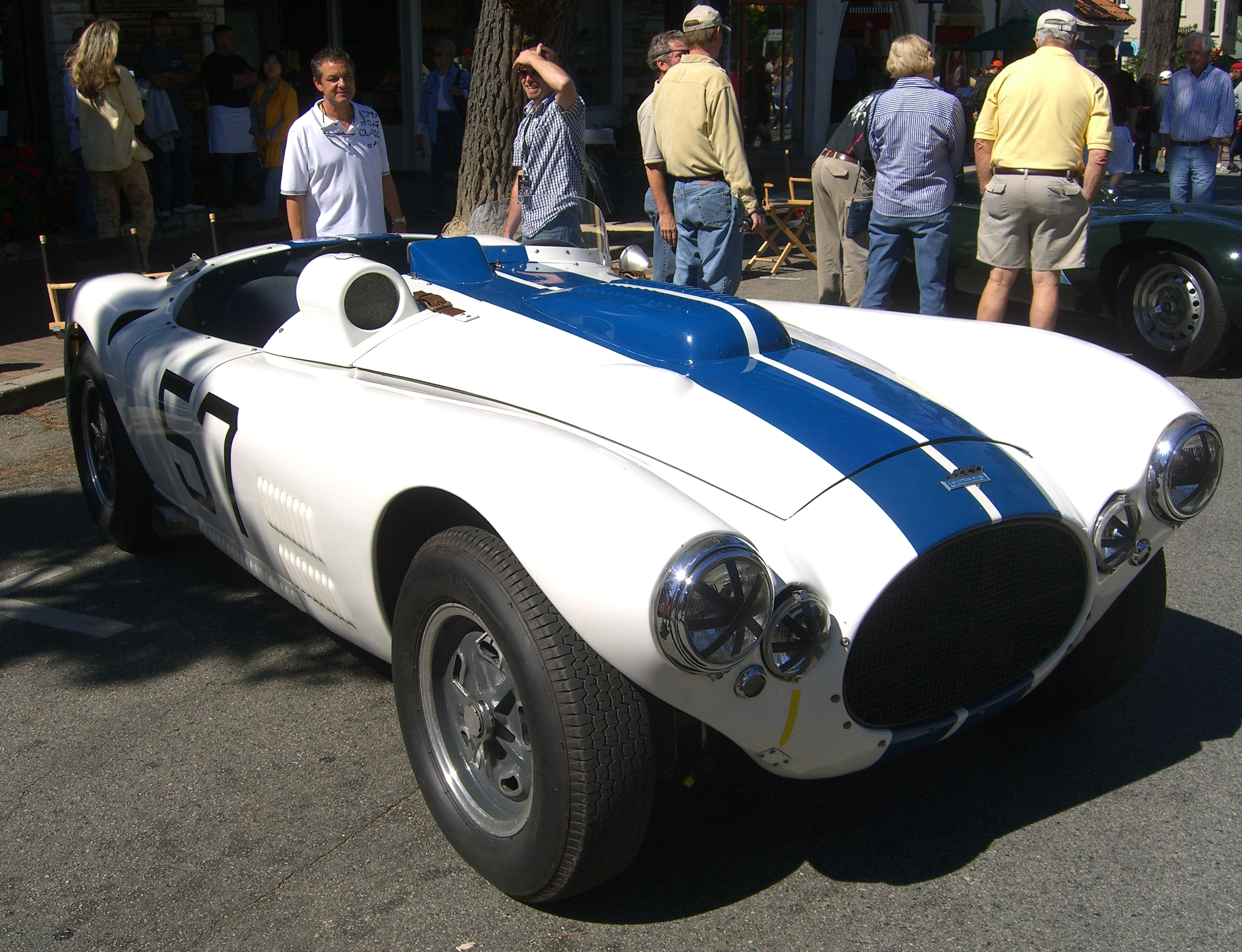
Cunningham C-4R

The Italian teams had built new cars for the season and all had strong driver line-ups. Ferrari entered two lightweight Ferrari 340 MM Berlinettas powered by the company's big 280 bhp 4.1 litre V12 engine built for a challenge at Mille Miglia. Both had Pinin Farina-designed bodies. Ascari and Luigi Villoresi were to share another lightweight coupé 375 MM converted to 4.5-litres, while brothers Paolo and Gianni Marzotto (winner of the 2nd round of the championship: the Mille Miglia) and Giuseppe Farina and debutante Mike Hawthorn were down to drive the 340 MMs. A third 340 MM Spyder was entered by American Ferrari agent Luigi Chinetti for himself, with Anglo-American Tom Cole (who had finished 3rd with Allard in 1950) as his co-driver. Such was the quality of the entry list that six other Ferraris could not make the starting list.

Alfa Romeo was back at Le Mans for the first time since the war and fielded the beautiful new 6C/3000CM (‘’Cortemaggiore’’) powered by a 3.5L S6 engine (developing 270 bhp and 245 km/h) for Fangio and Onofre Marimón and Consalvo Sanesi and Piero Carini. The third car was driven by Mercedes-Benz works-drivers Karl Kling and Fritz Riess who also had their team manager, Alfred Neubauer, in the pits with them. Lancia this year stepped up to the big class with three new D.20 Coupés. Having just won the non-Championship Targa Florio with a 3.0L V6 engine, team manager Vittorio Jano instead decided to install supercharged 2.7L engines. This proved to be a mistake as the small increase in power (to 240 bhp) increased unreliability and gave away over 20 km/h top speed to the rival Jaguars and Ferraris. GP-racers Louis Chiron and Robert Manzon, Piero Taruffi and Umberto Maglioli were in the team, with José Froilán González and endurance-race specialist Clemente Biondetti in the reserve car.

Jaguar returned with their C-Types and after the debacle of the previous year, were determined not to repeat those mistakes, having undertaken a lot of development work. Team manager ‘Lofty’ England employed the same driver pairings as 1952, with Peter Walker and Stirling Moss, Peter Whitehead and Ian Stewart, and Tony Rolt and Duncan Hamilton. The cars reverted to the aerodynamic design prior to that of the 1952 Le Mans cars, whose revised nose and tail had adversely affected stability at speeds over 120 mph. For 1953 the cars were lighter and more powerful (now developing 218 bhp), and they were the first-ever Le Mans cars equipped with disc brakes, from Dunlop, whose greater efficiency gave the C-Types a distinct advantage over their drum-braked competitors. The disc brakes had been available in 1952, but given the problems with the radiators they had been swapped out so the team could concentrate on just one potential issue in the race. The works cars were supported by a standard production-body car entered by the new Belgian Ecurie Francorchamps team.

Aston Martin entered their new DB3S cars for Reg Parnell and Peter Collins, George Abecassis and Roy Salvadori, and Eric Thompson and Dennis Poore. Using the same 3-litre engine as the DB3, it was put into a newly designed, shortened, chassis. However it was suffering from considerable lack of testing, being well down on speed.

Donald Healey this year had two collaborations: his last year with Nash Motors with a pair of long-tailed models, and a new partnership with the Austin Motor Company using its 2.7L engine, producing only 100 bhp but capable of 190 km/h. Bristol also arrived with two cars for Lance Macklin / Graham Whitehead and Jack Fairman / Tommy Wisdom, and managed by former Bentley Boy and Le Mans winner Sammy Davis. The rear-engined 450 coupés were ugly and noisy but the 2 litre engine could get them to nearly 230 km/h. Briggs Cunningham also brought three cars, all with 310 bhp 5.5L Chrysler V8 engines: a new C-5R (nicknamed “Le Requin” (the shark) by the French) for Phil Walters and John Fitch who had won the inaugural championship race at Sebring; a C-4R for Cunningham himself and William "Bill" Spear and, a C-4RK coupé for veteran Charley Moran (the first American to race at Le Mans, back in 1929) and Anglo-American John Gordon Bennett.

This year Talbot entered a full works-team, rather than just providing support to privateer entries. The trio of blue T26 GS cars were driven by Talbot regulars Guy Mairesse (with Georges Grignard), Louis Rosier and Elie Bayol, and Pierre Levegh and Charles Pozzi. Although still very fast, they were starting to show their age to the nimbler cars from Italy and Great Britain. André Chambas also returned with his supercharged modified SS spyder for a 5th and final time. Gordini had intended to debut the new 3.0L T24S, but scratched it because of atrocious handling. Instead an uprated T16 design, the T26S with a 2.5L engine was prepared for Maurice Trintignant and Harry Schell. An older T15S was entered for Behra and Mieres. Though it only had a 2.3L engine it was lighter, and just as quick as its bigger brother.

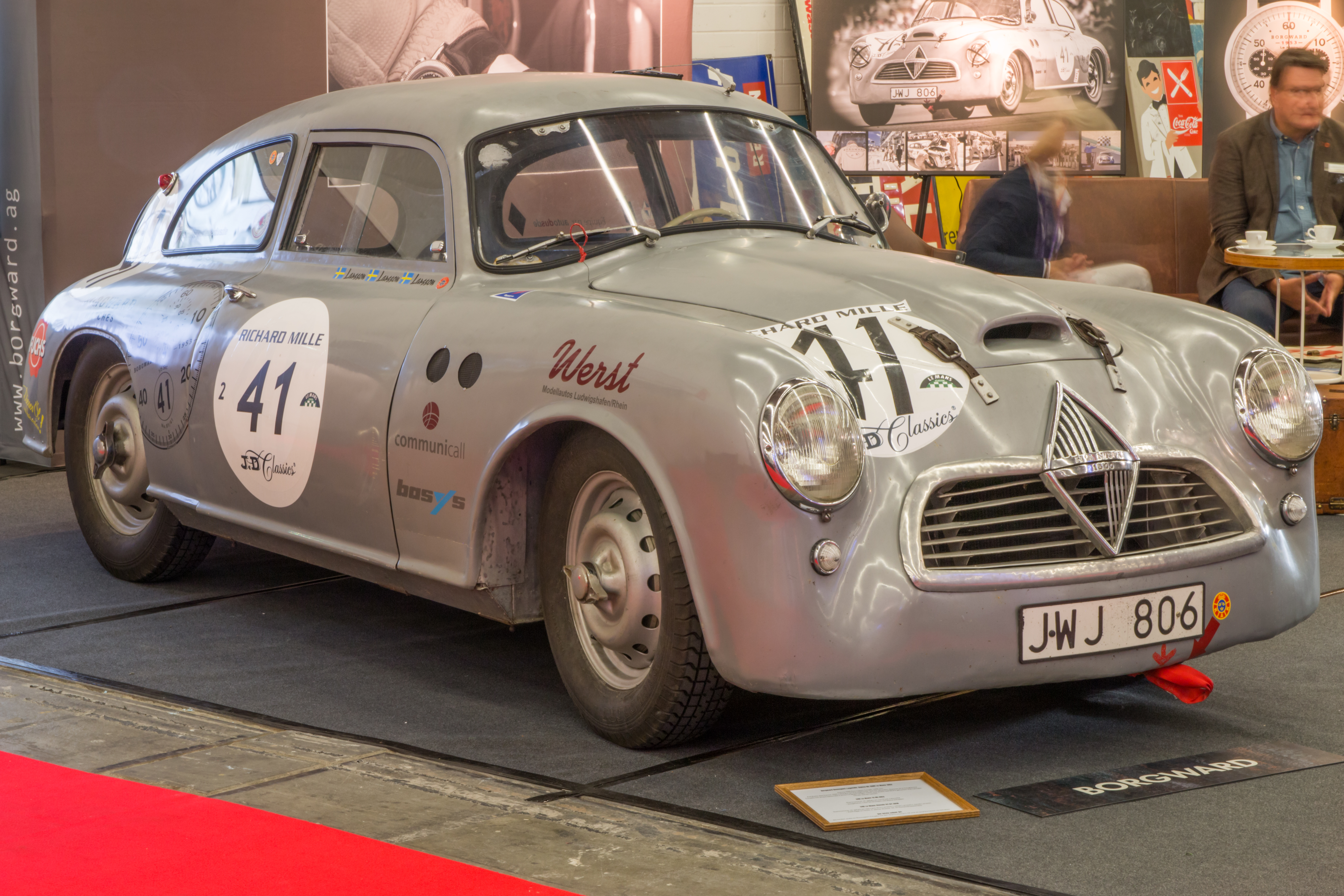
Borgward Hansa RS 1500, driven by Poch and Mouche

Without Mercedes-Benz, German representation fell to works teams from Borgward (here for the first and only time) and Porsche, both in the medium S-1500 class. Porsche stepped up from the S-1100 class with a new, purpose-designed race car, the 550 Coupé and its flat-four 1488cc engine, making only 78 bhp but a top speed of nearly 200 km/h. There were also a pair of the smaller 356 SL in the S-1100 class.

As expected the French dominated the smaller-engined classes. The most eye-catching were the four from Panhard, bringing cars with their own badge this time under a new competition department, albeit under close collaboration with Monopole: with very aerodynamic designs from French aviation engineer Marcel Riffard using both of the Panhard engines. Other works entries came from Renault, DB and Monopole themselves.

== Practice ==
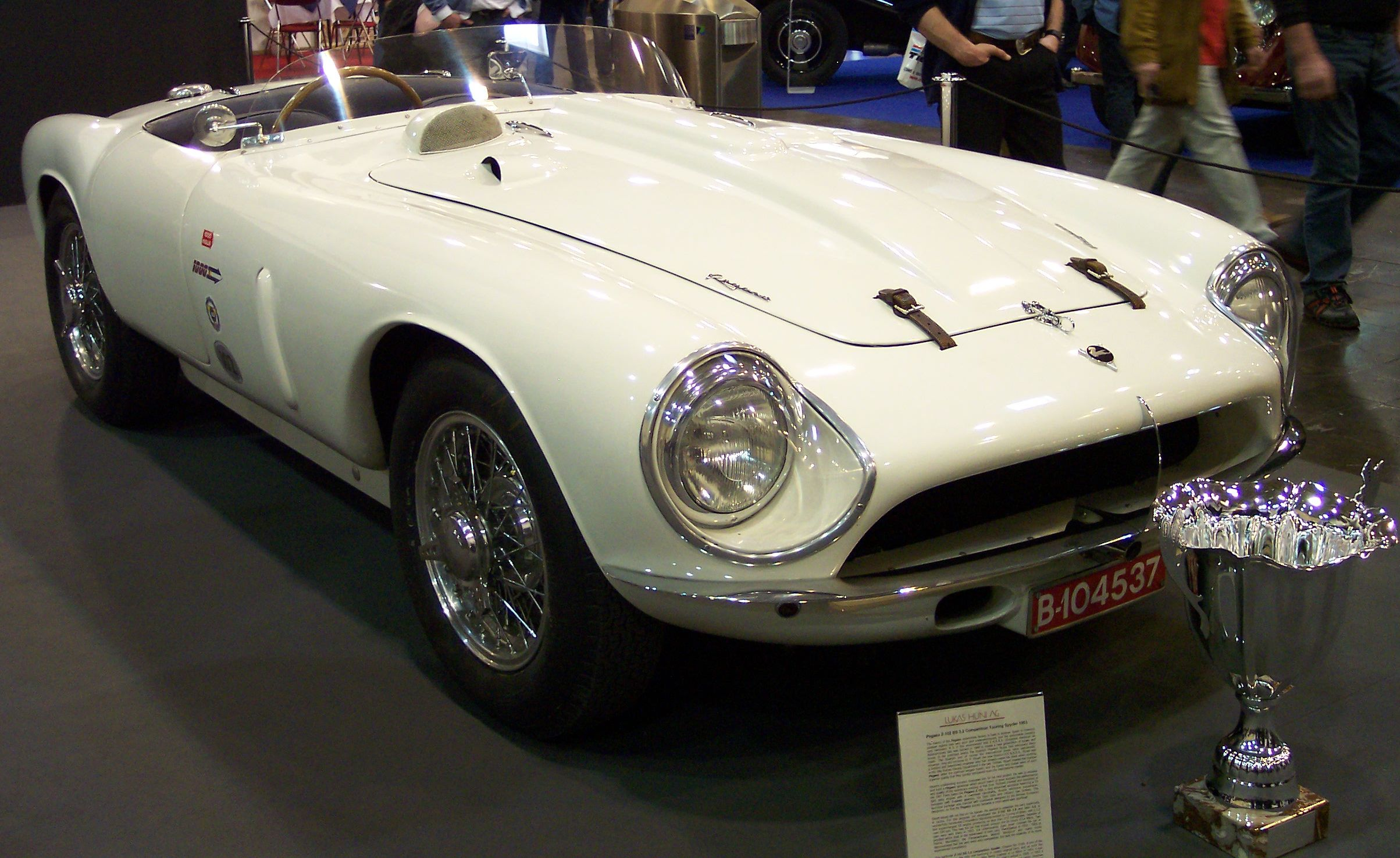
Pegaso Z-102 that crashed

In Thursday practice the Jaguars showed their class with all three works cars going under the lap record, but drama also happened when the 3rd car, of Rolt and Hamilton, was disqualified. It had been on track at the same time as another Jaguar which had the same racing number (the spare car being used as a precaution to qualify Norman Dewis, the Jaguar test driver, as a reserve), and a protest raised by the Ferrari team. Jaguar chairman, Sir William Lyon, agreed to pay the ACO fine, and ‘Lofty’ England successfully pleaded his case to the official that no intention to cheat had been meant and it was an honest mistake and so they were reinstated. But Hamilton's account of the affair has become motor racing legend. Devastated by their disqualification, he and Rolt had gone into the city for the night to drown their sorrows, and when England found them at 10am the next day (race-day) at Gruber's restaurant, they were nursing hangovers and drinking copious amounts of coffee. England later said: "Of course I would never have let them race under the influence. I had enough trouble when they were sober!" Tony Rolt also said the story was fiction.

The Spanish Pegaso team withdrew both their entries after Juan Jover crashed his Z-102 Spyder during practice. Misjudging the speed of his approach to the corner after the Dunlop bridge, he hit the barriers at over 200 km/h and was thrown from the car, seriously injuring his left leg. With no apparent explanation for the crash, the team decided on safety first and scratched the other car. It was the first and last time they got to Le Mans.

== Race ==
=== Start ===
At 4:00pm on the Saturday, the flag fell and the race was on. As usual, Moss was quick out of the blocks and led the cars away, but the Allard passed him on the Mulsanne straight and was leading the closely bunched field at the end of the first lap. But Sydney Allard’s early lead barely lasted, and by lap four he had to retire with a collapsed rear suspension that severed a brake pipe. The first few laps at Le Mans mean little and it was not until after 30 minutes that the true nature of the race became apparent. Rolt had already put in a lap record at 96.48 mph, while Moss led the way, closely followed by Villoresi, Cole, Rolt, Fitch, with Karl Kling rounding out the top six. But Moss was also soon in trouble. Although he had pulled away from the chasing pack, a misfire had set in after only 20 laps, in the second hour. The unscheduled pitstop to change spark plugs, plus another later for the eventual fix – removal of a clogged fuel filter – dropped the car down to 21st. At least Jaguar had remembered the pit regulations: A Ferrari mechanic topped up the brake system on Mike Hawthorn’s 340 MM before the specified 28 laps had been completed, thereby Hawthorn/Farina were disqualified. Whilst all this was going on, Villoresi had taken the lead.

By 5pm, at the end of the first hour, the order had settled down and it became clear that the Jaguars, Ferraris and Alfa Romeos were the teams to be reckoned with. The Lancias and Talbots were quite outclassed, as were the medium-engined Aston Martins. The race continued at a fantastic pace and now it was Jaguar setting it: passing Villoresi, Rolt lifted his lap times by 5 seconds to push his lead. Then Consalvo Sanesi, in his Alfa Romeo 6C, continued to lower the lap record. Just before 6:00pm, Fangio retired with engine troubles in his Alfa Romeo. At the three-hour mark, Rolt/Hamilton led from Ascari/Villoresi, followed by Cole and his co-driver Luigi Chinetti, Sanesi/Carini, and the Germans Kling and Riess. Already these five cars had pull out a two lap advantage over the rest of the field.

=== Night ===
As darkness fell, the Ferrari-Jaguar battle continued unabated, between Ascari/Villoresi and Rolt/Hamilton, with the Alfa Romeos close behind and the overall order swapping around according to pit-strategy. During the early hours of the morning, Rolt and Hamilton continued to lead, while the Ferrari was now losing ground – the big engine starting to stretch the rest of the powertrain.

The Gordinis were once again punching above their weight, mixing it in the top-10 with the third works Jaguar, the other Ferraris and the Cunninghams. The smaller-engined car was a high as 7th ahead of its stable-mate until its rear-axle seized, necessitating long repairs that proved terminal soon after midnight. In the other classes the Porsche 550s had the measure of all the smaller cars and, aside from those superfast Gordinis, were even running ahead of the S2.0 and S3.0 cars.

Just after midnight, Tommy Wisdom's Bristol had an engine fire (almost an identical problem had hit its sister-car earlier in the evening). Crashing, Wisdom was trapped for a short while before being rescued and taken to hospital with minor burns and a dislocated shoulder.

Then just before 3am, the rear suspension on the Sanesi/Carini Alfa Romeo had collapsed, and they were out, along with George Abecassis and Roy Salvadori with oil getting into their Aston Martin's clutch.

Although the Ascari and Villoresi car was still taking the fight to the Jaguars, the car was hindered by a sticking clutch and drinking a lot of water. However, the Italians, in a win-or-bust attempt, were driving flat out at all times, but it had no effect on Rolt and Hamilton. Their Jaguar now had a lap lead over the Ferrari.

=== Morning ===
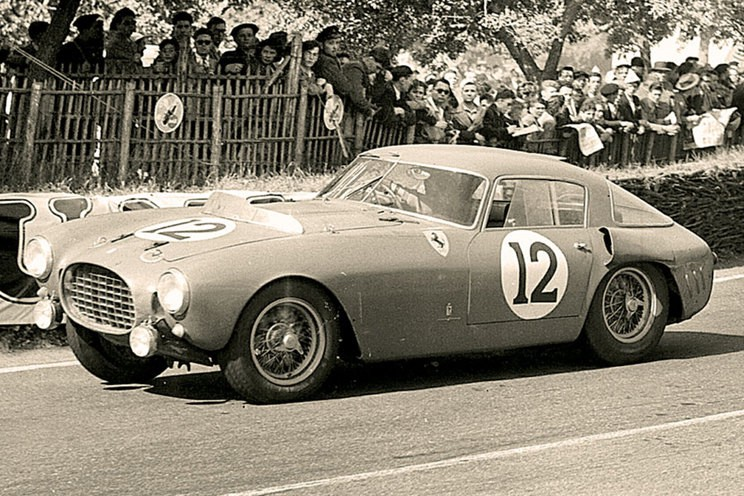
Ferrari 375MM of Ascari/Villoresi during the race, before it retired around 11AM.

Despite the night being clear and fine, dawn approached with a certain amount of mist in the air, making driving conditions very tiring. Just after 6.30am Tom Cole, running 7th, had just overtaken a back-marker when he lost control at the Maison Blanche corners. The Ferrari ploughed into the roadside ditch then rolled and struck a wooden hut nearby. Cole was hurled out of the car in the initial impact and died at the scene.

The windscreen on the leading Jaguar had been smashed early in the race by bird-strike, and as result Rolt and Hamilton were suffering from wind buffering, but the pair kept up the pace nevertheless, with an average speed of well over 105 mph. By the time the mist had cleared, Rolt and Hamilton still led by a lap from the struggling Ferrari. Third place, over three laps adrift, was the Cunningham of Fitch/Walters and a lap further back were the fast Jaguars of Moss/Walker (back in the race after a terrific hard drive back through the field) and Whitehead/Stewart.

Shortly after 8:30am, the leading Jaguar and Ferrari both made routine refuelling stops at the same time. Hamilton had what would now be termed an “unsafe release” when, in the rush to beat the Ferrari, he pulled out right in front of one of the DB-Panhards coming in for its own pitstop. Walters had a big moment when his Cunningham blew a tyre at high speed but he was able to catch it. But with the subsequent pitstop to fix the damage, Moss was able to move up to third. By 9:00am, the clutch issues with the lead Ferrari gave it a long stop, and it was now back in fifth place. This left Rolt and Hamilton clear up front, but they could not rest as Fitch and Walters started to fight back and hound the Moss/Walker Jaguar for second place.

The lame Ferrari retired just before 11am having dropped down the order to sixth place. This left only the Marzotto car to challenge the Jaguars and the lead Cunningham. It could not do it and raced to finish in fifth, keeping the Gordini of Maurice Trintignant and Harry Schell behind them.

The Lancias had never made an impression, none having made it into the top-10 and just after midday the engine of the last one running (of González and Biondetti) gave up.

=== Finish and post-race ===
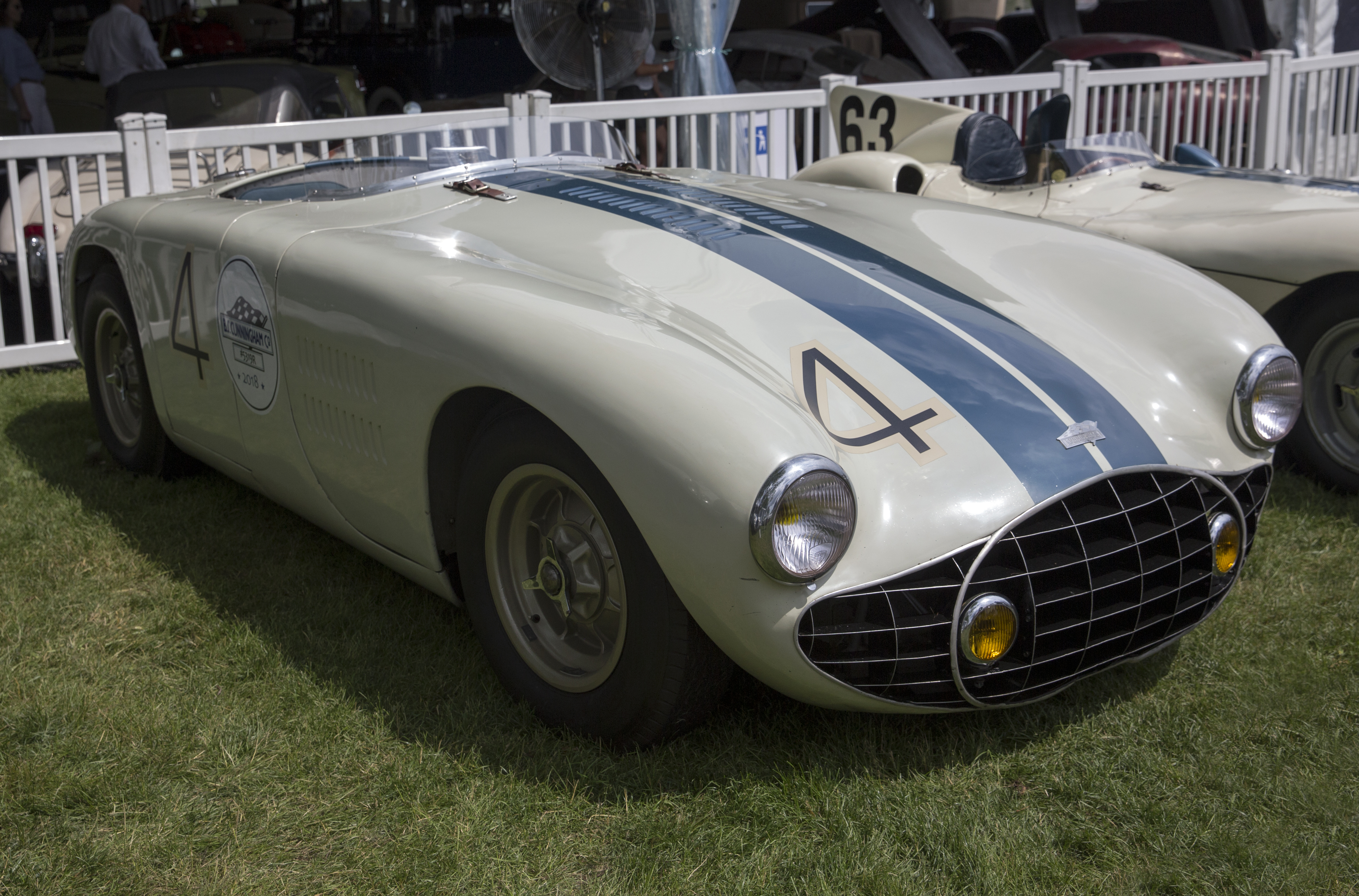
Cunningham C-5R of Walters/Fitch, which finished 3rd overall and won the S 8.0 class.

With three hours to ago, the Jaguars were still lapping at over 105 mph, however the pace had slackened a little. In the closing stages the order did not change, as Hamilton took over from Rolt to complete the last stage of the race. Driving their British license-plated Jaguar C-Type they took the victory, covering a distance of 2,555.04 miles (4,088.064 km), doing 304 laps and averaging a speed of 106.46 mph (170.336 km/h). Moss and Walker were four laps adrift at the finish, in second place with their C-Type after their epic drive. The podium was completed by Walters and Fitch, in their Cunningham C-5R a lap back. The third works Jaguar finished fourth, two laps further behind the Americans, after a very conservative and reliable race.

The Marzotto brothers brought home the sole remaining Ferrari in fifth, finishing with virtually no clutch but having stayed in the top 10 throughout the race. A lap back was the Gordini, having had a trouble-free run. Owner-driver Briggs Cunningham came in 7th followed by the works Talbot of Levegh, finishing this year, and the private Jaguar, entered by Ecurie Francorchamps for Roger Laurent and Charles de Tornaco, in their standard C-Type.

In a race of attrition where only 1 car, if any, of the many other works teams finished, it was an effort of reliability that all cars of the Jaguar, Cunningham and Panhard works teams finished. The Panhard team staged a formation finish, winning the Index of Performance by a narrow margin.

The Porsches finished 1–2 in the S-1500 class with the win going to the car driven by racing journalists Paul Frère and Richard von Frankenberg

The DB-Panhards had a good run, with that of owner-driver René Bonnet winning the S-750 class ahead of its sister car, and finishing 5 laps clear of the OSCA, instead winning the bigger S-1100 class. They were on course for the Index of Performance win, but a bad engine misfire meant it used too much fuel on its very last lap. The streamlined Panhard won the Index by a small margin on a countback.

This was the first time a car completed the race with an average speed over 100 mph (in fact the first six finishers did) and covered over 2500 miles (4000 km). All the categories broke their class records, and a new lap record was set.

Following the race, Alfa Romeo withdrew from motor racing. Jowett was already in receivership and it would also be the last Le Mans for Allard, Lancia and Nash-Healey.

== Official results ==
Results taken from Quentin Spurring's book, officially licensed by the ACO

Pos	Class	No	Team	Drivers	Chassis	Engine	Laps
1	S 5.0	18	(United Kingdom) Jaguar Cars Ltd.	(United Kingdom) Tony Rolt (United Kingdom) Duncan Hamilton	Jaguar C-Type	Jaguar 3.4L S6	304
2	S 5.0	17	(United Kingdom) Jaguar Cars Ltd.	(United Kingdom) Stirling Moss (United Kingdom) Peter Walker	Jaguar C-Type	Jaguar 3.4L S6	300
3	S 8.0	2	(United States) Briggs Cunningham	(United States) Phil Walters (United States) John Fitch	Cunningham C-5R	Chrysler 5.5L V8	299
4	S 5.0	19	(United Kingdom) Jaguar Cars Ltd.	(United Kingdom) Peter Whitehead (United Kingdom) Ian Stewart	Jaguar C-Type	Jaguar 3.4L S6	297
5	S 5.0	15	(Italy) Scuderia Ferrari	(Italy) Paolo Marzotto (Italy) Giannino Marzotto	Ferrari 340 MM Berlinetta	Ferrari 4.1L V12	294
6	S 3.0	35	(France) Automobiles Gordini	(France) Maurice Trintignant (United States) Harry Schell	Gordini T26S	Gordini 2.5L S6	293
7	S 8.0	1	(United States) Briggs Cunningham	(United States) Briggs Cunningham (United States) William "Bill" Spear	Cunningham C-4R	Chrysler 5.5L V8	290
8	S 5.0	7	(France) Automobiles Talbot-Darracq S.A.	(France) Pierre “Levegh” (Pierre Bouillin) (France) Charles Pozzi	Talbot-Lago T26GS Spyder	Talbot-Lago 4.5L S6	276
9	S 5.0	20	(Belgium) Ecurie Francorchamps	(Belgium) Roger Laurent (Belgium) Charles de Tornaco	Jaguar C-Type	Jaguar 3.4L S6	275
10	S 8.0	3	(United States) Briggs Cunningham	(United States) Charles Moran Jr. (United States) John Gordon Bennet	Cunningham C-4RK	Chrysler 5.5L V8	269
11	S 5.0	11	(United Kingdom) Nash-Healey Inc.	(United Kingdom) Leslie Johnson (United Kingdom) Bert Hadley	Nash-Healey 4-litre Sport	Nash 4.1L S6	265
12	S 3.0	34	(United Kingdom) Donald Healey Motor Company	(Netherlands) Maurice Gatsonides (United Kingdom) Johnny Lockett	Austin-Healey 100	Austin 2.7L S4	257
13	S 2.0	39	(United Kingdom) Automobiles Frazer Nash Ltd.	(United Kingdom) Ken Wharton (United Kingdom) Laurence Mitchell	Frazer Nash Le Mans Coupé	Bristol 1971cc S6	253
14	S 3.0	33	(United Kingdom) Donald Healey Motor Company	(France) Marcel Becquart (United Kingdom) Gordon Wilkins	Austin-Healey 100	Austin 2.7L S4	252
15	S 1.5	45	(West Germany) Porsche KG	(West Germany) Richard von Frankenberg (Belgium) Paul Frère	Porsche 550 Coupé	Porsche 1488cc F4	247
16	S 1.5	44	(West Germany) Porsche KG	(West Germany) Helmut 'Helm' Glöckler (West Germany) Hans Herrmann	Porsche 550 Coupé	Porsche 1488cc F4	247
17	S 750	57	(France) Automobiles Deutsch et Bonnet	(France) René Bonnet (France) André Moynet	D.B. HBR-4 LM	Panhard 745cc F2	237
18	S 1.1	48	(Italy) Automobili O.S.C.A.	(Italy) Dr. Mario Damonte (France) ”Heldé” (Pierre-Louis Dreyfus)	OSCA MT-4 1100 Coupé	O.S.C.A. 1093cc S4	232
19	S 750	58	(France) Automobiles Deutsch et Bonnet	(France) Marc Gignoux (France) Marc Azéma	D.B. HBR-4 LM	Panhard 745cc F2	231
20	S 1.1	50	(France) Automobiles Panhard et Levassor	(France) Charles Plantivoux (France) Guy Lapchin	Panhard X89	Panhard 851cc F2	227
21	S 750	61	(France) Automobiles Panhard et Levassor	(France) Pierre Chancel (France) Robert Chancel	Panhard X88	Panhard 611cc F2	223
22	S 1.1	51	(France) Automobiles Panhard et Levassor	(France) Raymond Stempert (France) Georges Schwartz	Panhard X87	Panhard 851cc F2	218
23	S 750	53	(France) R.N.U. Renault	(France) Jean-Louis Rosier (France) Robert Schollmann	Renault 4CV-1068 Spyder	Renault 747cc S4	218
24	S 750	60	(France) Automobiles Panhard et Levassor	(France) Jean Hémard (France) Jean de Montrémy	Monopole X85	Panhard 611cc F2	212
[25]*	S 3.0	66 (Reserve)	(France) A. Constantin (private entrant)	(France) Alexis Constantin (France) Michel Arnaud	Peugeot 203C	Peugeot 1290cc S4; Supercharged	200
26	S 750	56	(France) J.-É. Vernet & J. Pairard	(France) Just-Émile Vernet (France) Jean Pairard	V.P. 166R Coupé	Renault 747cc S4	183

- Note: Not Classified because of Insufficient distance, as car failed to cover 70% of its class-winner's distance.

== Did Not Finish ==
Pos	Class	No	Team	Drivers	Chassis	Engine	Laps	Reason
27	S 5.0	12	(Italy) Scuderia Ferrari	(Italy) Alberto Ascari (Italy) Luigi Villoresi	Ferrari 375 MM Berlinetta	Ferrari 4.5L V12	229	Clutch (20hr)
28	S 1.5	41	(West Germany) Borgward GmbH	(France) Jacques Poch (France) Edmond Mouche	Borgward-Hansa 1500 ‘Rennsport’	Borgward 1498cc S4	228	Overheating (24hr)
29	S 8.0	63 (Reserve)	(Italy) Scuderia Lancia	(Argentina) José Froilán González (Italy) Clemente Biondetti	Lancia D20	Lancia 2.7L V6; Supercharged	213	Engine (21hr)
30	S 3.0	27	(United Kingdom) Aston Martin Ltd.	(United Kingdom) Eric Thompson (United Kingdom) Dennis Poore	Aston Martin DB3S	Aston Martin 2.9L I6	182	Engine (18hr)
31	S 5.0	16	(United States) Luigi Chinetti	(United States) Luigi Chinetti (United States) Tom Cole Jr.	Ferrari 340 MM Vignale Spyder	Ferrari 4.1L V12	175	Fatal accident (16hr)
32	S 8.0	31	(Italy) Scuderia Lancia	(France) Robert Manzon (Monaco) Louis Chiron	Lancia D20	Lancia 2.7L V6; Supercharged	174	Engine (18hr)
33	S 1.1	49	(West Germany) Porsche KG	(France) Auguste Veuillet (Germany) Petermax Müller	Porsche 356 SL	Porsche 1091cc F4	147	Engine (18hr)
34	S 2.0	40	(United Kingdom) Automobiles Frazer Nash Ltd.	(United Kingdom) Bob Gerard (United Kingdom) David Clark	Frazer Nash Le Mans MkII Replica	Bristol 1971cc S6	135	Overheating (14hr)
35	S 5.0	23	(Italy) SpA Alfa Romeo	(West Germany) Karl Kling (West Germany) Fritz Riess	Alfa Romeo 6C 3000 CM	Alfa Romeo 3.5L S6	133	Transmission (12hr)
36	S 5.0	21	(Italy) SpA Alfa Romeo	(Italy) Consalvo Sanesi (Italy) Piero Carini	Alfa Romeo 6C 3000 CM	Alfa Romeo 3.5L S6	125	Rear Suspension (12hr)
37	S 5.0	9	(France) Automobiles Talbot-Darracq S.A.	(France) Guy Mairesse (France) Georges Grignard	Talbot-Lago T26 GS Spyder	Talbot-Lago 4.5L S6	120	Engine (12hr)
38	S 8.0	30	(Italy) Scuderia Lancia	(Italy) Piero Taruffi (Italy) Umberto Maglioli	Lancia D20	Lancia 2.7L V6; Supercharged	117	Electrics (12hr)
39	S 1.1	46	(France) G. Olivier (private entrant)	(France) Gonzague Olivier (France) Eugène Martin	Porsche 356 SL	Porsche 1091cc F4	115	Engine (18hr)
40	S 750	55	(France) J. Lecat (private entrant)	(France) Jacques Lecat (France) Henri Senfftleben	Renault 4CV-1063	Renault 747cc S4	84	Engine (12hr)
41	S 3.0	36	(France) Automobiles Gordini	(France) Jean Behra (Argentina) Roberto Mieres	Gordini T15S	Gordini 2.3L S6	84	Transmission (10hr)
42	S 1.5	47	(United States) Rees T. Makins	(United States) Phil Hill (United States) Fred Wacker Jr.	O.S.C.A. MT-4	O.S.C.A. 1343cc S4	80	Transmission (10hr)
43	S 3.0	26	(United Kingdom) Aston Martin Ltd.	(United Kingdom) George Abecassis (United Kingdom) Roy Salvadori	Aston Martin DB3S	Aston Martin 2.9L S6	74	Clutch (10hr)
44	S 2.0	38	(United Kingdom) Bristol Aeroplane Company	(United Kingdom) Jack Fairman (United Kingdom) Tommy Wisdom	Bristol 450 Coupé	Bristol 1979cc S6	70	Accident / Fire (10hr)
45	S 8.0	32	(Italy) Scuderia Lancia	(Italy) Felice Bonetto (Italy) Luigi "Gino" Valenzano	Lancia D20	Lancia 2.7L V6; Supercharged	66	Transmission (6hr)
46	S 8.0	5	(United Kingdom) Allard Motor Company	(United States) Zora Arkus-Duntov (United States) Ray Merrick	Allard J2R	Cadillac 5.4L V8	65	Engine (10hr)
47	S 1.5	67 (Reserve)	(France) Capt. M. Crespin (private entrant)	(France) André Guelfi (France) Roger Loyer	Gordini T15S	Gordini 1490cc S4	40	Transmission (10hr)
48	S 5.0	8	(France) Automobiles Talbot-Darracq S.A.	(France) Élie Bayol (France) Louis Rosier	Talbot-Lago T26 GS Spyder	Talbot-Lago 4.5L S6	37	Transmission (4hr)
49	S 750	54	(France) R.N.U. Renault	(France) Jean Redélé (France) Louis Pons	D.B. 4CV-1066	Renault 747L S4	35	Engine (4hr)
50	S 2.0	37	(United Kingdom) Bristol Aeroplane Company	(United Kingdom) Lance Macklin (United Kingdom) Graham Whitehead	Bristol 450 Coupé	Bristol 1979cc S6	29	Fire (10hr)
51	S 1.5	42	(West Germany) Borgward GmbH	(West Germany) Hans-Hugo Hartmann (West Germany) Adolf Brudes	Borgward-Hansa 1500 ‘Rennsport’	Borgward 1498cc S4	29	Out of fuel (4hr)
52	S +8.0	6	(France) A. Chambas (private entrant)	(France) André Chambas (France) Charles de Cortanze	Talbot-Lago SS Spyder	Talbot-Lago 4.5L S6; Supercharged	24	Accident (4hr)
53	S 5.0	22	(Italy) SpA Alfa Romeo	(Argentina) Juan Manuel Fangio (Argentina) Onofre Marimón	Alfa Romeo 6C 3000 CM	Alfa Romeo 3.5L S6	22	Engine (3hr)
54	S 3.0	25	(United Kingdom) Aston Martin Ltd.	(United Kingdom) Reg Parnell (United Kingdom) Peter Collins	Aston Martin DB3S	Aston Martin 2.9L S6	16	Accident (2hr)
55	S 750	52	(France) R.N.U. Renault	(France) André Briat (France) Yves Lesur	V.P. 4CV-1064	Renault 747cc S4	14	Engine (7hr)
56	S 5.0	14	(Italy) Scuderia Ferrari	(Italy) Giuseppe Farina (United Kingdom) Mike Hawthorn	Ferrari 340 MM	Ferrari 4.1L V12	12	Disqualified (1hr)
57	S 5.0	10	(United Kingdom) Nash-Healey Inc.	(France) Yves Giraud-Cabantous (France) Pierre Veyron	Nash-Healey Sports	Nash 4.1L S6	9	Engine (2hr)
58	S 750	59	(France) Établissements Monopole	(France) Eugène Dussous (France) Pierre Flahaut	Monopole X84	Panhard 612cc F2	9	Engine (7hr)
59	S 2.0	62	(France) Etablissements Fiat Dagrada	(France) Norbert Jean Mahé (Italy) ComteGiovanni 'Johnny' Lurani	Fiat 8V	Fiat 1996cc V8	8	Electrics (1hr)
60	S 8.0	4	(United Kingdom) Allard Motor Company	(United Kingdom) Sydney Allard (United Kingdom) Philip Fotheringham-Parker	Allard J2R	Cadillac 5.4L V8	4	Transmission (1hr)
DNS	S 1.5	43	(West Germany) Borgward GmbH	(West Germany) Karl-Heinz Schaufele (West Germany) Adolf Brudes	Borgward-Hansa 1500 ‘Rennsport’	Borgward 1498cc S4	0	withdrawn
DNS	S 3.0	28	(Spain) Empresa Nacional de Autocamiones S.A.	(Spain) Juan Jover (West Germany) Paul Metternich	Pegaso Z-102 Spyder	Pegaso 2.8L V8; Supercharged	0	accident
DNS	S 3.0	29	(Spain) Empresa Nacional de Autocamiones S.A.	(Spain) Joaquin Palacio Pover (Spain) Pablo Julio Reh Cardrona	Pegaso Z-102 Spyder	Pegaso 2.8L V8; Supercharged	0	withdrawn

== Index of Performance ==
Pos	Class	No	Team	Drivers	Chassis	Score
1	S 750	61	(France) Automobiles Panhard et Levassor	(France) Pierre Chancel (France) Robert Chancel	Panhard X88	1.319
2	S 750	57	(France) Automobiles Deutsch et Bonnet	(France) René Bonnet (France) André Moynet	D.B. HBR-4 LM	1.317
3	S 5.0	18	(United Kingdom) Jaguar Cars Ltd.	(United Kingdom) Tony Rolt (United Kingdom) Duncan Hamilton	Jaguar C-Type	1.307
4	S 3.0	35	(France) Automobiles Gordini	(France) Maurice Trintignant (United States) Harry Schell	Gordini T26S	1.301
5	S 5.0	17	(United Kingdom) Jaguar Cars Ltd.	(United Kingdom) Stirling Moss (United Kingdom) Peter Walker	Jaguar C-Type	1.292
6	S 750	58	(France) Automobiles Deutsch et Bonnet	(France) Marc Gignoux (France) Marc Azéma	D.B. HBR-4 LM	1.283
7	S 5.0	19	(United Kingdom) Jaguar Cars Ltd.	(United Kingdom) Peter Whitehead (United Kingdom) Ian Stewart	Jaguar C-Type	1.279
8	S 8.0	2	(United States) Briggs Cunningham	(United States) Phil Walters (United States) John Fitch	Cunningham C-5R	1.271
9	S 5.0	15	(Italy) Scuderia Ferrari	(Italy) Paolo Marzotto (Italy) Giannino Marzotto	Ferrari 340 MM Berlinetta	1.251
10	S 750	60	(France) Automobiles Panhard et Levassor	(France) Jean Hémard (France) Jean de Montrémy	Monopole X85	1.250

- Note: Only the top ten positions are included in this set of standings. A score of 1.00 means meeting the minimum distance for the car, and a higher score is exceeding the nominal target distance.

== 19th Rudge-Whitworth Biennial Cup (1952/1953) ==
Pos	Class	No	Team	Drivers	Chassis	Score
1	S 750	61	(France) Automobiles Panhard et Levassor	(France) Pierre Chancel (France) Robert Chancel	Panhard X88	1.319
2	S 8.0	1	(United States) Briggs Cunningham	(United States) Briggs Cunningham (United States) William "Bill" Spear	Cunningham C-4R	1.233
3	S 750	53	(France) R.N.U. Renault	(France) Jean-Louis Rosier (France) Robert Schollmann	Renault 4CV-1068 Spyder	1.211
4	S 5.0	11	(United Kingdom) Nash-Healey Inc.	(United Kingdom) Leslie Johnson (United Kingdom) Bert Hadley	Nash-Healey 4-litre Sport	?

== Statistics ==
Taken from Quentin Spurring's book, officially licensed by the ACO

- Fastest Lap in practice – Hamilton / Whitehead, #18 Jaguar C-Type – 4m 37.0s; 175.27 kp/h (108.91 mph)
- Fastest Lap – Alberto Ascari, #12 Ferrari 375 MM – 4m 27.4s; 181.64 kp/h (112.87 mph)
- Fastest Car in Speedtrap – #2 Cunningham C-4R – 249.14 kp/h (154.81 mph)
- Distance – 4088.06 km (2540.32 miles)
- Winner's Average Speed – 170.34 km/h (108.85 mph)
- Attendance – est. 200 000 (start)

== World Championship Standings after the race ==
Pos	Championship	Points
1=	(United Kingdom) Jaguar	12
1=	(United States) Cunningham	12
3	(Italy) Ferrari	11
4	(United Kingdom) Aston Martin	8
5	(Italy) Alfa Romeo	6
6	(Italy) Lancia	4
7	(Italy) O.S.C.A.	4
8=	(Italy) Maserati	1
8=	(France) Gordini	1

Championship points were awarded for the first six places in each race in the order of 8-6-4-3-2-1. Manufacturers were only awarded points for their highest finishing car, with no points awarded for positions filled by additional cars.

Citations

World Sportscar Championship
Previous race: Mille Miglia	1953 season	Next race: Spa 24 Hours
