= Edmond Mouche =

French racing driver

- Born: Edmond Victor Mouche; 4 September 1899; Étival-lès-le-Mans, Sarthe, France
- Died: 12 May 1989 (aged 89); Paris, Île-de-France, France

24 Hours of Le Mans career
- Years: 1949 – 1954
- Teams: A. Veuillet; J. Poch; Porsche KG; Borgward GmbH; A. Constantin
- Best finish: 11th (1952)
- Class wins: 2 (1951, 1952)

Edmond Mouche (4 September 1899 – 12 May 1989) was a French racing driver. He drove Porsche's first Le Mans entry and took their first two class wins along with Auguste Veuillet.

== Career ==
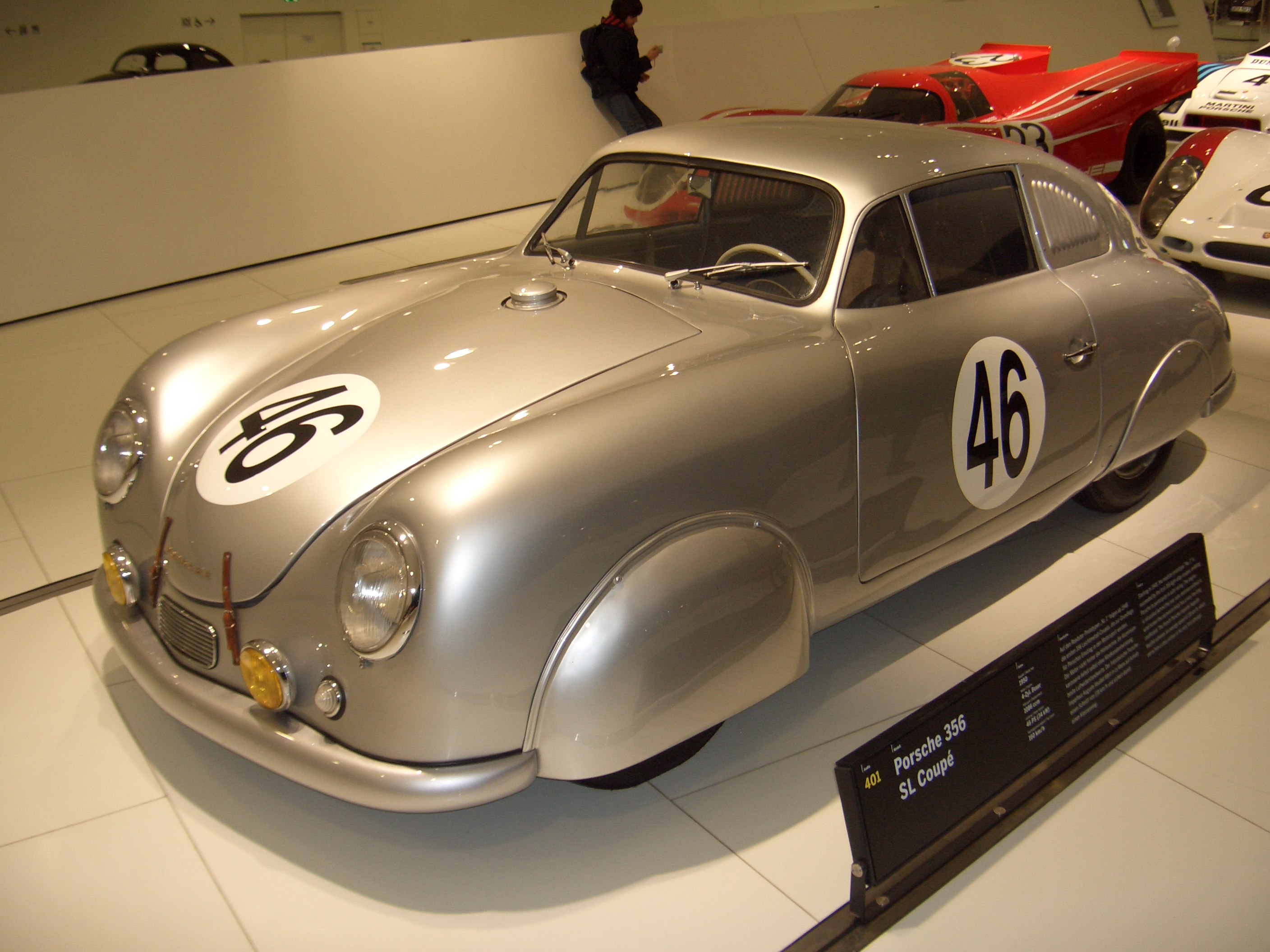
The Porsche 356/4 SL Coupé driven to class victory in the 1951 24 Hours of Le Mans by Mouche and Auguste Veuillet on the brand's first attempt.

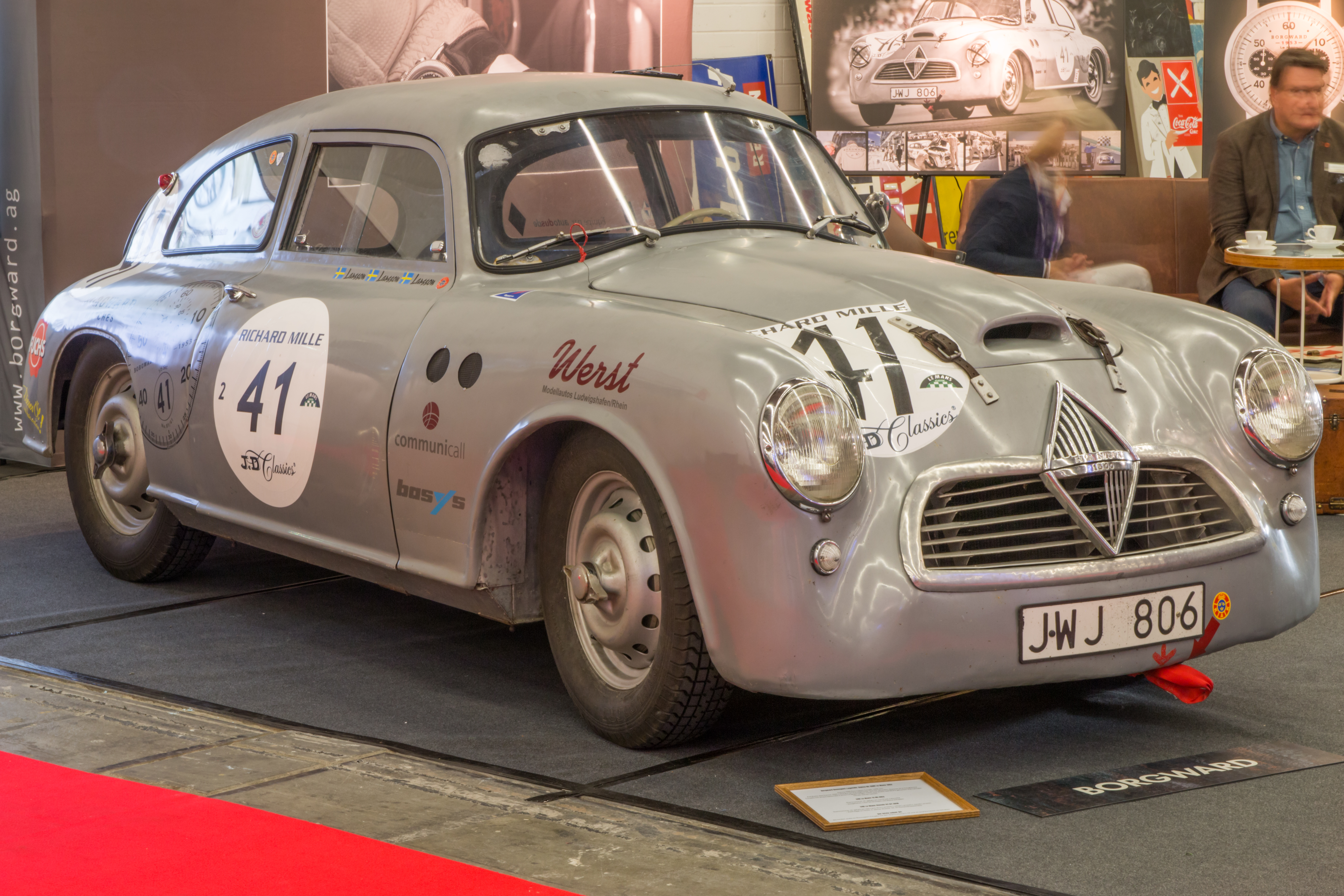
The Borgward-Hansa RS 1500 driven by Mouche and Jacques Poch in the 1953 24 Hours of Le Mans.

Mouche competed in the 1930 Grand Prix de Picardie driving an 1100cc Morano, but did not finish. He entered the 1931 Grand Prix de la Marne at Reims in a Bugatti Type 37A voiturette, but did not appear.

Mouche took part in several races throughout 1947 in his privateer Talbot-Lago T150C. He partnered with José Scaron to finish 8th in Marseille, 10th in Nîmes, and 5th in the 1947 Reims Grand Prix. Following this, Mouche retired from the Grand Prix d'Albi, finished 9th in the Grand Prix d'Alsace in Strasbourg, and finished 8th in the Grand Prix du Comminges. He entered Franco Comotti to the 1947 French Grand Prix in this car, who went on to finish sixth.

In 1948, Mouche won his class at the 24 Hours of Spa with Guy Mairesse. He entered the 12 Hours of Paris at Montlhéry but never started the race.

Mouche began 1949 by finishing second in the Monte Carlo Rally with Maurice Worms. Mouche entered Le Mans with his great friend Auguste Veuillet, driving Veuillet's Delage. The pair ran in third position for most of the race, only to retire with an engine fire in the closing hours. He scored another class victory at the 24 Hours of Spa driving Henri Louveau's Delage.

In 1950, Mouche competed in the inaugural Rallye Automobile Sablé-Solesmes, driving a Delahaye. He raced an Aero Minor twice with Jacques Poch. They entered Le Mans but retired, then went on to finish second in class at the 12 Hours of Paris. He finished sixth at Rouen in a Delahaye with Jean Blanc.

Mouche returned to Sablé-Solesmes in 1951, this time driving a Jaguar. Veuillet, who owned the company Sonauto, had met Ferdinand Porsche at the 1950 Paris Motor Show and convinced the marque to enter two cars for the 1951 24 Hours of Le Mans. Veuillet and Mouche partnered to drive the #46 Porsche 356 SL Coupe under Porsche KG's official works banner and went on to win the S1.1 class, giving Porsche its first class victory on its Le Mans debut. Mouche drove a Hotchkiss Anjou in the newly revived Tour de France later that year, but retired with an accident.

He competed at Sablé-Solesmes in a Simca Aronde in 1952. That year, Mouche and Veuillet returned to Le Mans and repeated their class victory with Porsche. Mouche went on to race a Porsche at Reims but his finishing position is unknown, and at Roubaix where he did not finish.

In 1953, Borgward made their only entry to Le Mans. The factory team entered three cars, with Mouche and Poch reuniting to drive the #41 entry. The pair outlasted Borgward's other two cars but retired in the final hour with overheating. Earlier in the year, Mouche had entered a Borgward to Sablé-Solesmes.

Mouche made his final Le Mans start in 1954, driving the Constantin 203 Barquette with its builder Alexis Constantin. They retired in the early hours of the morning with transmission issues.

== Racing record ==
=== Complete 24 Hours of Le Mans results ===
Year	Team	Co-Drivers	Car	Class	Laps	Pos.	Class Pos.
1949	(France) Auguste Veuillet (private entrant)	(France) Auguste Veuillet	Delage D6-3L	S 3.0	208	DNF (Engine / fire)	
1950	(France) J. Poch (private entrant)	(France) Jacques Poch	Aero Minor	S 750	139	DNF (Wheel bearing)	
1951	(Germany) Porsche K.G.	(France) Auguste Veuillet	Porsche 356 SL Coupe	S 1.1	210	19th	1st
1952	(Germany) Porsche KG	(France) Auguste Veuillet	Porsche 356 SL	S 1.1	220	11th	1st
1953	(West Germany) Borgward GmbH	(France) Jacques Poch	Borgward-Hansa 1500 ‘Rennsport’	S 1.5	228	DNF (Overheating)	
1954	(France) A. Constantin (private entrant)	(France) Alexis Constantin	Constantin-Peugeot 203C Spyder	S 2.0	95	DNF (Transmission)	

=== Complete 24 Hours of Spa results ===
Year	Team	Co-Drivers	Car	Class	Laps	Pos.	Class Pos.
1948		(France) Guy Mairesse	Delahaye 135CS	S 4.0	187	4th	1st
1949		(France) Henri Louveau	Delage D6-3L	S 4.0	?	2nd	1st

=== Complete Rallye de Monte Carlo results ===
Year	Team	Co-Drivers	Car	Pos.
1949		(France) Maurice Worms	Hotchkiss 686 GS Sedan	2nd
