= Ford Zephyr =

British car produced by Ford, 1950–1972

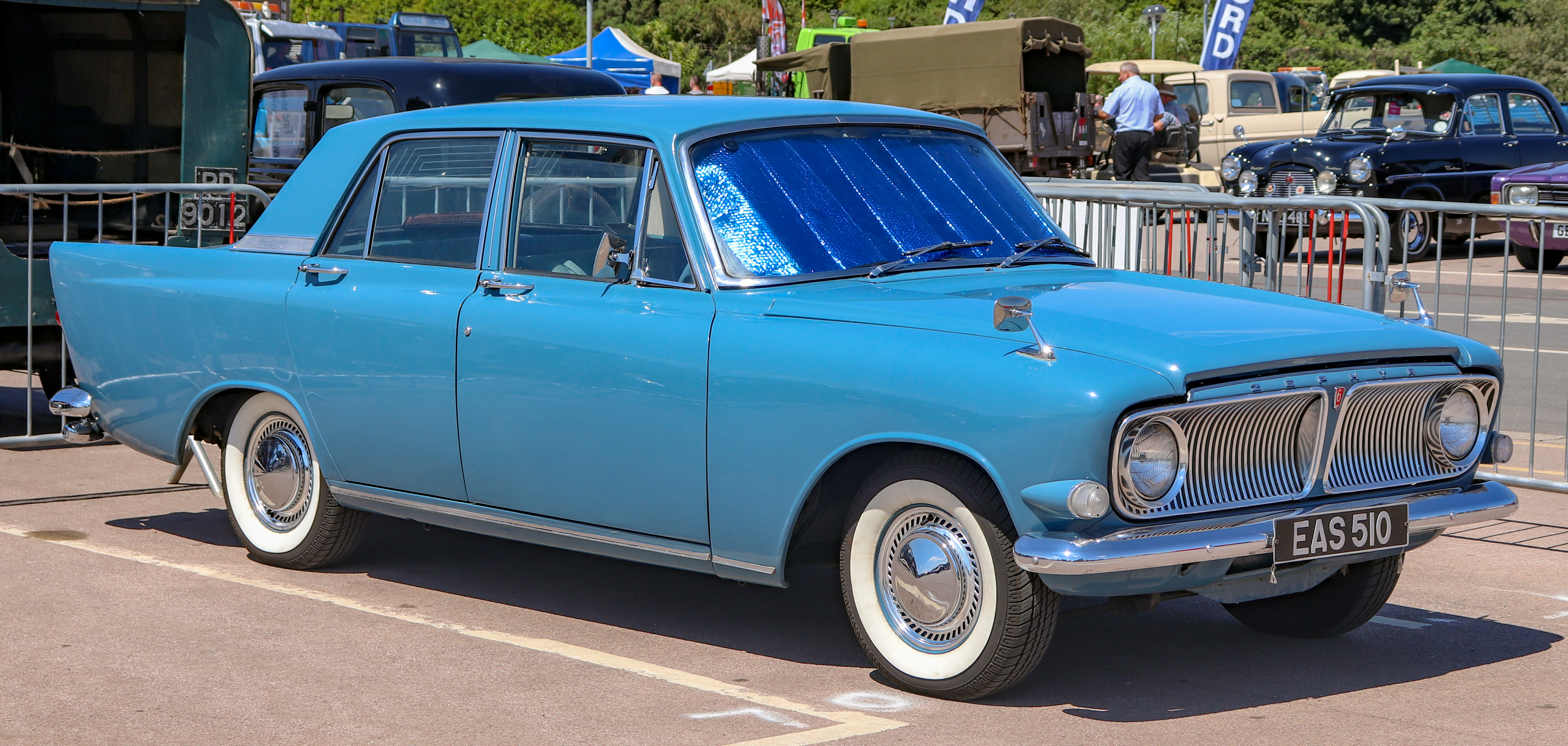
- Ford Zephyr 6 Mark III Saloon

Overview
- Manufacturer: Ford of Britain
- Production: 1950–1972
- Assembly: United Kingdom: Dagenham; Ireland: Cork; Australia: Geelong (Ford Australia); New Zealand: Lower Hutt (Ford NZ); Rhodesia: Salisbury (FMCR); South Africa: Port Elizabeth (FMCSA)

Body and chassis
- Class: Executive car (E)
- Body style: 4-door saloon; 5-door estate (conversion)

Chronology
- Predecessor: Ford Pilot
- Successor: Ford Consul; Ford Granada

The Ford Zephyr is an executive car manufactured by Ford of Britain from 1950 until 1972. The Zephyr and its luxury variants, the Ford Zodiac and Ford Executive, were the largest passenger cars in the British Ford range from 1950 until their replacement by the Consul and Granada models in 1972.

Initially, the four-cylinder version was named Ford Consul, but from 1962, both four- and six-cylinder versions were named Zephyr.

== History ==
The Mark I Ford Consul and Zephyr models were first displayed at the Earls Court Motor Show in 1950. They were the first mass-produced British cars to use the MacPherson strut independent front suspension, which is widely used today. Production began with the Consul on 1 January 1951. The Mark I model ran until 1956. From April 1956, the Mark II Consul, Zephyr, and Zodiac went on sale and were known as the Three Graces. The Mark II range was popular, and finished its run in 1962, when from April that year the Mark III Zephyr 4, Zephyr 6, and Zodiac went on sale. The Consul name was dropped, with the car's place in the Ford UK line-up being filled by the first four-cylinder Ford Zephyr. While the Mark II Zephyr and Zodiacs had shared the same body (the Consul had shorter front guards and bulkhead), the new Zodiac and Zephyrs launched in 1962 shared few body panels. With the Mark III, Ford finally sorted out problems that had beset previous models (Mark I axles and Mark II gearboxes were particular weaknesses) and the Mark III proved to be popular and the most durable of the range. The model sold at a rate equal to or better than the Mark II, both in the UK and overseas, but was in production for a shorter time. During the last months of production, an upmarket Executive version was added to the Mark III range. The Mk III range was discontinued in January 1966, and the completely new Zephyr/Zodiac Mark IV range was released in April 1966. This car's design anticipated the later Consul/Granada range with V-type engines and independent rear suspension, but the development of the model was rushed, which was reflected in its durability. It was one of the first medium-priced cars to feature rear disc brakes.

The Zephyr was the last car to be independently designed by Ford of Britain; closer integration with Ford-Werke of Cologne had already started with both the Transit and Escort, and the replacement Consul/Granada would be a genuine pan-European effort.

Although the Ford Zephyr never saw American production, a very limited number were imported into the U.S., and the name itself has appeared on other American Ford-related cars. The first use of the Zephyr name was in 1936 with the Lincoln Zephyr, a smaller companion to the full-sized Lincoln sedan sold at the time, followed in the late 1970s with the Mercury Zephyr, an upscale version of the Ford Fairmont. The Lincoln Zephyr name was resurrected for a new model in 2006, but was changed to Lincoln MKZ the following year.

== Mark I ==
=== Zephyr Six (or Zephyr Mark I) ===
Ford Zephyr Six
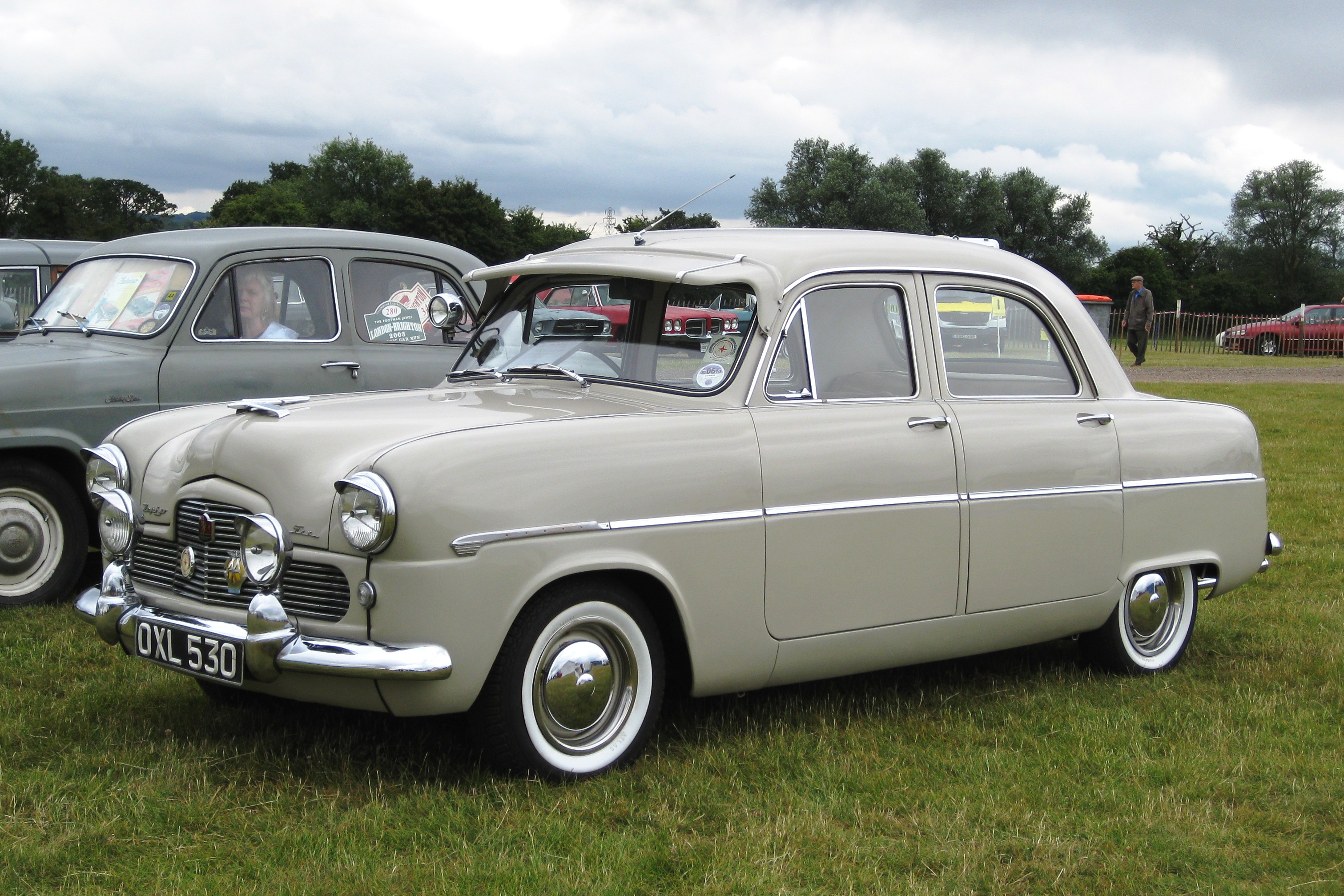

Overview
- Production: 1951–1956

Body and chassis
- Body style: 4-door saloon; 5-door estate (conversion); 2-door convertible (conversion)
- Related: Ford Consul I

Powertrain
- Engine: 2,262 cc (138 cu in) Zephyr ohv I6

Dimensions
- Wheelbase: 104 in (2,642 mm)
- Length: 172 in (4,369 mm)
- Width: 64 in (1,626 mm)
- Height: 60 in (1,524 mm)
- Curb weight: 2,464 lb (1,118 kg)

Model number EOTTA

The first of the Zephyr range was a lengthened version of the four-cylinder 1,508 cc (92 cu in) Consul, with a 2,262 cc (138 cu in) six-cylinder engine producing 68 bhp (51 kW). Like the Consul, the Zephyr came with a three-speed gearbox, controlled by a column-mounted lever (three-on-the-tree). The front suspension design employed what later came to be known as MacPherson struts while a more conventional configuration for the rear suspension used a live axle with half-elliptical springs. The car could reach just over 80 mph (130 km/h) and 23 mpg.

The Ford Zephyr Six was available with four-door saloon, estate, and two-door convertible bodies. The convertible version was made by Carbodies and had a power-operated hood; the estate car was by Abbotts of Farnham and was sold as the Farnham.

In addition to the main British Ford factory in Dagenham, the Consul and Zephyr were assembled at Ford New Zealand's Seaview factory in Lower Hutt from knock-down kits. The large Fords competed with the also locally built Vauxhall Wyvern and Velox, and later the Australian Holden. When newly crowned Queen Elizabeth II visited New Zealand as part of a Commonwealth tour in the early 1950s, she was pictured watching Zephyrs being built at the local Ford plant. The Consul and Zephyr were also assembled at the Cork plant in Ireland from 1951 to 1956.

In 1953, a Ford Zephyr Six driven by Maurice Gatsonides won the Monte Carlo rally, pushing a Jaguar Mark VII into second place in the process. Two years later, a Ford Zephyr Six driven by Vic Preston (Snr) and D. P. Marwaha won the East African Safari Rally.

A saloon tested by The Motor in 1951 had a top speed of 79.8 mph (128.4 km/h) and could accelerate from 0–60 mph (97 km/h) in 20.2 seconds. A fuel consumption of 23.7 miles per imperial gallon (11.9 L/100 km; 19.7 mpg_{‑US}) was recorded. The test car cost £842 including taxes, but was fitted with optional leather trim, heater, and radio.

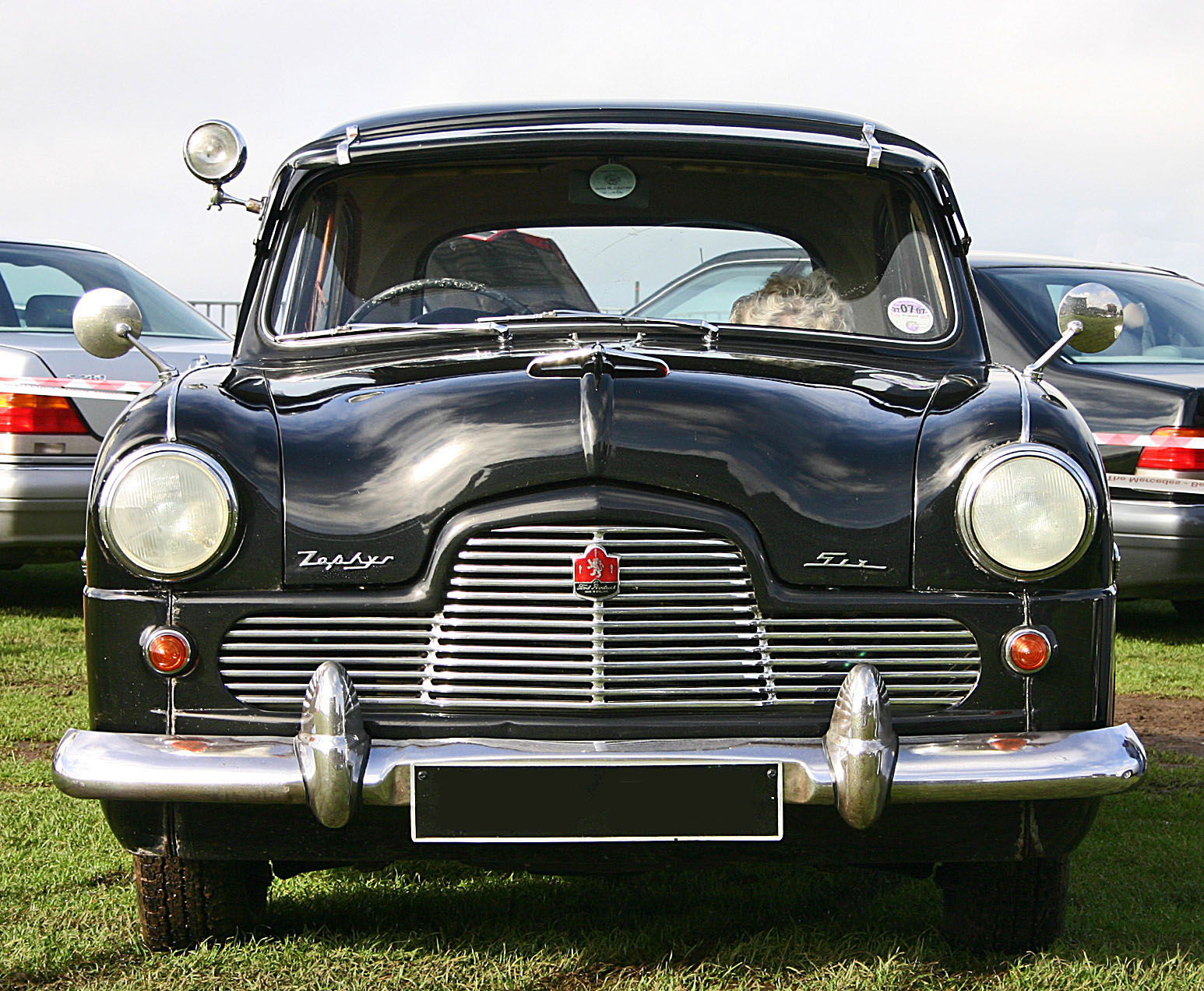
Ford Zephyr Mark I

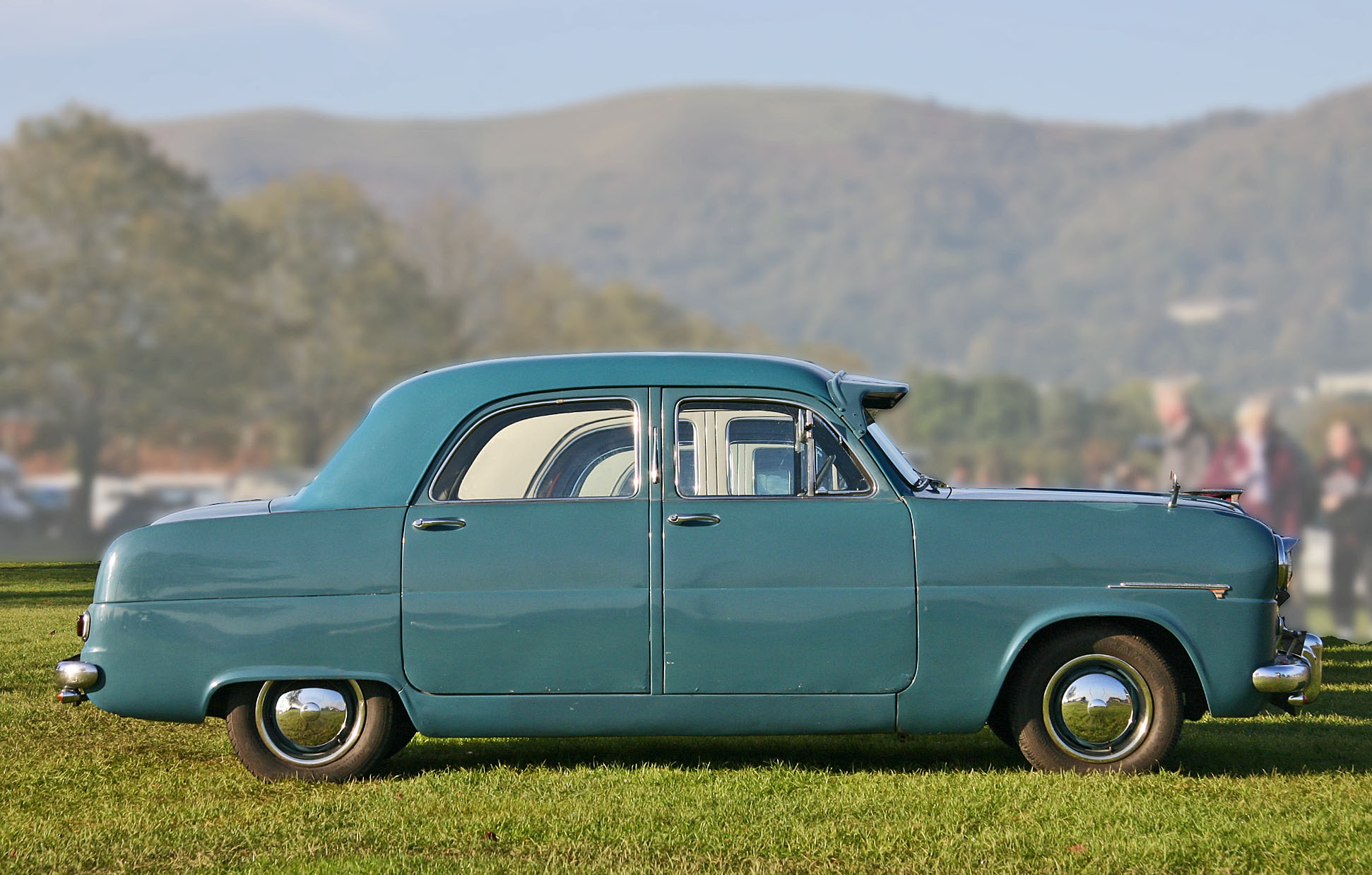

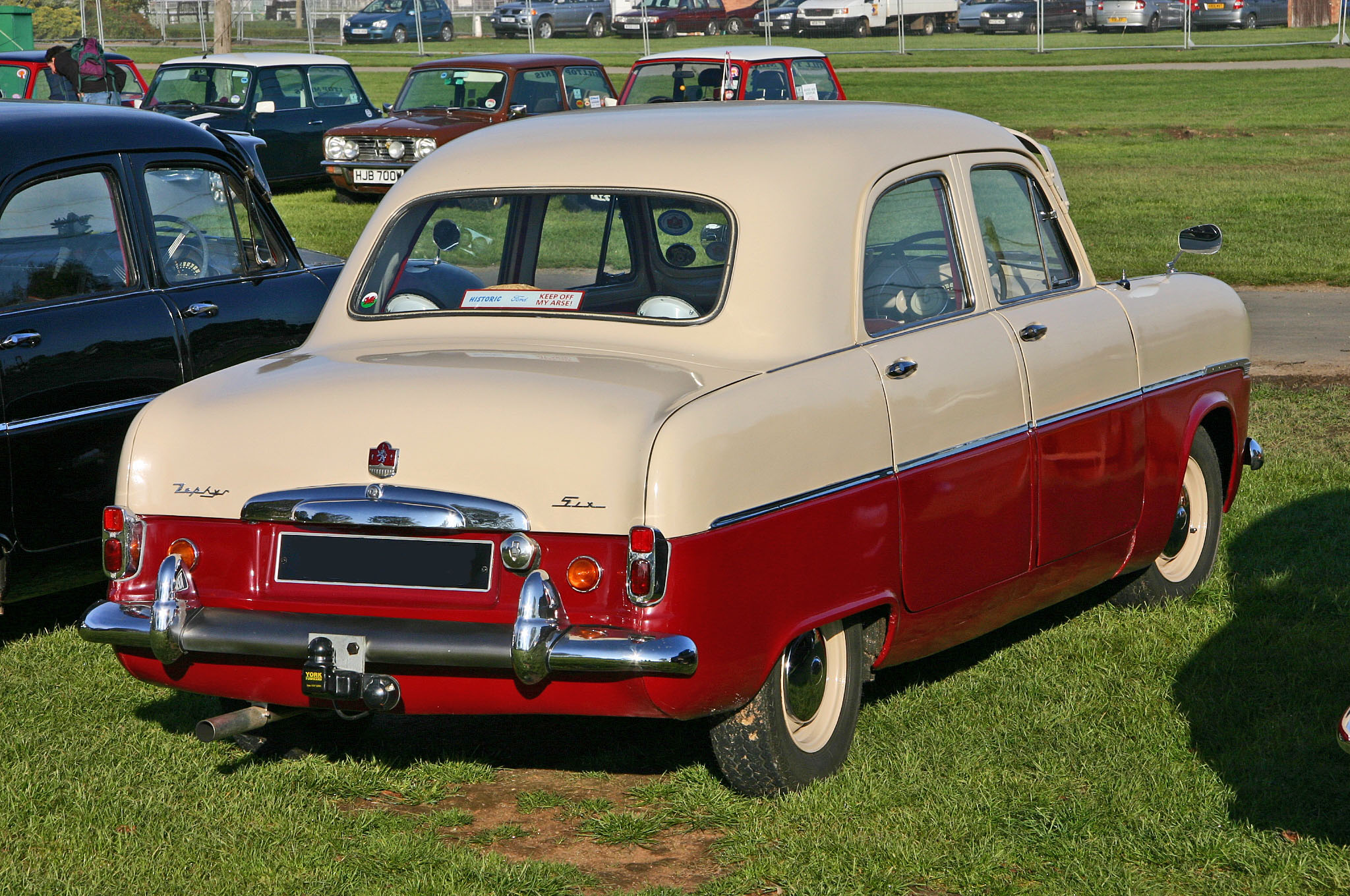

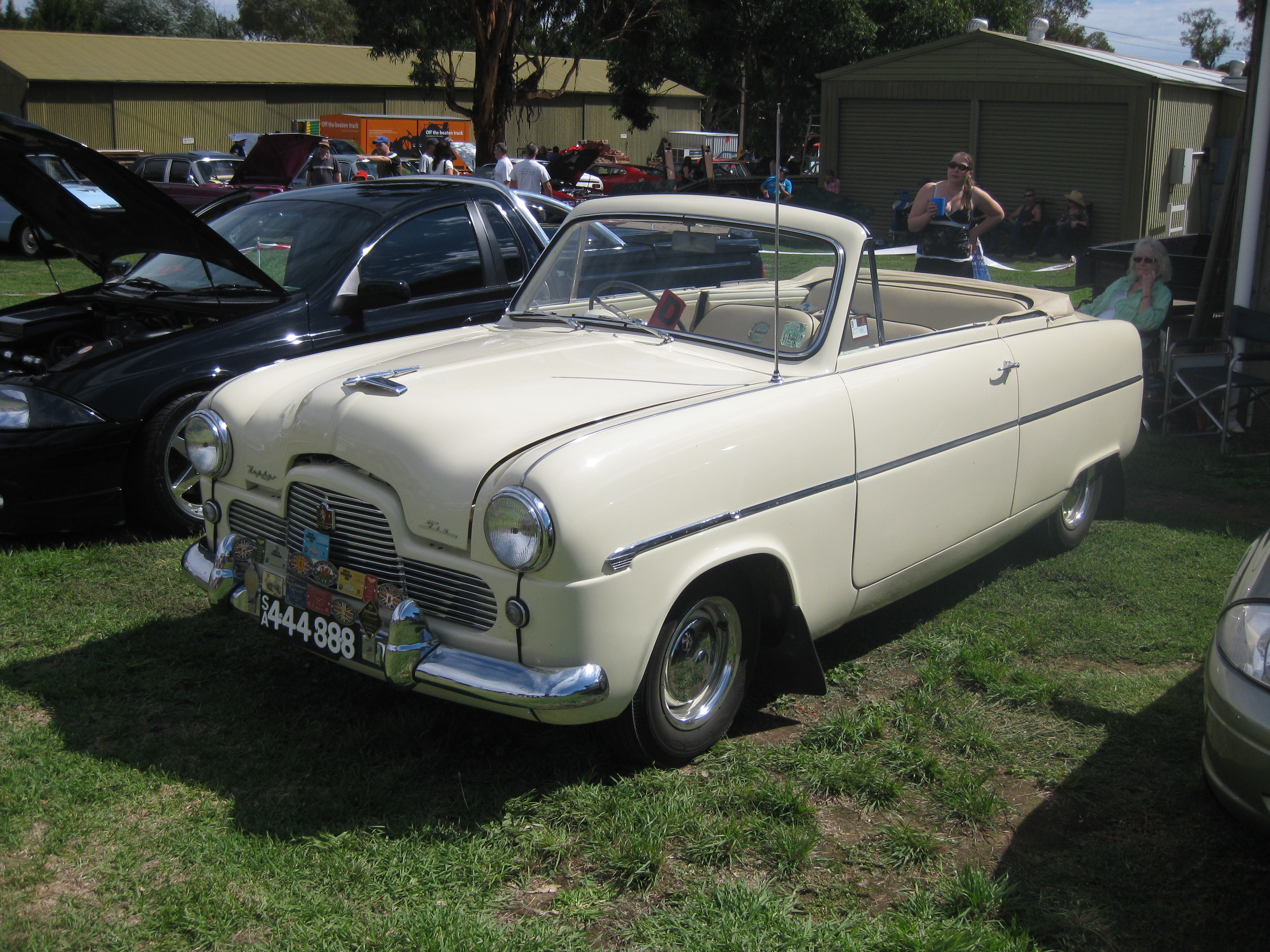
Ford Zephyr Convertible (Mark I)

=== Zephyr Zodiac (or Zodiac Mark I) ===
Ford Zephyr Zodiac
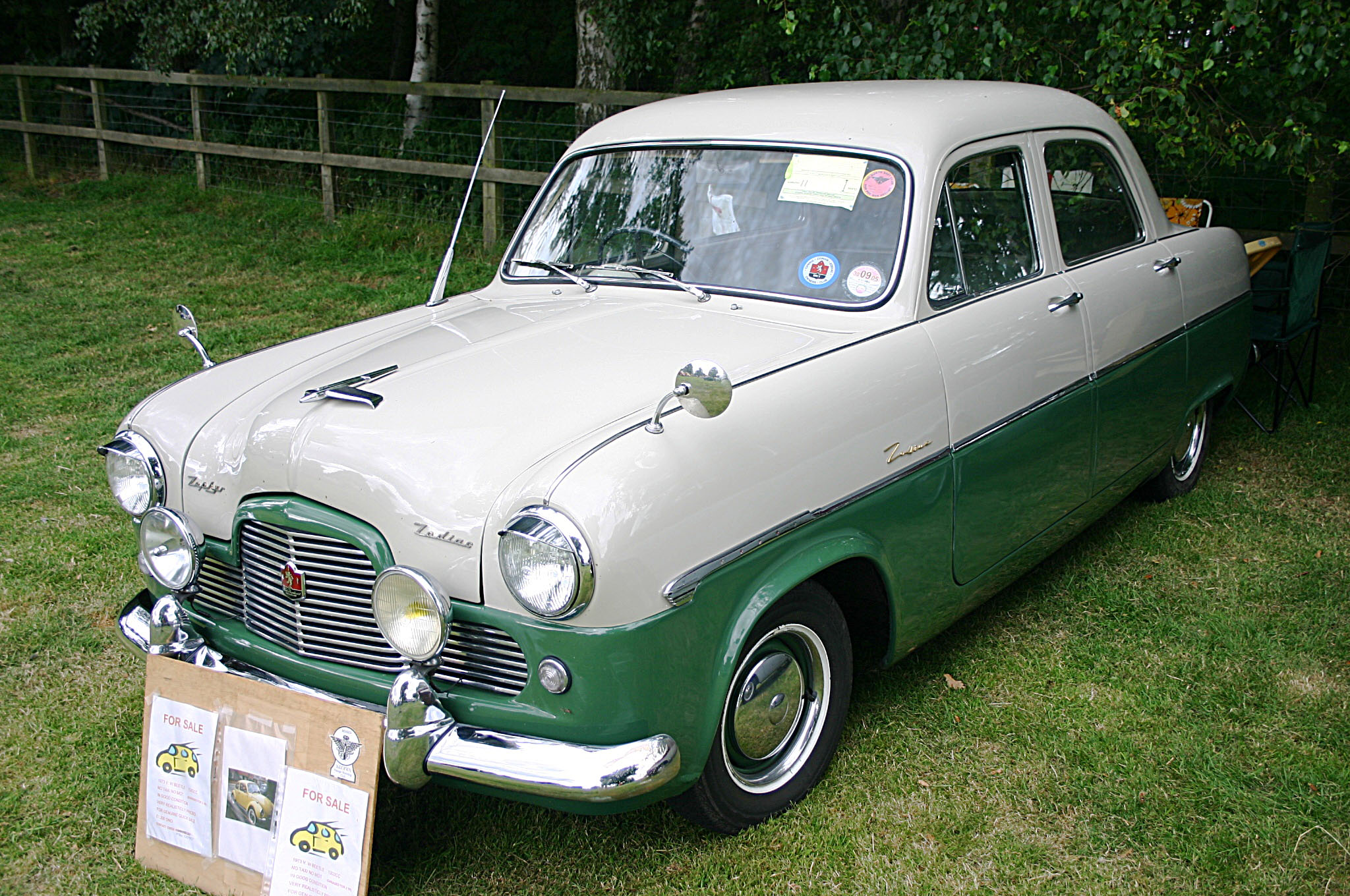

Overview
- Production: 1954–1956

Body and chassis
- Body style: 4-door saloon; 5-door estate (conversion)

Powertrain
- Engine: 2,262 cc (138 cu in) Zephyr ohv I6

Dimensions
- Curb weight: 2,680 lb (1,215 kg)

Model number EOTTA

The Zephyr Zodiac (or Zodiac Mark I) was an upmarket version of the Zephyr launched at the London Motor Show in autumn 1953. It had two-tone paintwork, leather trim, a heater, windscreen washers, whitewall tyres, and spot lights. The engine had a higher compression ratio – 7.5:1 instead of 6.8:1 – increasing the maximum power to 71 bhp (53 kW).

A car tested by The Motor in 1955 had a top speed of 80 mph (130 km/h) and could accelerate from 0-60 mph (97 km/h) in 20.2 seconds. A fuel consumption of 22.2 miles per imperial gallon (12.7 L/100 km; 18.5 mpg_{‑US}) was recorded. The test car cost £851 including taxes.

No official records exist of Zephyr Zodiac convertibles being produced, but a few estate cars were built.

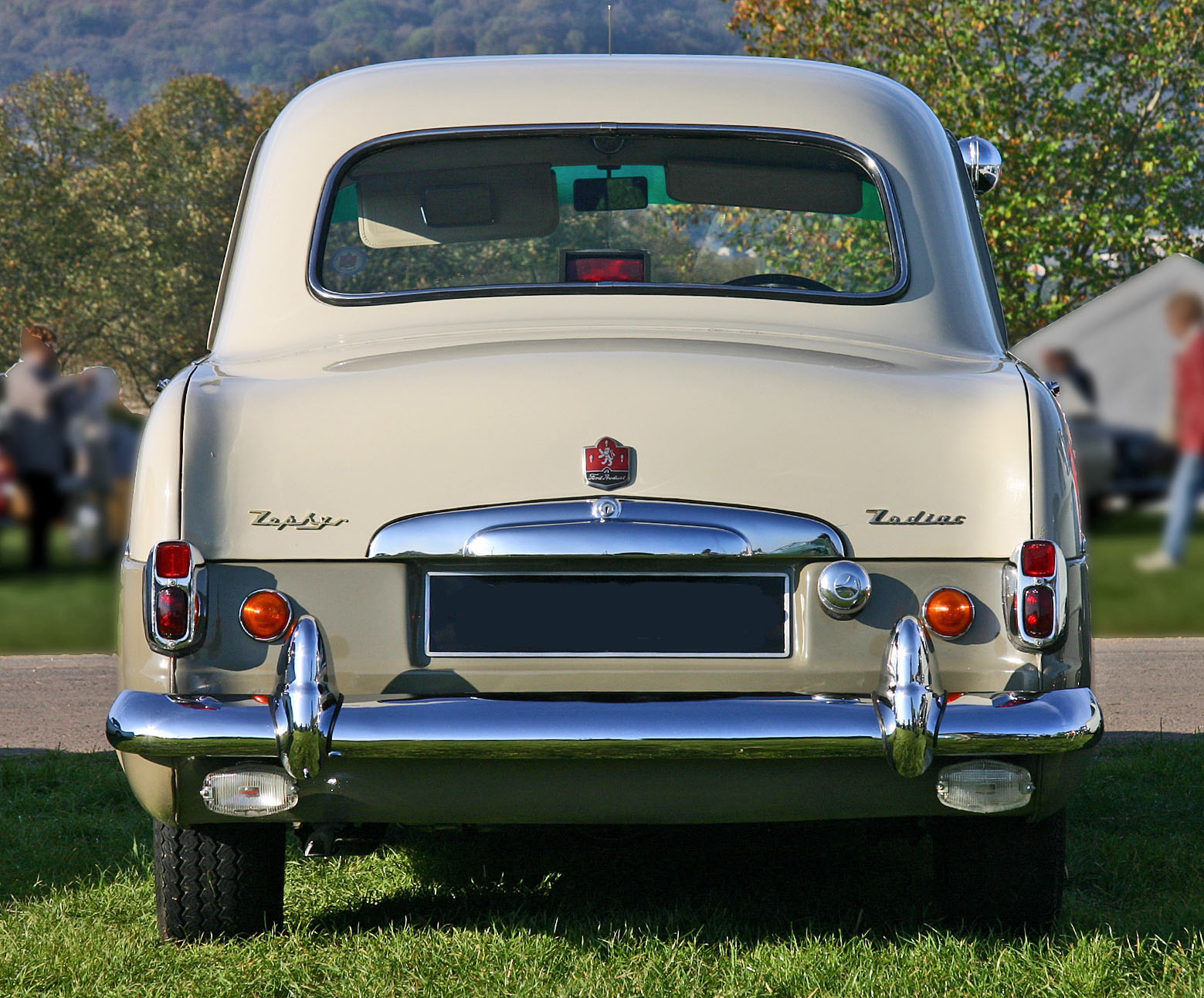
Ford Zodiac Mark I

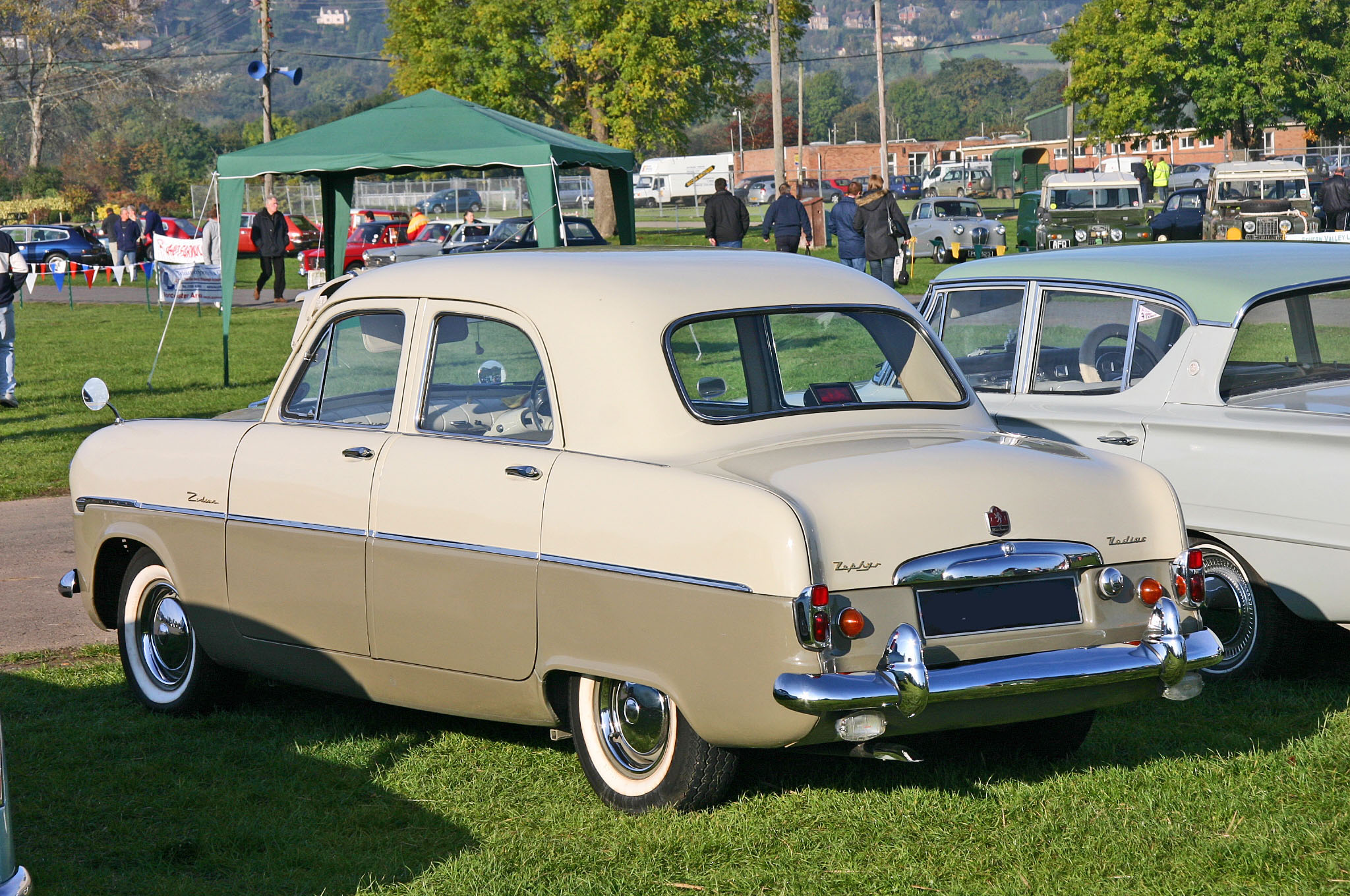
Rear side view

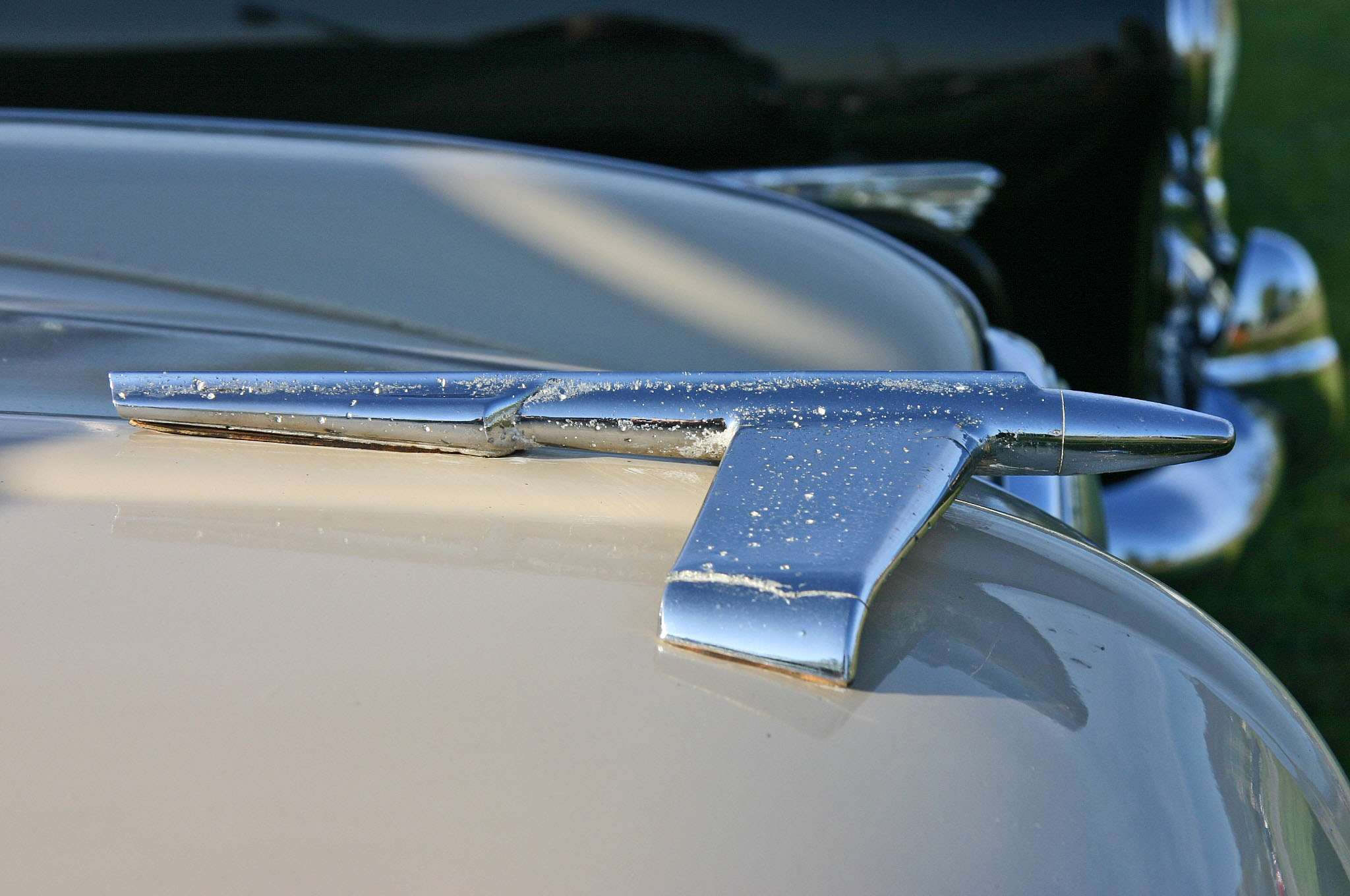
Zodiac ornament

== Mark II ==
=== Zephyr Mark II ===
Ford Zephyr Mark II
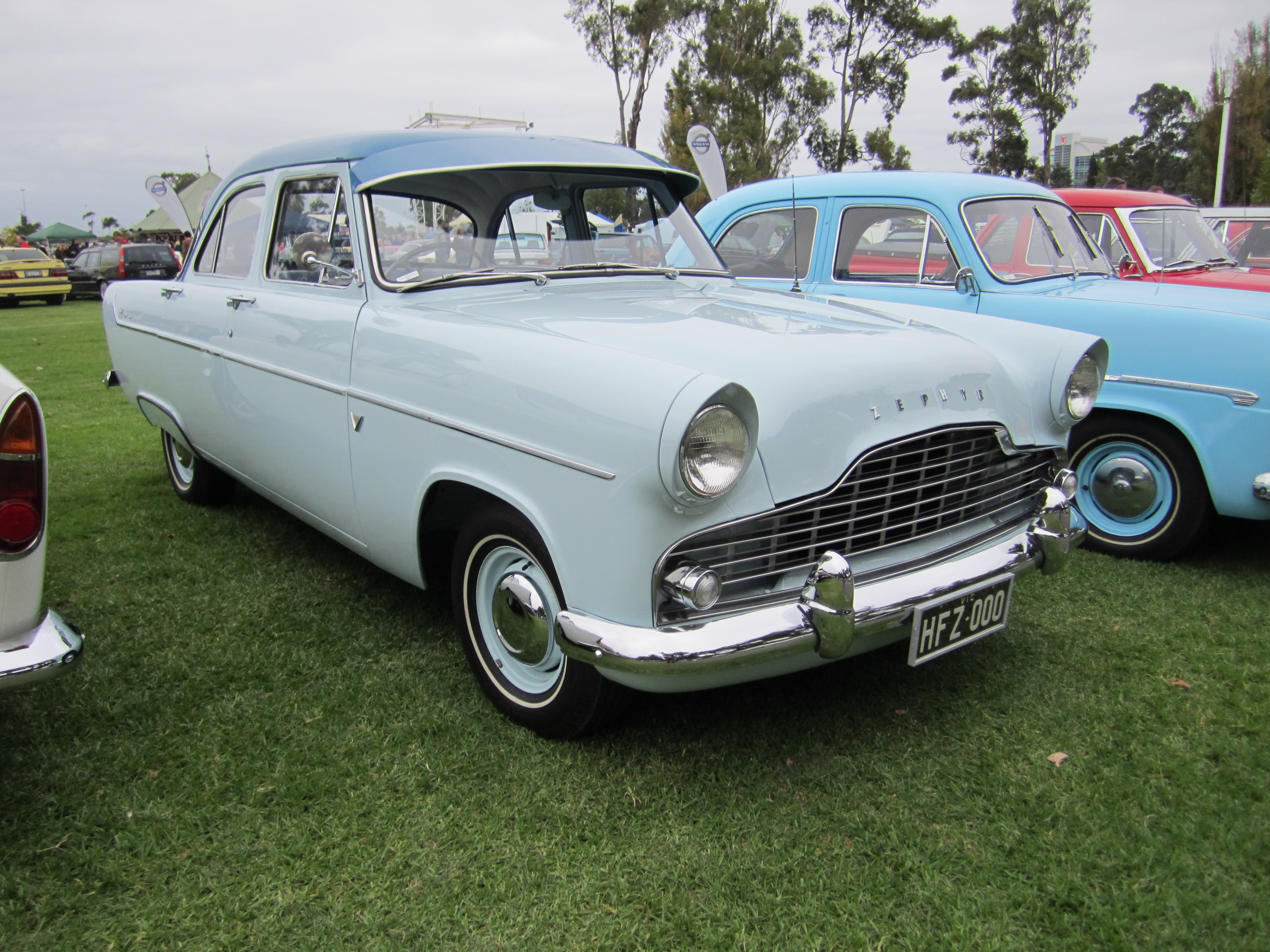
- Ford Zephyr Mark II Saloon

Overview
- Production: 1956–1962

Body and chassis
- Body style: 4-door saloon ("sedan" in Australia); 5-door station wagon (Australia); 2-door coupe utility (Australia); 5-door estate (conversion); 2-door convertible (conversion)
- Related: Ford Consul II

Powertrain
- Engine: 2,553 cc (156 cu in) Zephyr ohv I6

Dimensions
- Wheelbase: 107 in (2,718 mm)
- Length: 178.5 in (4,534 mm)
- Width: 67 in (1,702 mm)
- Curb weight: 2,576 lb (1,168 kg)

Model number 206E

In 1956, the Consul, Zephyr, and Zodiac were all restyled. The six-cylinder cars' engines were enlarged to 2,553 cc (156 cu in), with power output correspondingly raised to 86 bhp (64 kW). The wheelbase was increased by 3 inches (76 mm) to 107 inches (2,700 mm) and the width increased to 69 inches (1,800 mm). The weight distribution and turning circle were also improved. Top speed increased to 88 mph (142 km/h), and the fuel consumption was also improved at 28 mpg_{‑imp} (10 L/100 km; 23 mpg_{‑US}).

The Zodiac and Zephyr were also offered in two body styles, the "Highline" and "Lowline", depending on the year of manufacture – the difference being 1.75 in (44 mm) being cut from the height of the roof panel. The "Highline" variant featured a hemispherical instrument cluster, whereas the "Lowline" had a more rectangular panel.

The performance of the Zephyr and the Zodiac series II models likely was restricted by the rudimentary exhaust system, both the manifold assembly and the exhaust itself. The well-known Raymond Mays complete engine conversion boosted the performance figures to a top speed of 101 mph and 0–60 to 10.0s, with a standing quarter mile of 17.6s, as recorded by The Autocar in the issue dated 8 November 1957.

As well as a three-speed manual gearbox, an overdrive was optional, and from 1956 (1959 in Australia), a Borg Warner DG automatic transmission was available. At first, drum brakes were fitted all round (with a larger lining area of 147 sq in or 950 cm^{2}), but front discs became optional in 1960 and standard from mid-1961 (in Australia, only four-wheel drum brakes were available; some dealers fitted servo-assistance from 1961).

A two-door convertible version was offered with power-operated hood. Because of the structural weaknesses inherent in the construction of convertibles, few survive.

A convertible with overdrive tested by The Motor in 1961 had a top speed of 88.3 mph (142.1 km/h) and could accelerate from 0-60 mph (97 km/h) in 17.0 seconds. A fuel consumption of 24.5 miles per imperial gallon (11.5 L/100 km; 20.4 mpg_{‑US}) was recorded. The test car cost £1193 including taxes.

==== Australian production ====
In Australia, the Mark II Consul, Zephyr, and Zodiac were built at Ford Australia's factory in Geelong. Sedan, coupe utility (more commonly abbreviated to "Ute"), and both four-cylinder Consul and six-cylinder Zephyr station wagon versions were produced. No Zodiac version station wagons were offered. The Australian-developed Mark II Station Wagon differed from its British Estate Car counterpart in having a wind-up rear window, and a straight C pillar, rather than a curved one. A handful of Station Wagons were registered in 1958, but sales did not really commence until about halfway through 1959. Also, the Australian-designed and -developed ute version differed significantly in its cab design and rear panels to that of its British counterpart. Mark II manufacture continued until 1962, when production switched to the assembly of Mark IIIs from imported complete knock-down (CKD) kits. It had originally been planned by Ford Australia to facelift the Mark II as its main competitor to the rival Holden, but due to the exorbitant price being asked for by Ford UK for its now redundant production jigs for the Mark II, Ford Australia chose to instead locally manufacture the newly released North American Ford Falcon, which was significantly cheaper to manufacturer than the Zephyr, with the Mark III being relegated to special order only.

==== New Zealand assembly ====
New Zealand assembly of the Mark II, also from CKD kits, now included the Zodiac. The big Fords from Britain were now offered alongside the Australian-sourced Ford Falcon and also competed with the Vauxhall Victor and Velox, Holden, and Australia's Chrysler Valiant. Supplies were restricted due to strict import licensing rules in place at the time, and demand always exceeded availability; not uncommonly, buyers waited two to three years for their new big Ford.

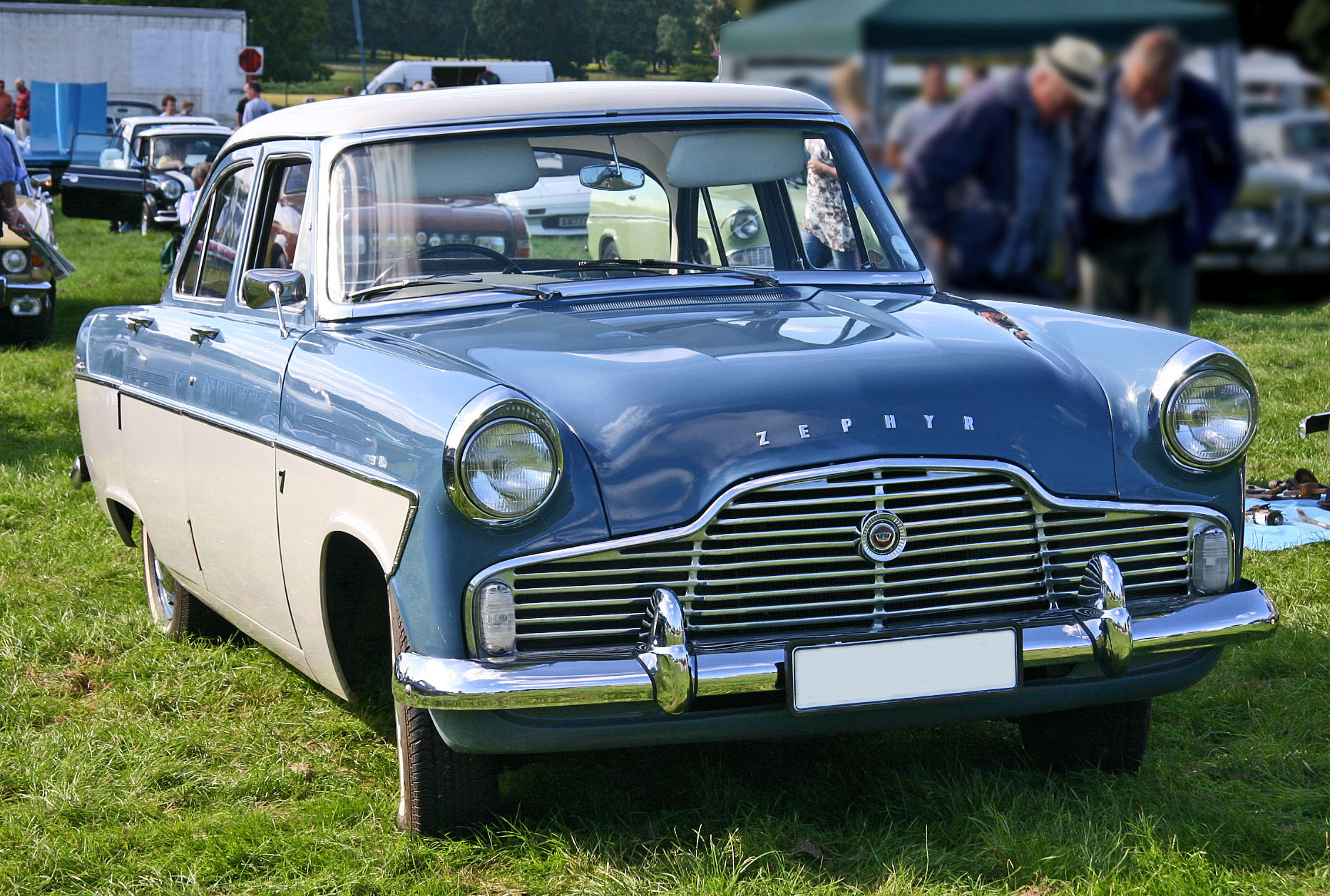
Ford Zephyr Mark II "Lowline" Saloon

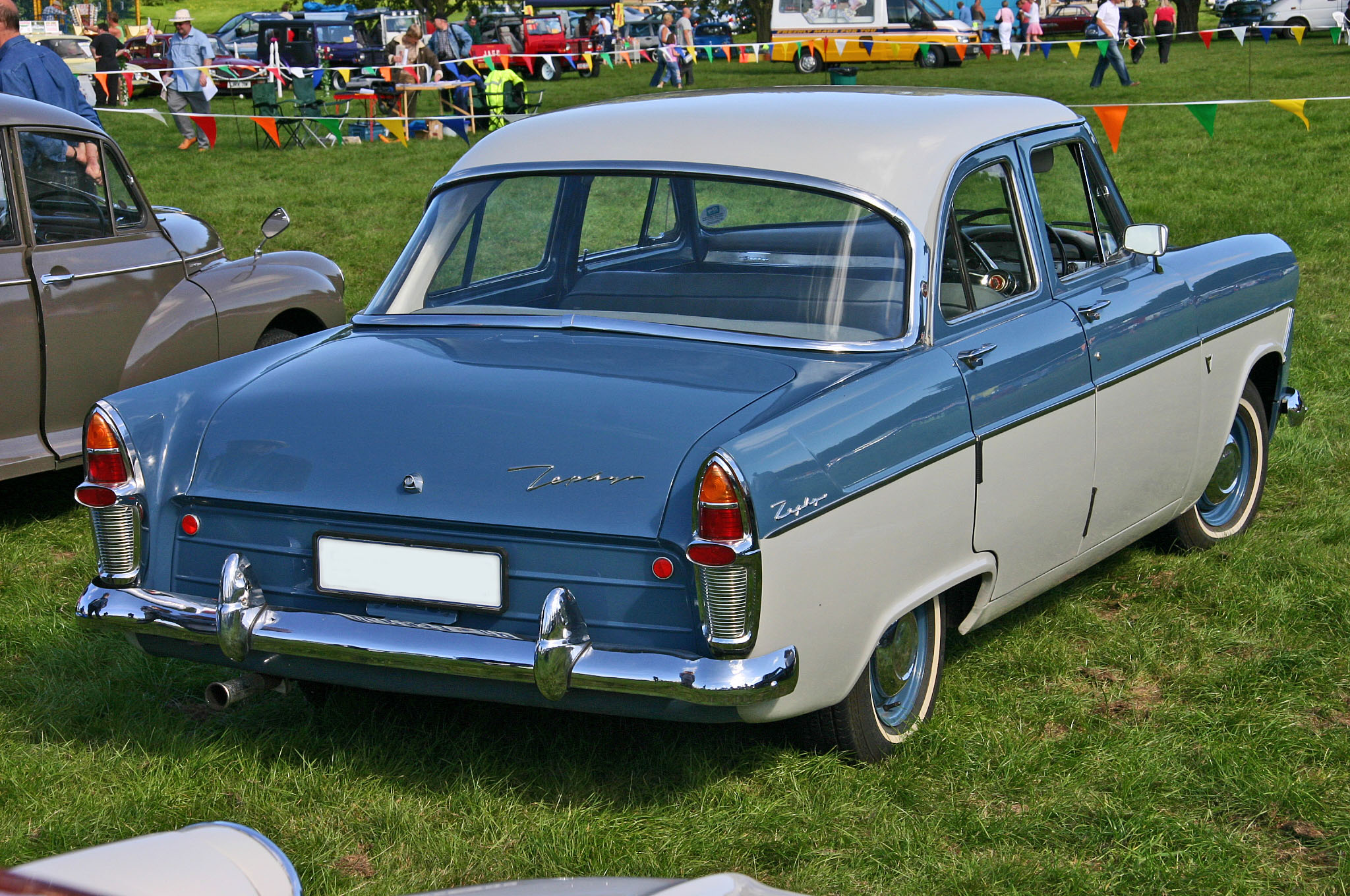

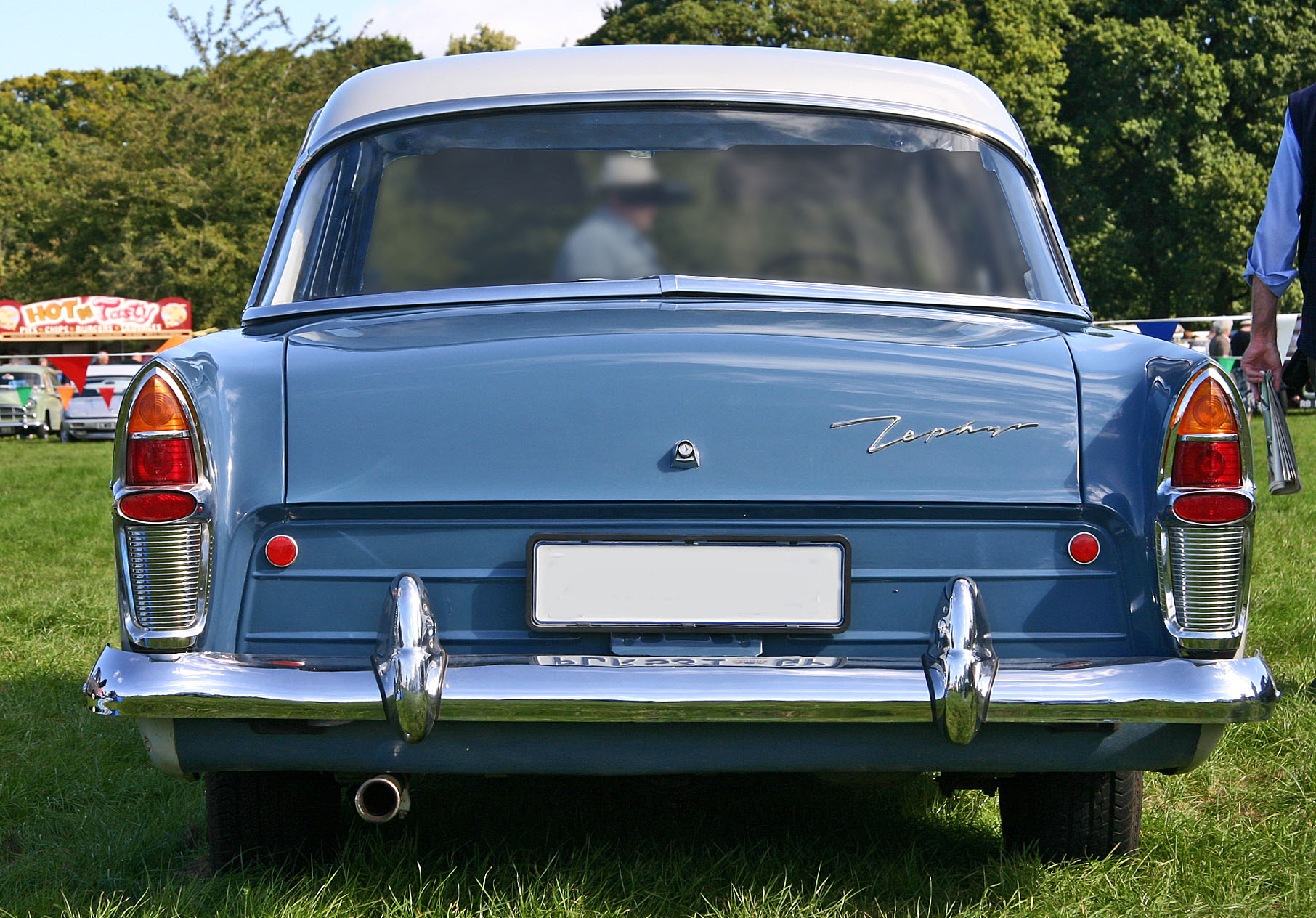

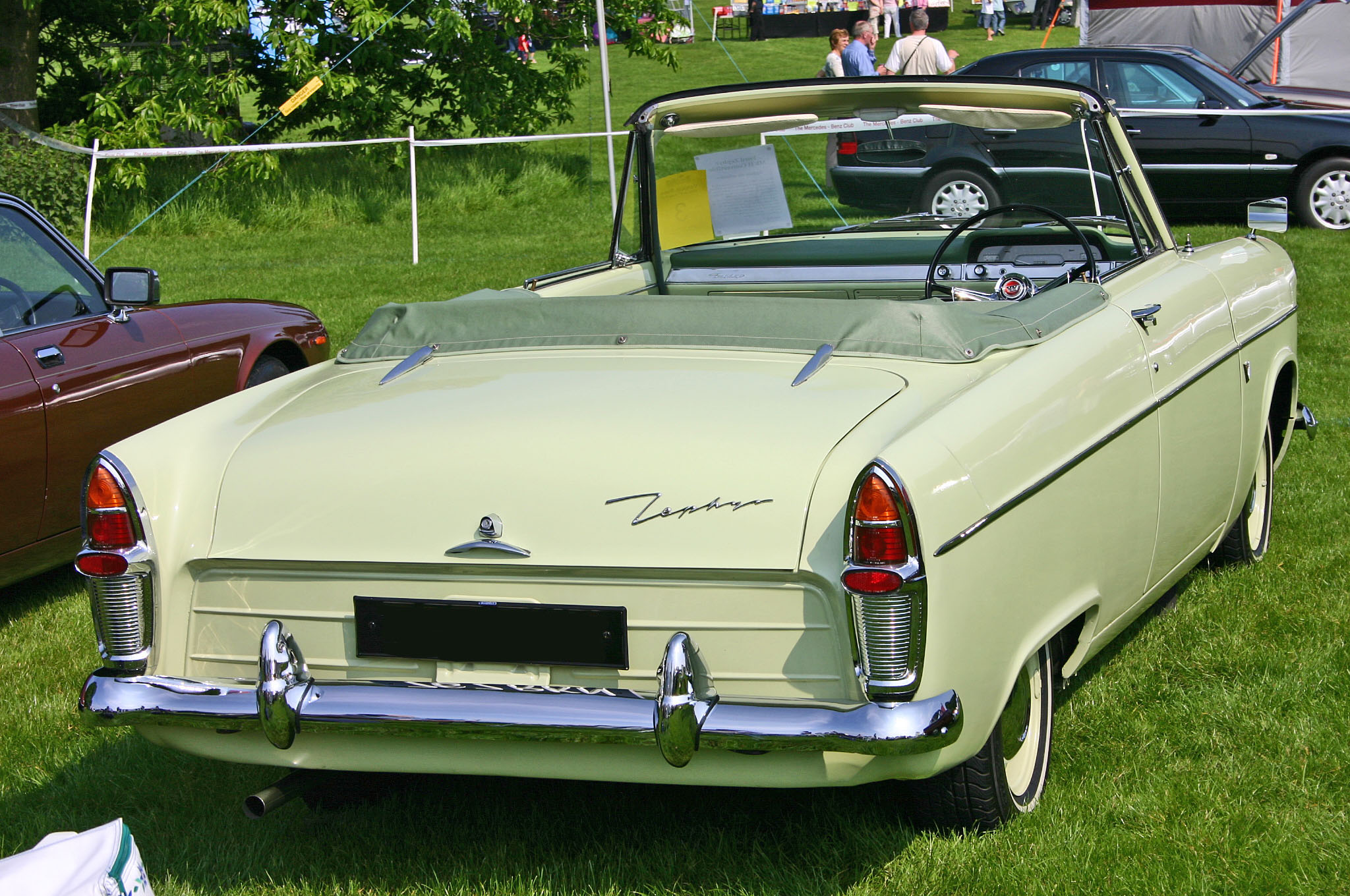
Ford Zephyr Mark II Convertible (by Carbodies)

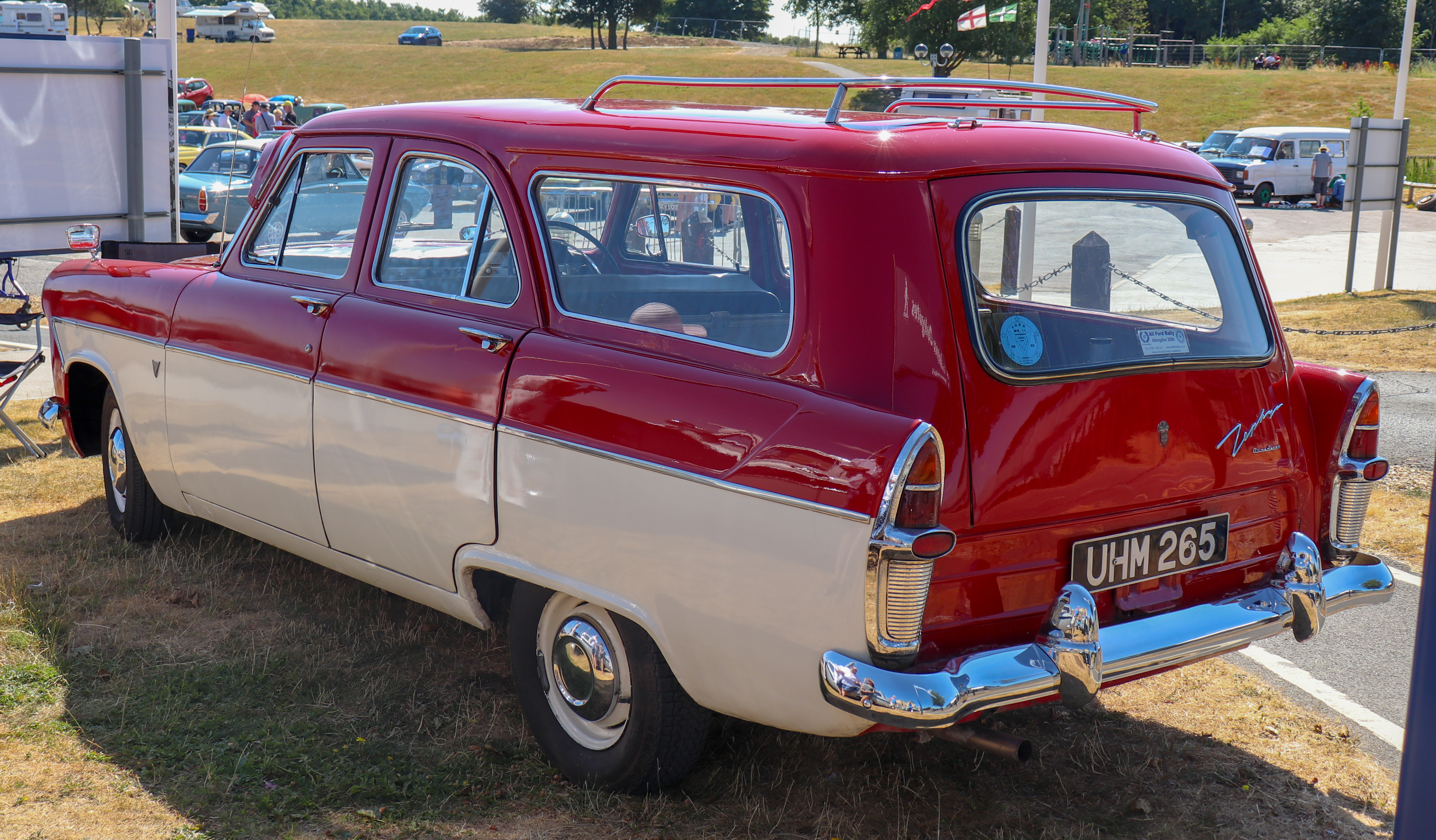
Ford Zephyr Mark II Estate

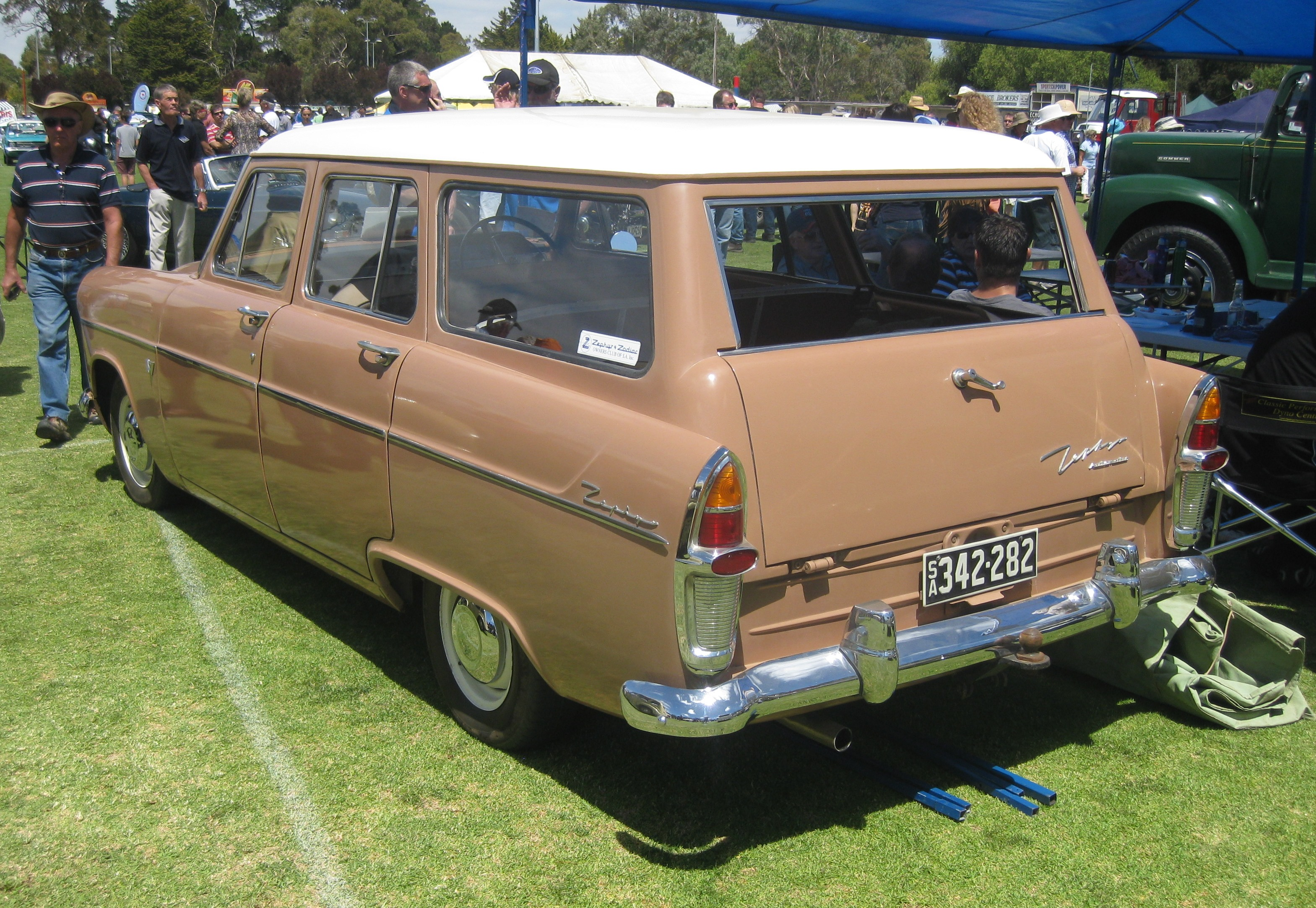
Australian Ford Zephyr Mark II Station Wagon

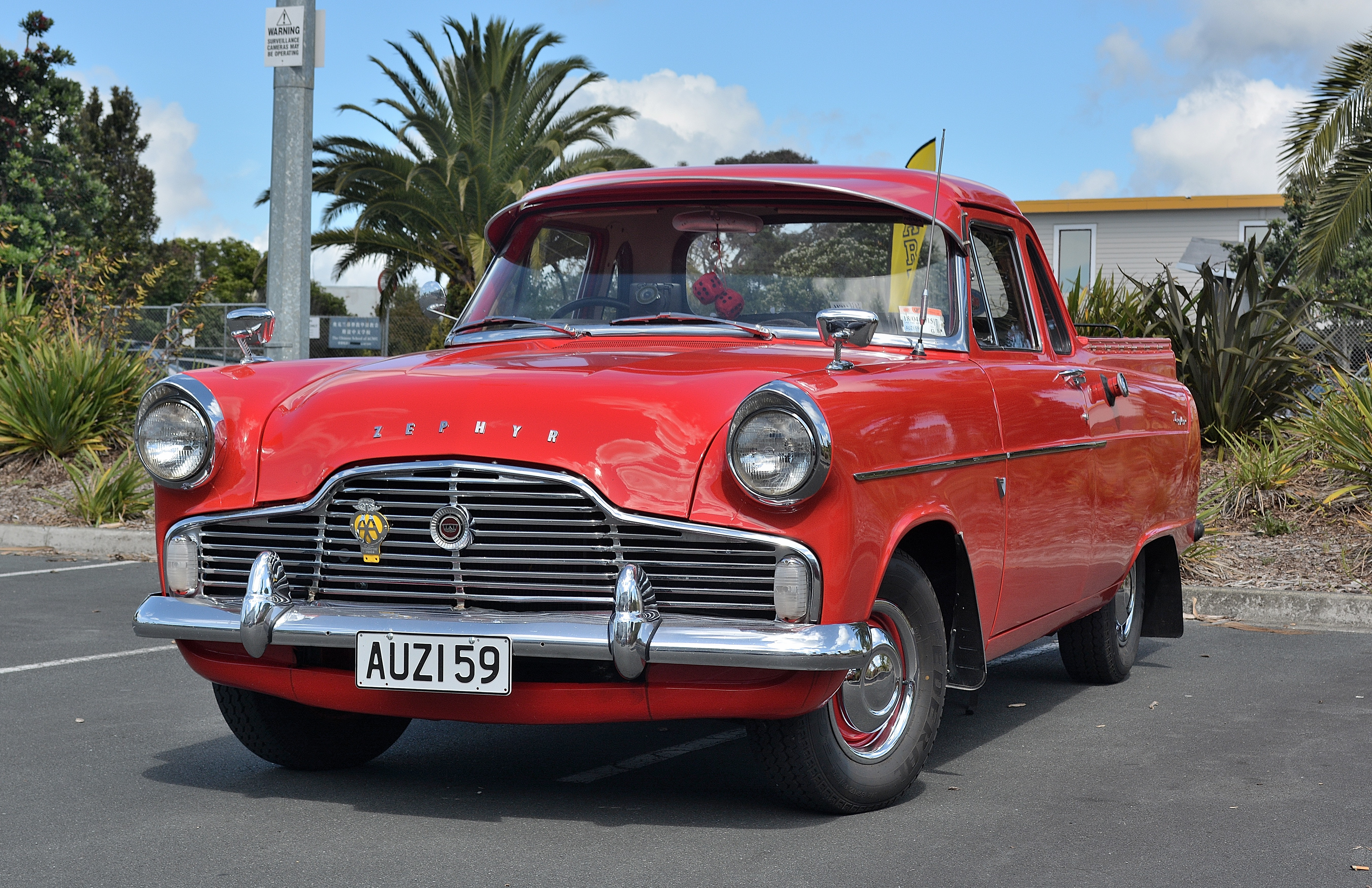
Australian Ford Zephyr Mark II Coupe Utility

=== Zodiac Mark II ===
Ford Zodiac Mark II
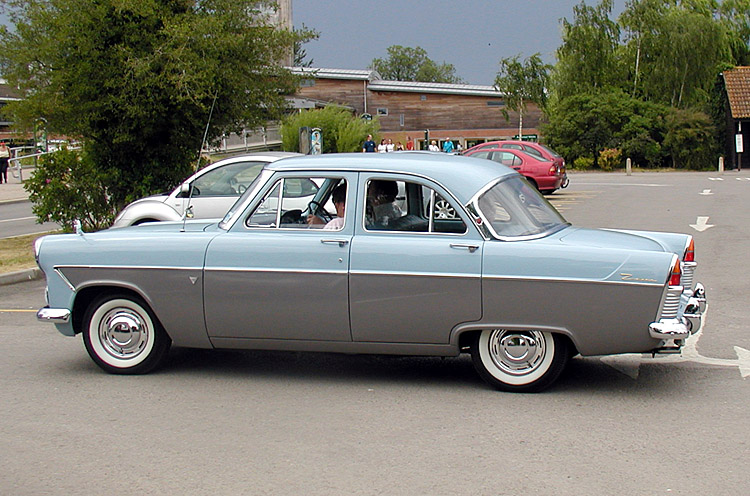

Overview
- Production: 1956–1962

Body and chassis
- Body style: 4-door saloon; 5-door estate (conversion); 2-door convertible (conversion)

Powertrain
- Engine: 2,553 cc (156 cu in) Zephyr ohv I6

Model number 206E

The Mark II Zodiac was slightly altered to distinguish it from the lesser variants, having more elaborate tail-end styling and at the front, a different grille. The auxiliary lamps and wing mirrors were deleted from the Zodiac range, but it retained two-tone paint, whitewall tyres, chrome wheel-trim embellishers, and gold-plated badges.

A car tested by the British magazine The Motor in 1956 had a top speed of 87.9 mph (141.5 km/h) and could accelerate from 0-60 mph (97 km/h) in 17.1 seconds. A fuel consumption of 21.5 miles per imperial gallon (13.1 L/100 km; 17.9 mpg_{‑US}) was recorded. The test car cost £968 including taxes.

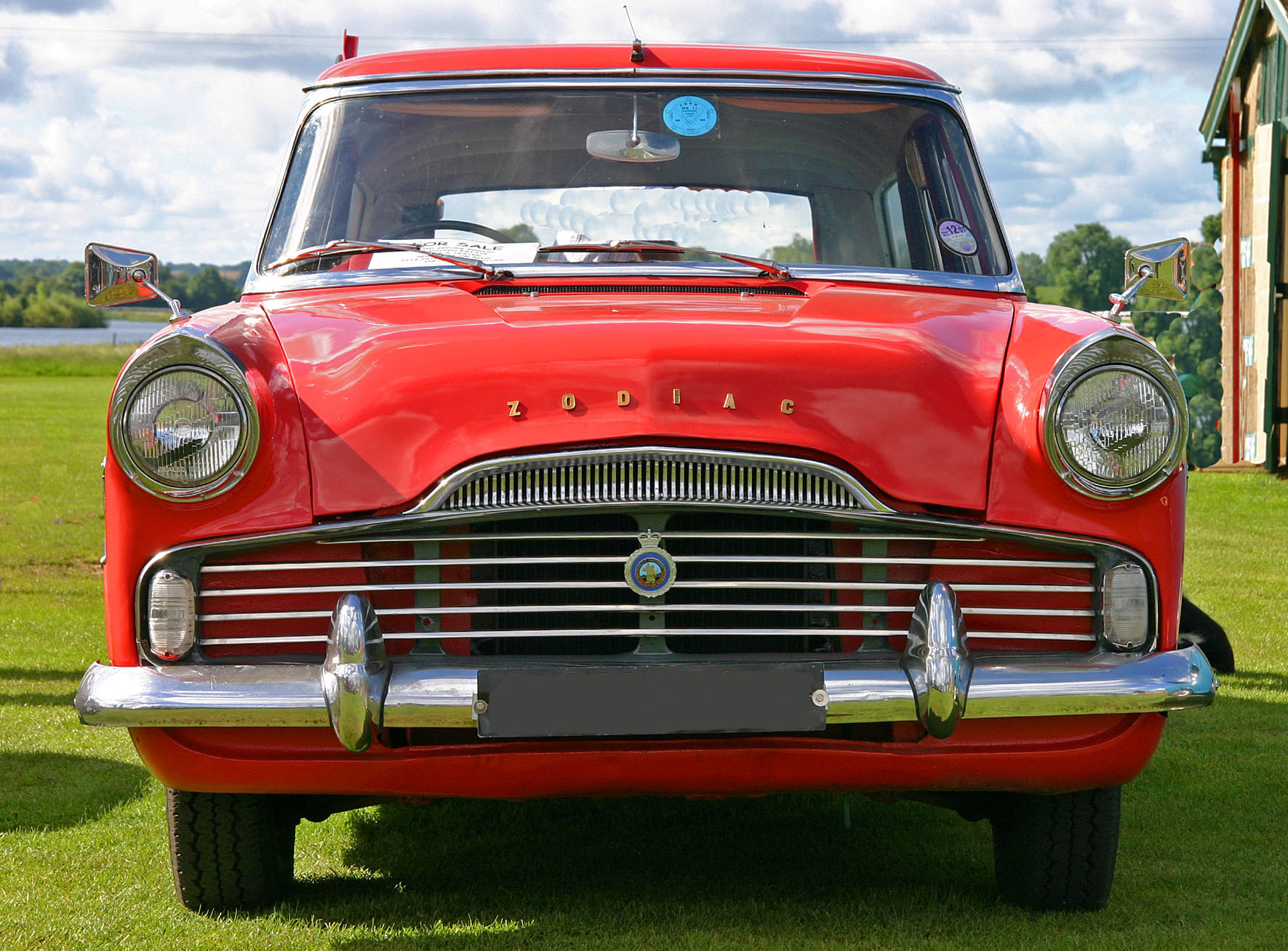
Zodiac Mark II

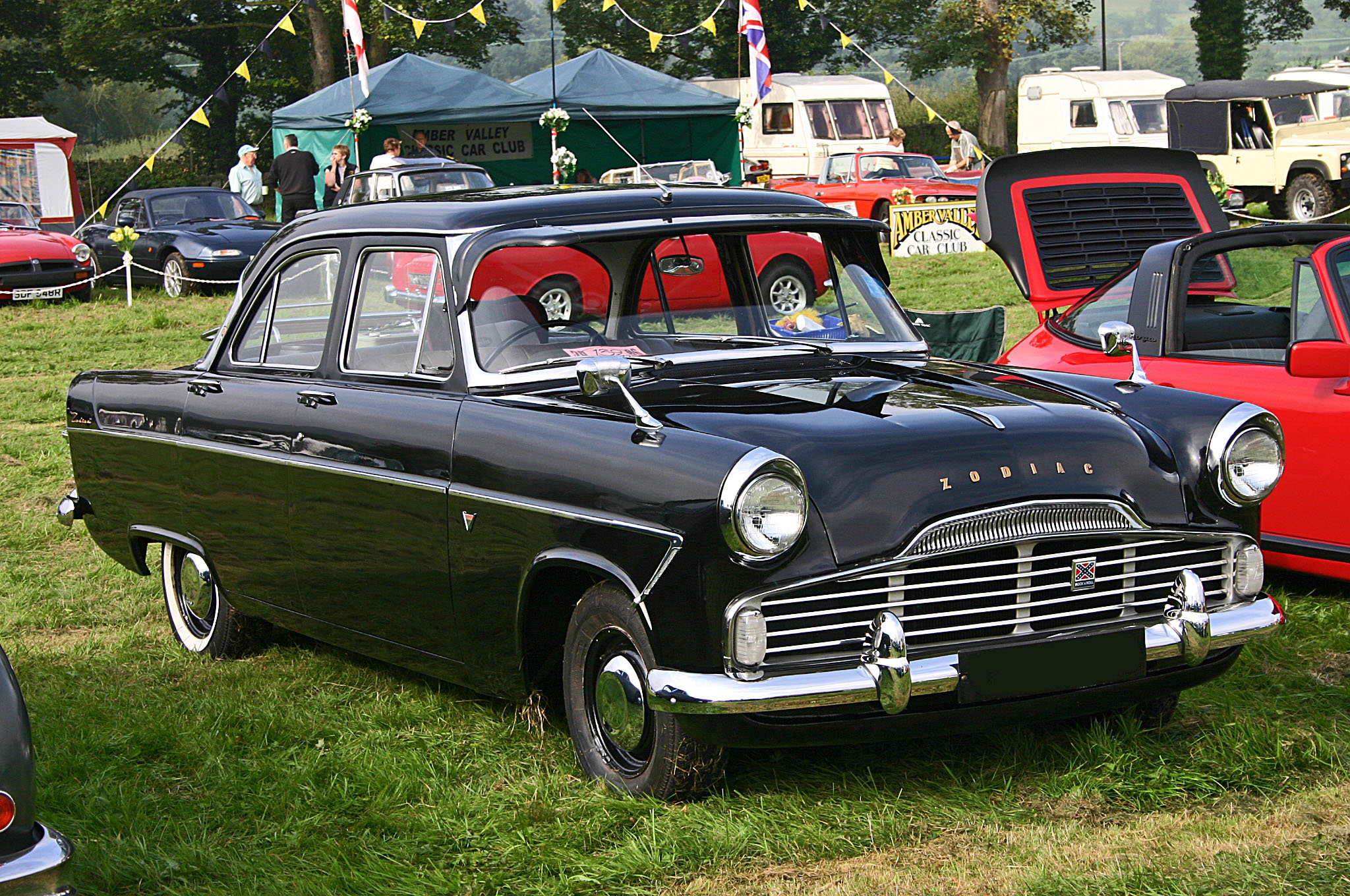

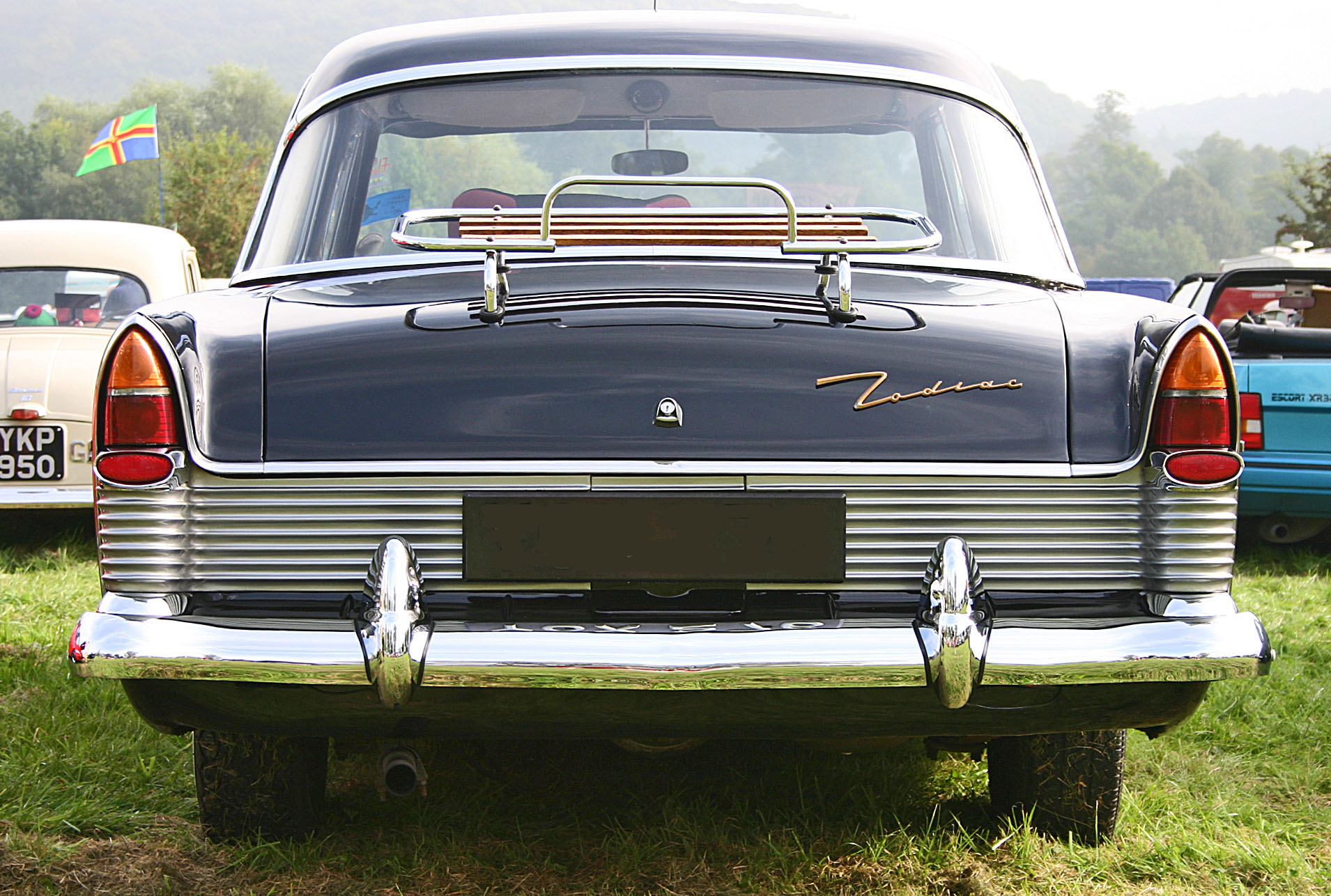

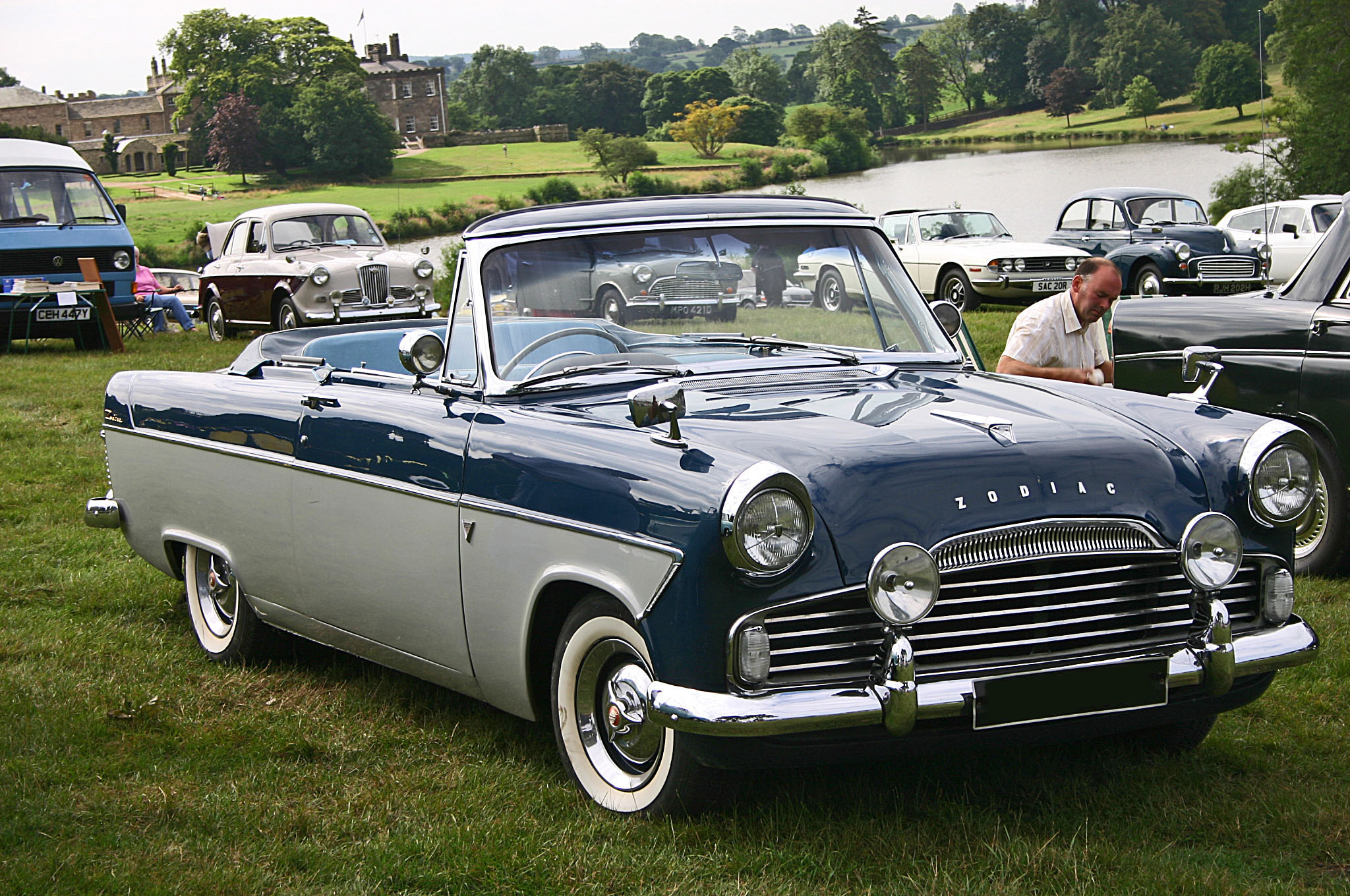
Convertible Zodiac

=== Abbott (Farnham) Estates ===
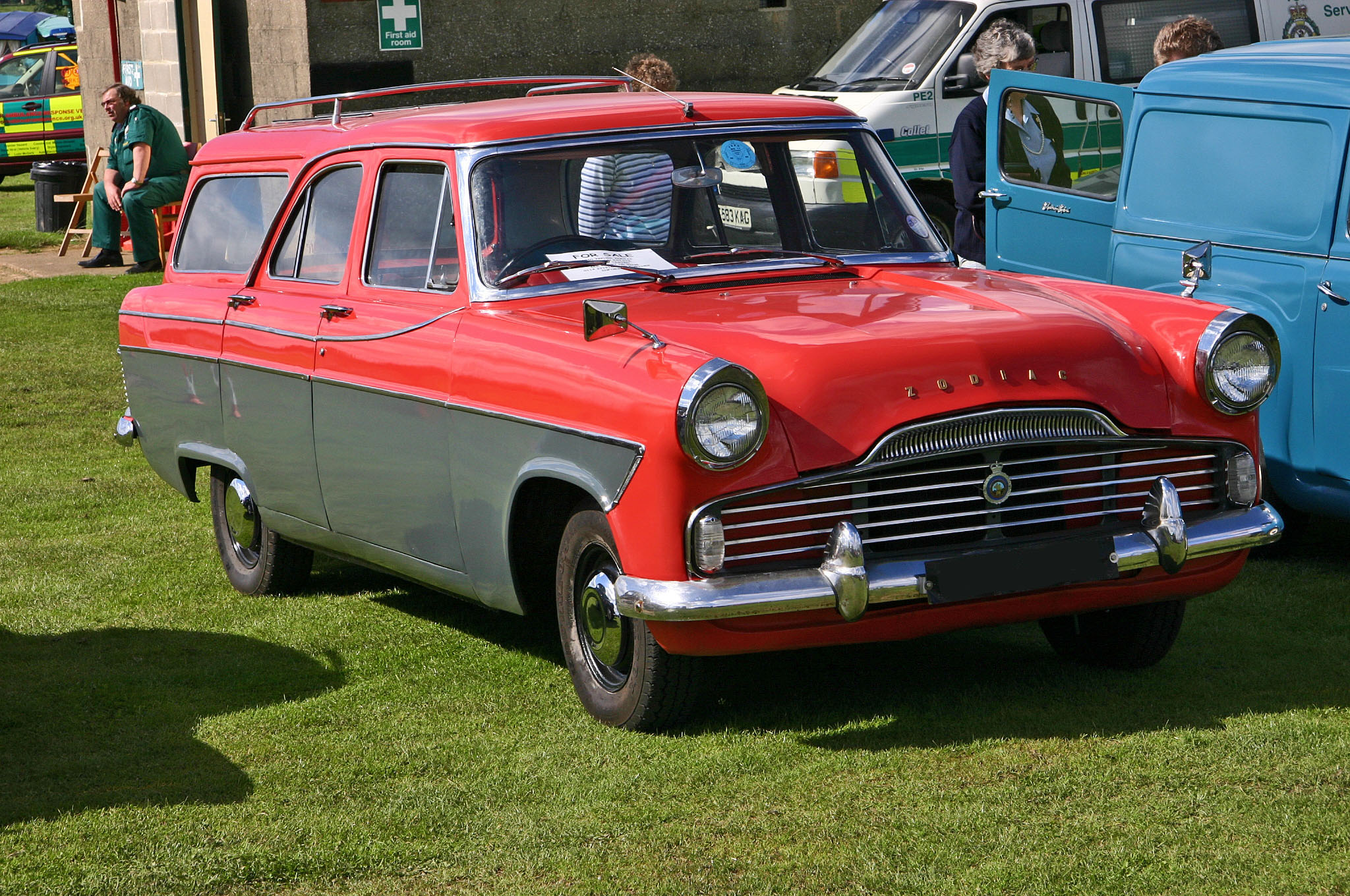
Zodiac Mark II 206E Abbott estate

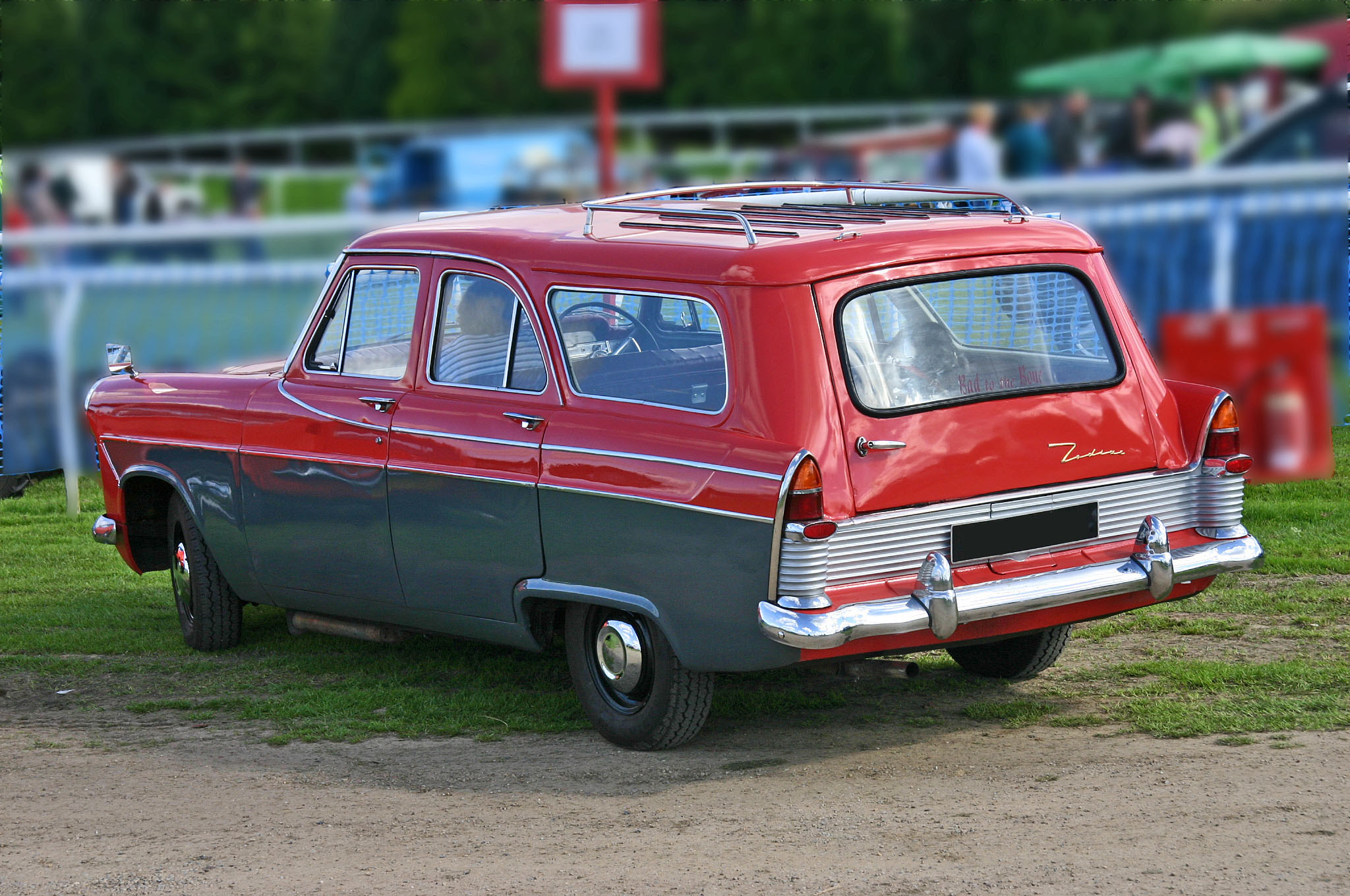

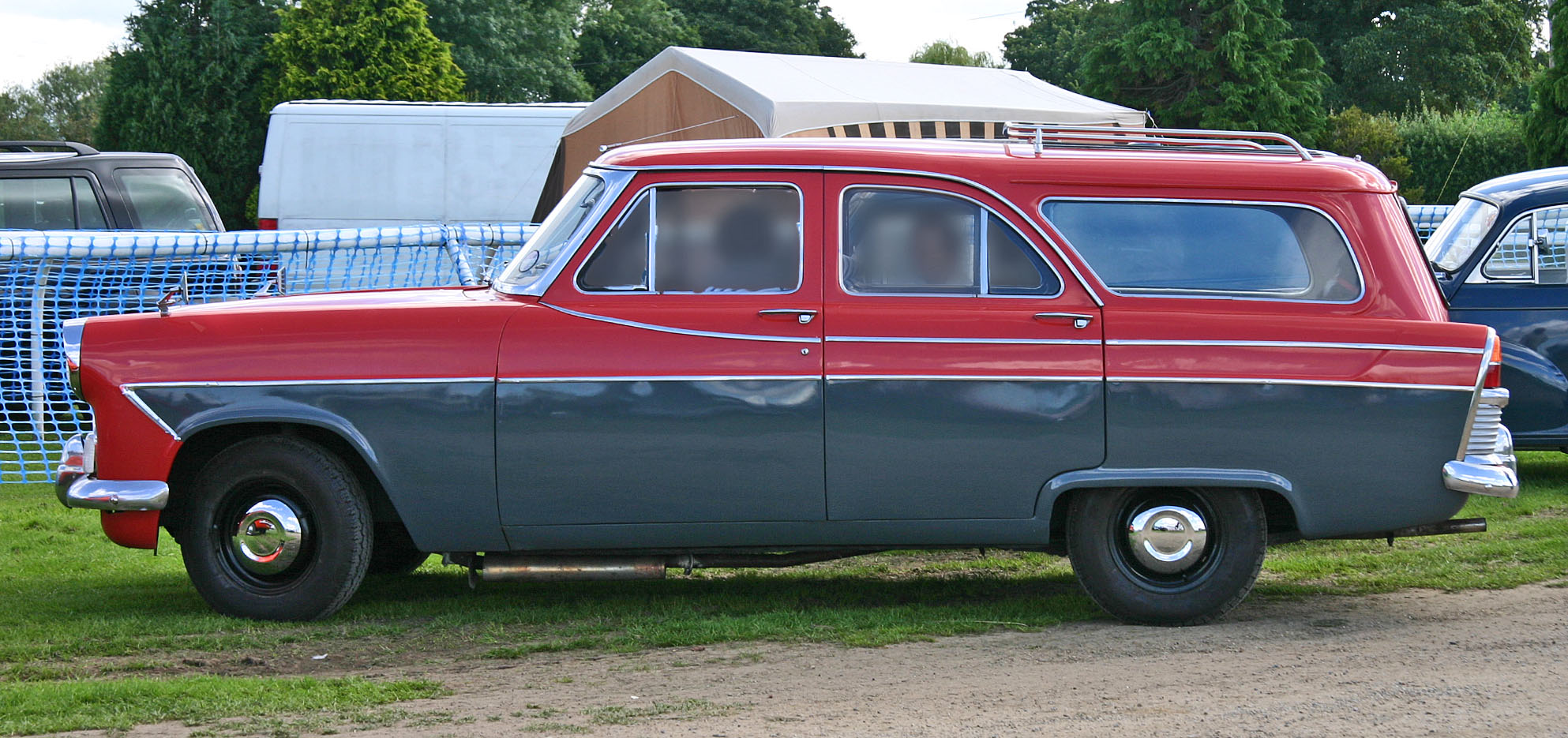

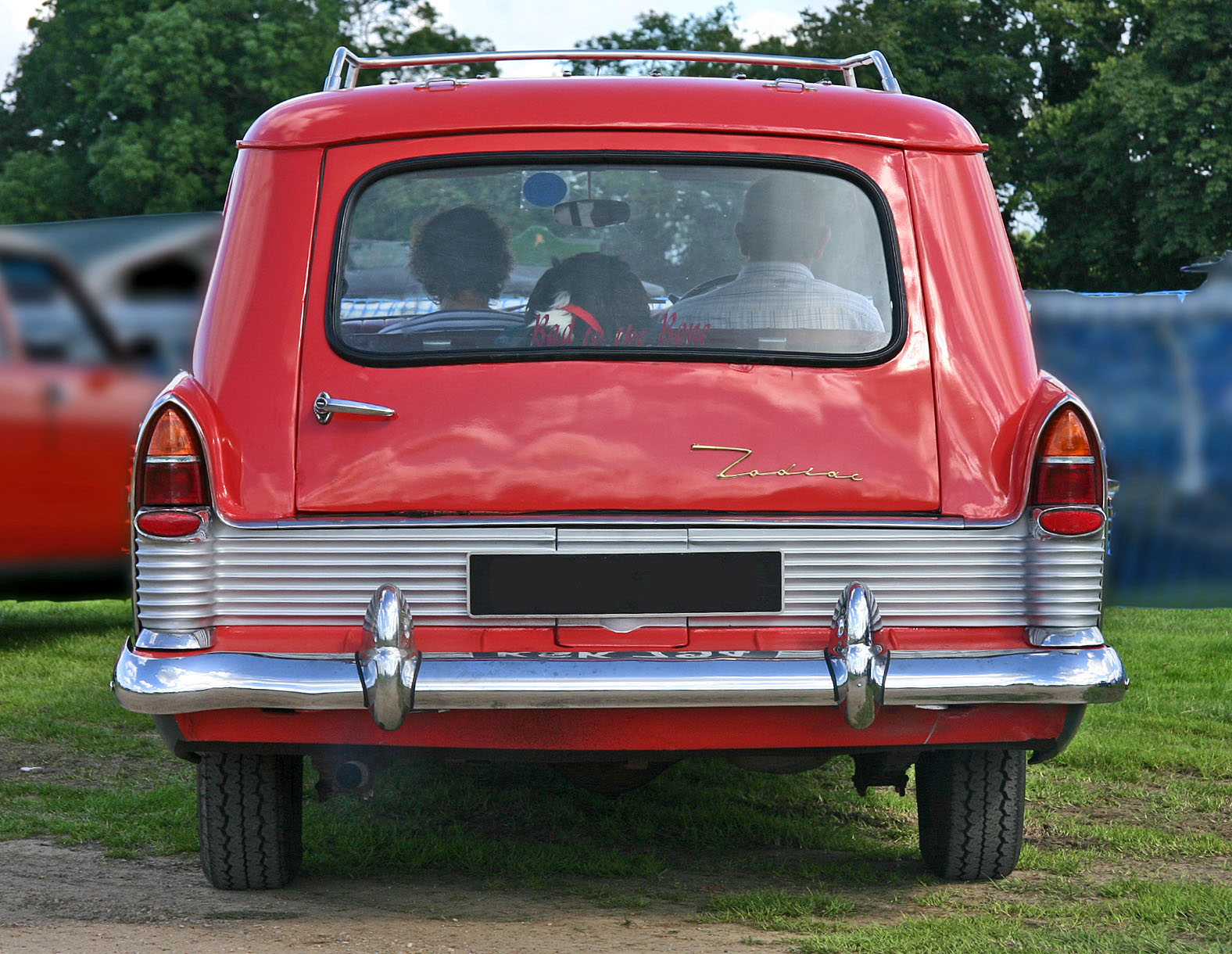

== Mark III ==
=== Zephyr 4 Mark III ===
Ford Zephyr 4 Mark III
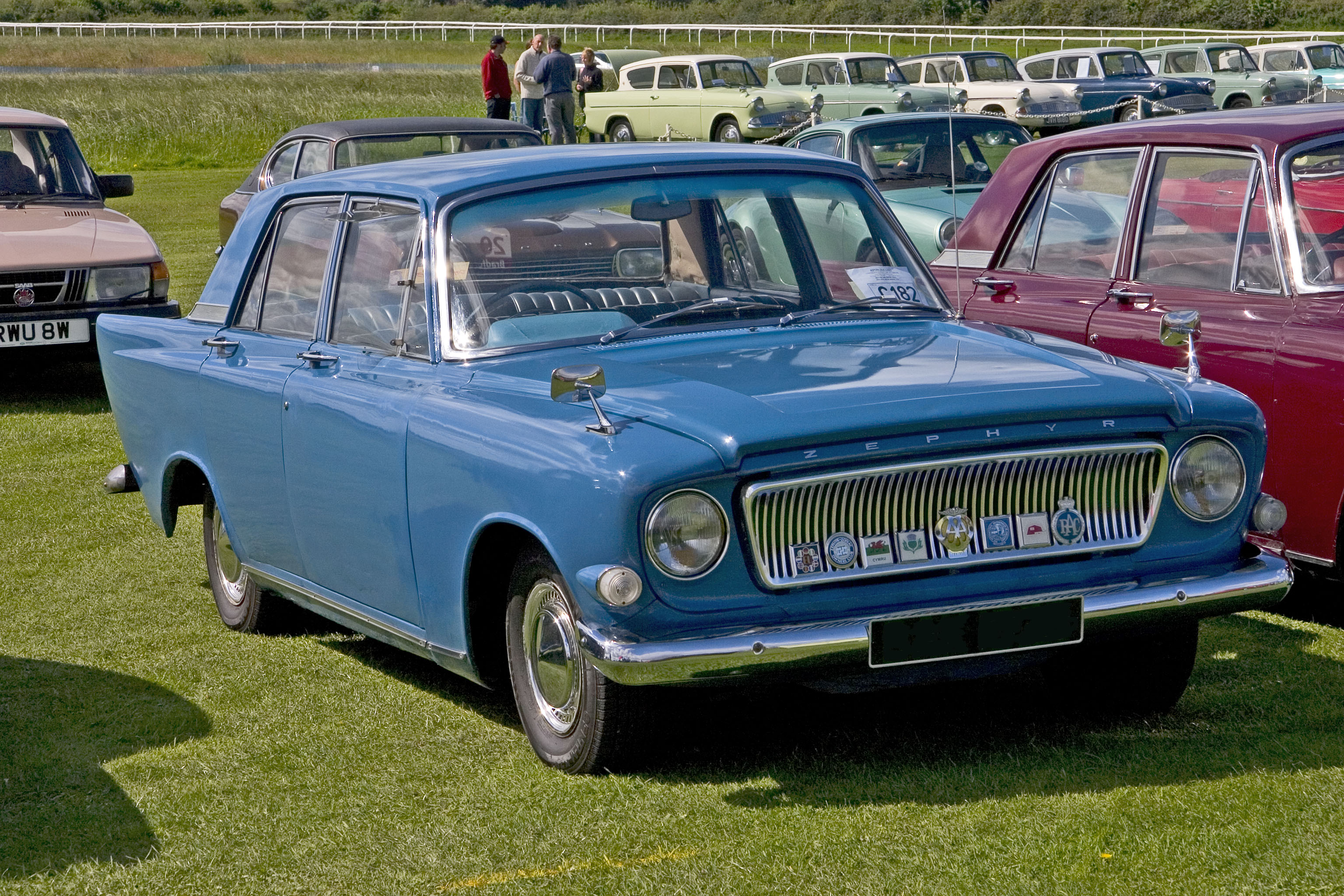

Overview
- Production: 1962–1966
- Designer: Roy Brown

Body and chassis
- Body style: 4-door saloon; 5-door estate (conversion)
- Related: Ford Zephyr 6 Mark III

Powertrain
- Engine: 1,703 cc (104 cu in) Zephyr straight-4

Dimensions
- Wheelbase: 107 in (2,718 mm)
- Length: 180.75 in (4,591 mm) (saloon and estate)
- Width: 69.25 in (1,759 mm)
- Height: 57.25 in (1,454 mm) (saloon); 57.75 in (1,467 mm) (estate)
- Curb weight: 2,576 lb (1,168 kg) (saloon); 2,912 lb (1,321 kg) (estate)

Model 211E

In April 1962, Ford replaced the Consul/Zephyr/Zodiac range with a dramatically restyled model, although it shared some of its mechanical components, as well as the basic chassis design, with the Mark II models. Rather than continue the Consul name, Ford UK decided to call its replacement Zephyr 4, the 4 indicating that it still used the four-cylinder 1,703 cc (104 cu in) engine from Consul 375. A four-speed manual gearbox, now with synchromesh on all ratios, was standard, with overdrive or automatic transmission available as options. Front disc brakes were standard. During the production run, the nose styling was changed and the grille lowered. The Zephyr lettering moved from the front edge of the bonnet to below the bonnet opening and the ‘4’ badge below the grille was eliminated.

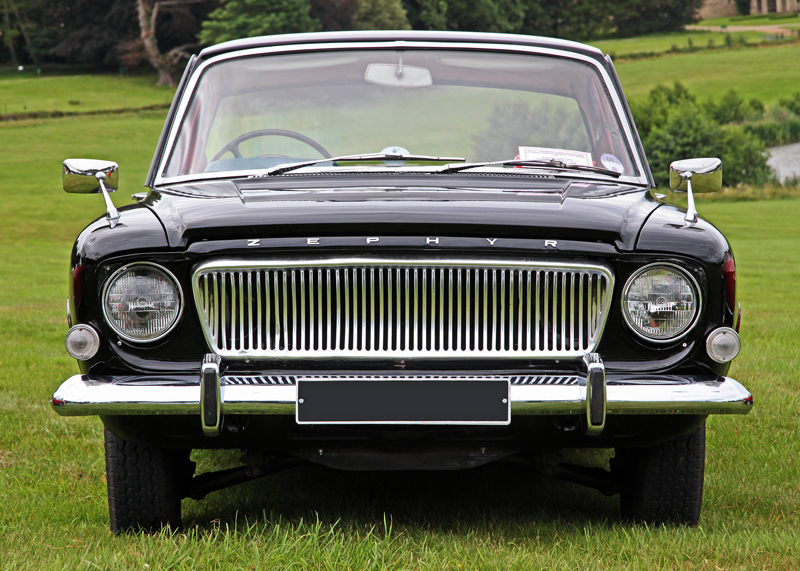
Zephyr 4

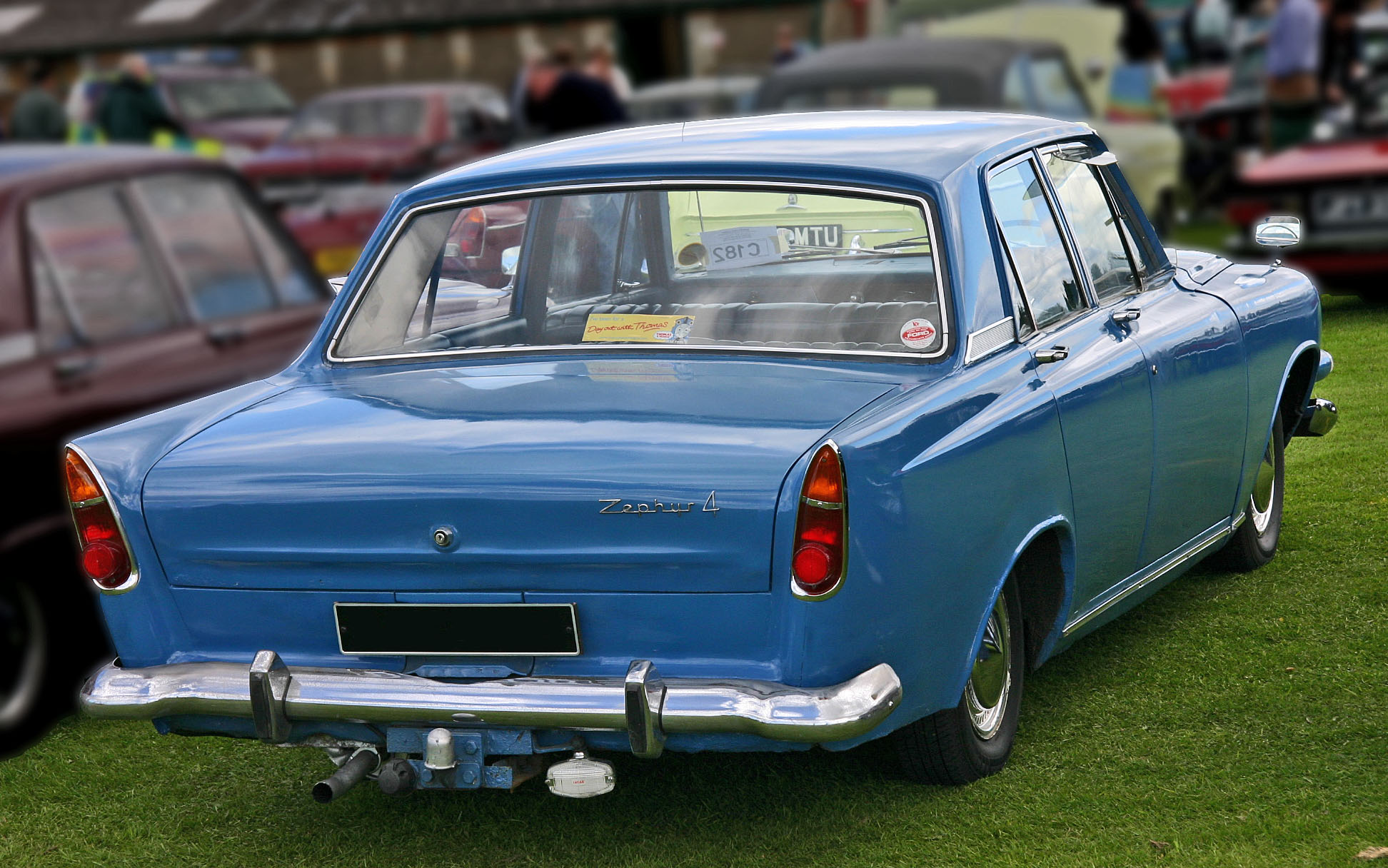

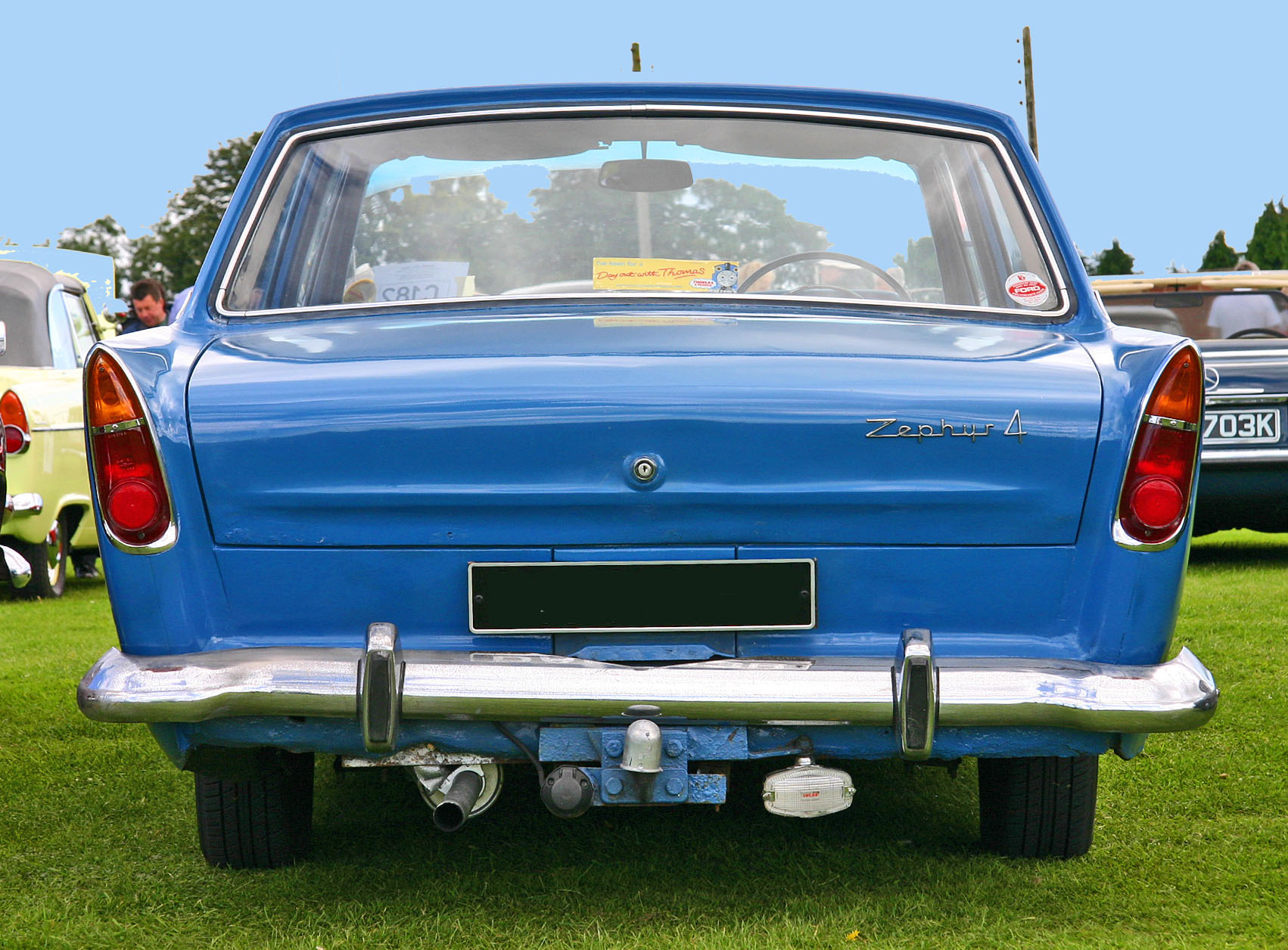

=== Zephyr 6 Mark III ===
Ford Zephyr 6 Mark III
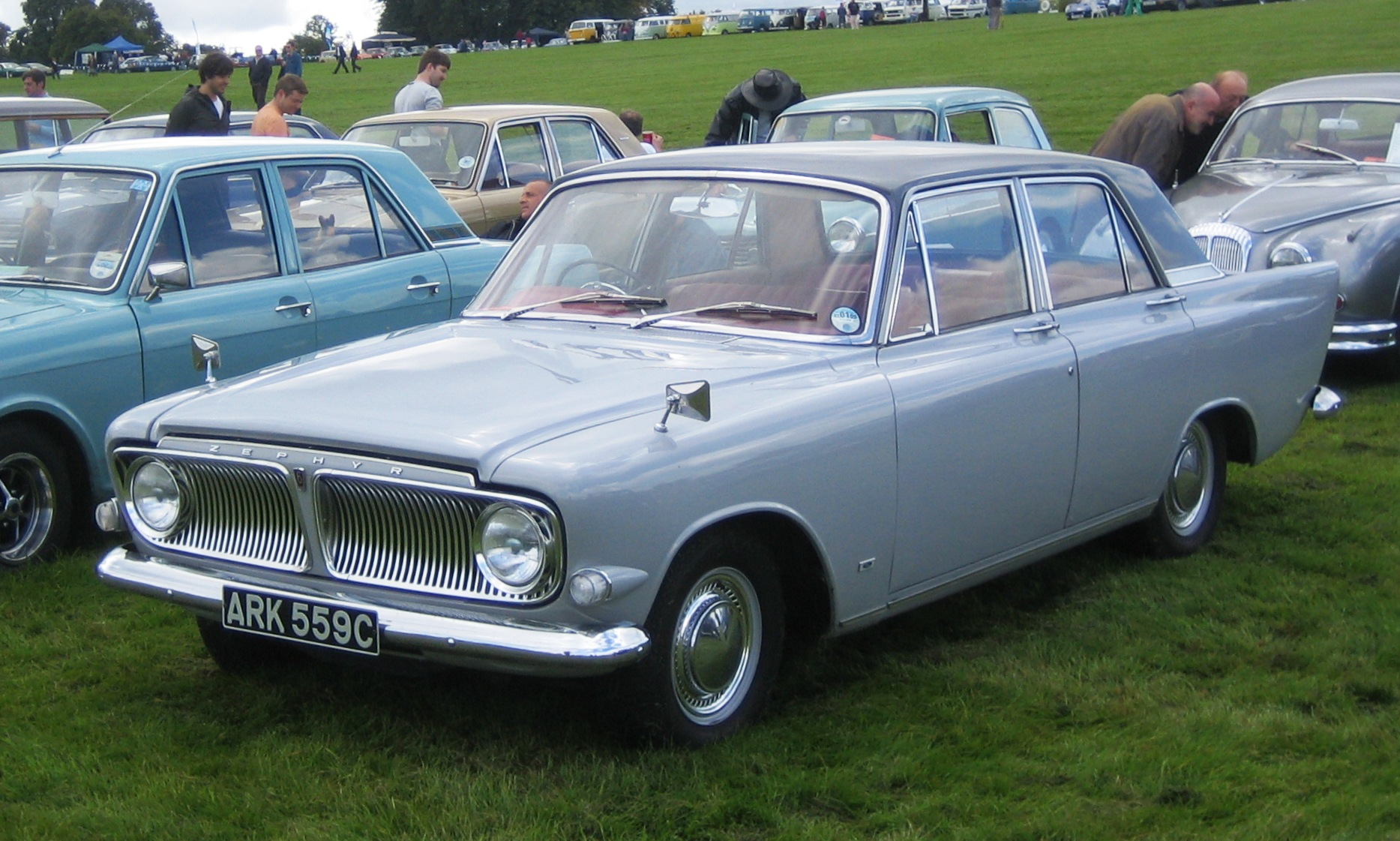

Overview
- Production: 1962–1966

Body and chassis
- Body style: 4-door saloon; 5-door estate (conversion)

Powertrain
- Engine: 2,553 cc (156 cu in) Zephyr ohv I6

Model numbers 213E, 214E (right- and left-hand drive)

The Zephyr Mark III shared some of its mechanical components, as well as the basic chassis design, with the Mark II, but had a stronger overall body construction. The exterior was designed by Canadian Roy Brown, who had also designed the Edsel and the Cortina, though the rear of the body was inspired by a design proposal by Frua. Unlike the Zephyr 4, the Zephyr 6 had a full-width grille including the headlight surrounds; overall body length and width were the same for both Zephyr III versions. With the same 2,553 cc (156 cu in) displacement as before, the Mark III model had higher compression ratio, resulting in some 20 hp (15 kW) higher output, as well as a broader torque range.

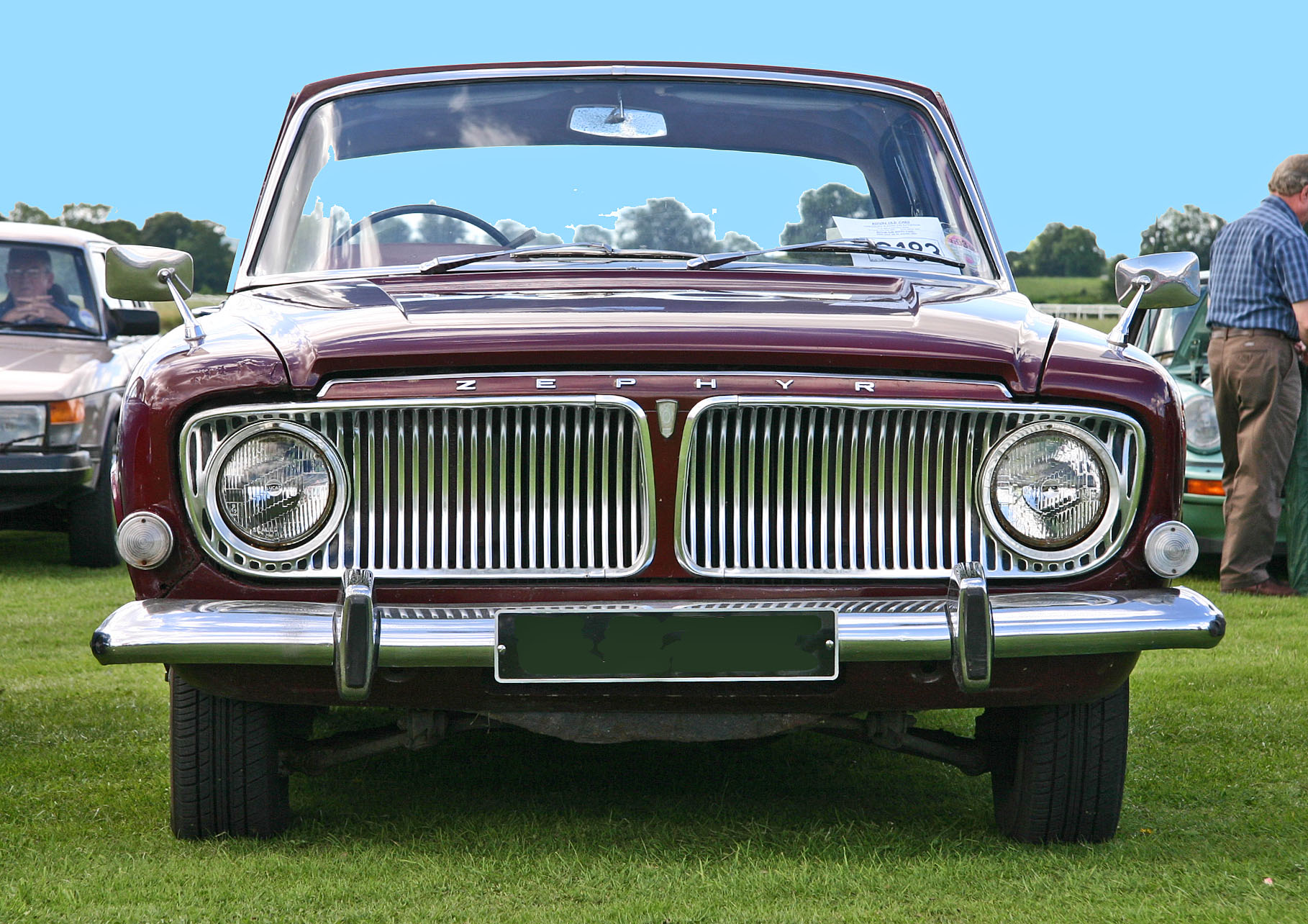
Ford Zephyr 6

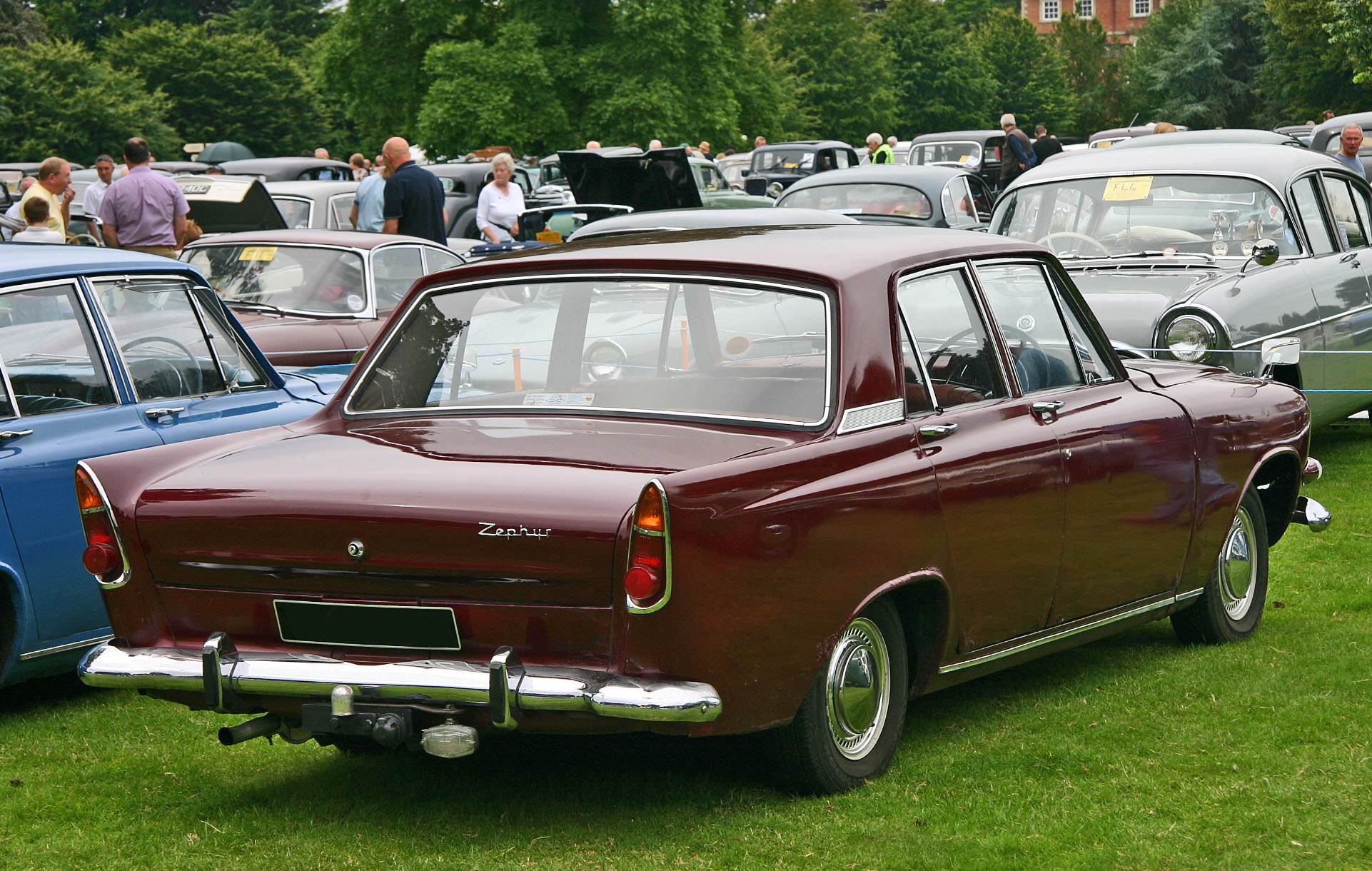

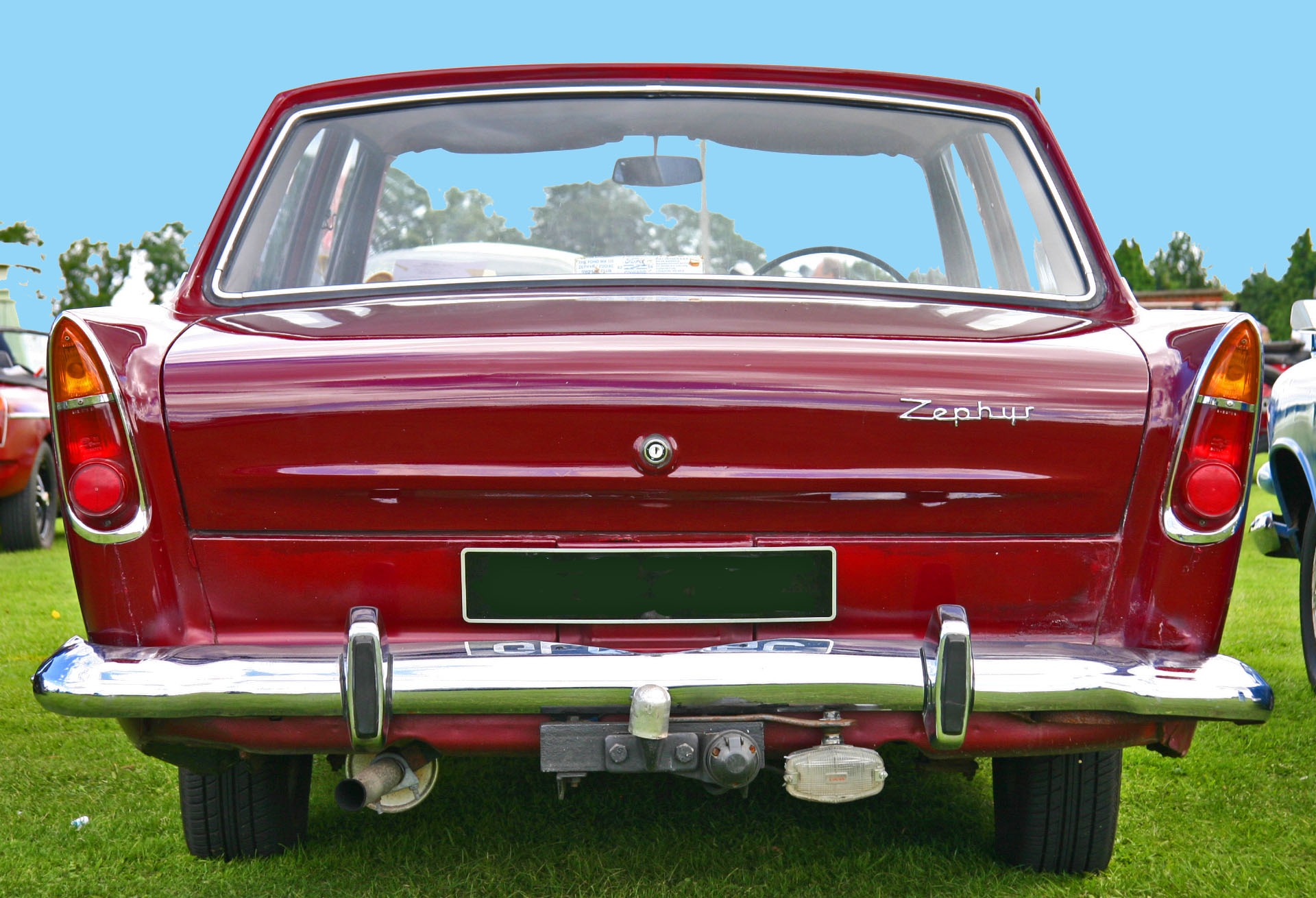

Only saloons and estate cars were made, the estate being a conversion by Abbotts of Farnham.

=== Abbott (Farnham) Estates ===
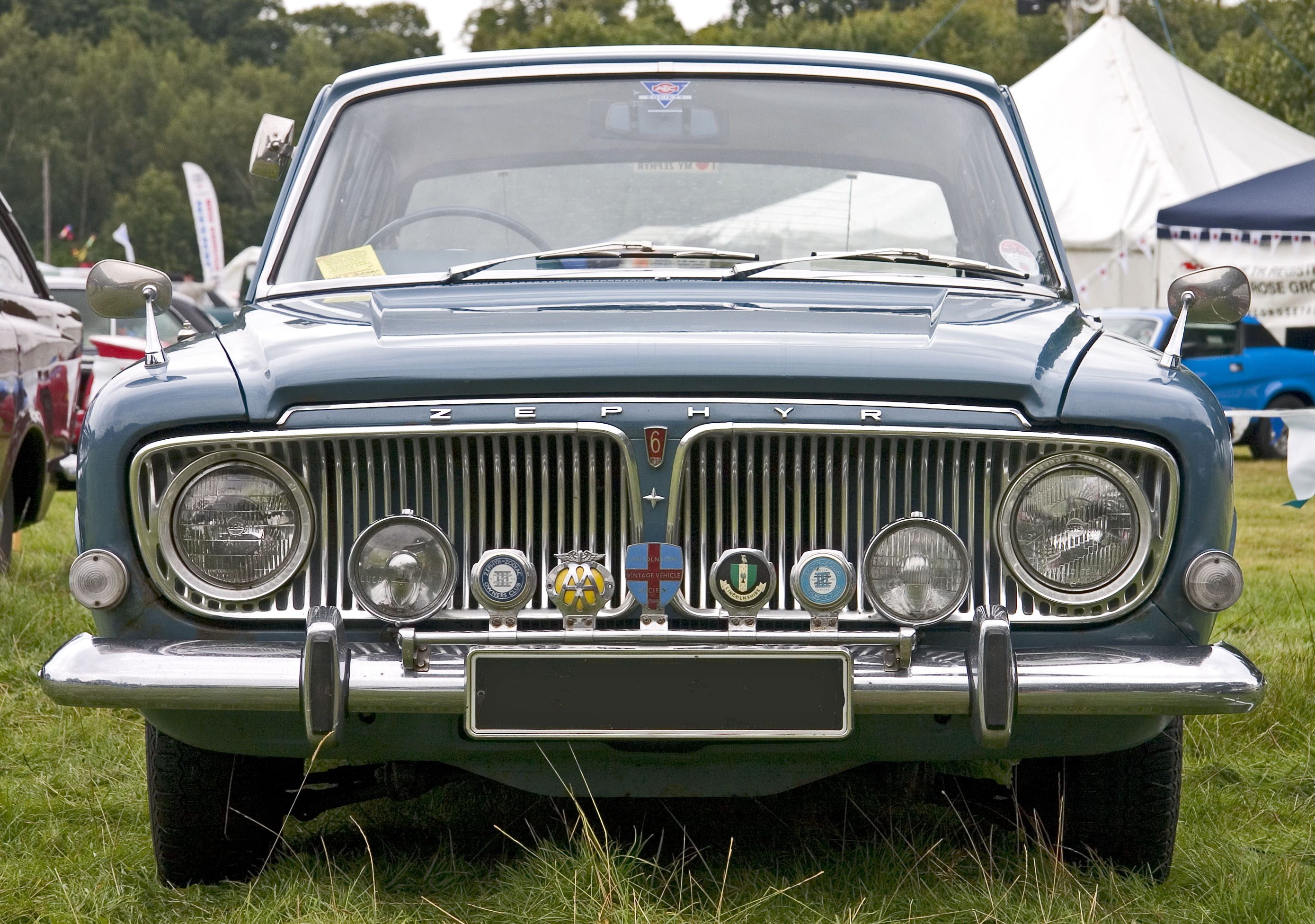
Zephyr 6 Abbott estate

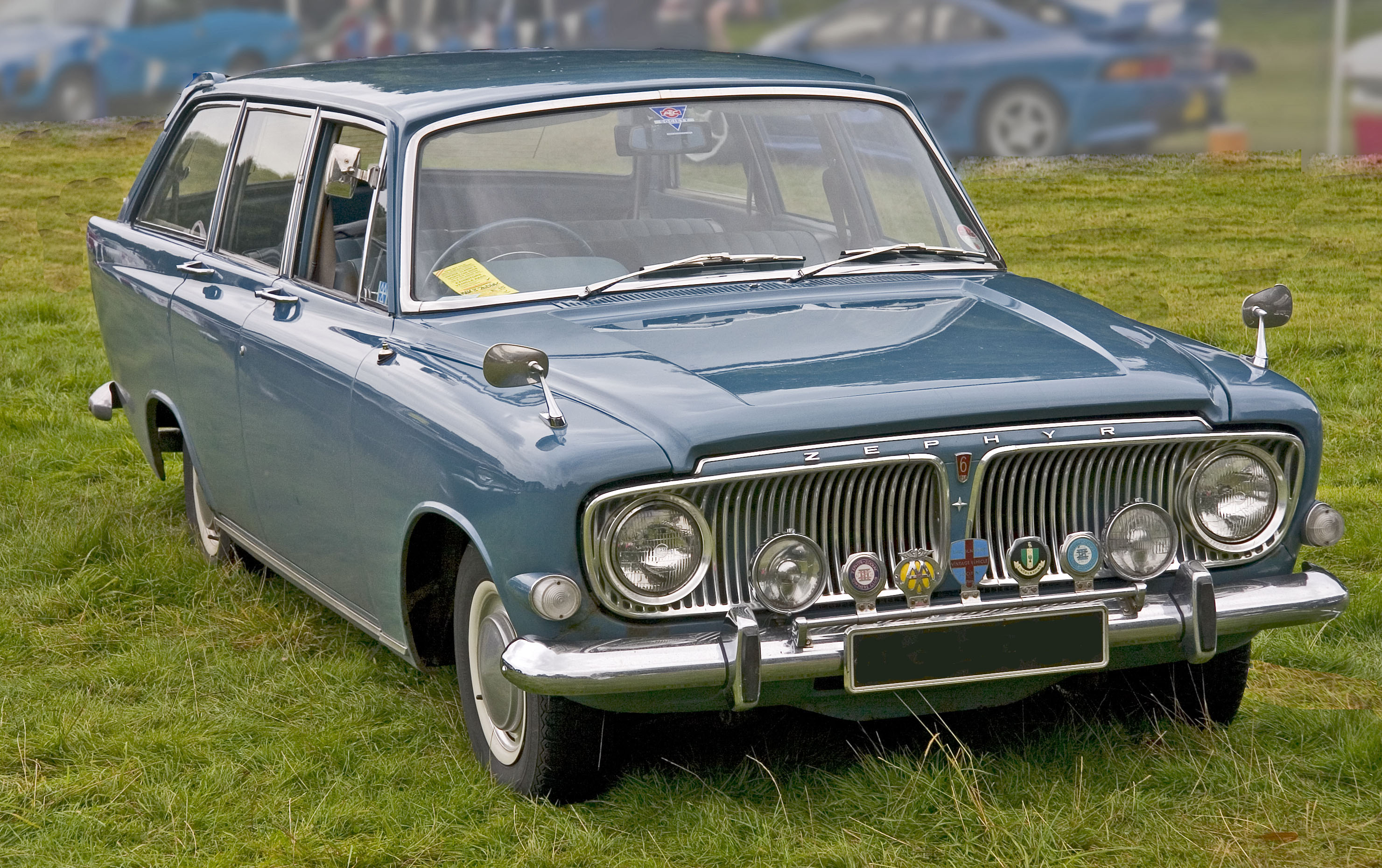

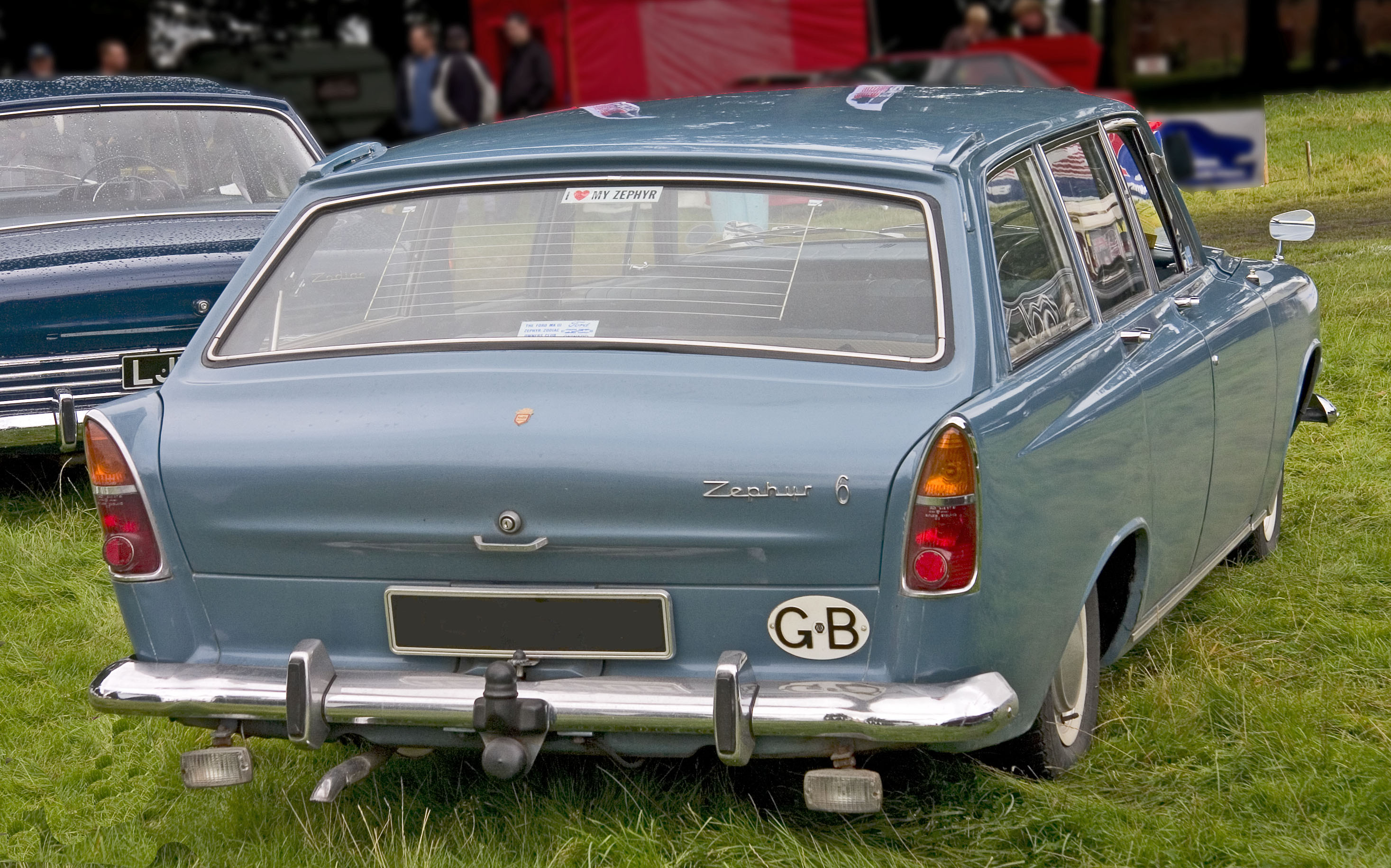

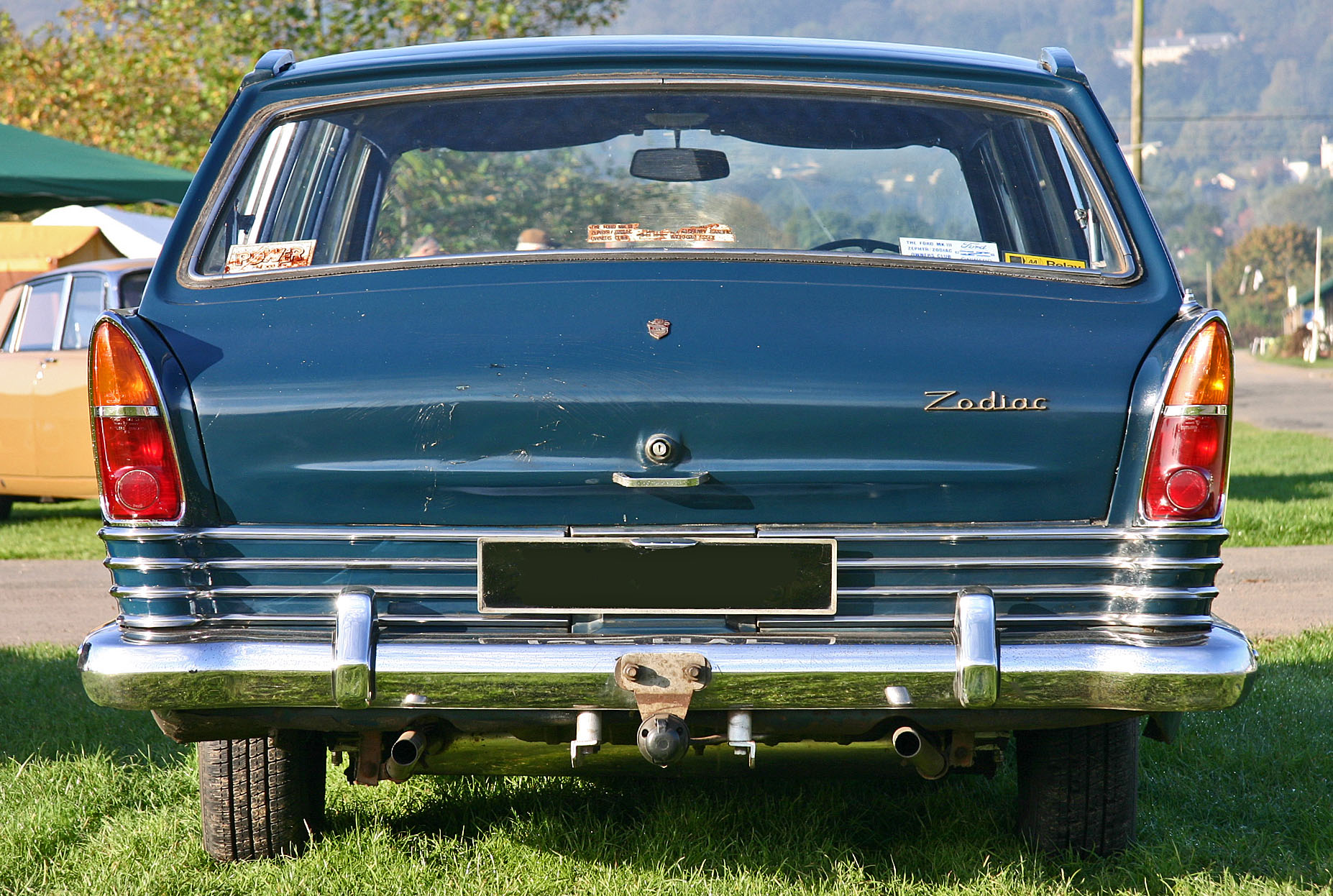
Rear view of Zodiac, for comparison

=== Zodiac Mark III ===
Ford Zodiac Mark III
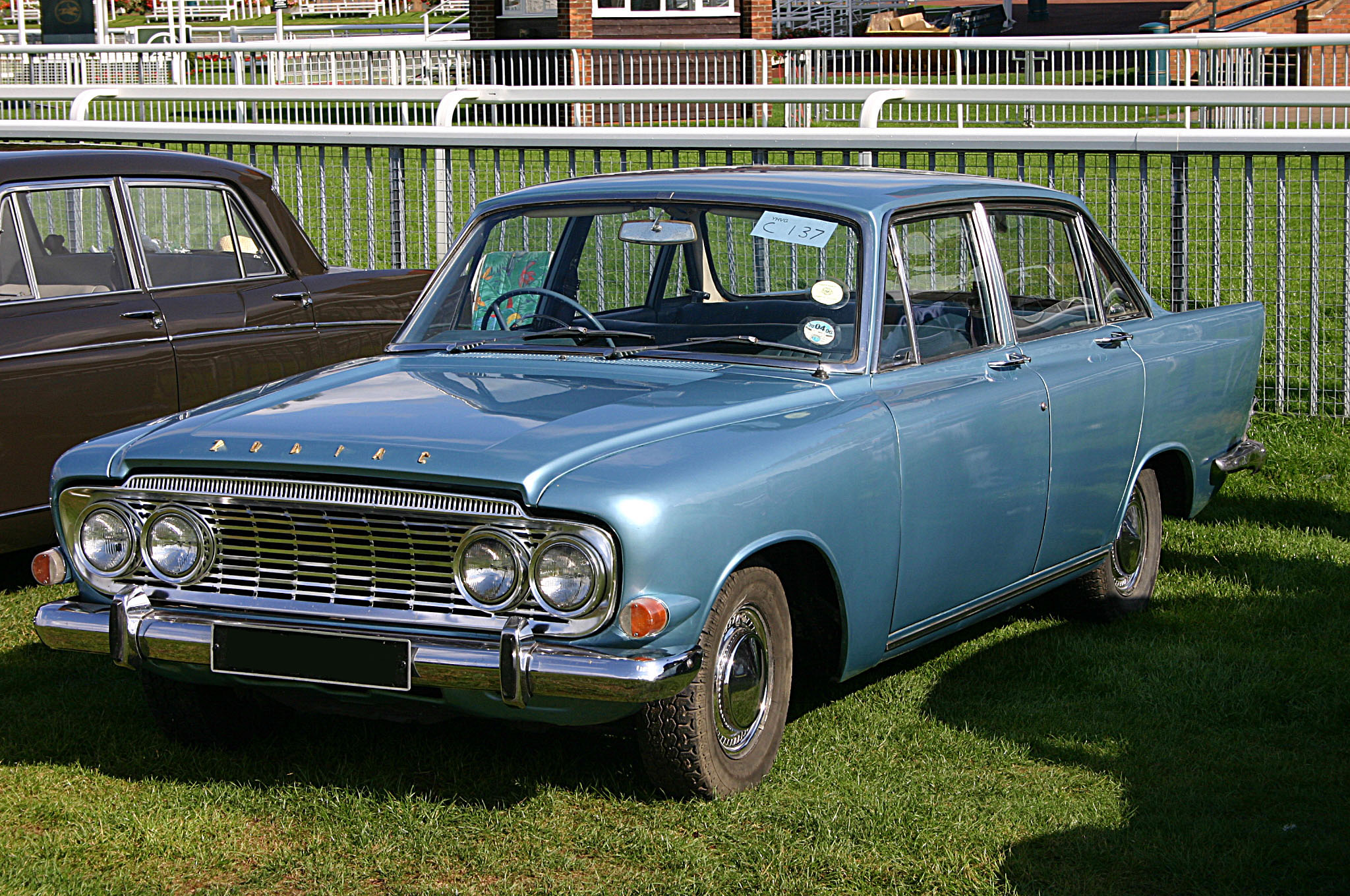
- Ford Zodiac Mark III saloon (213E)

Overview
- Production: 1962–1966

Body and chassis
- Body style: 4-door saloon; 5-door estate (conversion)

Powertrain
- Engine: 2,553 cc (156 cu in) Zephyr ohv I6

Dimensions
- Wheelbase: 107 in (2,718 mm)
- Length: 182.75 in (4,642 mm)
- Width: 69 in (1,753 mm)
- Height: 56.75 in (1,441 mm)
- Curb weight: 2,828 lb (1,283 kg)

Model numbers 213E, 214E

The Zodiac was an upmarket version of the Zephyr 6, but differed considerably from that model by the limousine-type rear doors, sharper roofline (with narrower C-pillar) and tail, unique grille (four headlights instead of two), exclusive bumper bars, plusher seating, and up-market upholstery, dashboard, and interior fittings. A choice of individual or bench front seats was available trimmed in leather or cloth. The front doors and bonnet panels were shared with the Zephyr 6. The Executive version had extra luxury fittings again. The 2553 cc, single-carburettor, six-cylinder engine was improved internally to increase the power output to 109 bhp and a new four-speed all synchromesh transmission with column change was fitted. The brakes, servo assisted, use discs at the front and drum at the rear.

A Mk III saloon tested by The Motor in 1962 had a top speed of 100.7 mph (162.1 km/h) and could accelerate from 0-60 mph (97 km/h) in 13.4 seconds. A touring fuel consumption of 22.6 miles per imperial gallon (12.5 L/100 km; 18.8 mpg_{‑US}) was recorded. The test car cost £1070 including taxes on the UK market.

Ford New Zealand initially built the Zephyr 4 and 6, as well as the Zodiac, locally from CKD kits, offering only the bench front seat option finished in vinyl. Automatic transmission, introduced late in the life of the Mk II, was again available, but were a rare factory option, as most buyers chose manual. As well as the Zephyr 6, Ford NZ built a six-cylinder Zephyr Special (which replaced the 4) with a lower equipment level and deletion of the central vertical grille bar, boot lid trim strip, and other exterior brightwork, which was sold to fleet operators such as the government. The big Fords were unusual in having four-speed manual gearboxes when rivals, including Ford's own Falcon, had only three-speed ones. Building the top luxury Zodiac model locally also gave Ford a supply advantage over key rivals such as GM's Vauxhall, whose upmarket Cresta was not assembled locally after 1960, and once available only as a fully imported model, was much harder to obtain than the locally assembled Velox.

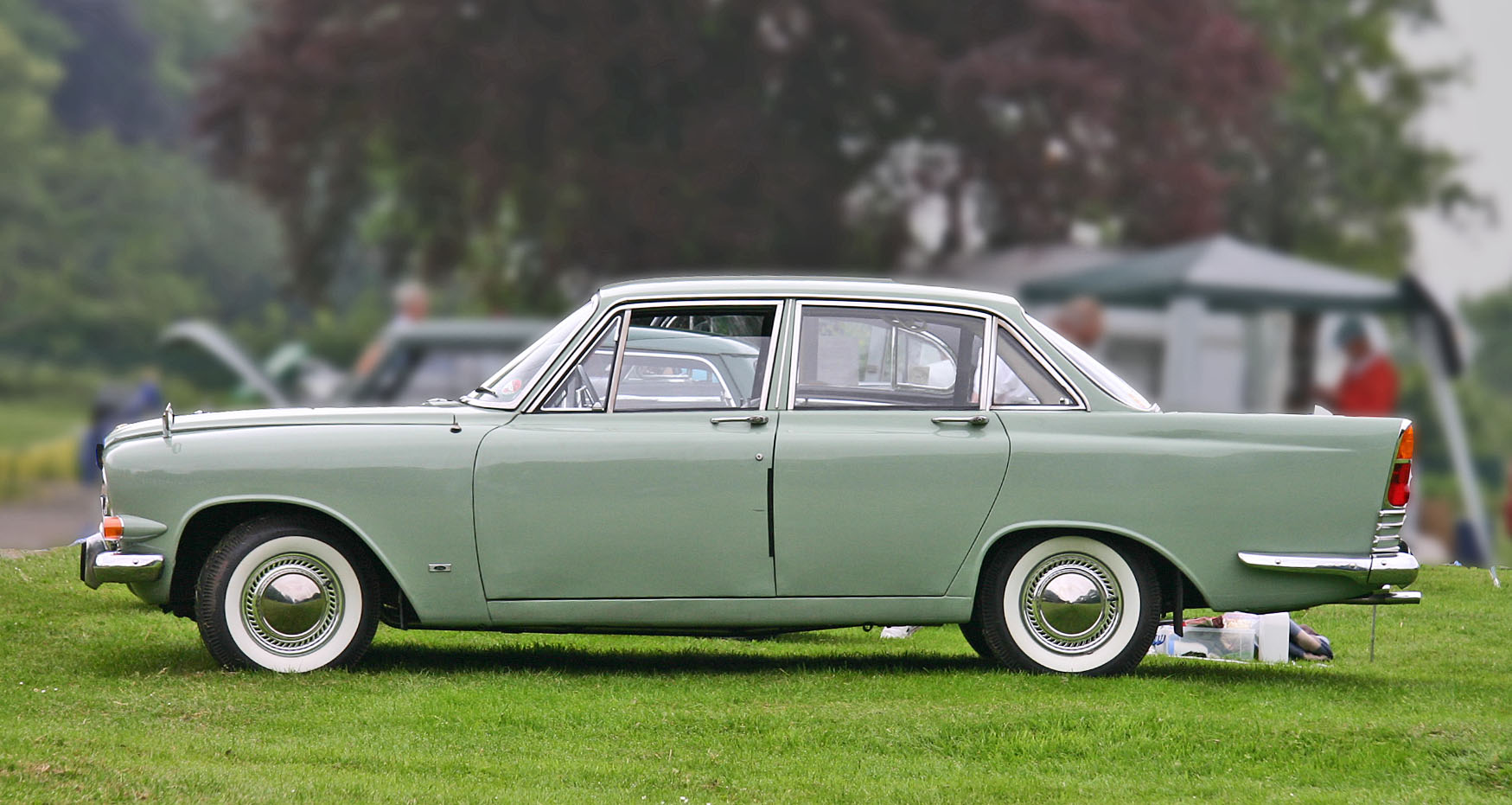
Ford Zodiac Mark III (213E)

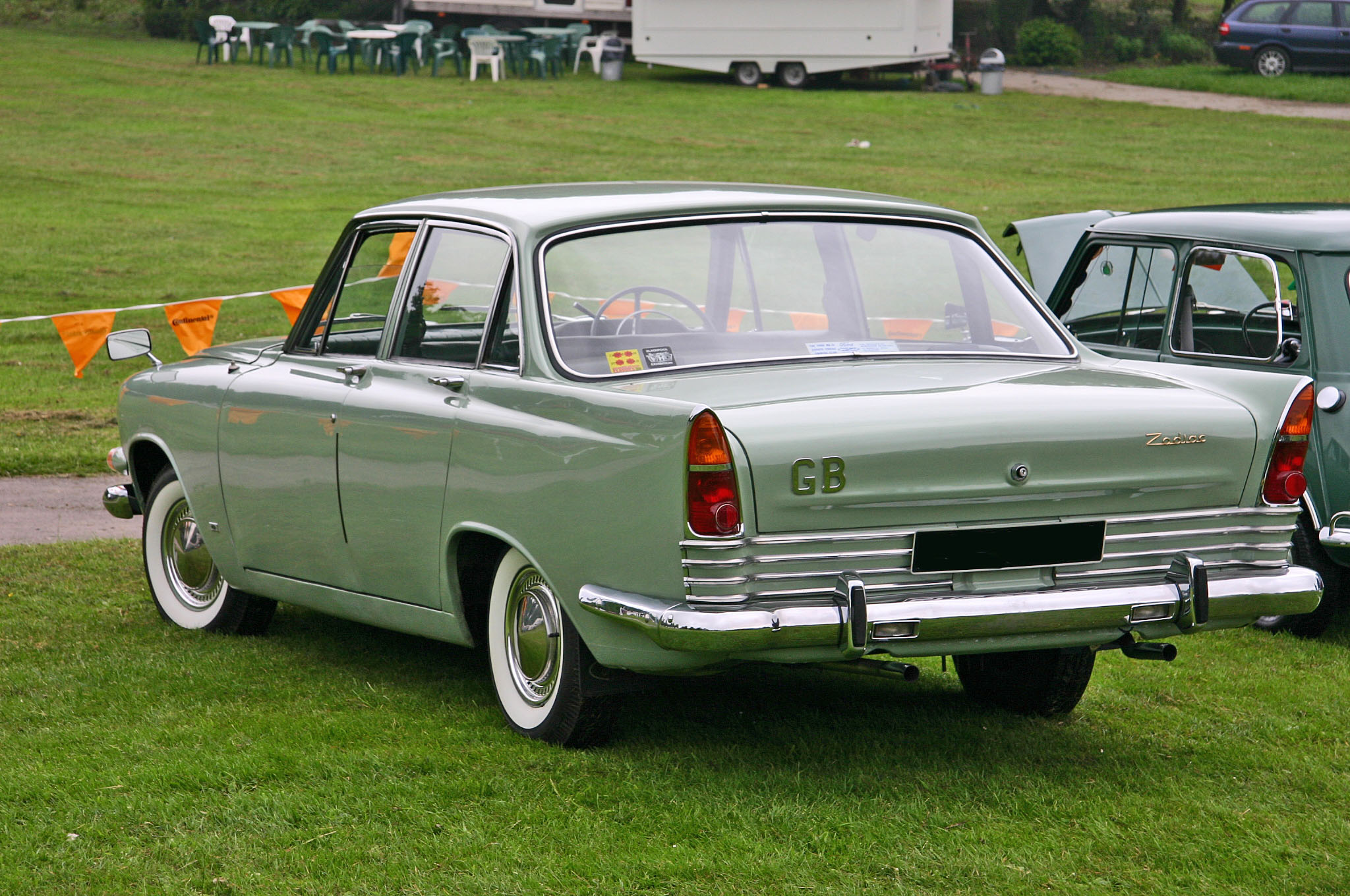

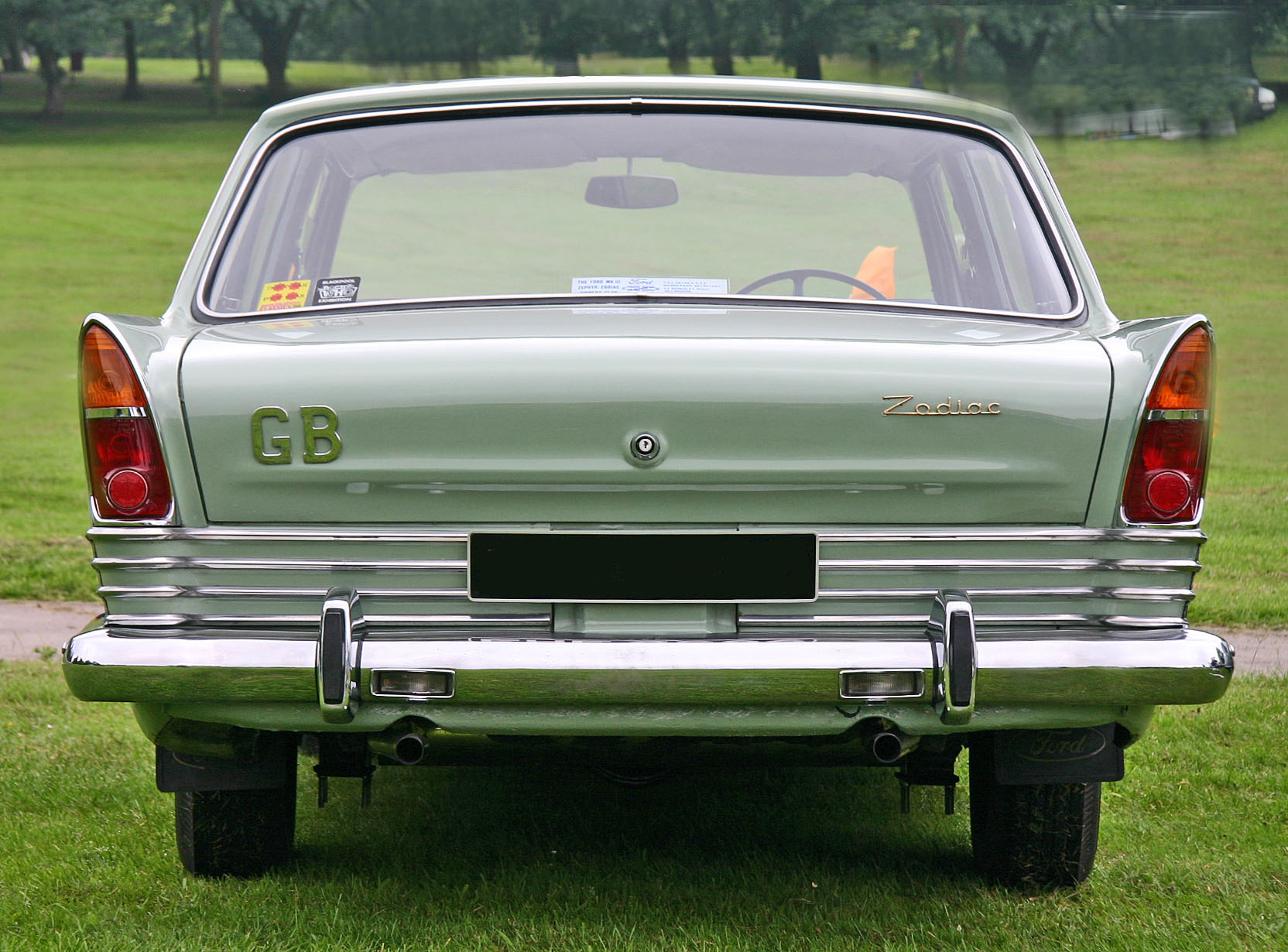

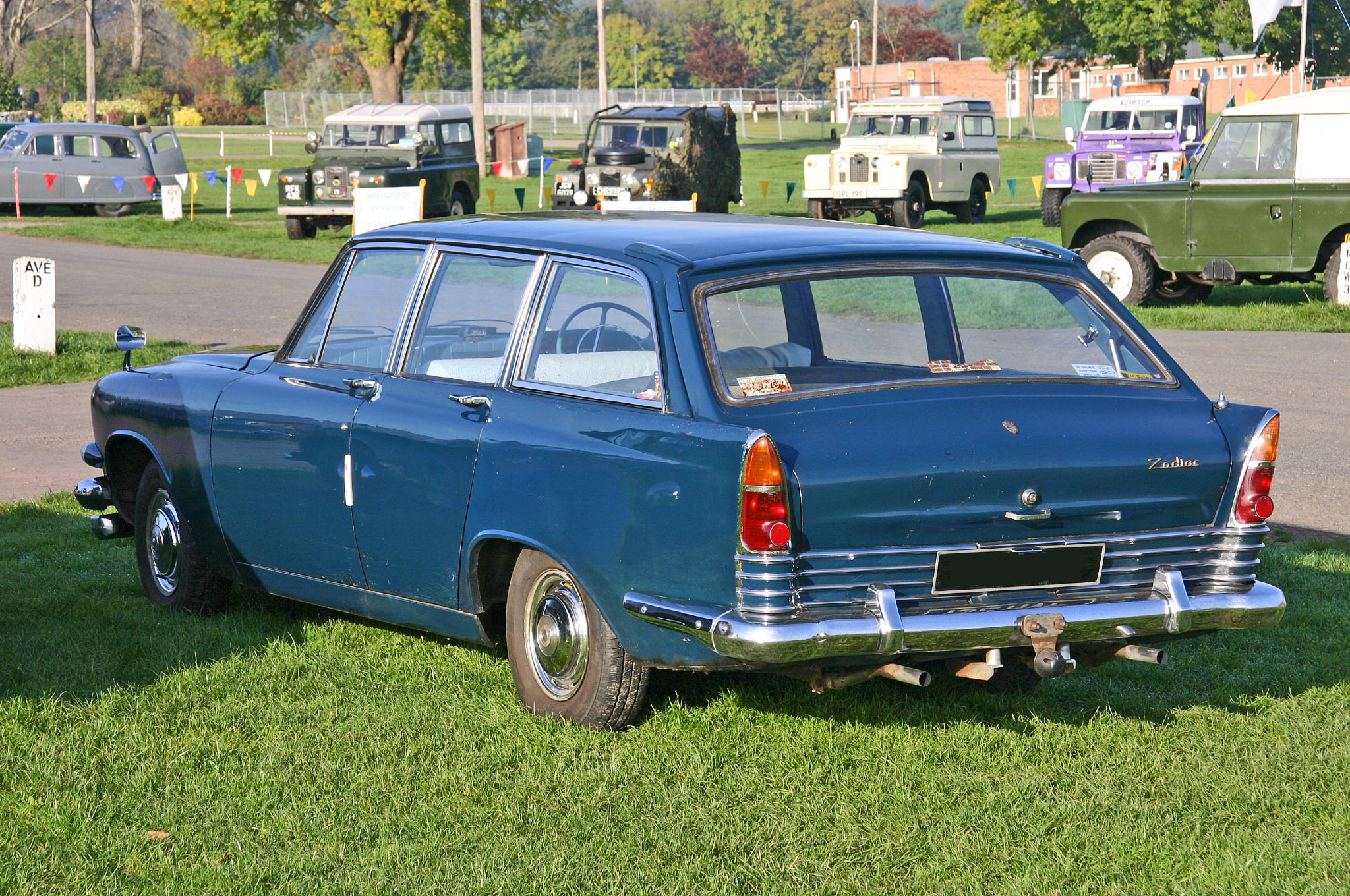
Ford Zodiac Mark III Estate (213E)

== Mark IV ==
=== Zephyr Mark IV ===
Ford Zephyr Mark IV
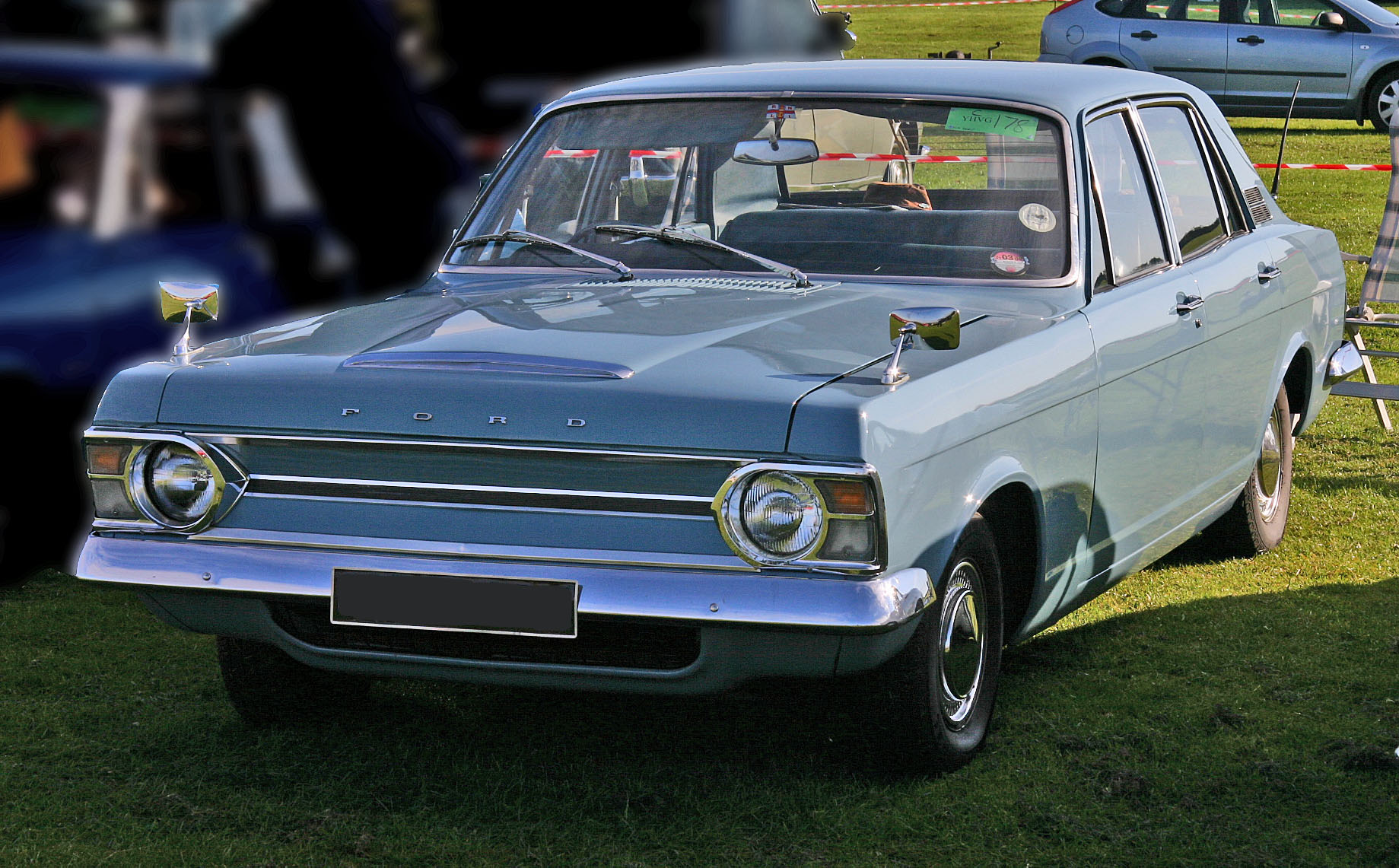

Overview
- Production: 1966–1972

Body and chassis
- Body style: 4-door saloon; 5-door estate (conversion)

Powertrain
- Engine: 1,996 cc (121.8 cu in) Essex V4; 2,495 cc (152.3 cu in) Essex V6
- Transmission: 4-speed manual; 3-speed Ford C4 automatic

Dimensions
- Wheelbase: 115 in (2,921 mm)
- Length: 185 in (4,699 mm)
- Width: 71.25 in (1,810 mm)
- Height: 58.5 in (1,486 mm)
- Curb weight: 2,716 lb (1,232 kg) (Zephyr 4); 2,884 lb (1,308 kg) (Zephyr 6)

Models 3008 / 3010E

In 1961, Ford began a complete redesign on the Zephyr, under the title of "Project Panda". As the car used the new V-series engines, the then traditional long bonnet concept created a problem until design engineer Harley Copp required that the car was both larger and had more internal space, and came up with the idea of placing the spare wheel ahead of the radiator on an angle. The result was a vehicle of similar dimensions to the North American Ford Fairlane.

The Mk IV range was launched, not at an October motor show, but in early 1966 with new V-format engines, the 4 having a 1,996 cc (122 cu in) V4 and the 2,495 cc (152 cu in) V6 unit. The independent suspension was aided by servo-assisted disc brakes on all wheels.

Criticism of the handling of early examples in the UK led to the fitting as standard of radial-ply tyres on the larger-engined version in place of the more conventional (in the UK at that time) cross-ply tyres with which all versions were fitted at the 1966 launch, and the retrofitting of radial-ply tyres to early examples addressed the tendency of the rear wheels to slide uncontrollably in wet weather, justifying in the process Ford's investment in a new and relatively sophisticated rear suspension arrangement for the Mark IVs. Even after that, a contemporary nevertheless opined that the ride involved a certain amount of 'float', and reported that the nose-heavy handling called for a 'strong driver', a problem which the more expensive Zodiac and Executive versions mitigated through the fitting as a standard feature of power assisted steering. Cost constraints precluded adding power assisted steering for the Zephyr, but during its production run the steering ratio was lowered which reduced the strength needed to change direction by increasing the number of turns between locks from 5.5 to an even higher 6.4. Another production modification for the 4-cylinder Zephyr involved redesigning the valve gear in order to eliminate the need on the early Mk IVs for frequent tappet adjustments.

The size of the bonnet was emphasized by square-cut styling of the wings. A practical use was found for some of the extra space in front of the driver; the spare wheel was stored, ahead of the engine, under the bonnet, freeing up space at the other end of the car for more luggage.

Although large, the car, at least in its Zephyr form, was not particularly luxurious. Individual front seats were available at extra cost, but the standard front bench seat was described by one commentator who ran the car on a long-term test as being intended for people no taller than 5 feet 8 inches (1.73 m) who have the right leg 3 inches (7.6 cm) shorter than the left.

An estate version of the Zephyr Mark IV was announced just in time for the London Motor Show in October 1966, though deliveries commenced only in January 1967. As with the earlier Zephyrs, volumes did not justify tooling up for estate production at the Dagenham plant, and the cars were instead built by E. D. Abbott Ltd of Farnham, based on part finished saloons received from Ford. The Mark IV Zephyr estates (like their more expensive Zodiac siblings) came with black vinyl-covered roof, a fashionable distinguishing feature of upmarket vehicles at the time: retention unchanged of the saloon's rear light clusters attracted criticism, however, because of the way it narrowed the rear hatch opening at floor level when compared to the arrangements on the cheaper Ford Cortina estates.

==== Export models ====
In November 1966, the manufacturers announced a plan to introduce an "export special" version of the Zephyr Mk IV combining the 3.0-L engine of the Zodiac with other specifications largely following those of the existing Zephyr. This 3.0-L Zephyr was not offered by Ford on the domestic (UK) market.

This 3.0-litre model was quickly adopted by Ford New Zealand, which had originally launched the Mk IV Zephyr assembled locally from CKD kits with the 2.5-litre V6 (no Zephyr 4 this time) and received complaints it was underpowered for a country where towing boats and caravans was common. Ford New Zealand also introduced optional floor gear shift and bucket seats as an alternative to the standard column shift and bench front seat, and a large number of Zephyrs were built in this form, with other modifications, for New Zealand's traffic police.

The Zodiac was also again assembled in New Zealand with both bench and bucket front seats and Zodiacs from about 1967 also had the walnut dashboard from the U.K. market Executive. An automatic transmission was optional with both the Zephyr and Zodiac. The local Mark IV line did not include the Zephyr Deluxe version available in the UK, was not as popular as the Mark III, and was outsold by the now much wider, locally built Australian Falcon range. Production ended in 1972, and the Consul and Granada replacements introduced in the UK were never officially imported into New Zealand.

South African Zephyrs and Zodiacs all received the 3.0-litre "Export" engine beginning with the 1968 model year. This also included replacing the earlier Zephyr Super with the new Zephyr de luxe, which received the dummy grille as on European cars.

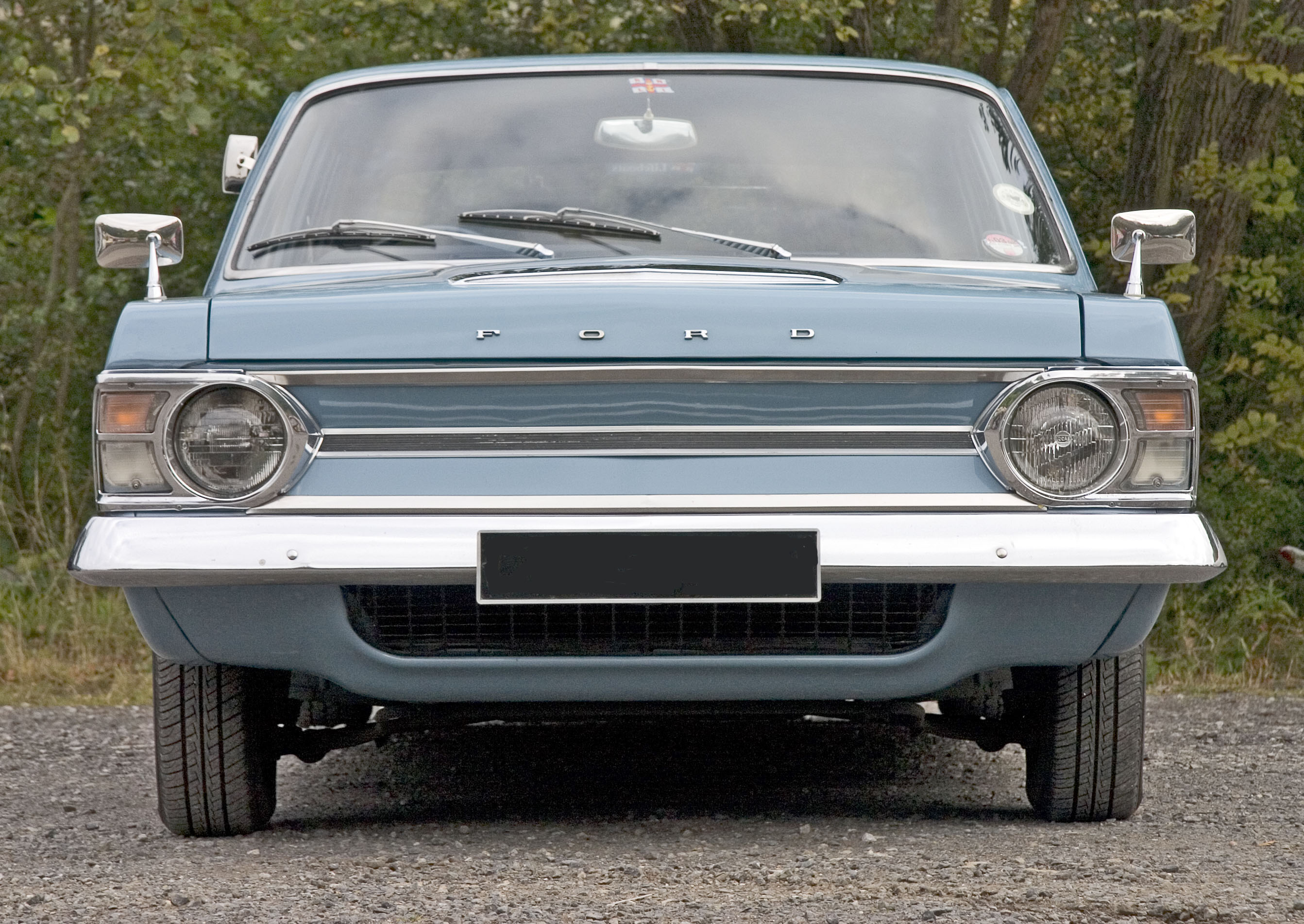
Ford Zephyr 4 Mark IV

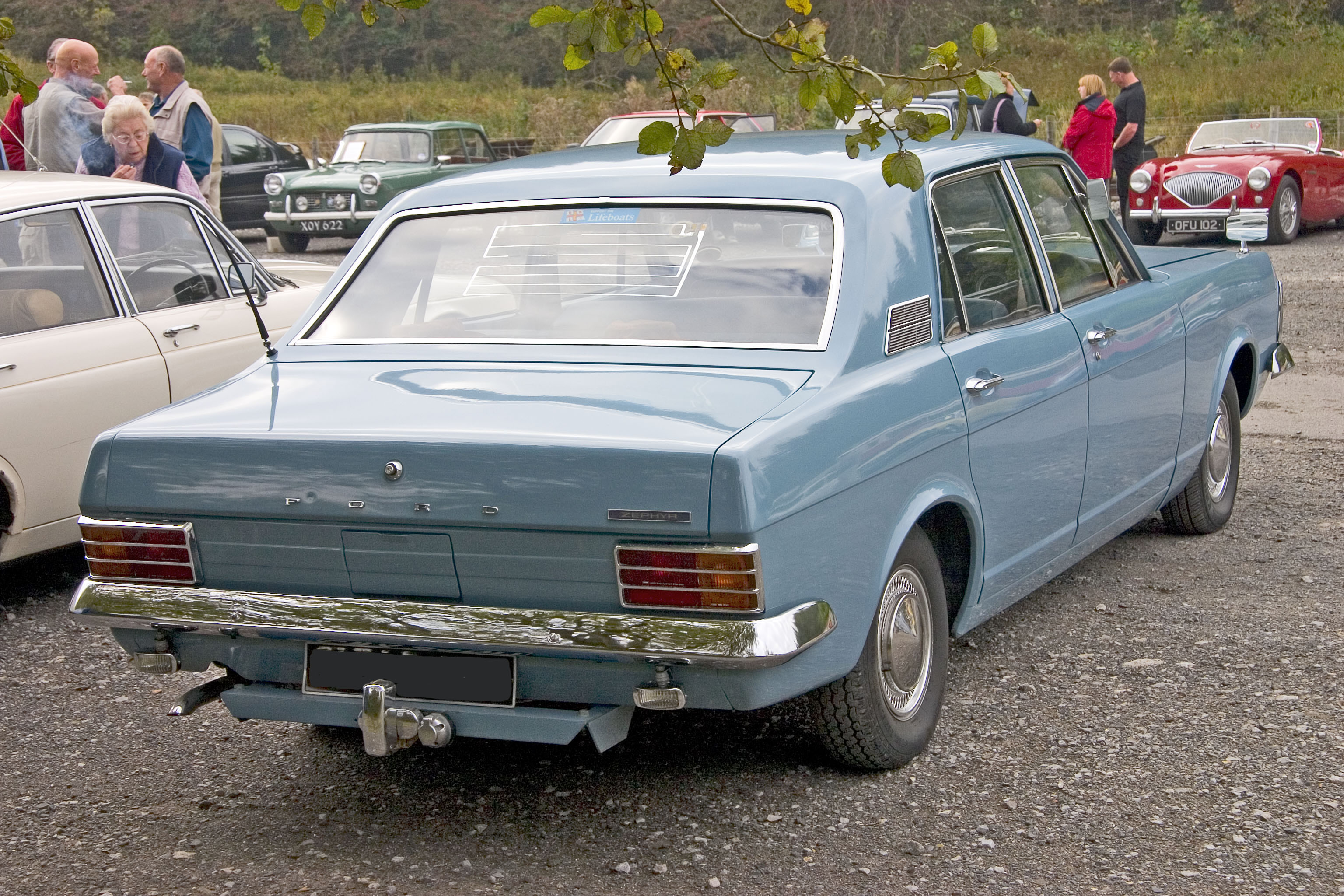

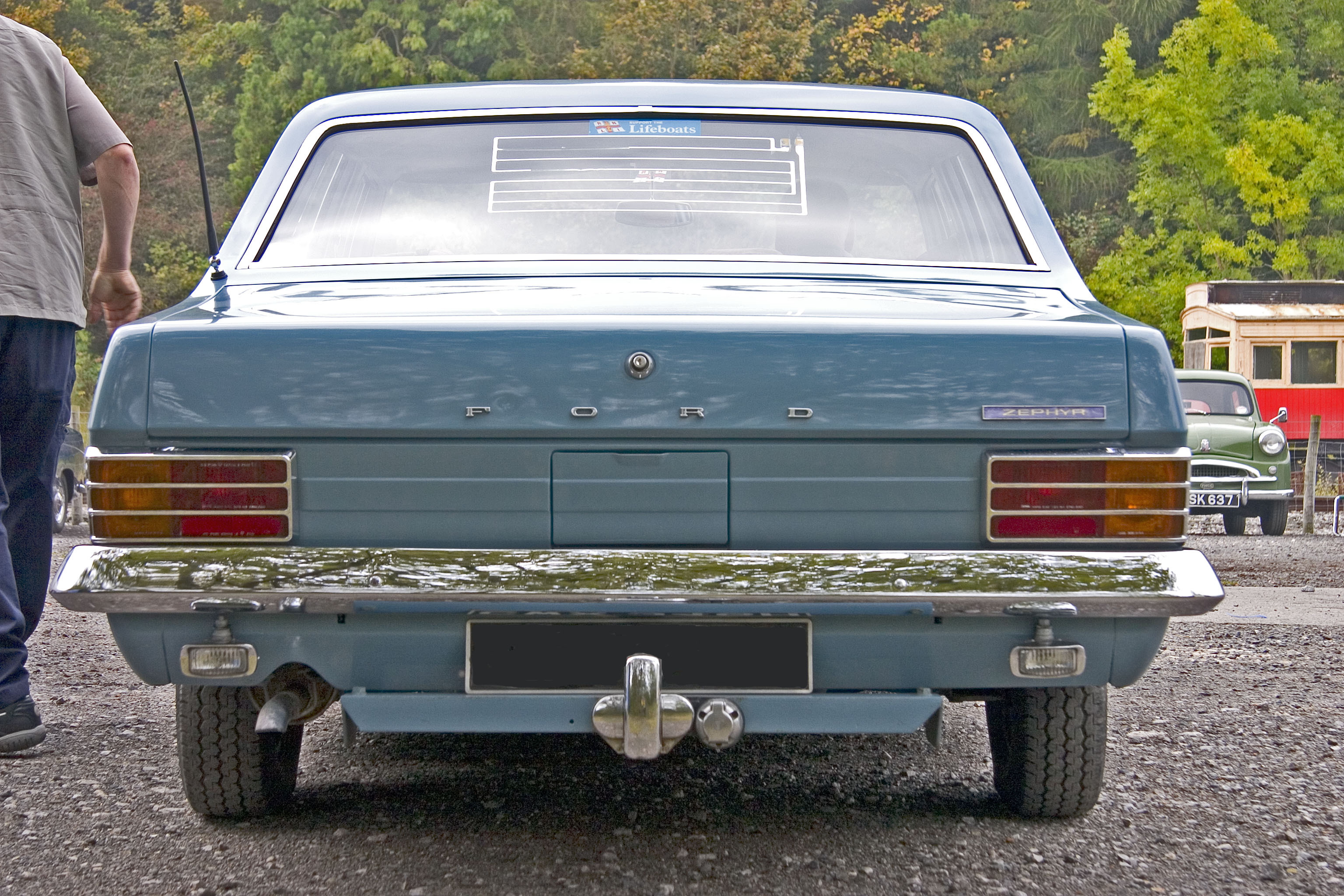
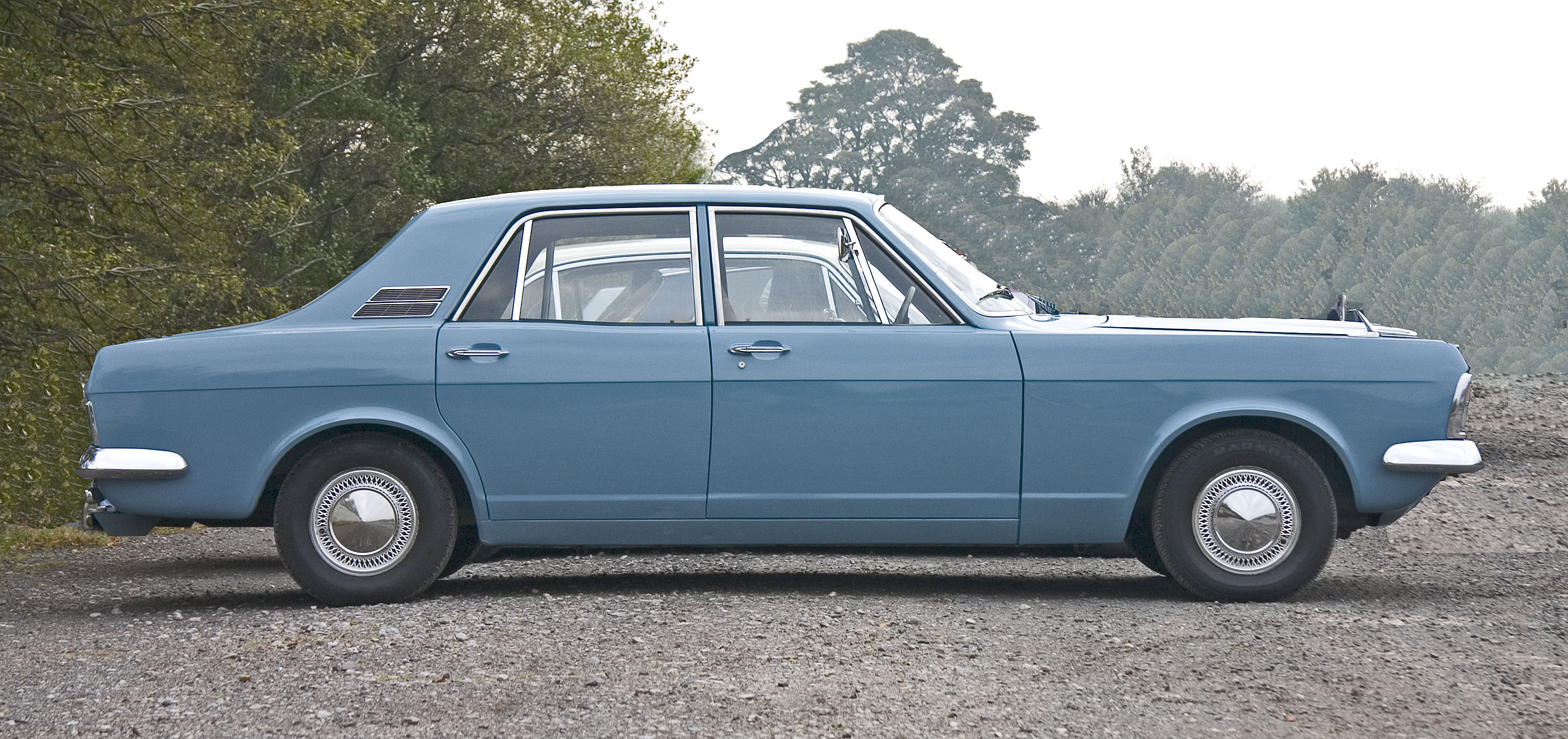
Ford Zephyr 4 Mark IV: the short tailed long nosed profile recalled Ford's iconic Mustang

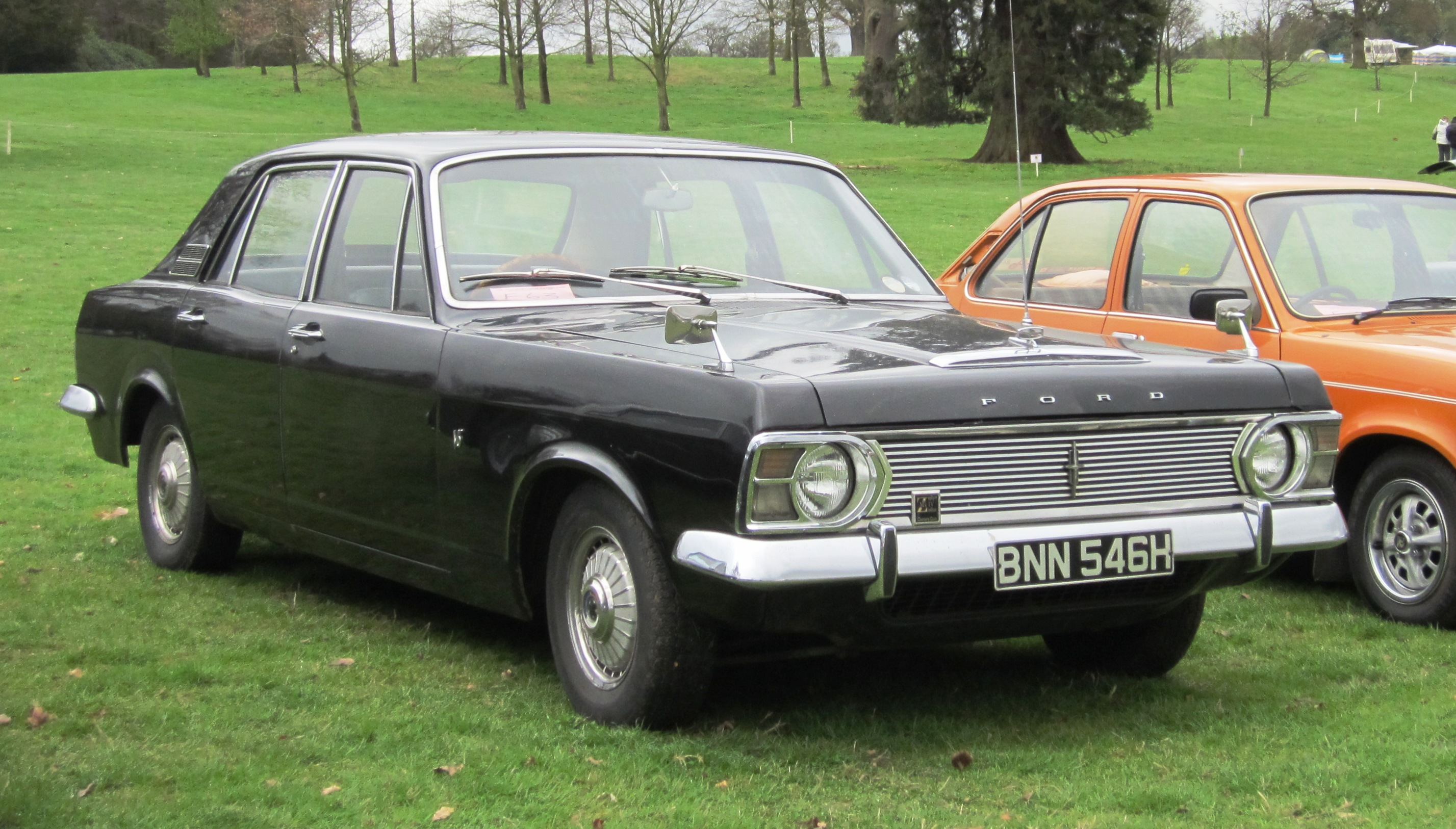
Ford Zephyr 6 Mark IV: the deluxe version gained a dummy grille between the headlights

=== Zodiac and Executive Mark IV ===
Ford Zodiac Mark IV; Ford Executive
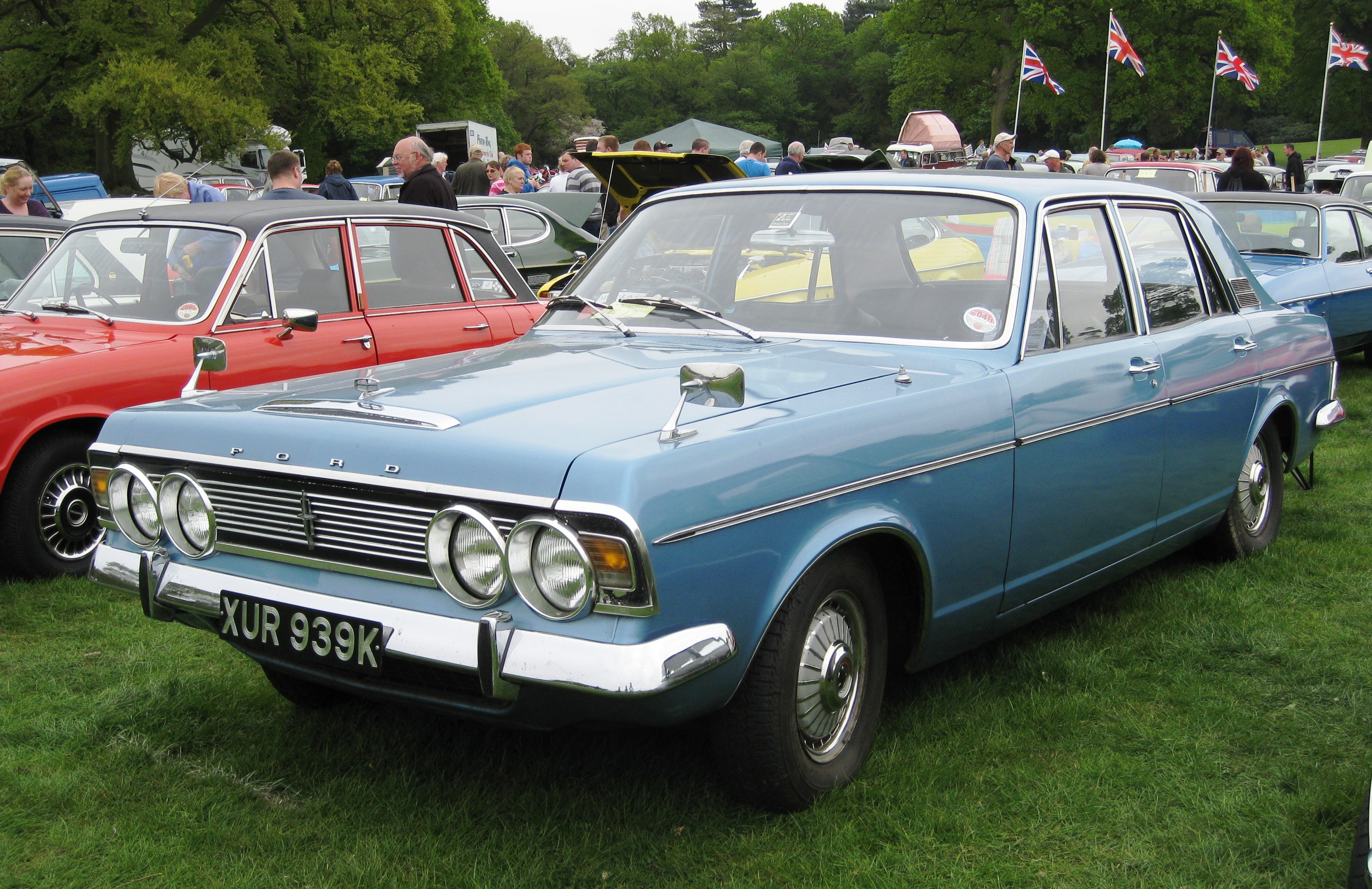
- Ford Zodiac Mark IV Saloon

Overview
- Production: 1966–1972

Body and chassis
- Body style: 4-door saloon; 5-door estate car (conversion)

Powertrain
- Engine: 2,994 cc (182.7 cu in) Essex V6

Models 3012E / 3022E

The Zodiac Mark IV and "Executive" had four headlights and an uprated 2,994 cc (183 cu in) V6 engine. Claimed output was 140 bhp 'net' at 4,750 rpm, with 181.5 lb⋅ft (246.1 N⋅m) of torque at 3,000 rpm. The Zodiac featured an alternator instead of a dynamo on the Zephyr, an adjustable steering column, a spare wheel in the engine compartment, a heater and Aeroflow ventilation, electric window washers, two-speed wipers, a cigar lighter, rev counter (tachometer), clock, ammeter, and reversing lights as standard.

The Zephyr/Zodiac Mark IVs with their complex independent rear suspension design represented a considerable step up when compared to the Mark III big Fords that they replaced. Ford also determined to widen the price gap between the Zephyr and Zodiac versions. In January 1967, less than a year after the car's introduction, Ford announced that production of the Mark IVs was being cut back in response to poor sales. The announcement was accompanied by several pieces of more upbeat news about Cortina sales, and it was stressed that workers taken off Zephyr/Zodiac production would all be redeployed on the Cortina production lines.

An estate version of the Zodiac Mk IV was announced at the same time as the Zephyr equivalent, and built alongside it at Farnham. No "Executive" estate was built.

The "Executive" was an upmarket version, and had the highest specification offered by Ford to UK customers in the 1960s. Automatic transmission (the Zodiac's four-speed manual box with overdrive being also available as a 'no cost' option) along with power steering and a sunroof were standard equipment. Other standard features included fully reclining front seats, walnut fascia, full instrumentation, carpeting throughout, reversing lights, fog lamps, front inertial-reel safety belts, and a radio. The Executive was distinguishable from other models by exterior trim and name badges on the front and rear.

An automatic transmission-equipped Ford Executive was tested by Britain's Autocar in 1967. It had a top speed of 100 mph (160 km/h) and could accelerate from 0-60 mph (97 km/h) in 13.1 seconds. An overall fuel consumption of 17.2 miles per imperial gallon (16.4 L/100 km; 14.3 mpg_{‑US}) was recorded. By these performance criteria, the Ford betrayed its weight, but nevertheless usefully bettered the similarly sized 3.3-L-engined Vauxhall Viscount. The Ford's recommended retail price of £1,567 exceeded the £1,483 sticker price on the Viscount.

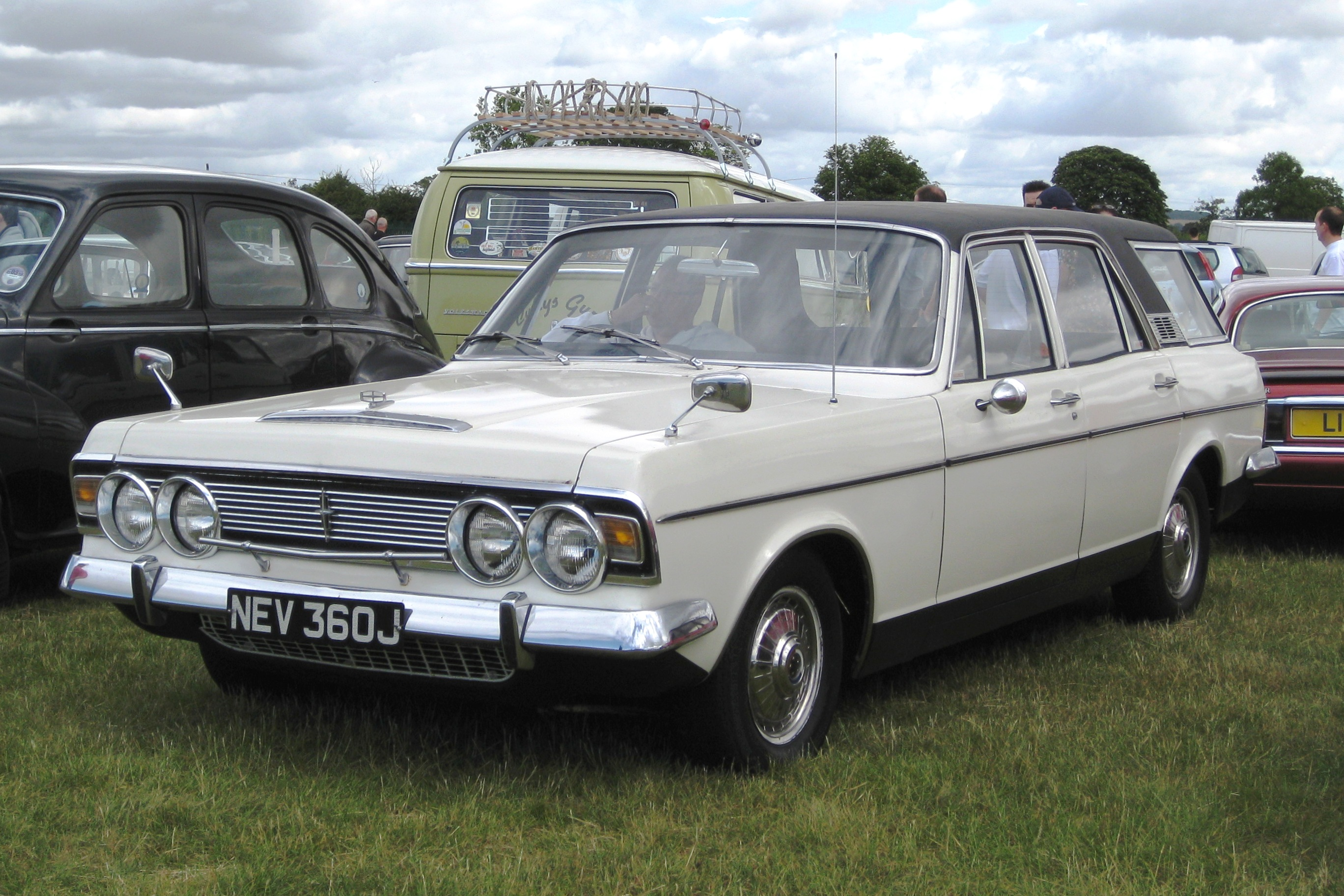
Ford Zodiac Mark IV estate conversion

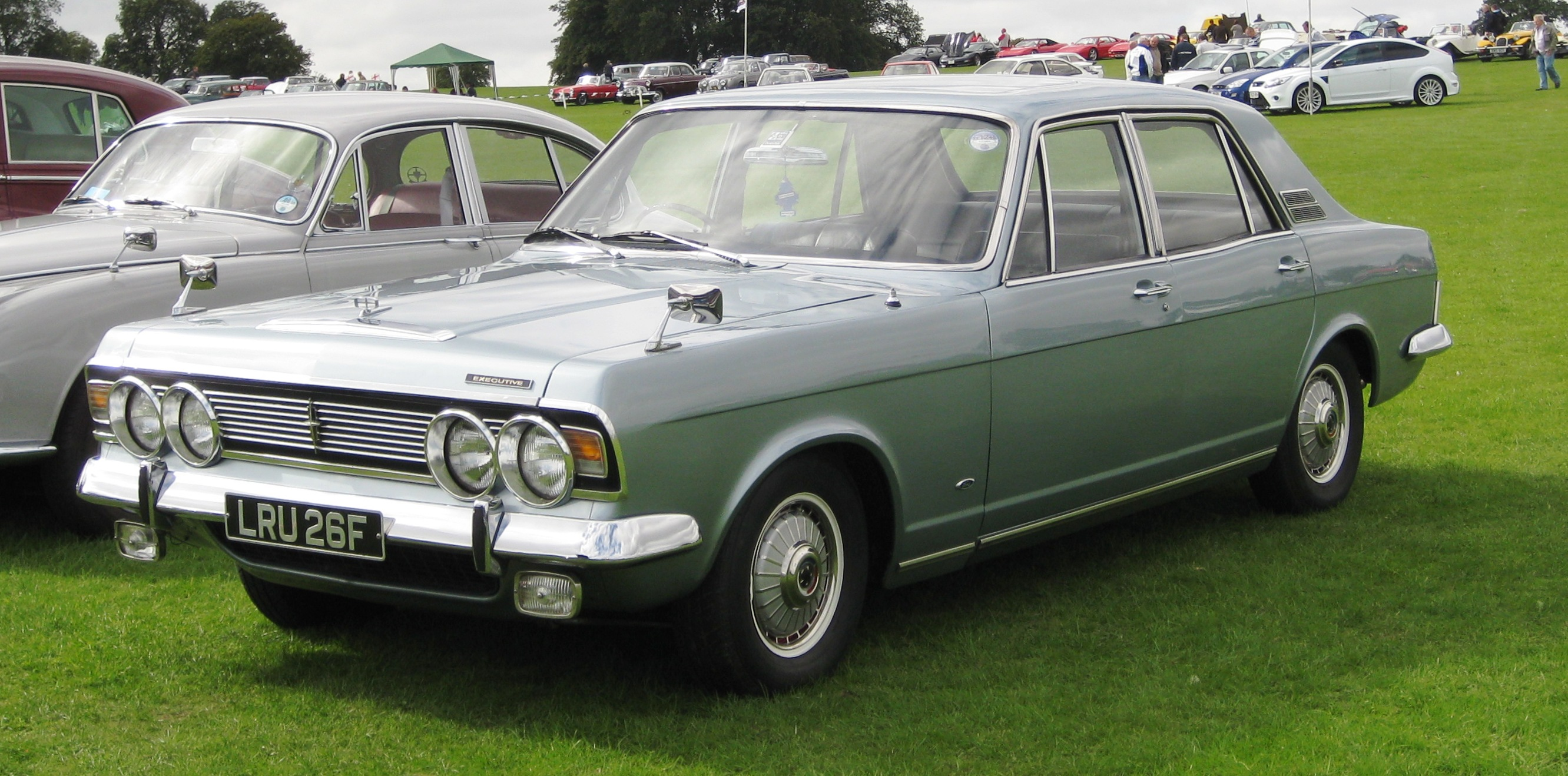
Ford Executive 1967

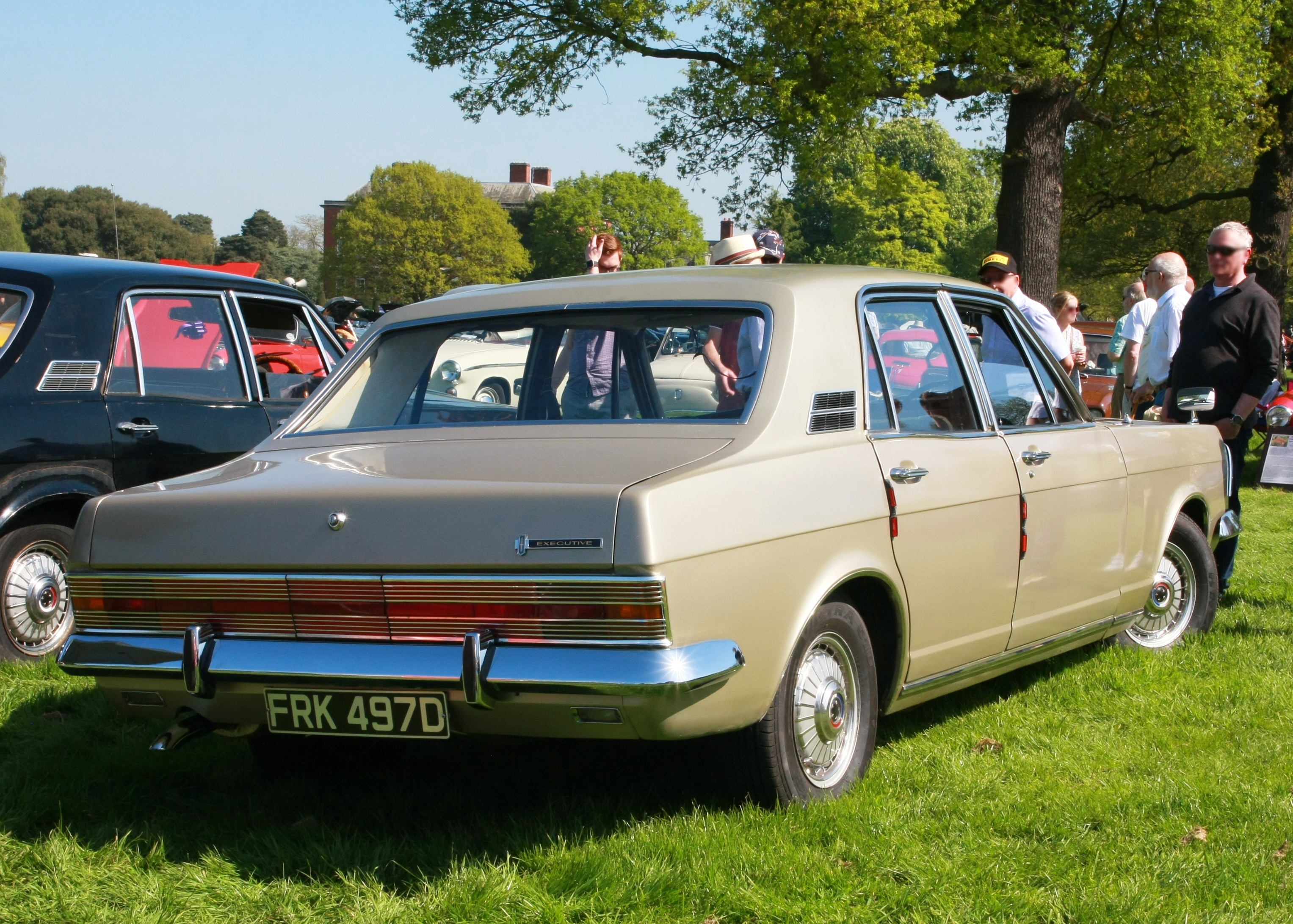
Ford Executive 1966
