= 1951 Monte Carlo Rally =

Rallying motorsport event

1951 Monte Carlo Rally XXI Rallye Automobile de Monte-Carlo
← Previous event	Next event →
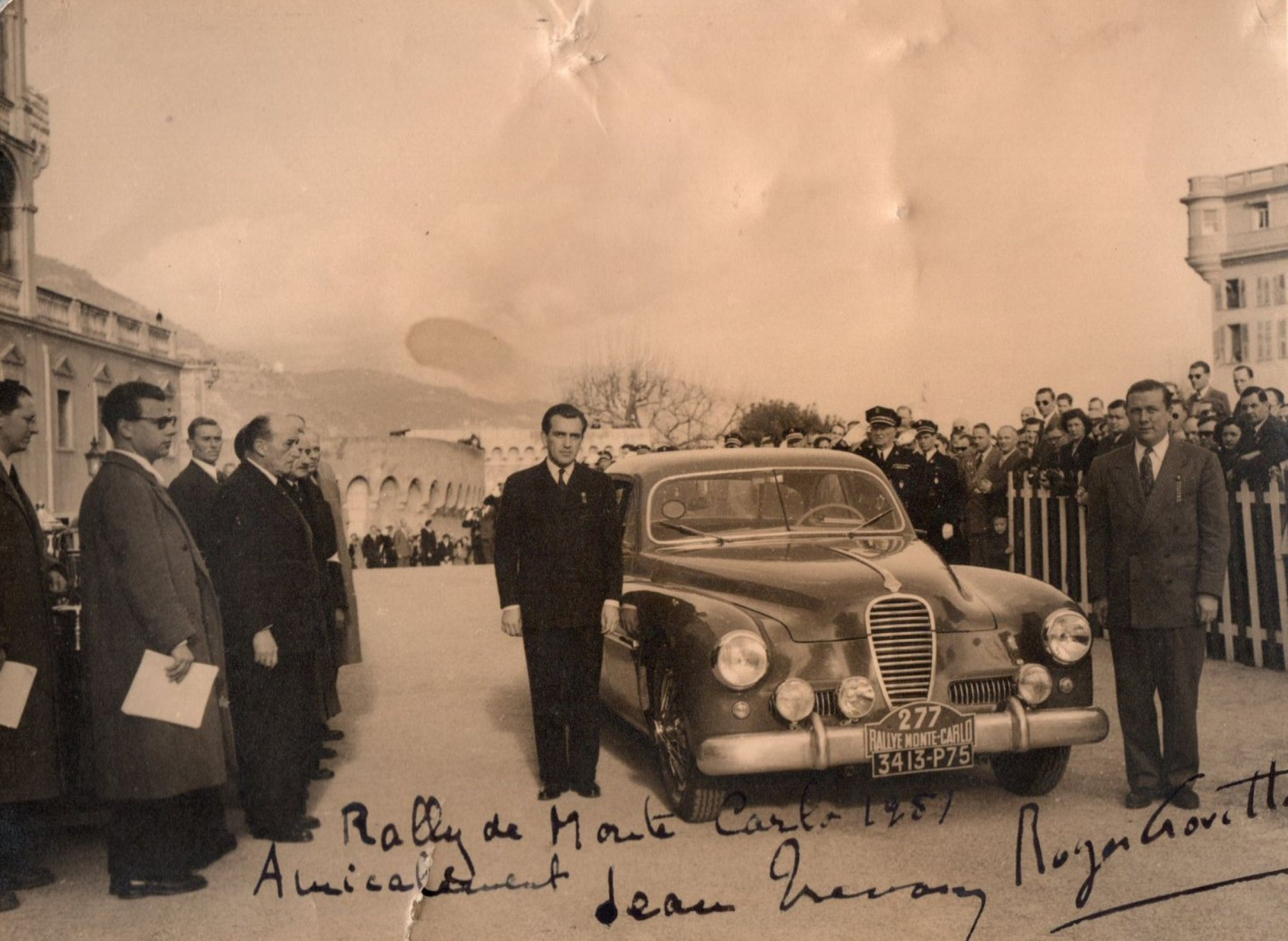
- 1951 Winners
- Host country: Monaco
- Dates run: 23 – 28 January 1951

Statistics
- Crews: 362 at start, 281 at finish

Overall results
- Overall winner: (France) Jean Trévoux; Delahaye 175 S

The 1951 Monte Carlo Rally was the 21st Rallye Automobile de Monte-Carlo. It was won by Jean Trévoux.

== Results ==
Pos.	No.	Driver	Car	Time
1	277	(France) Jean Trévoux	Delahaye 175 S	
2	332	(Portugal) Comte de Monte Real	Ford V8	
3	211	(Republic of Ireland) Cecil Vard	Jaguar Mark V	
4	197	(France) Gaston Gautruche	Citroën 15/6	
5	114	(Monaco) Louis Chiron	Delahaye 175 S	
6	267	(United Kingdom) R. F. Ellison	Jowett Jupiter	
6	306	(United Kingdom) Ken Wharton	Ford 3.6L Pilot	
8	297	(Portugal) M. Nunes dos Santos	BMW 340	
9	254	(United Kingdom) W. H. Waring	Jaguar Mark V	
10	239	(United Kingdom) Gordon Wilkins	Jowett Jupiter	
11	298	(France) M. Heyman	Delahaye 135	
12	186	(France) Pierre Levegh	Talbot Lago Record	
13	314	(France) Maurice Worms	Hotchkiss 686	
14	341	(Portugal) J.D. Ramos Jorge	Hotchkiss 686	
15	321	(France) Louis Rosier	Renault 4CV	
16	154	(France) José Scaron	Simca 8 Sport	
17	312	(Netherlands) Ch. Polis	Bentley Mark VI	
18	187	(Netherlands) K. S. Barendregt	Kaiser K 481	
19	320	(Portugal) J. Ramos Castello Branco	Standard Vanguard	
20	127	(Netherlands) J. B. Hillen	Ford V8	
21	167	(France) Y. Lesur	Simca 8	
22	172	(Switzerland) W. Berger	Talbot 4L	
23	256	(United Kingdom) P. R. Bolton	Bristol 400	
24	150	(Netherlands) J. Knegtel	Ford Vedesse	
25	325	(France) J. Malleret	Citroën 15/6	
26	226	(United Kingdom) L. Odell	Jowett Javelin	
27	305	(United Kingdom) Tommy Wisdom	Sunbeam-Talbot 90	
28	330	(France) R. Ph. Faure	Delahaye 135	
29	218	(United Kingdom) G .R. Holt	Ford Pilot	
30	238	(United Kingdom) P. W. S. White	Ford Pilot	
31	241	(United Kingdom) Reggie Tongue	Jaguar Mark V	
32	269	(United Kingdom) Dorothy Stanley-Turner	Alvis 3L	
33	230	(United Kingdom) Eric Brinkman	Riley 2.5 L	
34	291	(France) G. Laudy	Simca 8 Sport	
35	275	(France) J. Richard Ducros	Simca 8 Sport	
36	346	(France) J. Lecat	Renault 4CV	
37	141	(United Kingdom) C. Edge	Standard Vanguard	
38	215	(United Kingdom) D. H. Murray	Bristol 400	
39	107	(Netherlands) Hans Kreisel	Renault 4CV	
40	263	(United Kingdom) Arthur H. M. Edney	Vauxhall Velox	
41	202	(Germany) P. Muller	Volkswagen Coccinelle	
42	234	(United Kingdom) J. A. McLaughlin	Riley 1.5 L	
43	229	(United Kingdom) Peter Harper	Hillman Minx	
44	205	(France) C. Redele	Renault 4CV	
45	247	(United Kingdom) Maj. A. Pownall	MG 1.5 L Saloon	
46	283	(France) L. Pons	Renault 4CV	
47	276	(France) M. Wulghe	Hotchkiss 686	
48	335	(France) M. Lesurque	Simca 8 Sport	
49	337	(France) M. Collange	Simca 8 Sport	
50	324	(France) Marcel Becquart	Hotchkiss 686	
51	268	(United Kingdom) Norman Garrad	Sunbeam-Talbot 90	
52	209	(United Kingdom) Mike Couper	Bentley Mark VI	
52	236	(United Kingdom) A. S. Bassett	Riley 2.5 L	
54	79	(Netherlands) H. P. Verkamman van Keulen	Mercedes 170 S	
54	290	(France) R. Besse	Citroën 15/6	
56	237	(United Kingdom) Capt. R. P. Minchin	Humber Super Snipe	
57	255	(United Kingdom) T. C. Wise	Jowett Jupiter	
57	315	(France) G. Michel	Simca 8 Sport	
59	100	(France) C. de Ridder	Peugeot 203	
60	278	(France) M. Boulenger	Panhard Dyna X	
61	231	(United Kingdom) J. H. Kemsley	Hillman Minx	
61	303	(France) Mme. de Cortanze	Peugeot 203	
63	203	(Switzerland) R. Lambelet	Simca 8	
63	272	(France) Dr. M. Noix	Peugeot 203	
63	304	(France) M. Bloch	Panhard Dyna X	
66	233	(United Kingdom) H. C. Hobson	Austin A40	
66	309	(France) M. Dubois	Peugeot 203	
68	208	(United Kingdom) K. E. Carter	Humber Super Snipe	
68	334	(Germany) J. Vequaud	Volkswagen Coccinelle	
70	351	(Switzerland) R. Habisreutinger	Bentley Mark VI	
71	264	(United Kingdom) R. Walshaw	Hillman Minx	
71	281	(Netherlands) W. de Jong	Ford V8	
73	198	(Netherlands) W. A. Dwars	Volkswagen Coccinelle	
73	299	(France) J. E. Vernet	Renault 4CV	
75	210	(United Kingdom) Sam Croft Pearson	Lea Francis Mark V	
76	311	(Switzerland) J. Lieb	Ford V8	
77	188	(Monaco) R. Fulconnis	Peugeot 203	
78	302	(France) François Landon	Renault 4CV	
79	199	(France) Eugène Chaboud	Talbot-Lago	
80	328	(France) Ch. Lahaye	Renault 4CV	
81	266	(United Kingdom) J. B. Harington	Austin A40	
82	344	(Netherlands) Dr. Ed. Stutterheim	Ford Vedette	
83	217	(United Kingdom) J. G. Reece	Ford Anglia	
84	245	(United Kingdom) E. J. Newton	Bristol 400	
85	271	(France) C. Preynat	Simca 8 Sport	
86	214	(United Kingdom) R. Nelson Harris	Jowett Javelin	
87	289	(France) O. Hu	Peugeot 203	
88	262	(United Kingdom) W. S. Black	Sunbeam-Talbot 90	
88	348	(Monaco) R. Marchand	Hotchkiss 686	
90	322	(France) H. Archer	Renault 4CV	
91	177	(Netherlands) Jr. H. D. Prins	Ford V8	
92	295	(France) Jean de Montrémy	Panhard Dyna X	
93	204	(France) Ph. Schwartz	Salomon S4	
94	307	(France) P. de Simencourt	Panhard Dyna X	
95	249	(United Kingdom) Ernest Hiskins	Hillman Minx	
96	285	(Portugal) C. Pinto Coelho	Riley 2.5 L	
97	207	(United Kingdom) R. M. Carter	Humber Super Snipe	
98	243	(United Kingdom) M. B. Anderson	Hillman Minx	
99	313	(France) G. Bondorowski	Panhard Dyna X	
100	342	(France) J. Bolleau	Renault 4CV	
