= 1950 Monte Carlo Rally =

Rallying motorsport event

1950 Monte Carlo Rally XX Rallye Automobile de Monte-Carlo
← Previous event	Next event →
- Host country: Monaco
- Dates run: 22 – 27 January 1950

Statistics
- Crews: 308 at start, 136 at finish

Overall results
- Overall winner: (France) Marcel Becquart; Hotchkiss 686 GS

The 1950 Monte Carlo Rally was the 20th Rallye Automobile de Monte-Carlo. It was won by Marcel Becquart.

== Results ==
Pos.	No.	Driver	Car	Time
1	24	(France) Marcel Becquart	Hotchkiss 686 GS	
2	231	(Netherlands) Maurice Gatsonides	Humber Snipe	
3	224	(France) Julio Quinlin	Simca 8	
4	221	(France) José Scaron	Simca 8	
5	222	(France) Marc Angelvin	Simca 8	
6	174	(Sweden) Ingemar Wollert	Buick 4L	
7	219	(Netherlands) Sprenger van Eijk	Chevrolet Fleetmaster	
8	75	(United Kingdom) Sydney Allard	Allard J2 Sport	
9	253	(France) Robert Manzon	Simca 8	
10	138	(Denmark) Robert Nellemann	Ford Pilot	
11	28	(France) M. Dubois	Peugeot 203	
12	169	(Sweden) H. Ohlsson	Volvo PV 444	
13	265	(Switzerland) R. Lambelet	Simca 8	
14	1	(France) Jean Trévoux	Delahaye 175 S	
15	87	(United Kingdom) Peter Harper	Hillman Minx	
16	236	(France) Germaine Rouault	Simca 8	
17	262	(Netherlands) H. van der Heijden	Panhard Dyna	
18	243	(France) Maurice Worms	Hotchkiss 686 GS	
19	27	(France) Jean Sandt	Renault 4CV	
20	157	(Sweden) R. Sjöqvist	Citroën 11	
21	82	(United Kingdom) G.N. Milton	Standard Vanguard	
22	33	(France) G. Averseng	Simca 8	
23	31	(France) J.P. Profichet	Simca 8	
24	171	(Sweden) G. Werngren	Chevrolet Fleetmaster	
25	312	(Belgium) J. Dechamps	Citroën 15/6	
26	43	(France) P.A. Lauvergnat	Citroën 15/6	
27	190	(Germany) Cte. Einsiedel	Volkswagen Coccinelle	
28	280	(France) Guy Lapchin	Panhard Dyna	
29	225	(France) R. Martin	Simca 6	
30	188	(Finland) U. Lamminen	Ford Prefect	
31	130	(United Kingdom) Leonard Potter	Allard 3.6L	
32	261	(Netherlands) J. Kreisel	Renault 4CV	
33	282	(France) C. de Ridder	Peugeot 203	
34	202	(Monaco) Louis Chiron	Ford Vedette	
35	44	(Portugal) J.D.O. Ramos Jorge	Hotchkiss 686	
36	206	(Netherlands) H.C. Heideman	Vauxhall 14-6	
37	285	(Netherlands) A.A. Kouwenberg	Hillman Minx	
38	40	(United Kingdom) Godfrey Imhof	Allard J2 Sport	
39	90	(United Kingdom) M.B. Anderson	Hillman Minx	
40	230	(United Kingdom) G.F. Hayward	Riley 1.5L	
41	238	(France) Pierre Levegh	Ford Vedette	
42	158	(Sweden) V. Hansson	Volvo PV 444	
43	47	(United Kingdom) Tommy Wisdom	Standard Vanguard	
44	120	(United Kingdom) T.C. Wise	Jowett Javelin	
45	242	(Netherlands) Cdt. J. Modderkolk	Citroën 15/6	
46	94	(United Kingdom) G. Hartwell	Sunbeam-Talbot 90	
47	304	(France) Y. Lafargue de Grangeneuve	Simca 8 Cabriolet	
48	78	(United Kingdom) Ch. Glenie	Austin A70	
49	227	(France) G. Blondel	Simca 6	
50	246	(Netherlands) J.T.M. Knegtel	Ford Prefect	
51	36	(France) J.P. De Lacombe	Peugeot 203	
52	240	(France) Y. Lesur	Simca 8	
53	103	(United Kingdom) K.E. Carter	Vauxhall Velox	
54	267	(Netherlands) J.M. Beekman	Citroën 11	
55	152	(Norway) Greta Molander	Saab 92	
56	10	(France) Louis Rosier	Renault 4CV	
57	218	(Netherlands) W. de Jong	Ford 3.9L	
58	113	(United Kingdom) G. R. Holt	Ford Pilot	
59	170	(Sweden) Iwan Hartley	Ford V8	
60	45	(France) R. Loevenbruck	Citroën 11	
61	55	(Spain) M. Giro	Ford V8	
62	239	(United Kingdom) D.H. Greenhalgh	Singer SM 1500	
63	229	(France) J.P. Orsetti	Simca 6	
64	264	(United Kingdom) M. Wick	Allard J2 Sport	
65	56	(Spain) Salvador Fàbregas Bas	Ford V8	
66	95	(United Kingdom) N. Garrad	Sunbeam-Talbot 90	
67	8	(France) F. Landon	Renault 4CV	
68	96	(United Kingdom) John Pearman	Sunbeam-Talbot 90	
69	162	(Sweden) G. Bergquist	Saab 92	
70	124	(United Kingdom) Ernest Hiskins	Hillman Minx	
71	281	(France) Roger Crovetto	Belahaye 135	
72	146	(Denmark) J. Voigt Nielsen	Citroën 11	
73	62	(United Kingdom) K.B. Miller	Jowett Javelin	
74	71	(United Kingdom) P.W.S. White	Ford 3.6 L	
75	175	(Sweden) N. Brauner	Lancia Aprilia	
76	32	(France) Yves Giraud-Cabantous	Ford Vedette	
77	119	(United Kingdom) E.J. Newton	Bristol 400	
78	134	(Netherlands) W.A. Gerlach	Fiat 1100	
79	29	(Netherlands) J.E. Vernet	Renault 4CV	
80	228	(Monaco) L. Sangiorgio	Simca 6	
81	192	(Netherlands) L.J. Savelkouls	Ford 3.6 L	
