= 1949 Monte Carlo Rally =

Rallying motorsport event

1949 Monte Carlo Rally XIX Rallye Automobile de Monte-Carlo
← Previous event	Next event →
- Host country: Monaco
- Dates run: 24 – 30 January 1949

Statistics
- Crews: 230 at start, 166 at finish

Overall results
- Overall winner: (France) Jean Trévoux; Hotchkiss 686 GS

The 1949 Monte Carlo Rally was the 19th Rallye Automobile de Monte-Carlo, the first since the end of the Second World War. It was won by Jean Trévoux. W.M. Couper's lightly used Bentley Mark VI won the Grand Prix d'Honneur in the Comfort Competition.

== Results ==
Pos.	No.	Driver	Car	Notes
1	36	(France) Jean Trévoux	Hotchkiss 686 GS	
2	38	(France) Maurice Worms	Hotchkiss 686 GS	
3	68	(Czechoslovakia) František Dobry	Bristol 400	
4	126	(United Kingdom) Leonard Potter	Allard L 3.6	
5	42	(United Kingdom) Ken Wharton	Ford 3.6 L	
6	49	(France) Paul Vallée	Delahaye 135 MS	
7	22	(France) Jean Laroche	Salmson S4 E	
8	30	(United Kingdom) Alan Godsal	Allard L 3.6	
9	177	(Spain) Manuel Giró i Minguella	Ford V8	
10	159	(Spain) Salvador Fabregas Bas	Talbot 4L	
11	128	(United Kingdom) Godfrey Imhof	Allard 3.9	
12	129	(Netherlands) Countess von Limburg Stirum	Ford V8	
13	66	(France) Louis Rosier	Renault 4CV	
14	10	(United Kingdom) T. C. Wise	Jowett Javelin	
15	75	(France) Berger	Citroën 11	
16	142	(France) Jean Sandt	Citroën 11	
17	85	(France) Norma	Simca 8	
18	88	(France) Boulard	Citroën 11	
19	154	(Netherlands) Maurice Gatsonides	Hillman Minx	
20	12	(United Kingdom) Hall	Lagonda 4.5. L	
21	205	(Portugal) M. J. Palma	Ford V8	
22	131	(United Kingdom) R. Smith	Jowett Javelin	
23	86	(Monaco) Louis Chiron	Austin 16	
24	56	(United Kingdom) Sydney Allard	Allard L 3.6	
25	3	(France) Taulelle	Talbot 2.7 L	
26	60	(United Kingdom) Mike Couper	Bentley Mark VI	
27	50	(France) Brugairolles	Citroën 15/6	
28	158	(Czechoslovakia) S. Kohout/J. Světlík	Tatra 87	
29	4	(France) Peraud	Renault 4CV	
30	63	(France) Dufour	Delahaye 135	
31	7	(Switzerland) Henry Senn	Simca 8	
32	11	(United Kingdom) M. Allison	Lancia Dilambda 8	
33	206	(Portugal) Simão/Chalskelman	Mercury 3.9 L	
34	125	(United Kingdom) P. R. Monkhouse	Sunbeam-Talbot Ten	
35	37	(United Kingdom) Finigan	Standard Vanguard	
36	152	(United Kingdom) Fowler	Healey 2.4 L	
37	140	(United Kingdom) Harper	Vauxhall Velox	
38	113	(Sweden) Verner Hansson	Studebaker Champion	
39	220	(France) François Landon/Ferdinand Auriach	Renault 4CV	
40	172	(France) Marcel Becquart/Henri Secret	Hotchkiss 686	
41	124	(United Kingdom) Nick Haines	Sunbeam-Talbot Ten	
42	184	(United Kingdom) Maurice Wick	Allard M1	JYT950
43	153	(Netherlands) G. Goedhard G.	Volkswagen Typ 11 (1131cc)	
44	74	(France) Pierre Laureys/R. Oury	Renault 4CV	
45	150	(Netherlands) Hugo Reichmann	Bentley Mark VI	
46	130	(Netherlands) L. Feitz	Chrysler New Yorker	
47	135	(United Kingdom) Elsie Mary Wisdom-Gleed/Betty Haig	Morris Minor MM	#1, Coupe des Dames
48	83	(France) Marc Angelvin/Nicole Angelvin	Simca 6	
49	123	(United Kingdom) George Hartwell	Sunbeam-Talbot Ten	
50	72	(Czechoslovakia) Leopold Lancman/Miloslav Šipek	Aero-Minor	
51	6	(France) Bernard Denis/A. Funel	Hotchkiss 864	
52	121	(Sweden) Greta Molander/Helga Åhrberg	Dodge Kingsway	#2, Coupe des Dames
53	207	(Portugal) Manuel Nunes dos Santos/Jaime Rodrigues	Oldsmobile	
54	108	(Sweden) G. Erikson	Dodge Kingsway	
55	1	(France) Roger Montabert/Henri Peignaux	Delahaye 135	
56	103	(Sweden) Iwan Hartley	Simca 8	
