= Betty Haig =

British racing driver

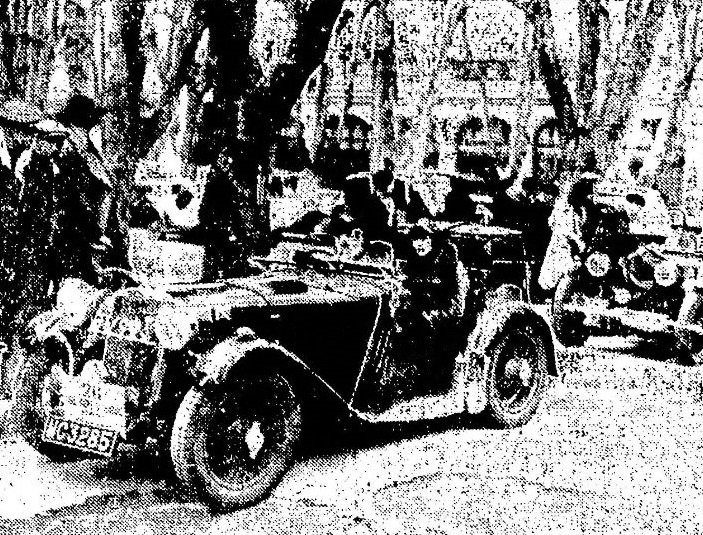
- Born: 1905; Marylebone, London
- Died: 1987 (aged 81–82)
- Wins: 1936 Olympic Rally; 1938 Rallye Paris - Saint-Raphaël Féminin

Elizabeth Haig (1905–1987) was a British racing driver who competed in rallying, hill climbs and historic racing. She won the 1936 Olympic Rally, the first and last time after 1900 that an automobile race was part of the Olympic Games.

== Early life ==
Haig was born in Marylebone, London in 1905.

She was a member of the Scottish whisky-distilling Haig family. Her father was Colonel Oliver Haig. She was also the grand-niece of Field Marshal Douglas Haig, commander of the British Expeditionary Force (BEF) on the Western Front from 1915 to 1919. Her earliest years were spent in the family home in Ramornie in Fife, Scotland. In the early 1920s her parents divorced, and Haig moved to Sussex with her mother and brother.

As a young girl Haig pursued equestrian sports such as riding, hunting and show-jumping. While still a schoolgirl she was taken for a ride in the Fiat Mephistopheles. At 14 Haig bought her first motorised vehicle; a surplus 2¾hp Douglas motorcycle, and at the age of 16 she bought her first car with a gift of £50 from a Great Aunt. This car was destroyed in a fire, and Haig earned money towards the cost of its replacement, an Austin 7 Sports, by selling her story to the press at £10 each. The same year that she purchased the Austin, she first did a lap at Brooklands in her boyfriend Denis Sprague's Talbot 8 car. She attended the very first British Grand Prix in 1926.

Haig and Sprague were married on 16 January 1928 in Fife, but the union did not last. For a time, either during the marriage or shortly after it ended, she lived in Africa.

After finalizing her divorce Haig returned to England. She and flatmate Joyce Lambert bought two 600cc Raleigh motorcycles, which they used to tour across Europe.

Other purchases on her return to England included a variety of cars, including a second Morgan and a variety of MGs.

In the early 1930s (the year is reported to have been either 1930 or 1933), Betty crashed her Morgan Super Sport on the Kingston bypass, killing passenger Molly Watkins.

== Racing ==
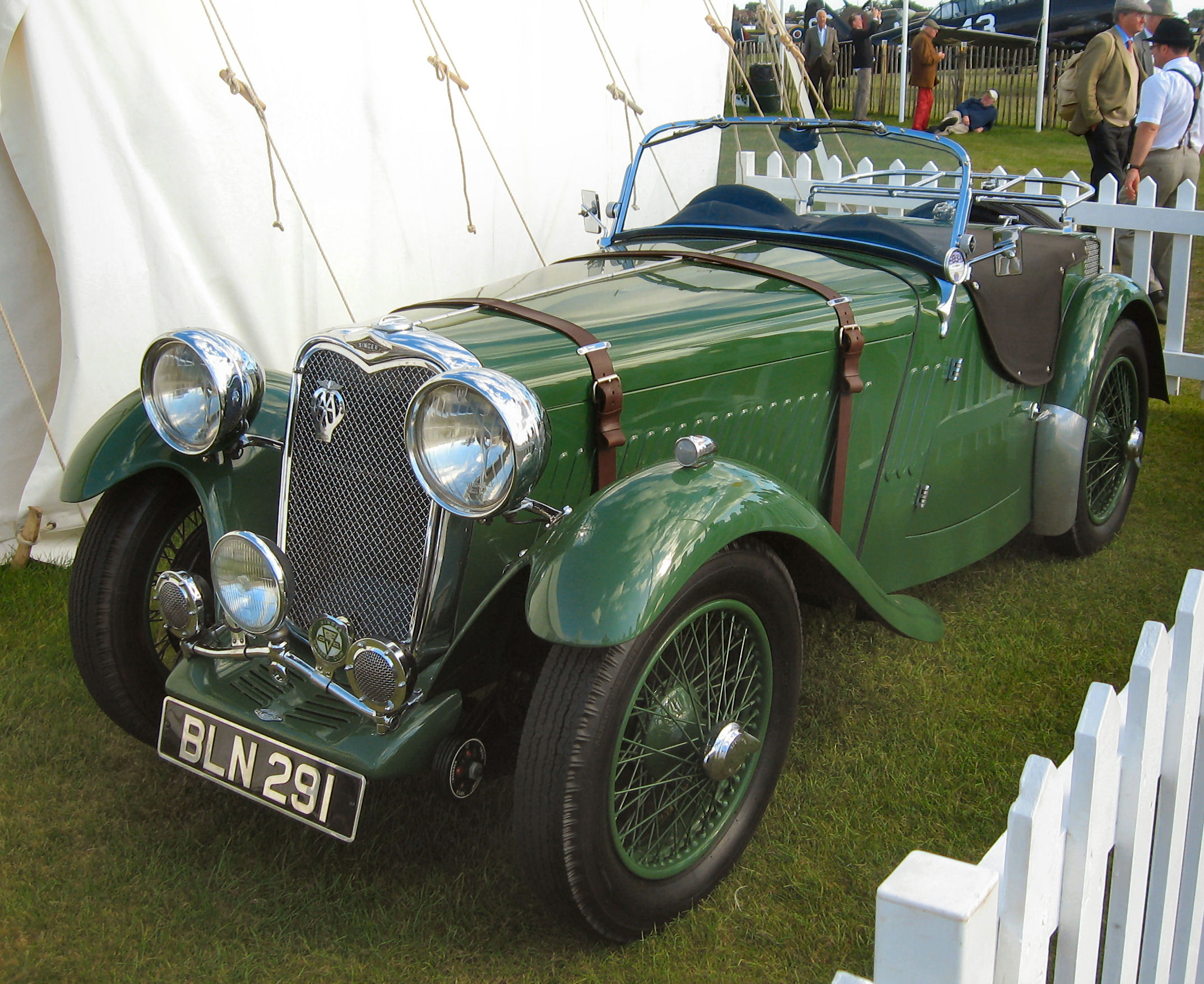
A 1934 Singer 1½-Litre Le Mans 2-seater Sport.

The first race Haig entered was the Junior Racing Drivers Club Speed Hill Climb Chalfont St Peter in 1934, which she ran with her recently acquired Singer Nine Le Mans, registration AKV 795. That same year she and Joyce Lambert entered the Rallye Paris - Saint-Raphaël Féminin. The duo completed the race, and Haig's report to Singer on the car's performance earned her factory support for return to the event in 1936, which she drove solo but suffered a gearbox failure during the race.

Haig's first appearance at an event held on a racing track was in 1935 at the JCC High Speed Trials, where she drove her Aston Martin.

In 1936 Haig won a gold medal for finishing first in the Olympic Rally held in conjunction with the 1936 Summer Olympics. Haig used a six-cylinder Singer Nine Le Mans in the race, and was accompanied by co-driver Lambert.

On 7 May 1938 Haig was injured at Brooklands, but not while driving. A Delage had caught fire while at speed and as driver Joseph Paul tried to exit the track his car was struck by the Darracq driven by A. C. Lace, sending the burning Delage through the fencing and down into the off-track area. Haig was among eleven injured. There was also one death.

Beginning in the late 1940s, Haig worked as a journalist, authoring articles and race reports for popular magazine Motor Sport.

== Later years ==
In the post-war years, beginning in the 1950s, Haig tended to favour club events and hillclimbs over the larger events.

She made regular appearances at Goodwood, among other locations, through the 1950s. During this period Haig was also driving open-wheeled single-seaters, racing a Cooper 1000 in 1950 and a Cooper 500 the next year.

She won the National Ladies Hillclimb Championship two years running in 1960 and 1961 in a Coventry-Climax powered Lotus Seven. Haig held the Ladies’ hillclimb record at Prescott for six years.

In 1966 Haig and photographer Guy Griffiths established the Historic Sports Car Club (HSCC).

Haig was also a charter member of such clubs as the Frazer Nash car Club and the Porsche Club of Great Britain.

In her later years Haig resided at Shellingford House, a former vicarage, in Shellingford, Oxfordshire. She lived there with her frequent co-driver and long-time companion Barbara Marshall until the latter's death in early 1977.

Haig died early in 1987.

Haig is memorialised by events such as the Triple-M Register's Betty Haig Cup for best racing performance of the year, the Betty Haig Memorial Trophy for the fastest time by a lady competitor in a racing car at Prescott, and the AC Owners' Club's Betty Haig Trophy for fastest lady member on handicap at Goodwood.

== Cars ==
Over the course of her life Haig owned a large number of vehicles, with one magazine article reporting that she had owned more than 60 cars by the mid-1960s. The list included both road cars and purpose-built racers, with representatives from marques like A.B.C., A.C. Cars, Alvis, Aston Martin, Austin, Austin-Healy, BMW, Bugatti, Cooper, Elva, Frazer Nash, H.R.G., Healey, Jaguar, Lotus, MG, Morgan, Morris, Salmson, Singer, Triumph, and Turner, among others. Some of the most significant cars are listed below.

- 1922 A.B.C. — This air-cooled, flat-twin powered roadster was Haig's very first car.
- 1934 Singer Nine Le Mans Sports Special — This 1½ lire OHC straight-six model, registration BLN 291, was the car Haig drove to a Gold medal victory in the 1936 Olympic rally.
- 1953 Austin-Healey 100 — Purchased by Haig on 16 July 1953, this car was an aluminium-bodied pre-production example, and the first right-hand drive car built. Registered as NUE 854, Haig drove this car in the 1954 Rallye Paris - Saint-Raphaël Féminin.
- 1954 AC Ace - Chassis number AE 01, registered as UPJ 75, this was the first AC Ace built by AC Cars.
- 1958 Lotus Seven — In 1960 Haig bought Chassis #421, registered as VGJ4. Essentially a Lotus Eleven with Seven bodywork, this car came with a de Dion tube rear suspension, four-wheel disc brakes, and a 1,460 cc (89.1 cu in) Coventry-Climax FWB engine tuned to Formula Two (F2) specifications.
- BMW 328 — Haig managed to trim £300 off the £700 price of the car by buying it jointly with roommate and racing driver Enid Riddell, who did not have permanent British residency, and registering it in Budapest, rather than England. The car had registry number EYW 3.
- Jaguar XKSS — A D-Type brought to full XKSS spec., this was Haig's fastest road car. Originally registered as WVM 3, it was re-registered as BLH 7.

== Racing career ==
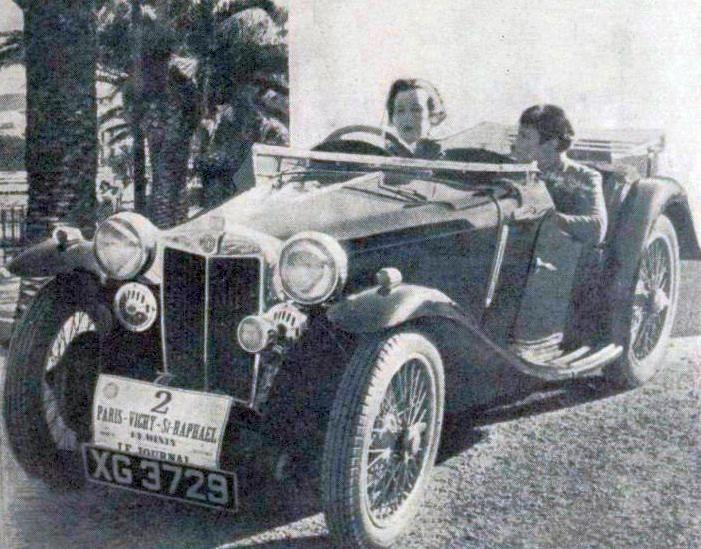
Betty Haig winner of the 1938 Rallye Paris - Saint-Raphaël Féminin in an MG PB.

- Olympic Rally
  - 1936 — Overall win with co-driver Joyce Lambert, in a Singer Le Mans 1500.
- Rallye des Alpes Françaises
  - 1946 — Second place with a class win in the 2 L class and the Coupe des Dames trophy, driving a 1937 AC 16/80 Competition Sports, registration EPJ 101. Co-driver Enid Riddell.
  - 1949 — Seventh overall and class win in the 1.5 L class and the Coupe des Dames with co-driver Barbara Marshall in an MG TC.
- 24 Hours of Le Mans
  - 1951 — Fifteenth place and third in class in the Luigi Chinetti 2 L Ferrari 166MM Coupé with co-driver Yvonne Simon.
- Rallye Paris - Saint-Raphaël Féminin:
  - 1938 — First place in an MG PB, and performance index
  - 1939 — Third place in an MG.
  - 1951 — Third place in an MG TD, with a class win.
  - 1954 — Seventh overall and a class win in the 2000–3000 cc class, and a Coupe de Vitesse. Driving an Austin-Healey 100 with co-driver Enid Riddell.
- Monte Carlo Rally
  - 1949 — Second in Ladies Class in a Morris Minor. Co-drivers Elsie Wisdom and Barbara Marshall.
  - 1950 — In an MG YA, registration OWL543. Co-driver Barbara Marshall.
