= Fiat 1100 (1937) =

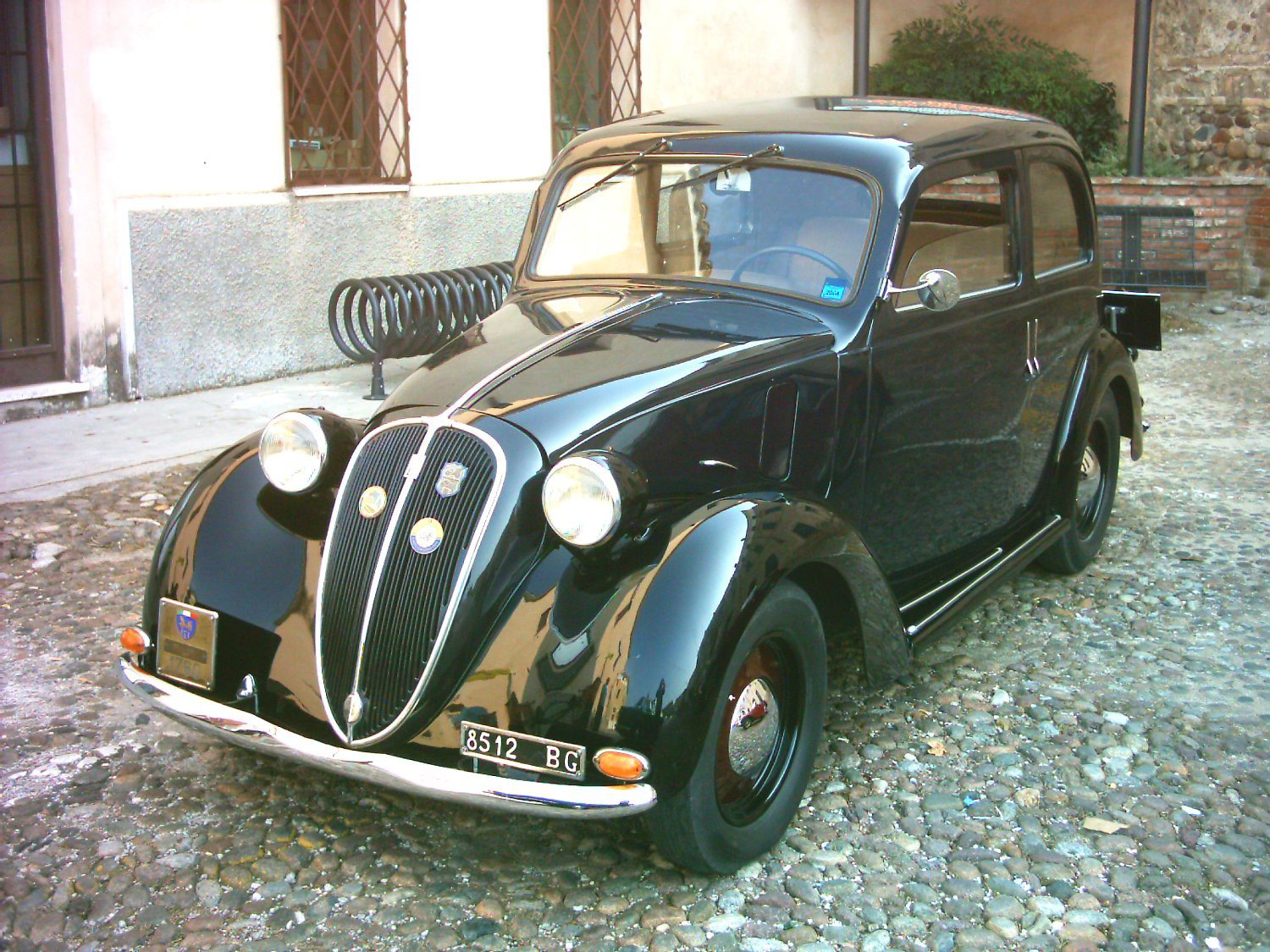
- A Fiat 508 C

Overview
- Manufacturer: Fiat
- Also called: Fiat 508 C "Balilla 1100"
- Production: 1937–1953

Body and chassis
- Class: Small family car (C)
- Body style: 4-door 4-window saloon; 4-door 4-window convertible saloon; 4-door 6-window LWB saloon; 4-door torpedo; 2-door cabriolet; 2-door spider; 2-door berlinetta (Mille Miglia); 2-door pickup truck; 2-door van
- Layout: Front-engine, rear-wheel-drive
- Related: Simca 8

Powertrain
- Engine: 1,089 cc I4
- Transmission: 4-speed manual

Dimensions
- Wheelbase: Standard: 2,420 mm (95.3 in); Long: 2,700 mm (106.3 in)

Chronology
- Predecessor: Fiat 508 Balilla
- Successor: Fiat 1100/103

The Fiat 1100 is a small family car produced from 1937 to 1953 by the Italian car manufacturer Fiat. It was introduced in 1937 as Fiat 508 C or Balilla 1100, as a replacement for the Fiat 508 Balilla. Under the new body the 508 C had more modern and refined mechanicals compared to the 508, including independent front suspension and an enlarged overhead valve engine. In 1939 it was updated and renamed simply Fiat 1100. The 1100 was produced in three consecutive series—1100, 1100 B and 1100 E—until 1953, when it was replaced by the all-new, unibody Fiat 1100/103.

== History ==
=== Fiat 508 C ===
The Fiat 508 C was first introduced in 1937. It was powered by a 1,089 cc four-cylinder overhead-valve engine rather than the earlier Balilla's 1-litre unit. Power was up by a third, to 32 PS (24 kW) at 4,000 rpm. Drive was to the rear wheels through a 4-speed gearbox, and for the period, its comfort, handling, and performance were prodigious, making it "the only people's car that was also a driver's car". Unusual for a modestly priced car of the time was the independent front suspension, while the rear had a leaf sprung live axle. According to the manufacturer top speed was 110 km/h (68 mph).

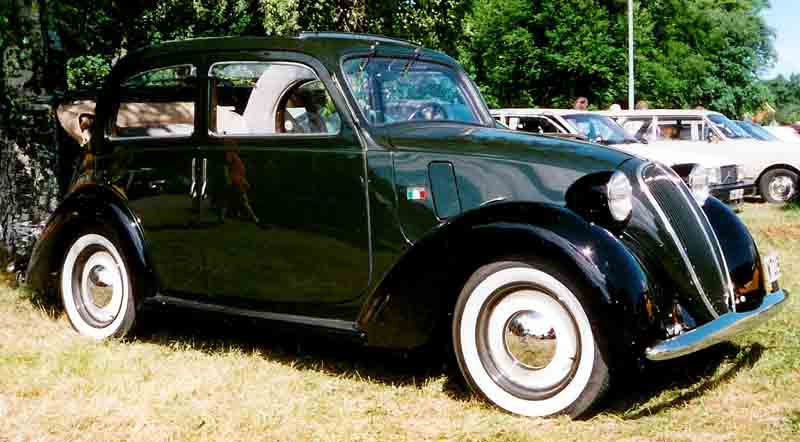
A 508 C convertible saloon

Exterior styling recalled the 1935 Fiat 1500 and the 1936 Fiat 500 "Topolino", with the typical mid-thirties, heart-shaped front grille. The main body style for the Fiat 508 C was a 4-door pillarless saloon with 4 side windows (two windows on each side without the rear quarter window), and suicide doors at the rear. Other body styles listed by Fiat were a 4-door convertible saloon (saloon with folding roof, based on the standard 4-door model), a 4-door torpedo, a 2-door 4-seat cabriolet, and, for a brief period, a sporty, 2-door 2-seat spider built by Carrozzeria Viotti.

In 1938 Fiat put on sale a long-wheelbase six-passenger variant, named 508 L. Besides the 280 mm (11.0 in) extended wheelbase (at 2,700 mm or 106.3 in), other differences from the 508 C were wider wheels and tyres (5.50–15 instead of 5.00–15 tyres) and a shorter final drive ratio, which reduced top speed to 95 km/h (59 mph). The 508 L was sold as a 4-door, 6-window saloon, pillarless and with rear-hinged aft doors like the 508 C, able to carry six passenger thanks to two foldaway seats. Additionally there was a 4-door, 6-window taxi (Tassì) version, which differed in possessing a B-pillar—to which all four doors were hinged—and a partition between the driver and passenger compartments. Indeed, most 508 L saloons saw service as taxis or livery cars. The lengthened 508 L also formed the base for two light commercial vehicles, a van (Italian name 508 L Furgoncino) and a platform lorry (508 L Camioncino).

Again in 1938 a sports model was introduced, the 42 PS (31 kW) 508 C Mille Miglia.

=== Fiat 1100 ===
In 1939 the car underwent a restyling of the front end and became the Fiat 1100, often (inappropriately) referred to as 1100 A to distinguish it from the later variants. The car had gained a taller, pointed grille—which earned it the popular nickname of 1100 musone, i. e. "big muzzle"—with horizontal chrome bars, the top three extending back over window-shaped louvres on each side of the redesigned engine bonnet. Available body styles were six, all carried over from the previous model: saloon, convertible saloon, cabriolet, sports berlinetta, long-wheelbase saloon and taxi. No significant changes were made to the car's mechanicals.

A van model was also built, beginning in 1941. Called the 1100 F for furgoncino it was developed together with Viotti. After the war, it became the 1100 ALR, followed by the BLR and ELR as per the saloon's development.

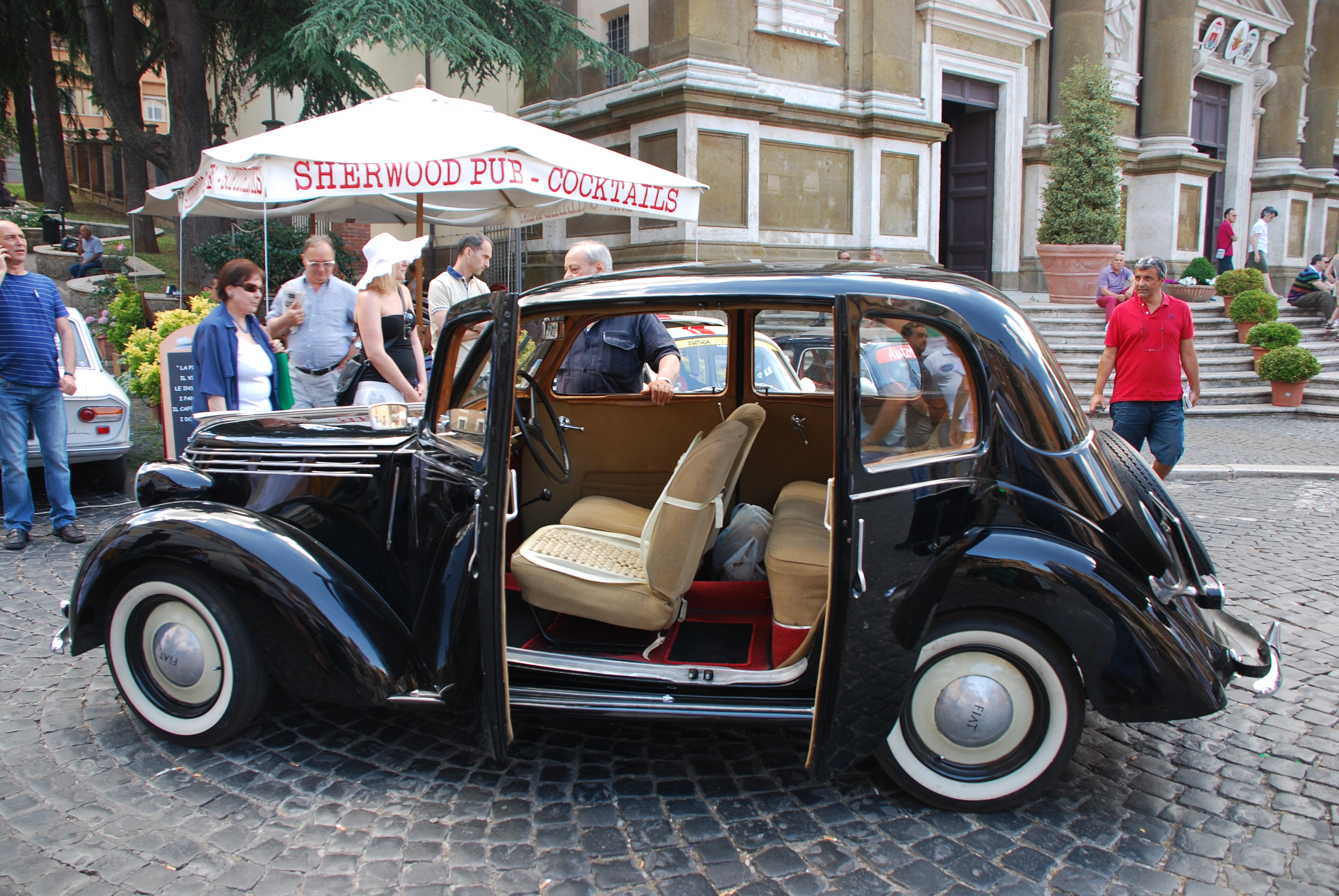
Fiat 1100 Berlina; the body is pillarless and has backwards-opening rear doors

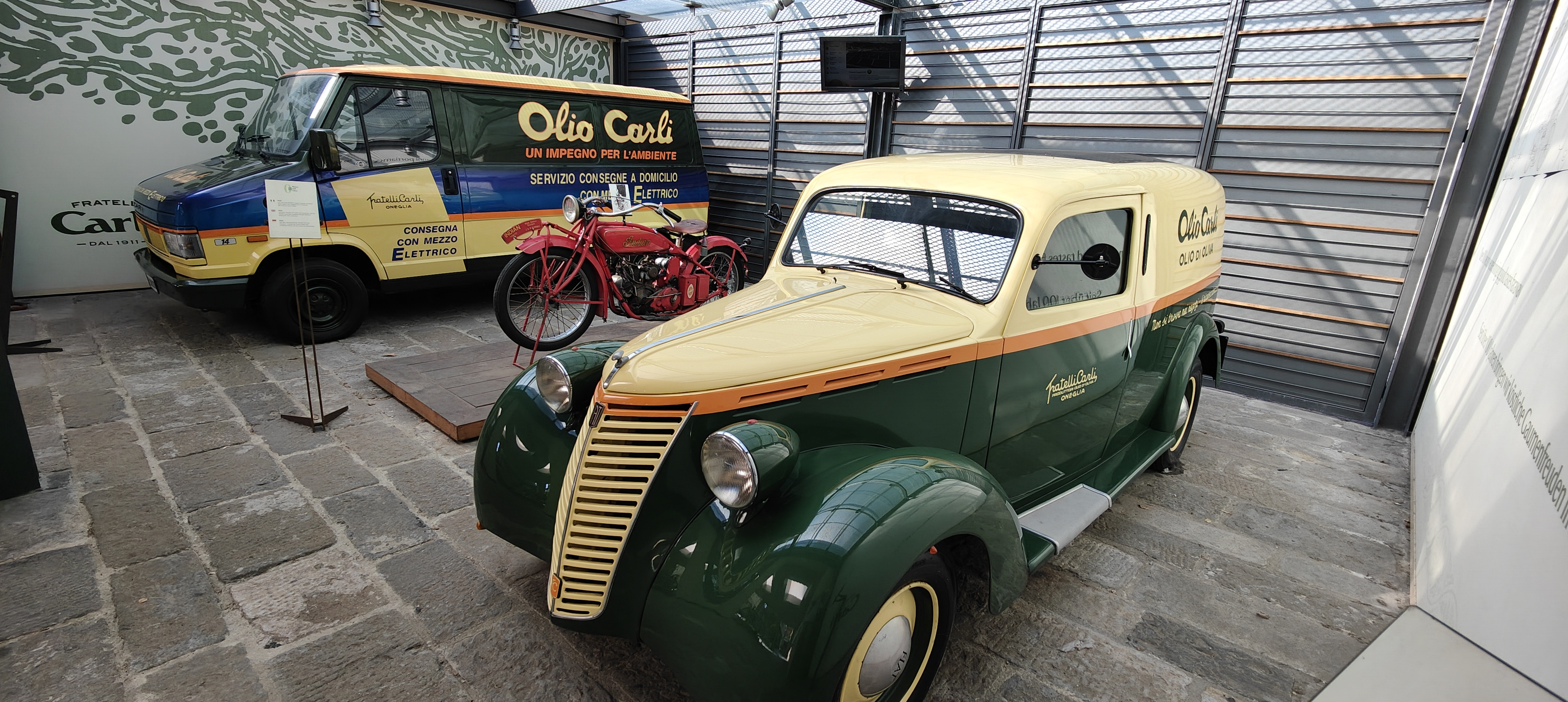
1946 Fiat 1100 van

=== Fiat 1100 B ===
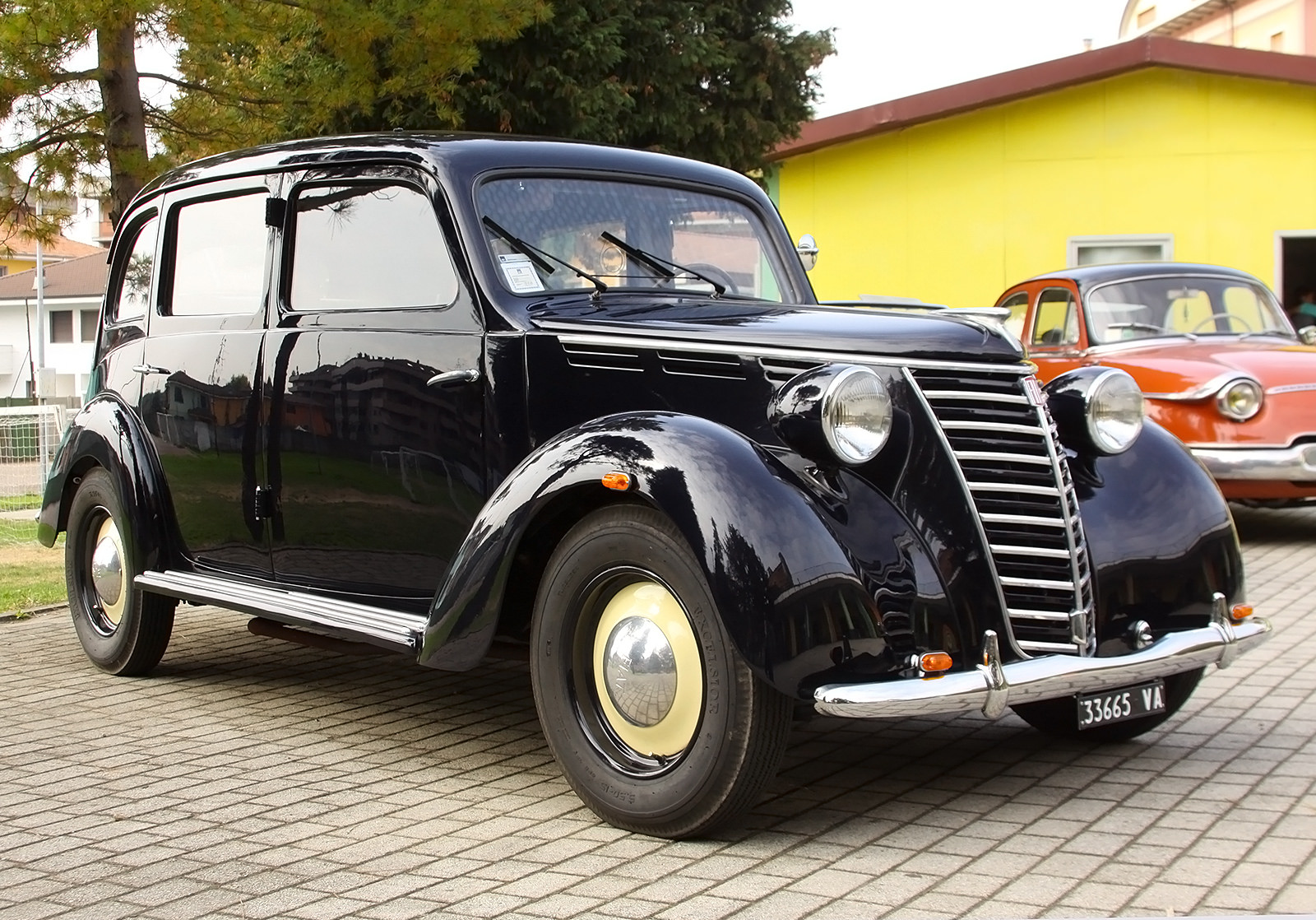
1948 Fiat 1100 BL Tassì (long wheelbase)

After World War II, production continued mostly unchanged until September 1948, when the 1100 received some mechanical and interior upgrades. This model was renamed 1100 B. The revised type 1100 B engine produced 35 PS (26 kW) at 4,400 rpm thanks to improved inlet and exhaust manifolds and a larger 32 mm diameter choke carburettor. The BL continued to use the 30 PS (22 kW) version of the engine. Inside the cabin there was a two-spoke steering wheel instead of the previous three-spoke one, new instrumentation and new trim. The 1100 B was available as saloon, long-wheelbase saloon and taxi. In total 25,000 were made between 1948 and 1949.

The 1100 B lasted only about one year.

=== Fiat 1100 E ===
At the end of the summer of 1949, the car was re-introduced with a curvy, exterior boot, a column shifter, and a new name: 1100 E. A longer wheelbase, EL model was also available, although only for taxi use after 1950. This somewhat more modern look lasted until April 1953, when it was replaced by the all-new, ponton-design Fiat 1100/103.

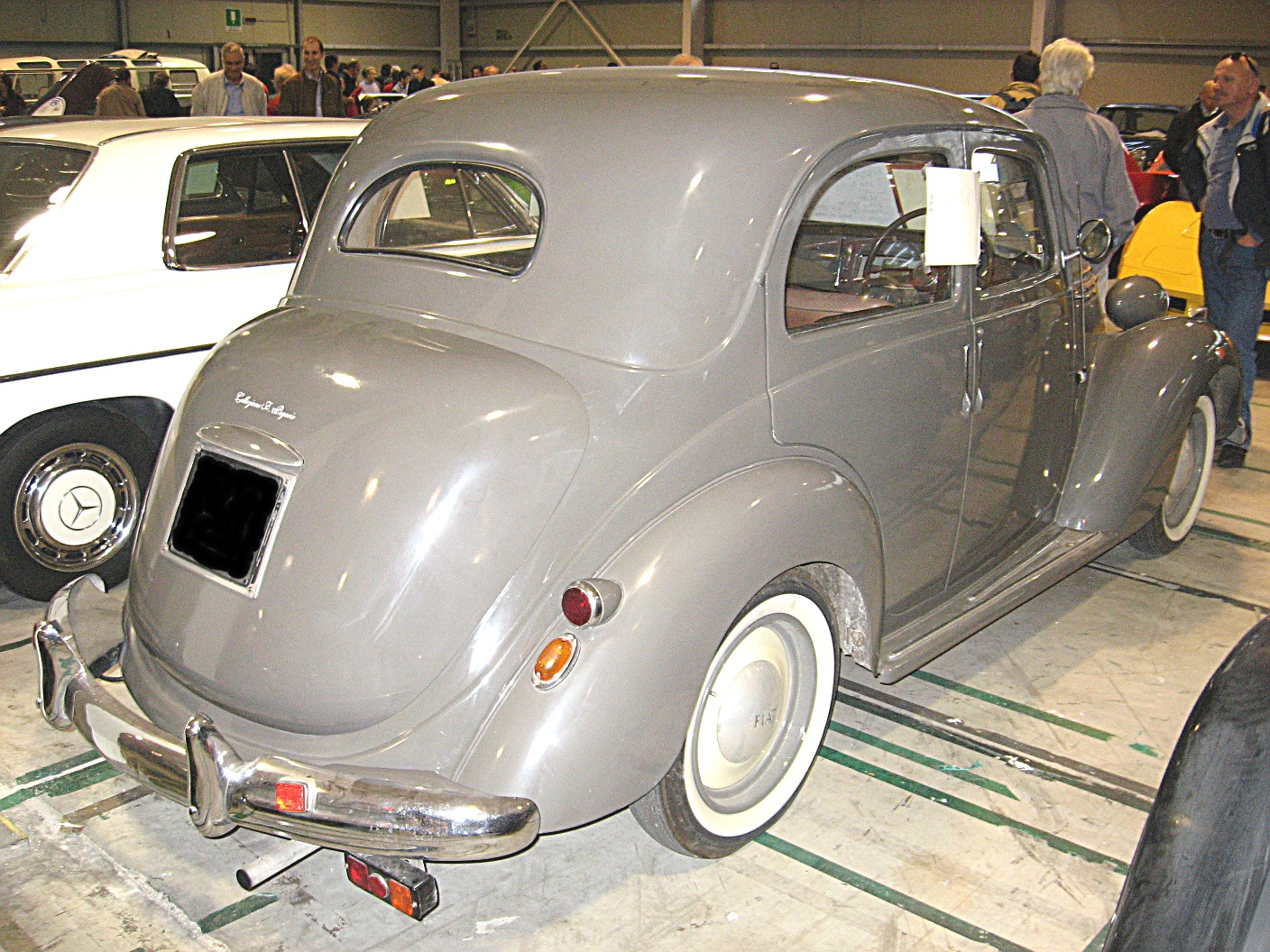
Fiat 1100 E with the new, exterior boot

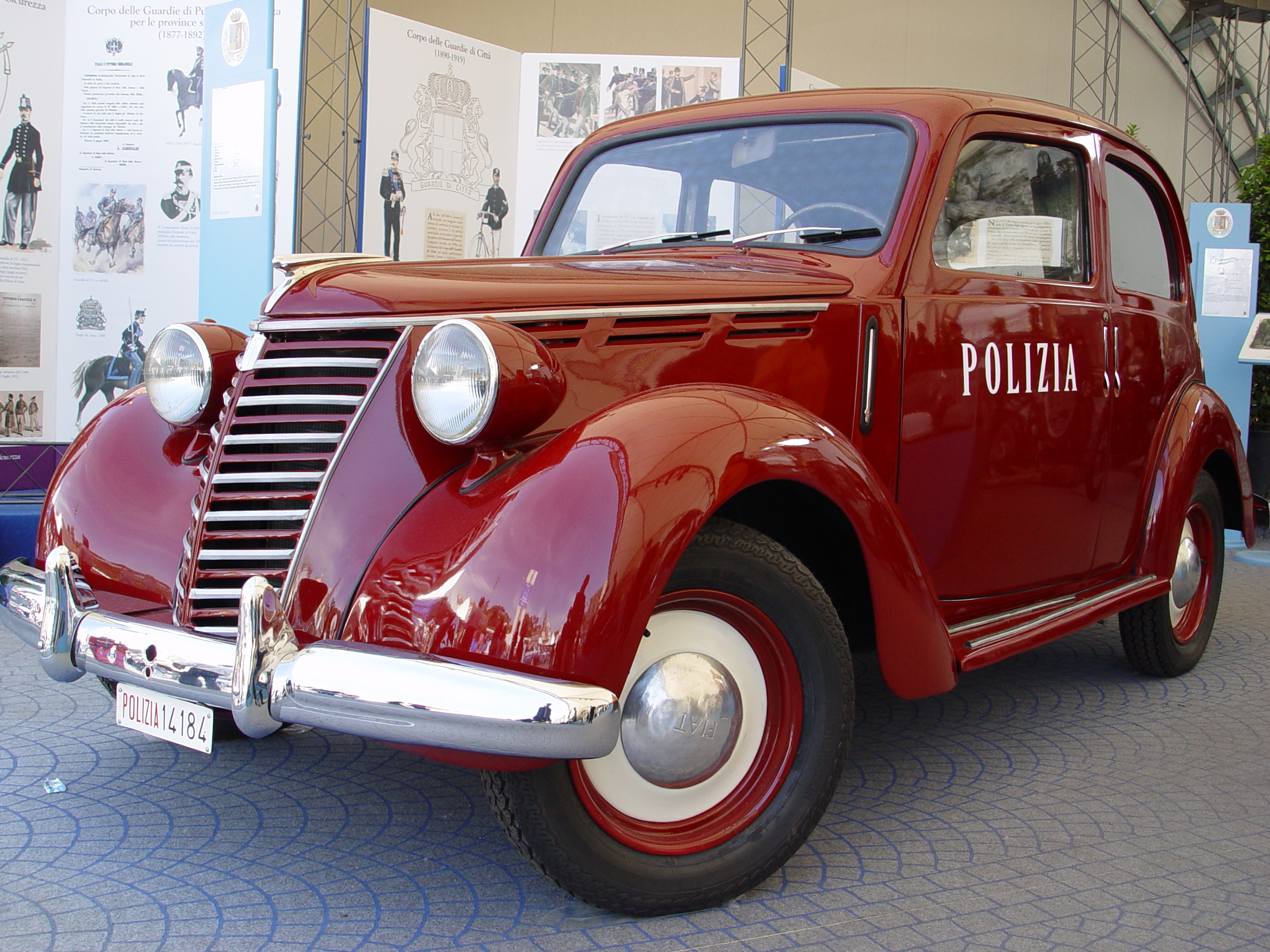
The 1100 E's front end remained mostly unchanged since the pre-war 1100

== Derivatives ==
Fiat's French partner Simca also manufactured the 1100 from 1937 until 1951, as the Simca 8. Beginning in 1949, Simca also used a 1,221 cc derivative of the Fiat tipo 102C engine, a variant not used in Italy until the 1957 Fiat 1200 Granluce.

=== 508 C Mille Miglia ===
Fiat 508 C Mille Miglia
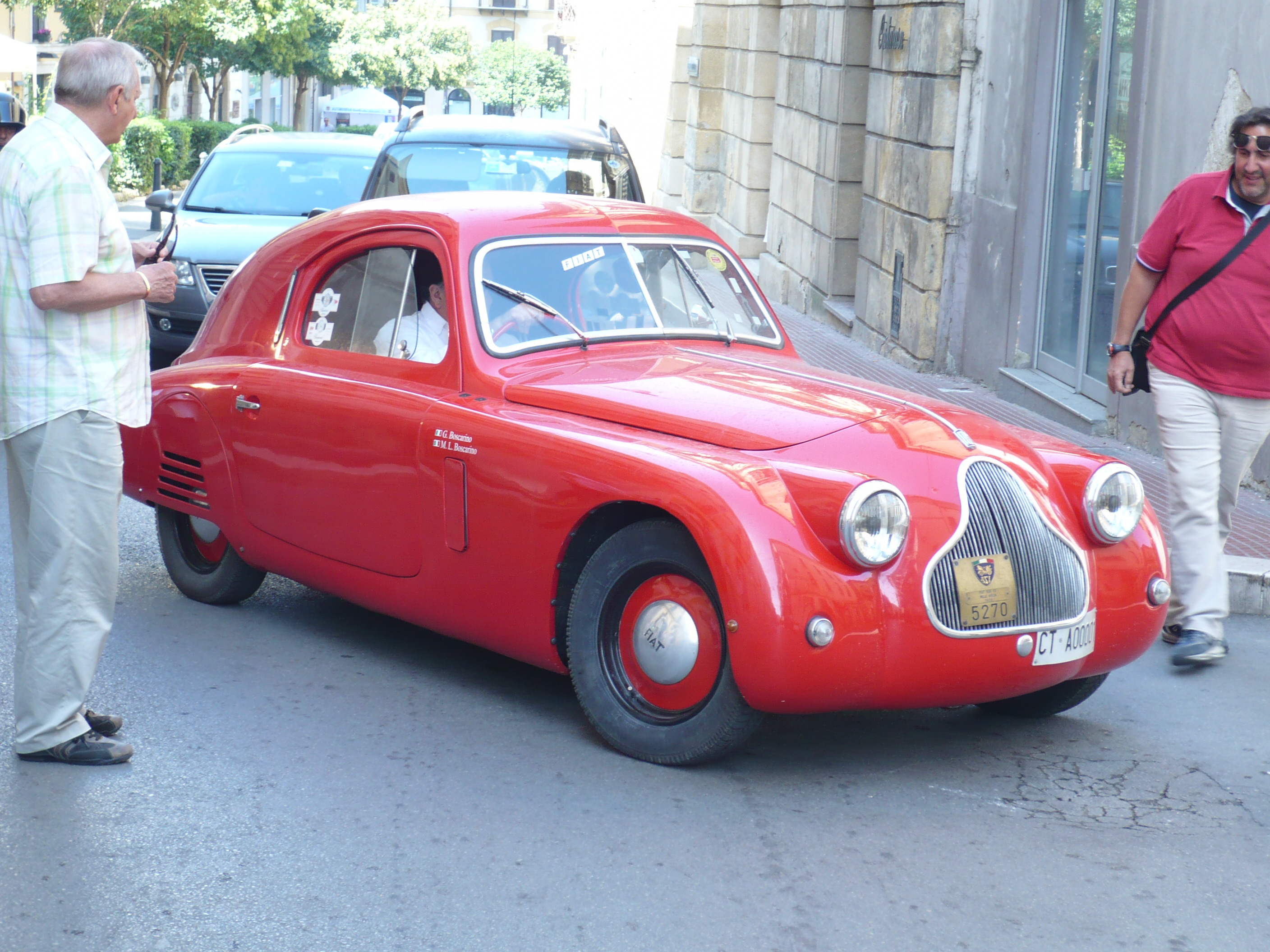
- 508 C MM, 1939 version

Overview
- Production: 1938–1939

Body and chassis
- Body style: 2-door berlinetta

Powertrain
- Engine: 1,089 cc I4
- Transmission: 4-speed manual

Dimensions
- Wheelbase: 2,420 mm (95.3 in)
- Length: 4,185 mm (164.8 in)
- Width: 1,480 mm (58.3 in)
- Height: 1,340 mm (52.8 in)
- Kerb weight: 820 kg (1,808 lb)

The Fiat 508 C Mille Miglia was a 2-door, 2-seat berlinetta sports car based on the 508 C chassis and engine, produced in 1938 and 1939. At the 1938 Mille Miglia race the debuting 508 C MM won its class, recording an average speed of 112 km/h (70 mph) and placing 16th overall.

The novel coupé body had a peculiar but highly aerodynamic shape, characterised by a flat, elongated roofline, an abruptly cut off tail, and some very modern traits like an uninterrupted fender line and smooth sides—a first on a Fiat. As the Mille Miglia model was developed mainly to help promote the new 508 C by competing in motor racing, the chassis had to be carried over from the saloon and couldn't be lowered or altered to reduce the frontal area. Therefore, in order to up the car's top speed Fiat's Ufficio tecnico vetture (motor car engineering and design department, headed by Dante Giacosa) had to optimise the body shape to lower its drag coefficient—even at the cost of sacrificing interior room and rear visibility. According to Giacosa inspiration for the sports coupé's body came from observing that during test runs a prototype 500 Topolino-based van could reach a higher top speed than the saloon it was based on. The shape of the body was then perfected using a number of 1:5 scale models and the wind tunnel of the Politecnico di Torino university.

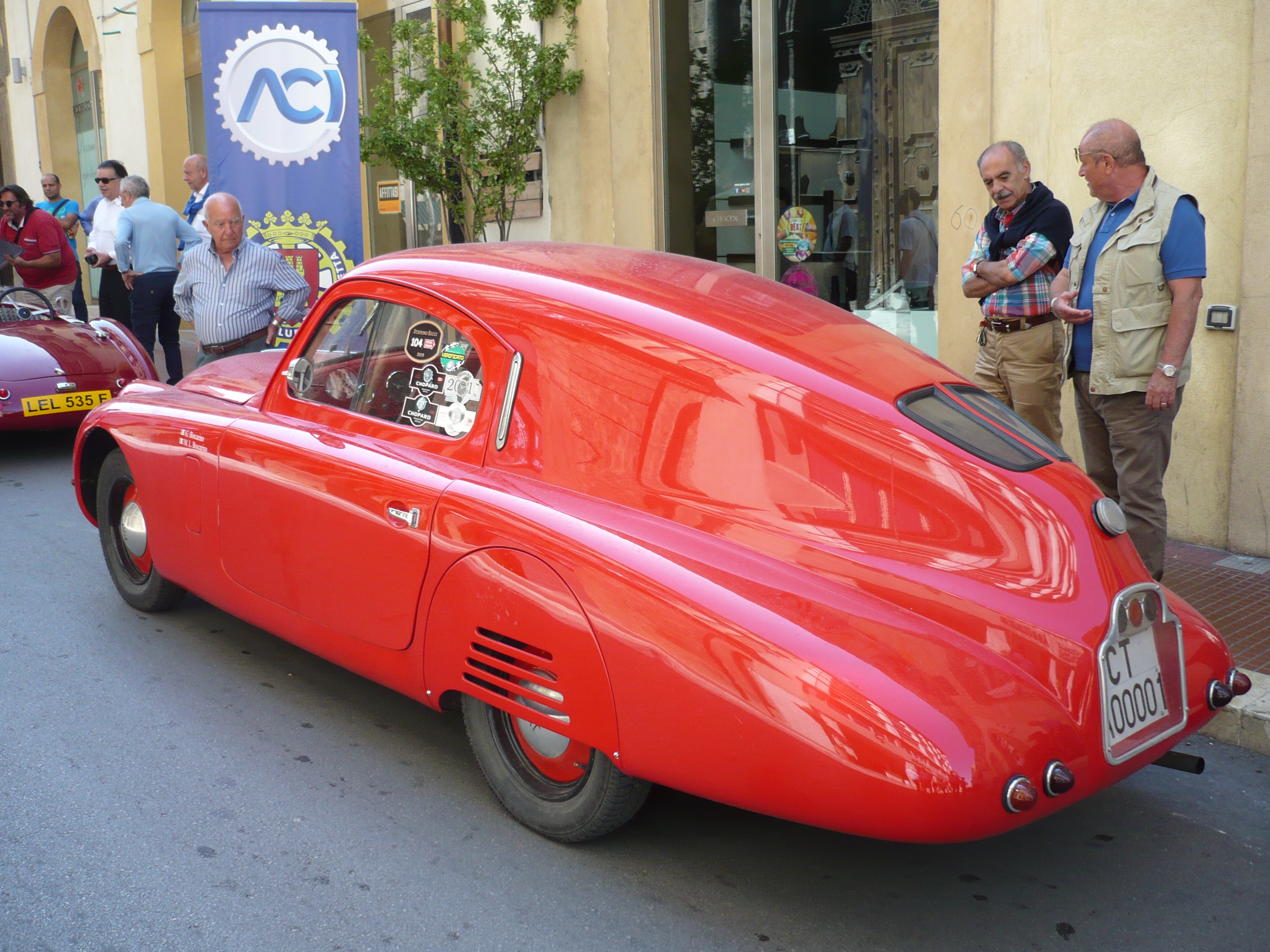
Rear view of a 508 C MM, 1939 version

The 1,089 cc engine had a larger Zenith 32 VIMB carburettor, a 7:1 compression ratio and other improvements; now coded 108 C M.M., it produced 42 PS (31 kW) at 4,400 rpm—up from 32 PS of the standard 508 C. Thanks to the aerodynamic, lightweight body and more powerful engine, top speed was 140 km/h (87 mph), remarkable for a 1.1-litre car of that size and weight.

For 1939 the body shape was further developed, changing the front end (now with a trilobate instead of hearth-shaped grille) and exaggerating the teardrop shape of the rear.

=== Fiat 1100 S ===
In the last years of the 1940s, Fiat also built a sports coupé, that took many styling details from the pre-war 508 C Mille Miglia. Yet this 1100 S of 1947 was clearly more modern. Mechanically it received upgrades like an oil cooler, centrifugal water pump and shell type bearings. The 1,089 cc engine delivered 51 PS (38 kW) at 5,200 rpm, allowing for a top speed of 150 km/h (93 mph). It debuted in the Mille Miglia in 1948 and finished 2nd, 3rd and 4th in the general classification. Until 1950, 401 examples of the 1100 S were made.

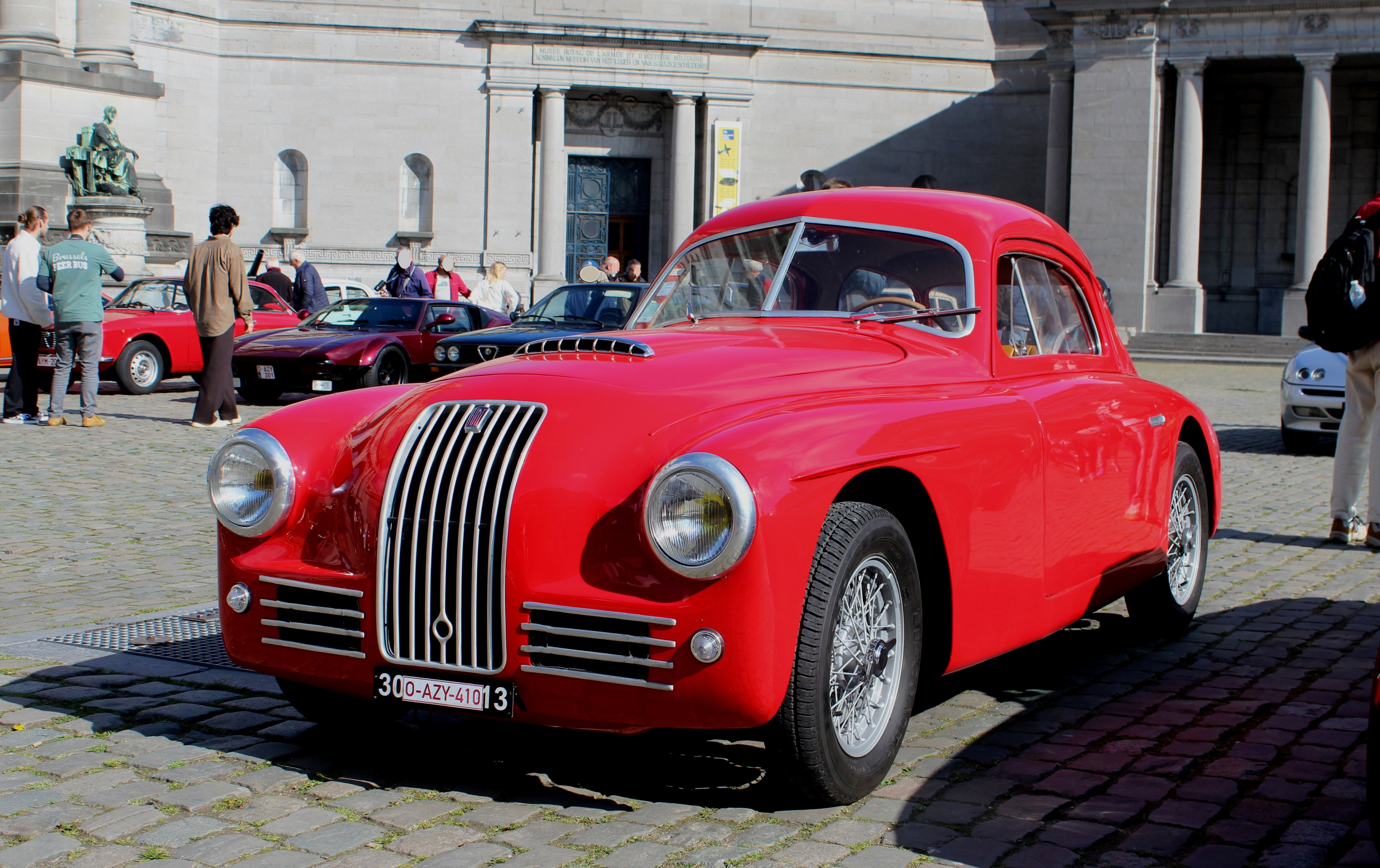
Fiat 1100 S

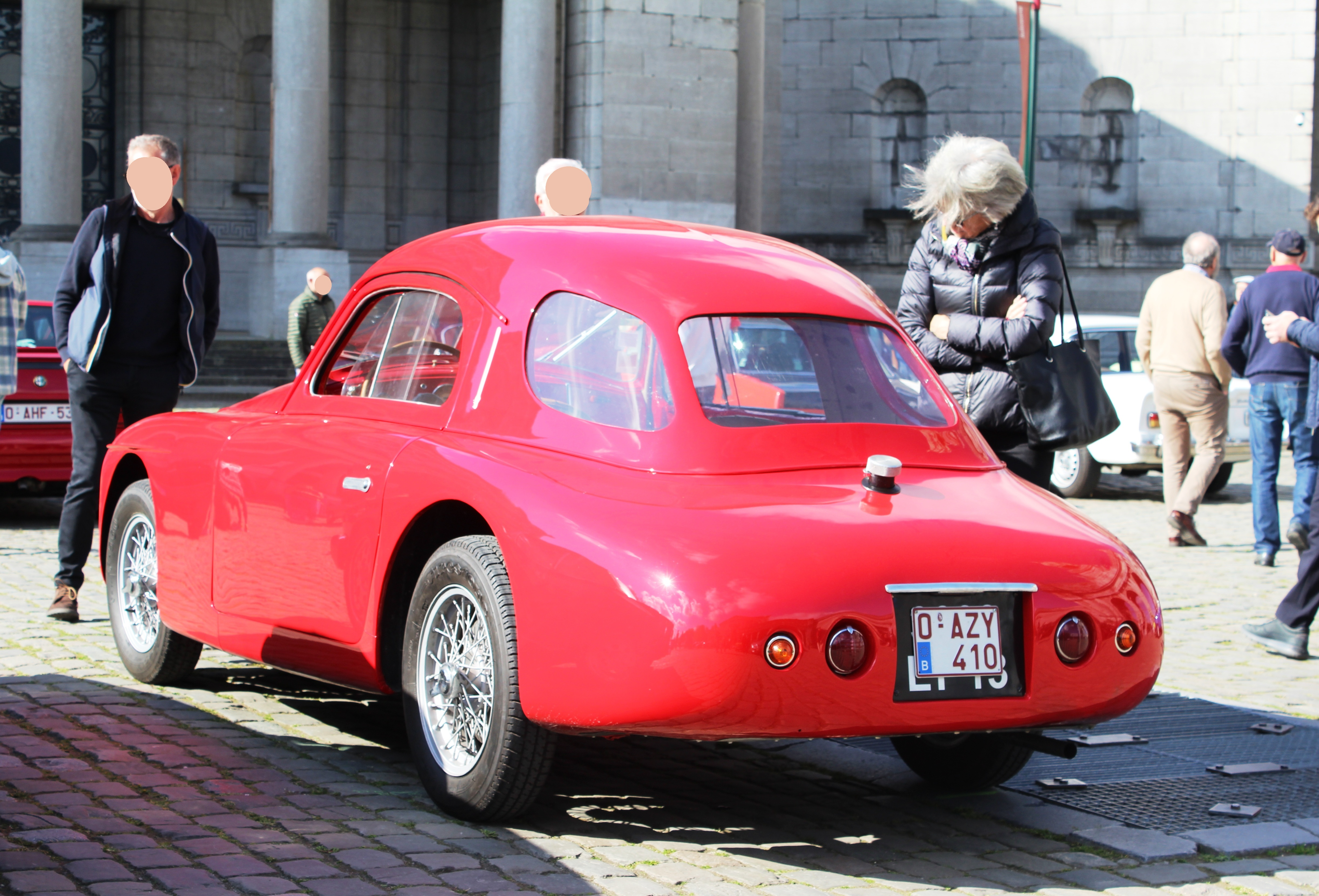
Fiat 1100 S
