= Dorothy Stanley-Turner =

British motor racing driver

Dorothy Mabel Murray Stanley-Turner (12 November 1916 – 8 July 1995) was a British motor racing driver who competed in sports car and rally events. She competed in the 1937 24 Hours of Le Mans and set a new woman's record at Shelsley Walsh Speed Hill Climb in a 2-litre Alta in 1939. Stanley-Turner served ten years in the Women's Auxiliary Air Force as an Assistant Section Officer.

== Biography ==
Stanley-Turner was born the only daughter among half-brothers on 12 November 1916 and was taught at a number of schools in England as well as overseas. This was because her father was a RAF Medical Services doctor during his foreign postings and her mother served in the Haslar Naval Hospital. Stanley-Turner did not take up feminine hobbies and raced cars at the amateur level from a young age and was taught to drive by her father and woman competition driver Joan Chetwynd. She for the most part drove MG Cars through her father being friends with some racing drivers as well as the MG Car Company managing director Cecil Kimber.

In 1937, Stanley-Turner competed in her first major race, the First Easter Mountain Handicap, at Brooklands in a J-type MG Midget car, and retired from the Rallye Paris – Saint-Raphaël Féminin. She entered the 1937 24 Hours of Le Mans with the British-based G. E. T. Eyston squad that fielded the No. 54 MG Midget PB car she shared with Joan Riddell. The duo finished sixteenth overall and fourth in the S1.1 class. Stanley-Turner, who was reported by the press to have competed at Le Mans with an injury she kept hidden from doctors so that she could race, was also second in the Biennial Cup event at the Donington Park road course. Ill health caused by diphtheria prevented her from competing in the 1938 24 Hours of Le Mans.

In 1938, Stanley-Turner finished sixth overall and third in the −1100 category at the Rallye Paris – Saint-Raphaël Féminin. She also took part in road races in Cork, Ireland in an MG car, where she was the eighth and final finishing driver. Stanley-Turner maintained her fitness by doing bell ringing that involves simultaneous exercise of the arms, diaphragm, legs and shoulders and was a member of the Oxford Diocesan Guild of Bell Ringers. She won the 1938 First Easter Road Handicap on an artificial road circuit designed by Malcolm Campbell at an average speed of 61.27 mph (98.60 km/h) in an MG vehicle, and also entered the Crystal Palace Plate, RAC Tourist Trophy (coming 22nd with Elsie Mary Wisdom) and the Imperial Plate, driving a MG Midget PB. In 1939, Stanley-Turner and other female drivers in Brighton collected funding for the British Motor Racing Fund to maintain the balance of power with Germany, Italy and the United Kingdom in international speed contests. That year saw her set a new woman's record held by Kay Petre at Shelsley Walsh Speed Hill Climb in a 2-litre Alta she borrowed from a factory and was inexperienced in how it operated in a time of 43.4 seconds set on her second run. Stanley-Turner had entered a small 937 cc British car in the 1939 RAC Tourist Trophy before the Second World War broke out.

On 3 August 1940, she was enlisted into the Women's Auxiliary Air Force as an Aircraftwoman 1st Class and was appointed an Assistant Section Officer, serving in a barrage balloon unit. Stanley-Turner was confirmed from a probationary role to a full Assistant Section Officer on 3 August 1941. She gave up her commission on 12 October 1950 and assumed a short service commission as Flying Officer WRAF five years on active list and four years on reserve, with seniority from 27 July 1947. Following the Second World War, Stanley-Turner was restricted to competing in the Coupe des Dames of the Monte Carlo Rally three times in the early 1950s, since it was hard for many drivers to return to motorsport and cars were difficult to acquire and those that were available were expensive. She was unable to compete in the Spa 24 Hours in 1948 due to illness that required her to undergo an operation. Stanley-Turner's Rallye Monte Carlo activities saw her drive a Alvis and achieve a career-best 32nd overall in the 1951 event.

== Personal life ==
She married Air Commodore Geoffrey Tindal-Carill-Worsley in 1951 after the two first met in 1941 and reunited five years later. The couple did not have any children. Stanley-Turner accompanied her husband to his postings in Far East Asia, acting as his hostess after she gave up her career. She died at home on 8 July 1995. Stanley-Turner's funeral took place at Church of St Nicholas, Combe St Nicholas on the afternoon of 14 July 1995 and was then cremated privately.

== Legacy ==
A circa 1938 gelatin silver print photograph taken by an unknown individual of Stanley-Turner sitting in a racing car was given to the National Portrait Gallery, London by Terence Pepper in 2014.

== 24 Hours of Le Mans results ==
| Year | Team | Co-Driver | Car | Class | Laps | Pos. | Class Pos. |
|---|---|---|---|---|---|---|---|
| 1937 | (United Kingdom) G. E. T. Eyston | (United Kingdom) Joan Riddell | MG PA Midget | 1.1 | 154 | 16th | 4th |
