= Greta Molander =

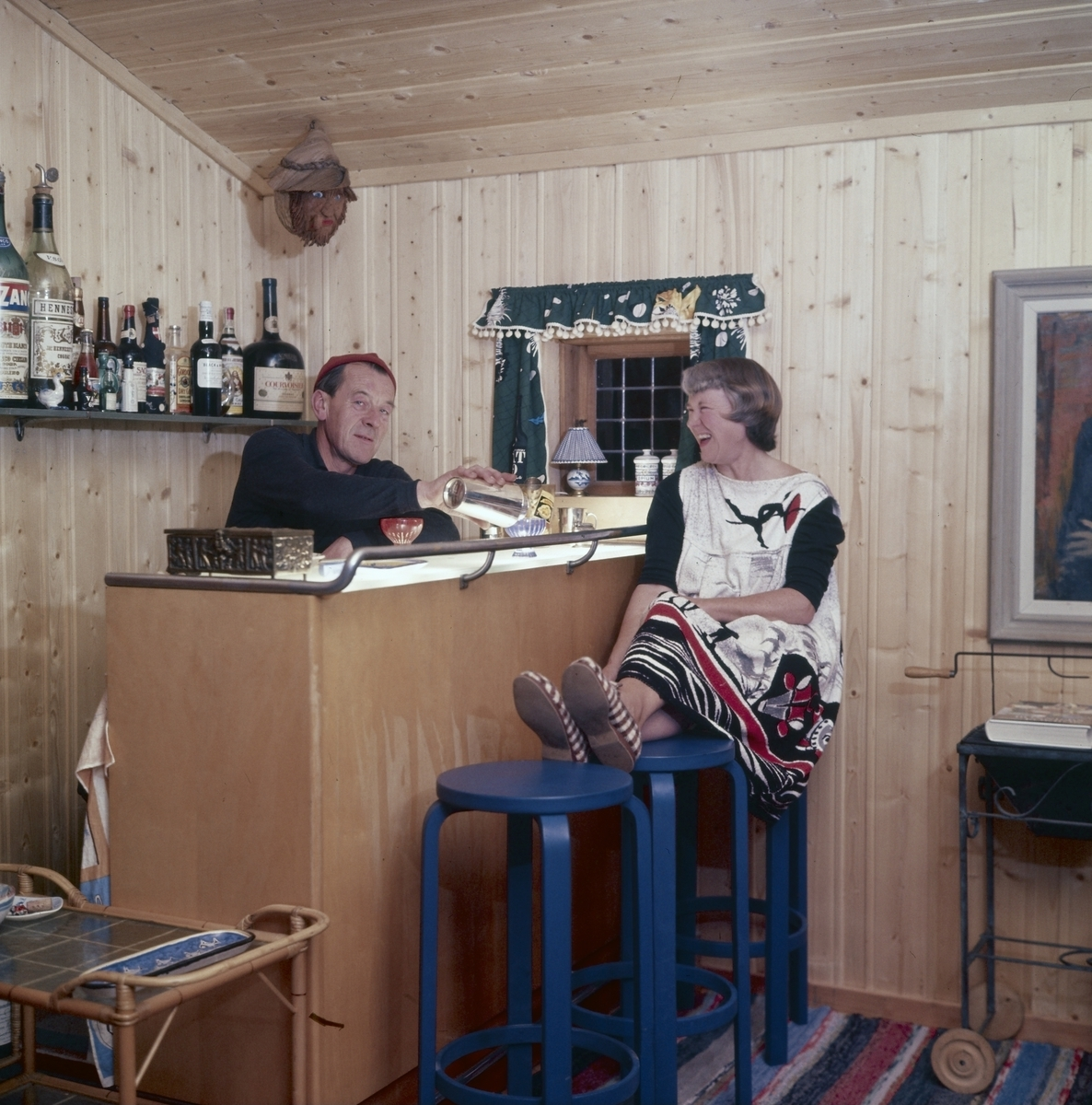
- Greta Molander in 1962
- Born: 23 August 1908; Ystad, Sweden
- Died: 20 March 2002 (aged 93); Sandefjord, Norway
- Occupation(s): Rally driver Writer

Greta Molander (23 August 1908 – 20 March 2002) was a Swedish/Norwegian rally driver and writer.

Molander entered her first rally in 1929. Her Monte Carlo Rally debut came in 1933, and she won the Coupes des Dames in 1937 and in 1952. She competed in the first European Rally Championship in 1953, where she won the women's class.

Molander was born in Ystad, and grew up in Nyköping and Stockholm. She married in 1938, and the couple settled in Sandefjord. She published several books from her travel expeditions, in the United States, Mexico, the African continent, and China.
