= Jean Laroche =

French poet (1921-2010)

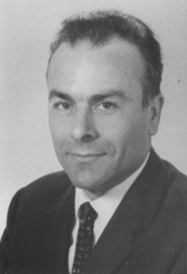
Jean Laroche, poète

Jean Laroche (1921–2010) was a French poet born in Nantes. He was also a professor and had 3 children.

== Published works ==
1950 : "L'éclat du ciel" Revue Moderne

1953 : "On n'oublie pas le jour" Editions Seghers

1953 : Obtention du prix René-Guy Cadou

1954 : "Mémoire d'été" Cahiers de Rochefort

1955 : "Passager de l'avril" Editions Chiffoleau avec des illustrations de Geneviève Couteau

1957 : "Ces mains vers l'aube" Editions Chiffoleau

1972 : "La musique est aveugle" Editions Traces

1972 : "Solitude de l'imaginaire" Editions Archipel sur des dessins de Cadou-Rocher

1975 : "Solaire-en-Bonnieux" Cahiers des Viviers du Vent en collaboration avec Robert Momeux, dessins de Françoise Laux

1976 : "Regard sur l'œil" Editions Archipel

1982 : "Impasses bleues" Editions Traces

1999 : "Le roncier de mémoire" Editions du Petit Véhicule

THE REVUES WHERE WE CAN FIND JEAN LAROCHE

Jean LAROCHE has worked with a lot of revues, like

1956 : "13 poètes du Pays Nantais" Académie Régence

1961 : "17 poètes du Pays Nantais" Académie Régence

Revues Océane, Phréatique, Traces, la Tour de Feu, Io, le Puits de l'Ermite...
