= Ernest Hiskins =

- Nationality: English
- Born: Ernest Norman Hiskins; 3 May 1918 Ross, Herefordshire
- Died: September 1972 (aged 54) Lichfield

Ernest Norman Hiskins (3 May 1918 - September 1972), a resident of Lichfield, Staffordshire, took part in the 1950 Monte Carlo Rally.

== Career ==
On 25 January 1950, Ernest, the owner of Midland Auto Electric Co. of Trent Valley Trading Estate, began the 1956-mile long journey from Glasgow to Monaco as he took part in the Monte Carlo Rally. He drove a Hillman Minx to 70th place. Ernest was also owner of Hiskins’ garage - Upper St John Street, Lichfield.
