= Peter Harper (racing driver) =

British racing driver (1921–2003)

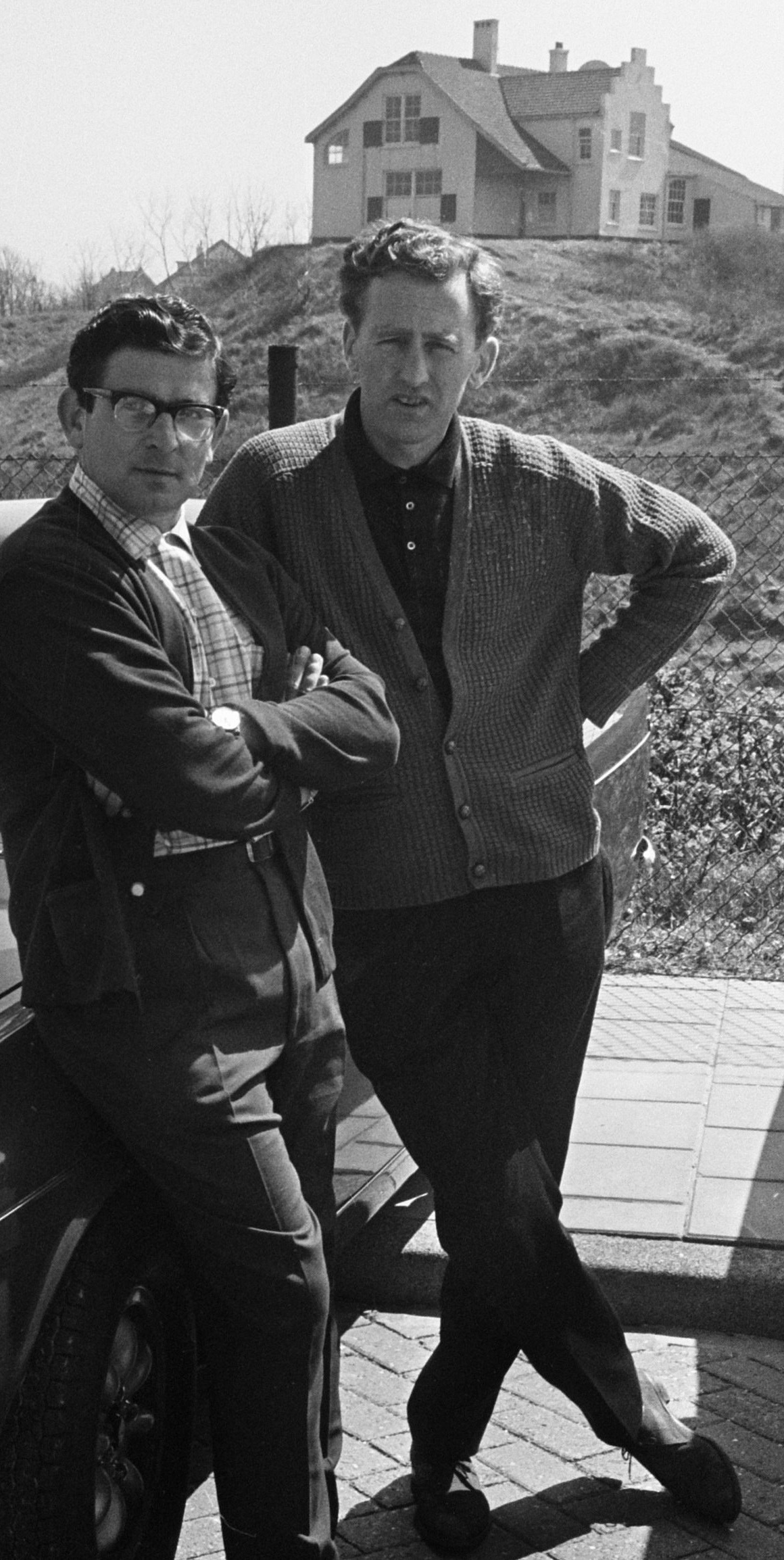
Peter Harper (right) with Robin Turvey in 1966

Peter Charles Edward Harper (25 November 1921 – 26 August 2003) was a British racing driver best known for his rally skills, especially on snow and ice. Harper competed mostly with cars from the Rootes Group, for whom he ran a number of motor dealerships based in Stevenage, Hertfordshire.

Harper served with the Royal Air Force during World War II. He started rallying in 1947 and was a regular class winner in the Monte Carlo Rally. In 1962 he finished as runner-up in the British Saloon Car Championship. Harper was elected to the British Racing Drivers' Club as a full member in 1994.

Harper was married twice. His first wife Mavis was his co-driver at his first Monte Carlo Rally in 1950. After she died of cancer, he married Priscilla in 1992.

Harper died in 2003, aged 81. He was survived by his second wife and a son and daughter from the first marriage.
