= Godfrey Imhof =

British racing driver (1911–1963)

Alfred Godfrey Imhof
- Nationality: (England) English
- Born: 6 May 1911; St Giles, London, England
- Died: 27 August 1963 (aged 52); Paddington, London, England

Alfred Godfrey Imhof (6 May 1911 – 27 August 1963) was a British racing driver in trials, rallies and hill climbing. He was the winner of the 2nd RAC Rally that was held in 1952, driving an Allard-Cadillac J2.

== Career ==
Before the war, he teamed up in trial with Ben Richardson and Michael Lawson, in the Candidi Provocatores trials team, on a 1936 LM Speed Model (chassis BBY 333).

In the immediate post-war period, he became an industrial designer at Allard and took part in the design of the K1 (two-seater), L1 (4-seater) models, and especially the competition J1, which he owned and competed Personally from 1946 to 1949.

He then became a London-based industrialist, owner of the Gramophone Company's recorder factory, built in Oxford Street in the 1950s.

== Family ==
His sister, Barbara Kathleen ("Betty"), married Major Arthur Frederick Frayling, OBE, chairman of the Hudson's Bay fur auction house in London and of the International Fur Trade Federation; their sons are Nicholas Frayling, Dean of Chichester from 2002 to 2014, and the educationalist and writer Sir Christopher Frayling.

== Rally results ==
Year	Rally	Car	Co-driver	Result
1952	RAC Rally	Allard-Cadillac J2	Betty Frayling	1st
1953	RAC Rally	Allard J2X	Betty Frayling	3rd
1955	RAC Rally	Allard-Cadillac J2	Ian Mackensie	3rd
