= Jowett Javelin =

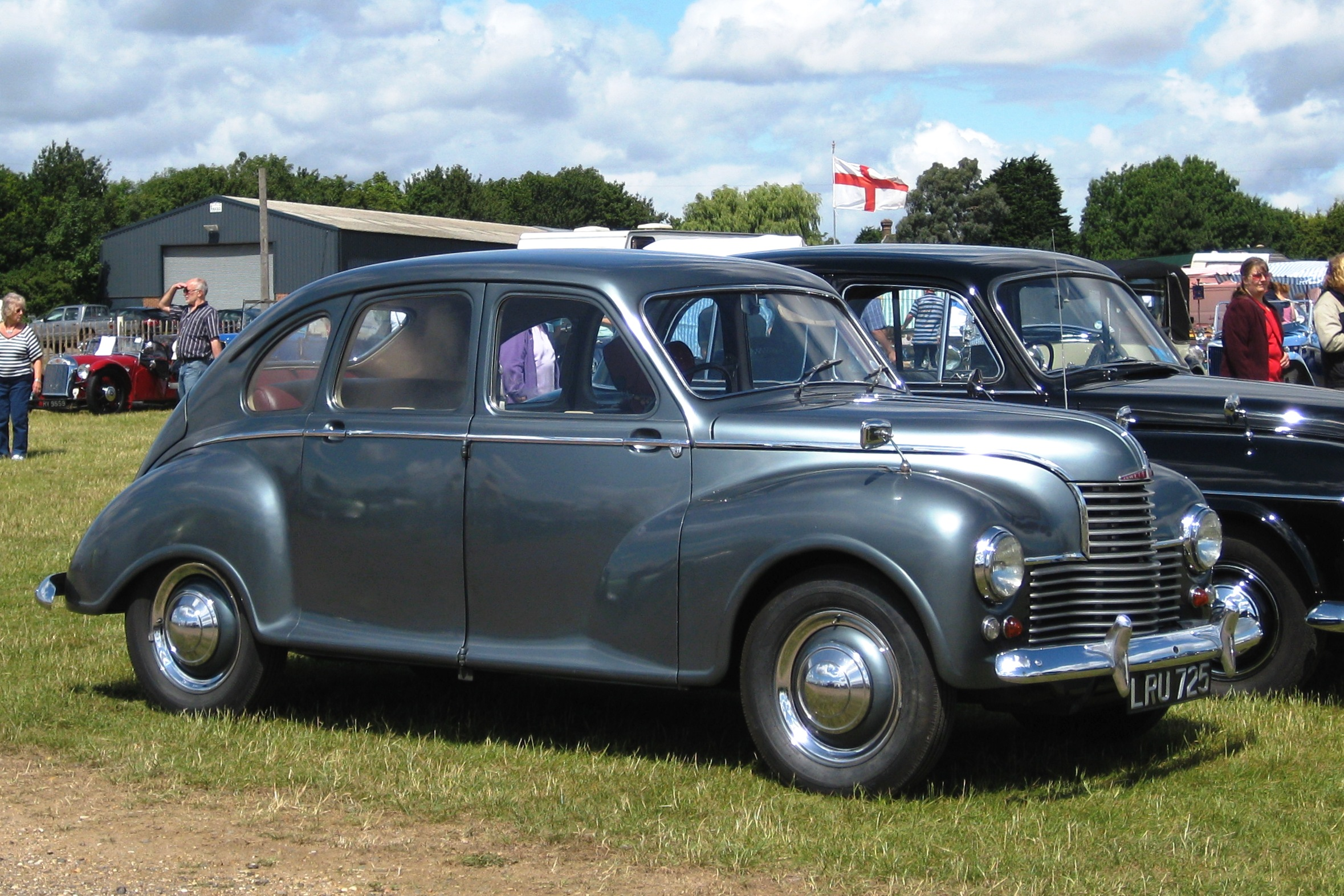
- Jowett Javelin

Overview
- Manufacturer: Jowett Cars Ltd
- Production: 1947–1953; 23,307 made
- Assembly: Great Britain; Australia
- Designer: Gerald Palmer

Body and chassis
- Class: Executive car (E)
- Body style: 4-door fastback saloon

Powertrain
- Engine: Jowett flat four, 1486 cc
- Transmission: 4-speed manual

Dimensions
- Wheelbase: 102 in (2,591 mm)
- Length: 168 in (4,267 mm)
- Width: 60 in (1,524 mm)
- Height: 61 in (1,549 mm)
- Curb weight: 2,120 lb (962 kg)

The Jowett Javelin is an executive car produced from 1947 to 1953 by Jowett Cars Ltd of Idle, near Bradford in England. The model went through five variants coded PA to PE. The designation changed to coincide with the London Motor Show in November but actually engineering design changes occurred frequently during the total production run, as and when required. The car was designed by Gerald Palmer during World War II and was intended to be a major leap forward from the relatively staid designs of pre-war Jowetts. Just over 23,000 units were produced.

== Introduction ==
The new Javelin, not yet in full production, made its first public appearance on Saturday 27 July 1946 in a cavalcade to celebrate 60 years of the British Motor Industry organised by the SMMT. Started by the King in Regent's Park the cavalcade passed through Marble Arch around London's West End and Piccadilly Circus and back up to Regent's Park. Series production was not fully under way until November 1947.

In a 1949 road test report, The Times' correspondent welcomed the Javelin's good performance and original design. They reported that the engine mounted ahead of the front axle briskly accelerates (to nearly 80 mph) a body which could carry six persons. The moderate size of the engine, the car's light weight and good streamlining all contribute to its excellent performance. Controls were all light to operate and it was a restful car to drive.

== Powertrain ==
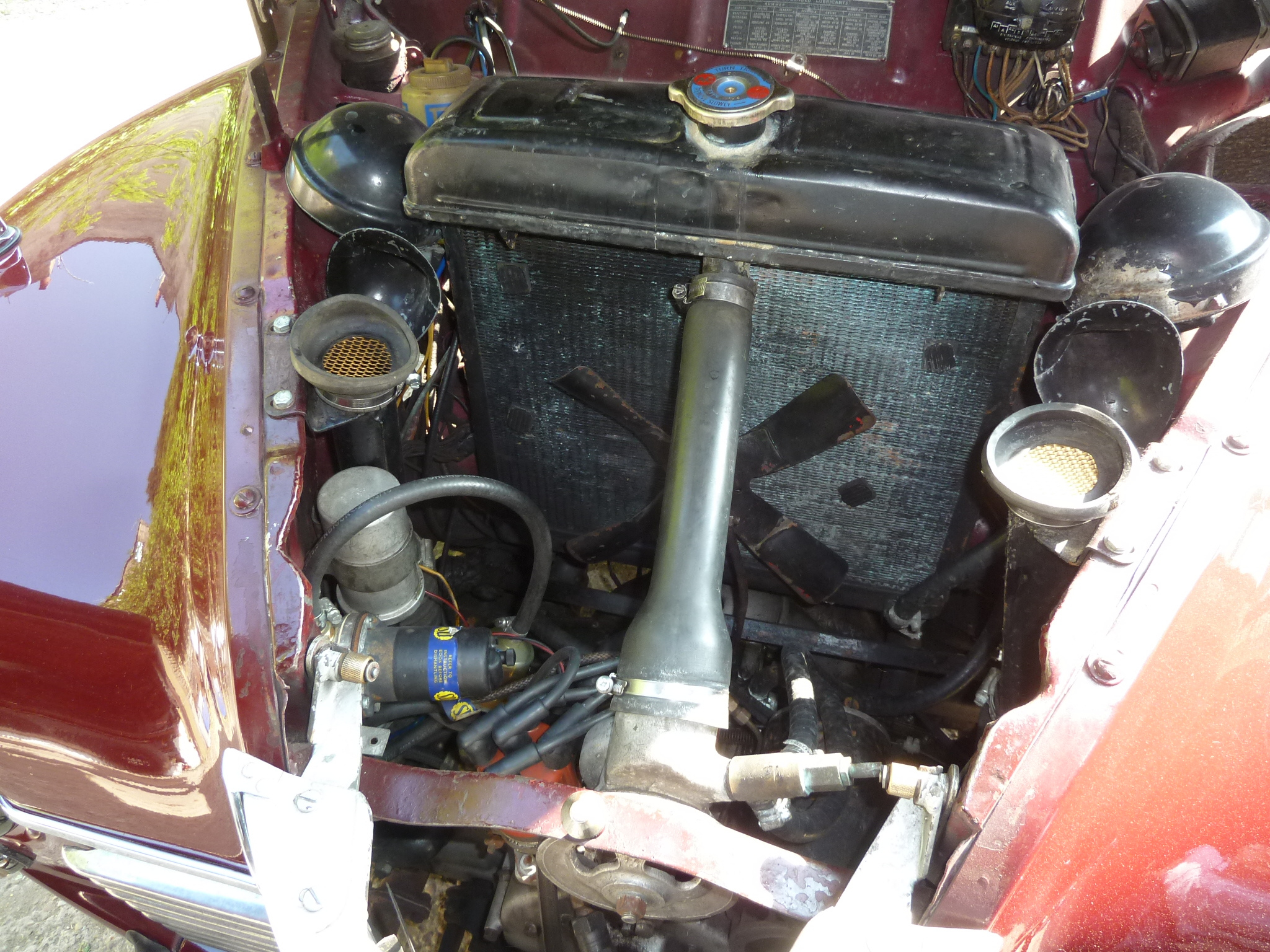
The horizontally opposed engine is very low immediately behind the grille and in front of the radiator

The flat four overhead valve engine of 1486 cc with a compression ratio of 7.2:1 was water-cooled and had an aluminium block and wet cylinder liners. It developed 50 bhp (37 kW) at 4100 rpm (52.5 bhp in the case of the PE) giving the car a maximum speed of 77 mph (124 km/h) and a 0-50 mph (80 km/h) time of 13.4 seconds. Two Zenith carburettors were fitted and PA and PB versions had hydraulic tappets. The radiator was behind the engine. A four-speed gearbox with column change was used. Early cars had gearboxes made by the Henry Meadows company. Later, Jowett made the gearboxes, but the decision to make the gearboxes in-house proved to be a costly mistake. Even though Jowett had some experience in transmission manufacturing, the project went disastrously wrong; powertrainless bodies stacked up in the assembly line because of problems in gearbox production.

== Design features ==
Design features included aerodynamic styling with the headlights faired into the wings and, for the time, a steeply sloped, curved windscreen, a first for a British production car. The body was of pressed steel, incorporating a box-section chassis, and was made for Jowett by Briggs Motor Bodies in their Doncaster factory. The suspension used torsion-bars on all wheels (independent at the front) and internal rack-and-pinion steering. PA and PB models had mixed Girling hydraulic brakes at the front and mechanical braking at the rear. Later versions were fully hydraulic. The PA was available in only one version although cloth or leather seats were an option. The PB was available with a "de luxe" option with leather seats and walnut dashboard among other improvements. The "standard" car was simplified, retaining the metal dashboard from the PA series and basic vinyl seats were introduced. The two-tier model range was continued until the end of production.

== Gallery ==
1950 Jowett Javelin DeLuxe

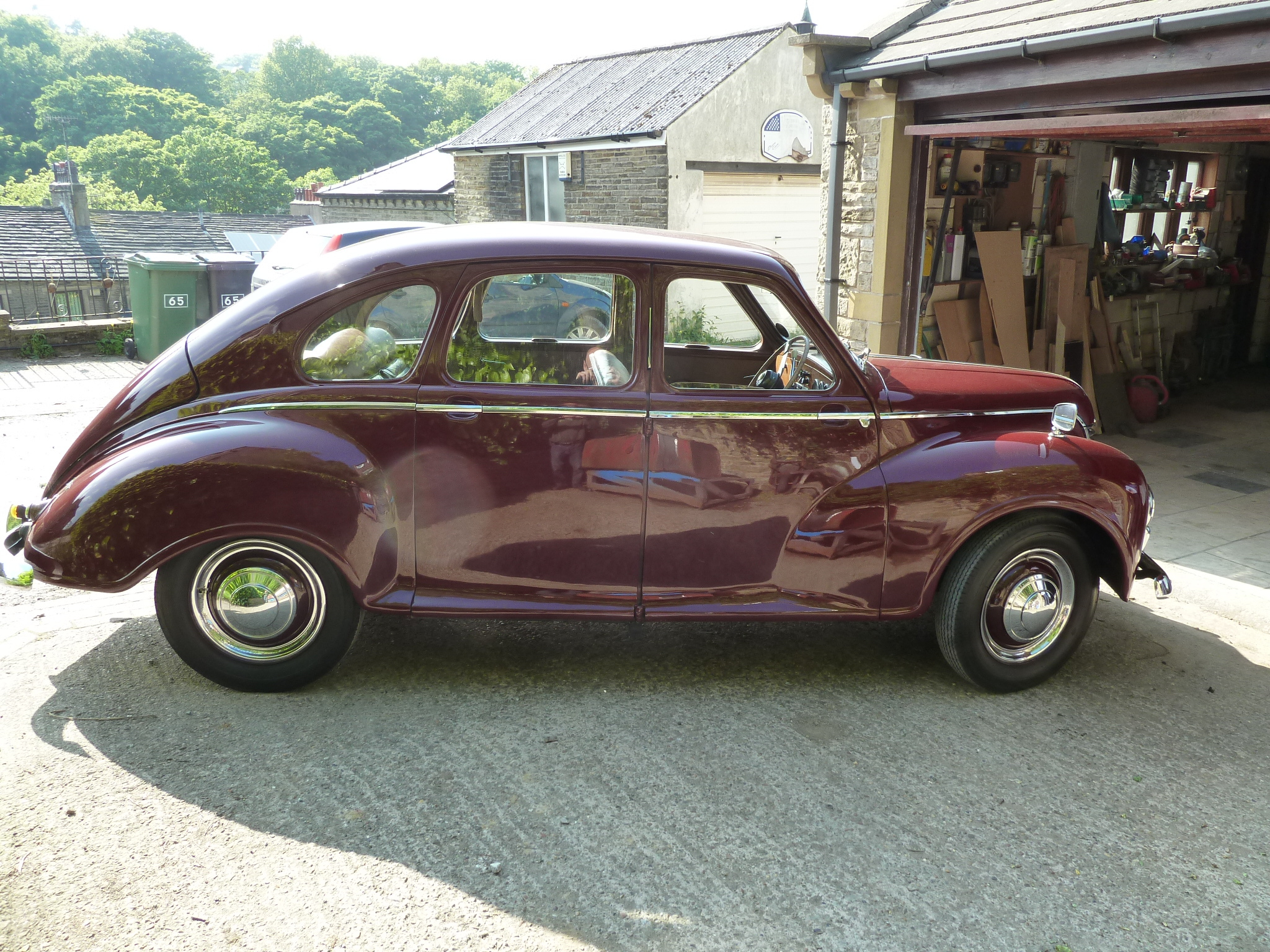
1952 Jowett Javelin

1952 Jowett Javelin

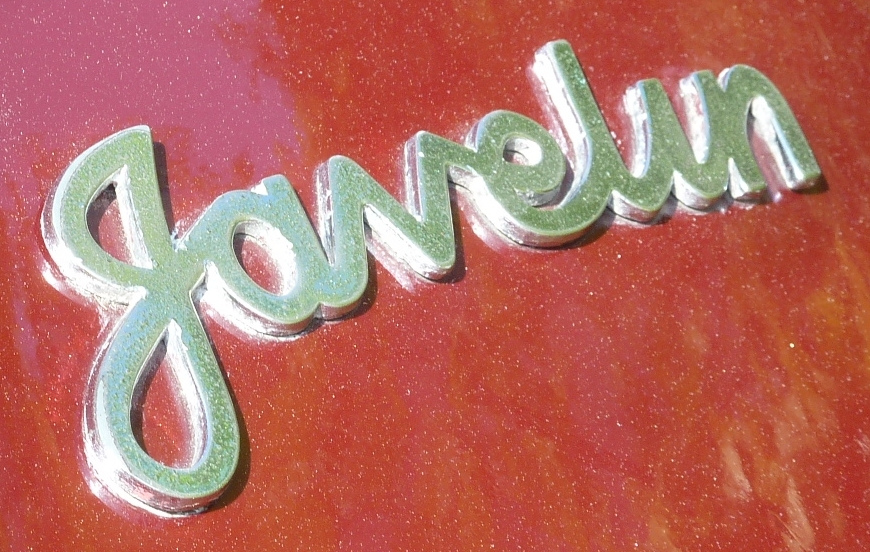
Javelin badge

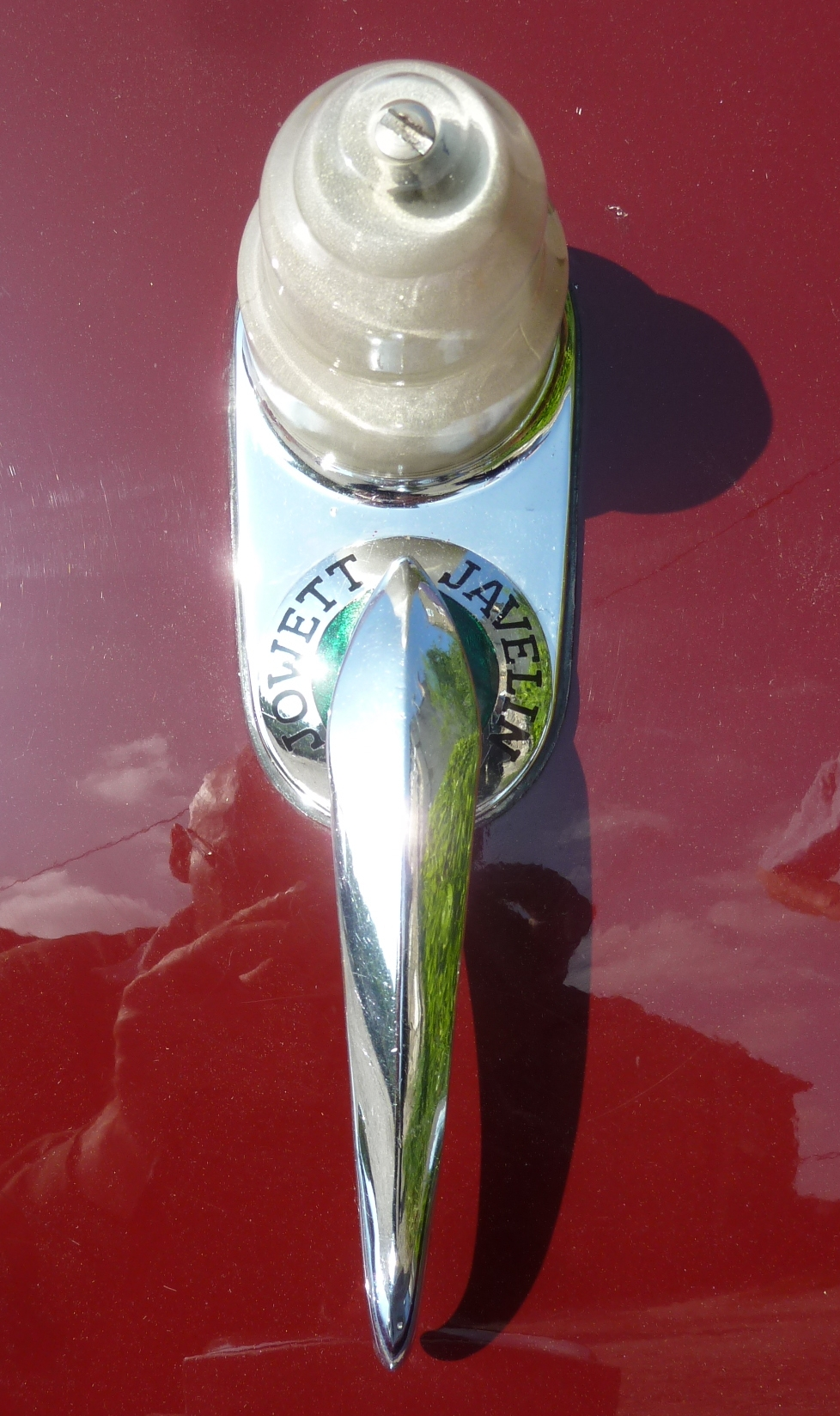
Boot lid handle

== Dimensions ==
The car had a wheelbase of 102 in (2,591 mm) and a track of 51 in (1,295 mm). Overall, the car was 14 ft (4.3 m) long, 5 ft (1.5 m) wide and weighed about 1 tonne depending on model and year. The car was expensive, costing £819 at launch. The Jowett was competing against cars such as the Jaguar 1½ litre (£953), Lanchester LD10 (£927), Riley RM 1½ litre (£863) and the Singer Super 12 (£768).

== Performance ==
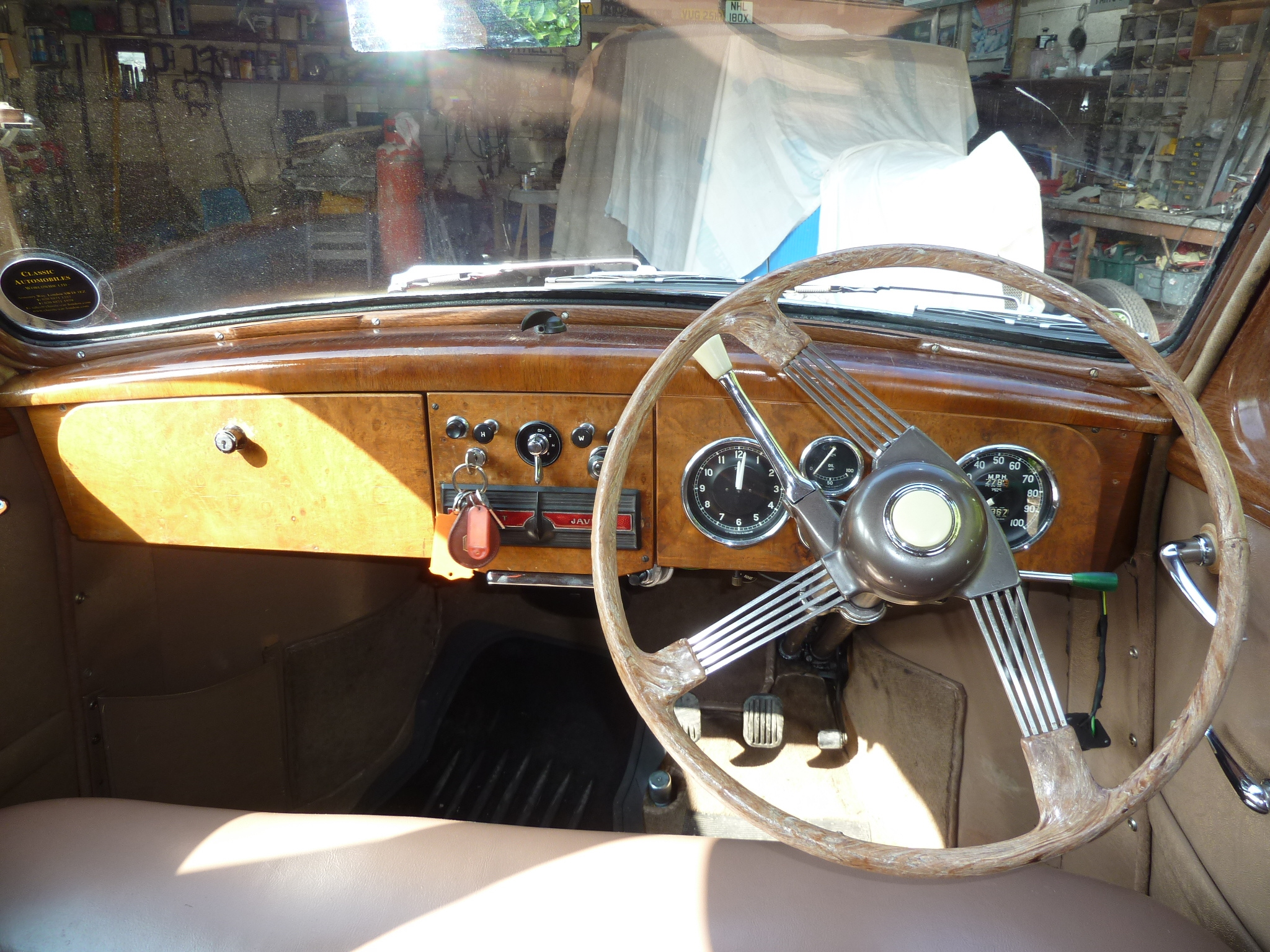
Interior

A de-luxe saloon version tested by The Motor magazine in 1953 had a top speed of 82.4 mph (132.6 km/h) and could accelerate from 0-60 mph (97 km/h) in 20.9 seconds. A fuel consumption of 29.1 miles per imperial gallon (9.7 L/100 km; 24.2 mpg_{‑US}) was recorded. The test car cost £1207 including taxes.

== Sporting achievements ==
An early example won the 1.5-litre class at the 1949 Monte Carlo Rally, and another won the 2-litre touring-car class at the Spa 24-hour race in the same year. In the 1952 International RAC Rally, a Javelin again won its class and also took the "Best Closed Car" award. A privately entered Javelin won the 1953 International Tulip Rally outright.
