= Jean Trévoux =

French racing driver (1905–1981)

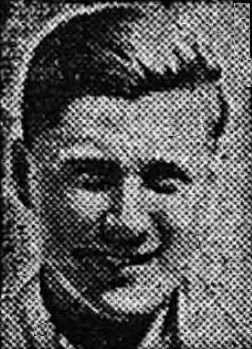
- Trévoux in 1939
- Born: Jean Claudius Marie Trévoux; 27 February 1905 Le Petit-Quevilly, Seine-Inférieure, France
- Died: 29 October 1981 (aged 76) Mexico City, Mexico

24 Hours of Le Mans career
- Years: 1932–1935, 1937–1939, 1949
- Teams: privateer, Écurie Eudel, Ecurie Francia, Gordini
- Best finish: 7th (1935)
- Class wins: 0

Jean Claudius Marie Trévoux (February 27, 1905 – October 29, 1981) was a French racing driver, and winner of four editions of the Monte Carlo Rally.

== Biography ==
Born in Le Petit-Quevilly, Trévoux began his racing career in early 1932 driving a Bugatti and winning the Criterium Paris to Nice race. He also drove a Bentley Blower at the Le Mans 24 Hours that year but crashed out on the first lap.

In 1934, Trévoux took the first of his four wins at Monte-Carlo, as co-driver to Louis Gas. In 1939, he took a joint win with Joseph Paul. After racing returned following World War II, he claimed two other wins, driving a Hotchkiss and Delahaye 175 respectively.

Trévoux competed in the Rallye du Maroc in 1935 and 1937, and the Criterium International de Tourisme Paris-Nice in 1934. In 1941, he attempted to qualify for the Indianapolis 500.

Trévoux later settled in Mexico during the late 1940s, marrying a Mexican woman and opening a restaurant in Mexico City called Restaurant Bar La Cucaracha.
