= Simca 8 =

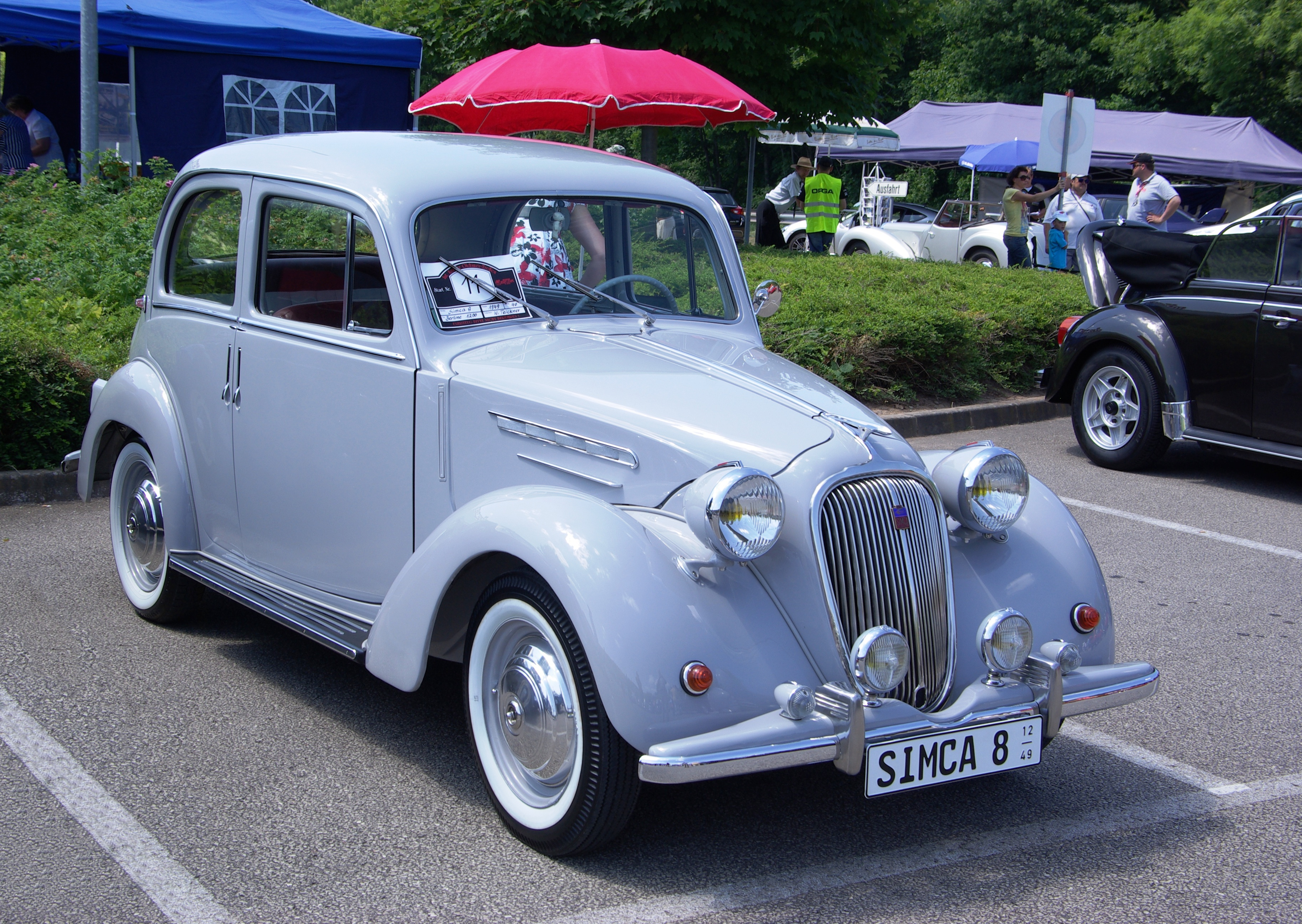
- 1949 Simca 8/1200 4-door saloon

Overview
- Manufacturer: Simca
- Production: 1937–1951
- Assembly: France: Nanterre

Body and chassis
- Class: Large family car (D)
- Body style: 2-door saloon 4-door saloon 2-door coupé 2-door cabriolet 3-door estate (from 1948)
- Layout: FR layout
- Related: Fiat 508C/1100 "Nuova Balilla"

Powertrain
- Engine: 1,089 cc I4; 1,221 cc I4
- Transmission: 4-speed manual with synchromesh on top 2 ratios

Dimensions
- Wheelbase: 2,420 mm (95.3 in)
- Length: 4,000 mm (157.5 in)
- Width: 1,480 mm (58.3 in)
- Height: 1,530 mm (60.2 in)

Chronology
- Successor: Simca Aronde

The Simca 8 is a small family car built by Simca and sold in France between November 1937 and 1951 (including wartime), available as a saloon, coupé or cabriolet. It was a rebadged Fiat 508C "nuova Balilla" made at Fiat's Simca plant in Nanterre, France.

== History ==
The Simca 8 was first presented, at the Paris Motor Show in October 1937, and sales in France started almost immediately in November. Early the next summer Henri Pigozzi, Simca's energetic boss, organised a three part endurance run under the supervision of the ACF. A single Simca 8 undertook a "non-stop" 50,000 kilometer (31,075 miles) run split as follows:

- 10,000 kilometers (6,215 miles) lapping the Montlhéry circuit averaging 115.1 km/h (72 mph) and returning 7.9 L/100 km
- 20,000 kilometers (12,430 miles) on open roads averaging 65 km/h (40 mph) and consuming 6.0 L/100 km
- 20,000 kilometers (12,430 miles) in Paris averaging (impressively) 54 km/h (34 mph) and consuming 6.5 L/100 km

The initial 10,000 km round the race-circuit south of Paris involved breaking no fewer than 8 international records, although the manufacturer's advertisement including this information does not spell out what these records were. The purpose of the exercise was, of course, to gain positive publicity for the Simca 8, and as soon as the 50,000 kilometers had been completed, on 12 May 1938, a press dinner was organised at which the journalists were able to dine with the drivers, the ACF monitors, and the Simca directors as well as representatives from Shell and Dunlop, whose products had presumably played a key role in the exercise.

The printed summary of the event, used to advertise to the wider public, concluded with an invitation that the reader "achetez la même voiture" (buy the same car).

The Simca 8 won plaudits for its lively temperament and excellent fuel economy. The four ratios on the new gear box were chosen so that even when cruising at 110 km/h (68 mph) fuel consumption remained reasonable, and set to permit good progress along country roads and reasonable acceleration even in hilly areas. The car also came with unusually precise steering and efficient hydraulically controlled brakes that did not overheat.

Commentators nevertheless noted that the engine was noisy when working hard, the (semaphore style) direction indicators were fragile, and the ambitiously sophisticated front suspension also proved fragile when confronted with France's rural roads, many of which were still unpaved. The gear box could be disagreeable when changing down across the gate from third speed to second, and the car was only just large enough for four people, with only a small storage area for luggage, located in a hard to get at position behind the back seat and without any external access.

== Drivetrain ==
The '8' in the car's name did not indicate an eight-cylinder engine; it had but four cylinders, and was officially rated as a 6CV vehicle for tax purposes. The eight most likely signifies 1938, the car's first model year. At launch, the car featured Fiat's 1,089 cc engine with a claimed output of 32 PS (24 kW) at 4,000 rpm. Fuel feed came via a Solex 30 mm carburetor and overhead valves driven, using rods and rocker arms, by a side-mounted camshaft. An unusual feature at the time was the use of aluminium for the cylinder head.

In September 1949, not long before being replaced in 1951, the Simca 8 acquired the Fiat designed, 1,221 cc engine which would also be employed for its successor, the Simca 9 Aronde. Sold as the Simca 8/1200, this model develops 41 PS (30 kW) and received a redesigned front end.

== Bodywork ==
At launch only two bodies were offered, these being a 4-door "berline" (saloon/sedan) and a 2-door cabriolet. This contrasted with the Simca's Italian cousin for which a wider range of bodies was available from the start and it also marked a departure from the strategy followed by Simca themselves with the predecessor model, the Simca-Fiat 6CV which had been offered with almost as wide a range of body variants as its Turin built relative. The 4-door saloon body was unusual in that there was no central pillar between the front doors, hinged at the front, and the rear doors, hinged at the back, permitting particularly easy access when a front and rear door were opened simultaneously. In 1937 the Simca 8 4-door Berline was priced at 23,900 Francs for a "Normale" version and at 25,900 Francs for a "Grande Luxe". The Peugeot 202 made its debut only six months later, in Spring 1938, and was priced at 21,300 Francs for a "Normale" version and at 22,500 Francs for a "Luxe". The cars were similar in size and power, but sales data suggest that the market found space for both of them, despite the Simca's higher price.

The post war range became wider, with coupé, cabriolet, and after 1948 estate versions listed, but these were all substantially more expensive than the berline: virtually all the cars sold were still Berlines, which early in 1947 were priced at 330,000 francs against 420,000 francs for the cabriolet. Peugeot's slightly larger but also slower competitor, the 202, was priced at 303,600 francs, including a sunroof.)

In 1949, along with the engine upgrade, the Simca 8 underwent some grille revisions, and other minor upgrades.

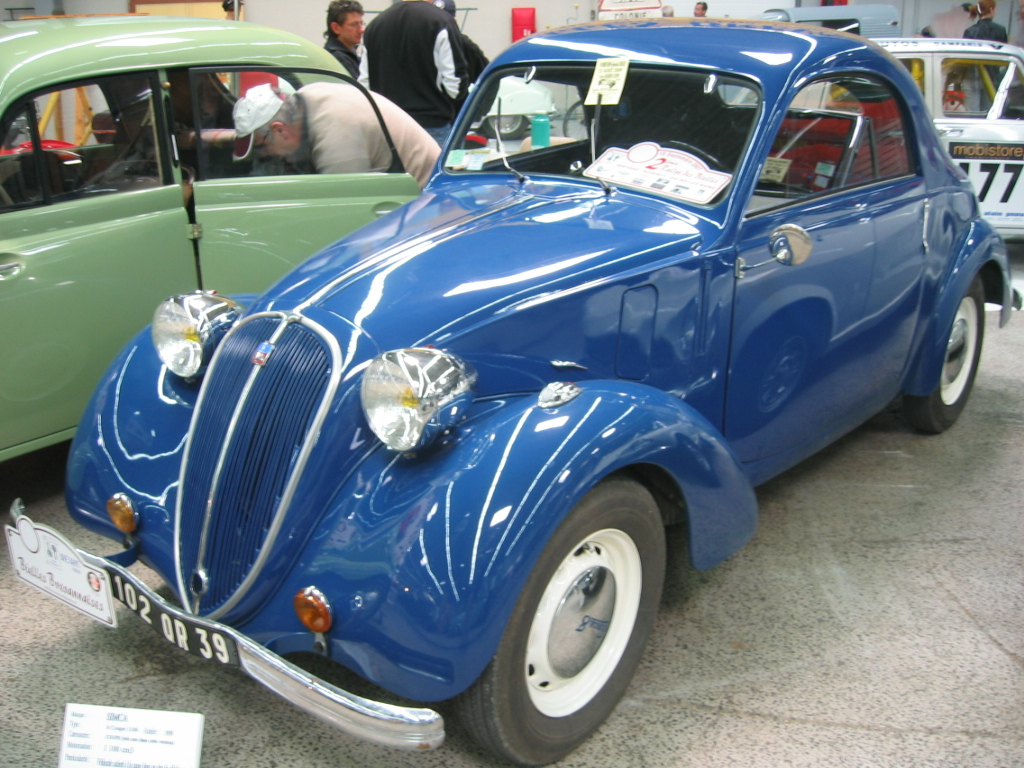
Simca 8 coupé deux places (2-seat coupé)

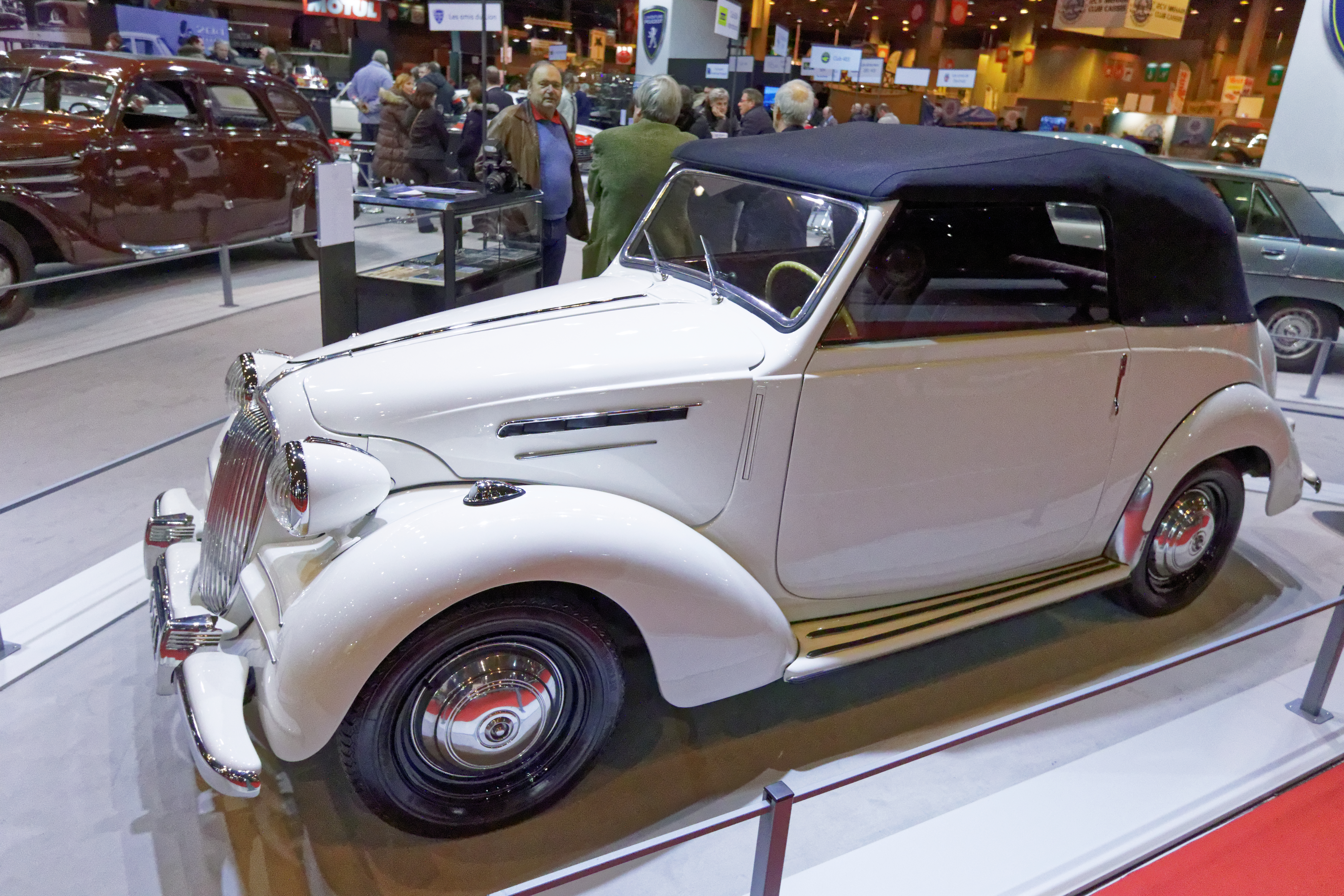
1950 Simca 8/1200 Cabriolet

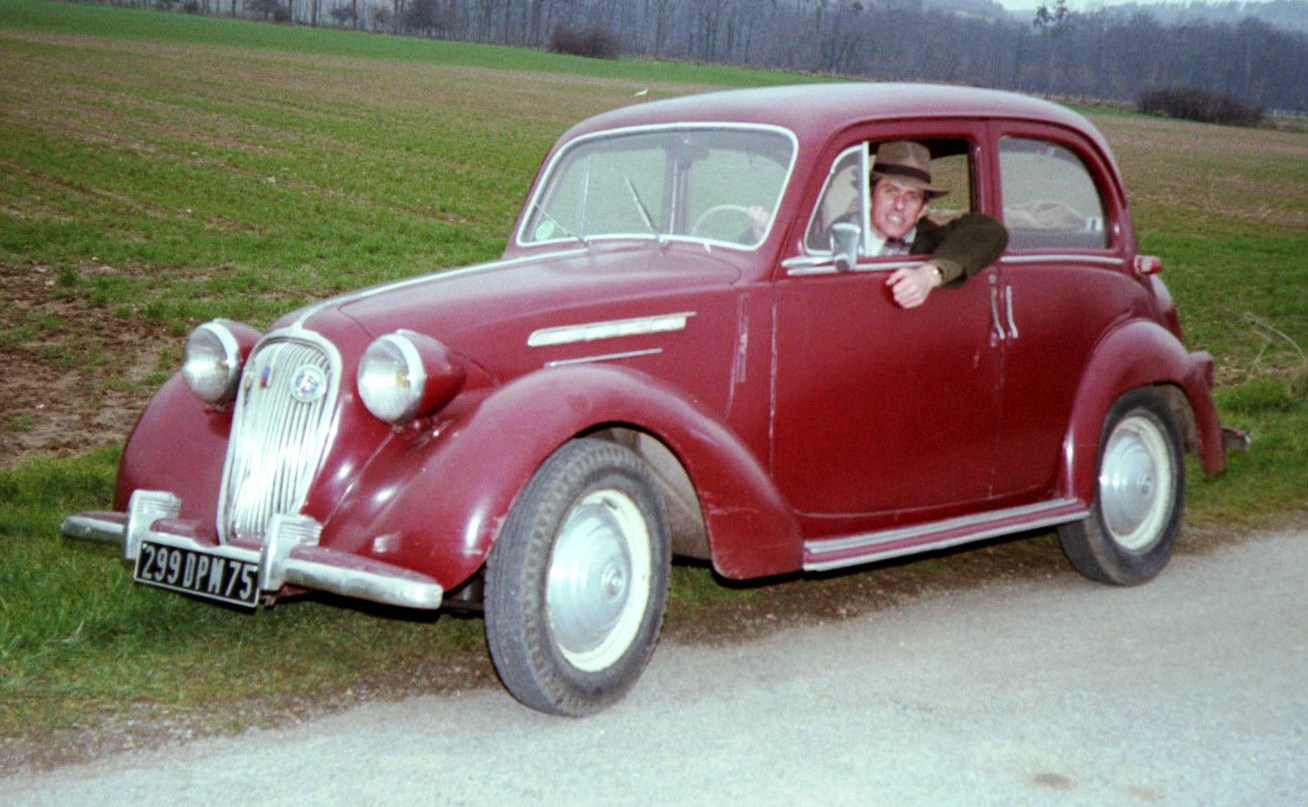
Simca 8/1200 4-door saloon

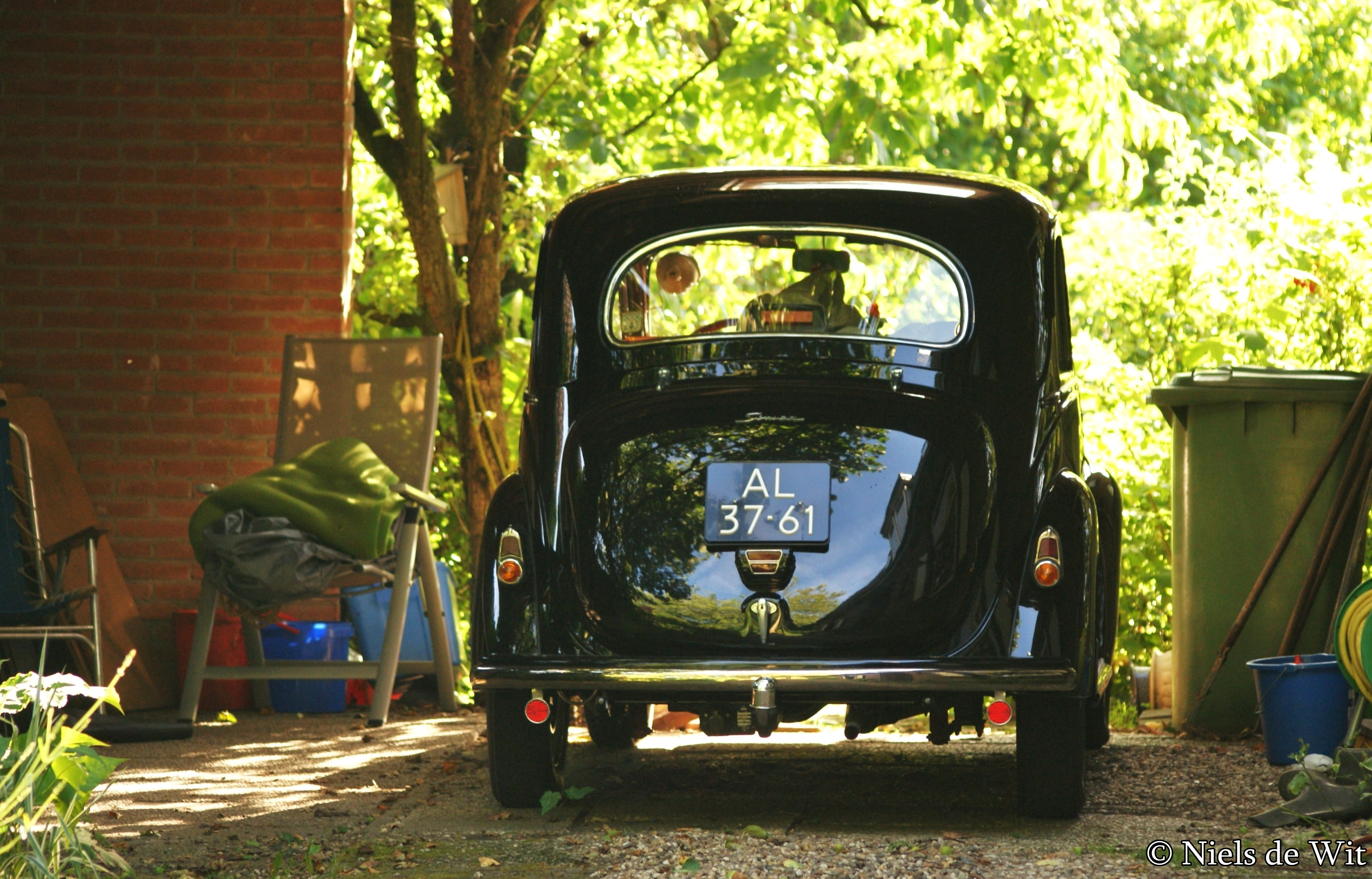
Late Simca 8/1200 saloon (rear view)

== Commercial ==
For most of the time the Simca 8's principal competitors were the "bargain basement" Renault Juvaquatre and the Peugeot 202. After the war, with the Juvaquatre range restricted to an estate version, and Peugeot moving half a market segment up at the end of 1948 replacing the Peugeot 202 with the larger 203, sales of the Simca 8 held up impressively even though the car was by now clearly nearing the end of its production run. In 1948 the Simca 8 was Simca's top seller, with approximately 14,000 sold; almost all of them were saloons. Two years later, in its penultimate year, the car was being produced at an even higher rate.

The principal complication arose from the fact that the car was in most respects a badge engineered Fiat, which compromised its export potential, which was a particular issue after the war, when government (and the state of the French economy) were demanding heroic export effort from France's leading auto-makers.

The French car market in the early 1950s was concentrated, with just three models between them accounting for two thirds of domestic sales in 1950. Nevertheless, as the fourth best selling car of 1950 the Simca 8 with unit sales of 17,705 in that year achieved a respectable 10.2% market share. In total, 112,363 examples were built over its 14-year production run, straddling the World War.

== Sources and further reading ==
- This entry incorporates information the French Wikipedia and Italian Wikipedia corresponding entries.
- This entry includes statistical information from the French Wikipedia entry concerning the French car market in 1950.
