= 1949 Internationale Tulpenrallye =

Rally competition in the Netherlands

1949 Internationale Tulpenrallye: 1. Internationale Tulpenrallye
Next event →
- Host country: NED
- Dates run: 26 – 30 April 1949

Overall results
- Overall winner: (United Kingdom) Ken Wharton (United Kingdom) Joy Cooke; Ford Anglia

The 1949 Internationale Tulpenrallye was the 1st Internationale Tulpenrallye. It was won by Ken Wharton.

== Results ==
| Pos. | No. | Driver | Car | Class | Points | Start City |
|---|---|---|---|---|---|---|
| 1 | 139 | (United Kingdom) Ken Wharton | Ford Anglia | 2 | 441.3 | Den Haag |
| 2 | 4 | (United Kingdom) Ian Appleyard | Jaguar | 1 | 435.7 | London |
| 3 | 143 | (Netherlands) Dries van der Lof | Fiat 500 | 4 | 431.2 | Den Haag |
| 4 | 8 | (United Kingdom) R. Th. Haddow | MG | 2 | 430.6 | Glasgow |
| 5 | 47 | (Netherlands) H. J. C. de Rijk | Ford 1940 | 1 | 430.1 | Rome |
| 6 | 133 | Madame M. Trouis | Simca 6 | 4 | 427.7 | Den Haag |
| 7 | 140 | (United Kingdom) J. C. Warning | Skoda 1101 | 3 | 427.2 | Den Haag |
| 8 | 44 | B. H. Eerlich | Fiat 500 | 4 | 425.9 | Rome |
| 9 | 152 | (Netherlands) B. L. van den Wansem | Austin A40 | 2 | 425.3 | Den Haag |
| 10 | 151 | (Netherlands) G.L.v.d.Wansem | Austin A40 | | | Den Haag |
| 11 | 146 | (Netherlands) H.J.Voormolen | Fiat 1000 | 3 | 422.0 | Den Haag |
