= 1950 Internationale Tulpenrallye =

1949 Internationale Tulpenrallye: 2. Internationale Tulpenrallye
← Previous event	Next event →
- Host country: NED
- Dates run: 26 – 30 April 1949

Overall results
- Overall winner: (United Kingdom) Ken Wharton (Netherlands) J.J.Langelaan (United Kingdom) J. Dorsett; Ford V8 Pilot

The 1950 Internationale Tulpenrallye was the 2nd Internationale Tulpenrallye. It was won again by Ken Wharton.

== Results ==
Pos.	No.	Driver	Car	Points	Start City
1	202	(United Kingdom) Ken Wharton	Ford V8 Pilot	43598	Den Haag
2	285	(Netherlands) K. S. Barendregt	Ford V8 Pilot	45296	Den Haag
3	240	(Netherlands) J. K. Kuiper	Citroën	46068	Den Haag
4	189	(Netherlands) H. A. H. Sijthoff	Healey	46943	Den Haag
5	229	(Netherlands) L. P. Kabel	Citroën	47458	Den Haag
