= Ford Thames 400E =

Thames 400E
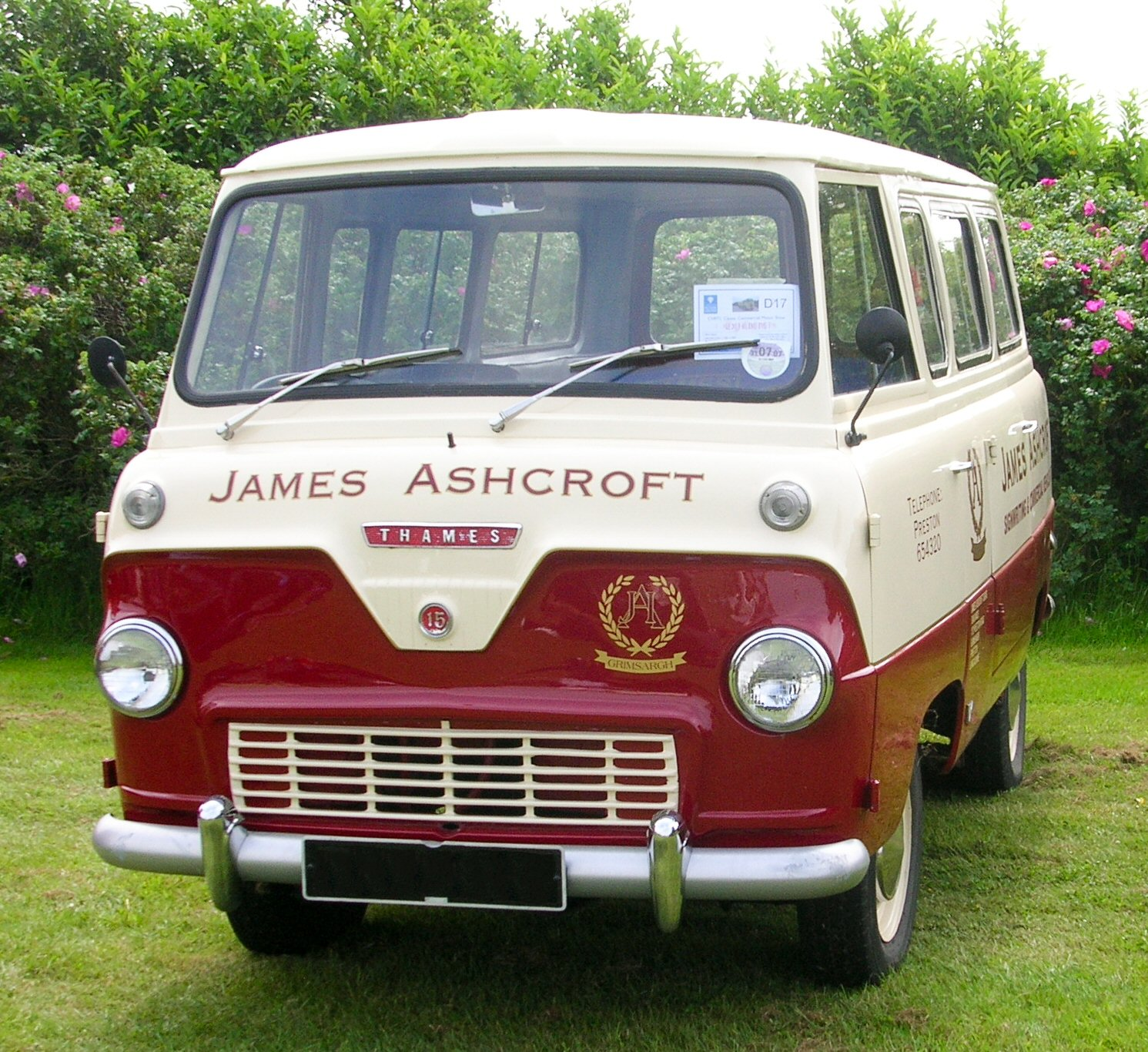
- Thames 15 cwt Minibus (400E)

Overview
- Manufacturer: Ford UK
- Also called: Thames 10/12 cwt Thames 15 cwt Thames 800; Thames Freighter
- Production: 1957–1965
- Assembly: Dagenham, United Kingdom; Australia; New Zealand

Body and chassis
- Class: Light commercial vehicle (M)
- Body style: van pickup minibus chassis cab

Powertrain
- Engine: 1.7 L I4 (petrol); 1.6 L I4 (diesel)

Chronology
- Predecessor: Ford E83W
- Successor: Ford Transit

The Ford Thames 400E is a commercial vehicle that was made by Ford UK and introduced in 1957. Production of the range continued until September 1965, by which time a total of 187,000 had been built. Publicity for the model included hiring the Cy Laurie band to make the promotional film short "Band Wagon", in 1958, preserved in the Ford Film and Video Collection at the National Motor Museum, Beaulieu

== History ==
By the mid 1950s, Ford lagged well behind the competition in the light commercial market. The model still on offer until 1957 was the trusty but antiquated Fordson E83W, released in 1938. Studies were therefore made of the competition in this sector, with the Morris Commercial 10 cwt and 15/20 cwt models, of prewar design; Austin 10 cwt, and later their 25 cwt; Trojan 15 cwt van; and the Bedford 10/12 cwt model all coming in for scrutiny.

Taking a design lead from the US parent, a well overdue new 10 / 12 / 15 cwt (1,100 / 1,300 / 1,700 lb; 510 / 610 / 760 kg) range was therefore decided upon, to be of the forward control type all based on the same 'outrigger' chassis. With regard to this 'outrigger chassis', Cab and chassis windscreen variants, (subsequently described as 'open' back) differed from the van, estate car, and express bus body models, (subsequently described as 'closed' back) models by the addition of an extra rear crossmember to support the spare wheel carrier and to close the rear ends of the chassis horns. On the 'closed' back models the nature of the rear bodywork meant the rear crossmember could be omitted for this purpose.

Another subtle difference between the 'open' back models Vs. 'closed' back models was the method of body attachment to the chassis.

On 'open' back models the rear chassis outriggers were designed to accept customers' own coachwork either attached via welded cleats or bolted directly. This bodywork be it a pickup buck or say an ambulance body typically added extra stability to the rear chassis however should not be considered essential because the chassis design is constructed so as to be sturdy enough without. To promote ease of conversion, 'open' back models had cab bodywork that bolted to the chassis and could therefore be removed easily during the conversion process giving better access to the chassis under.

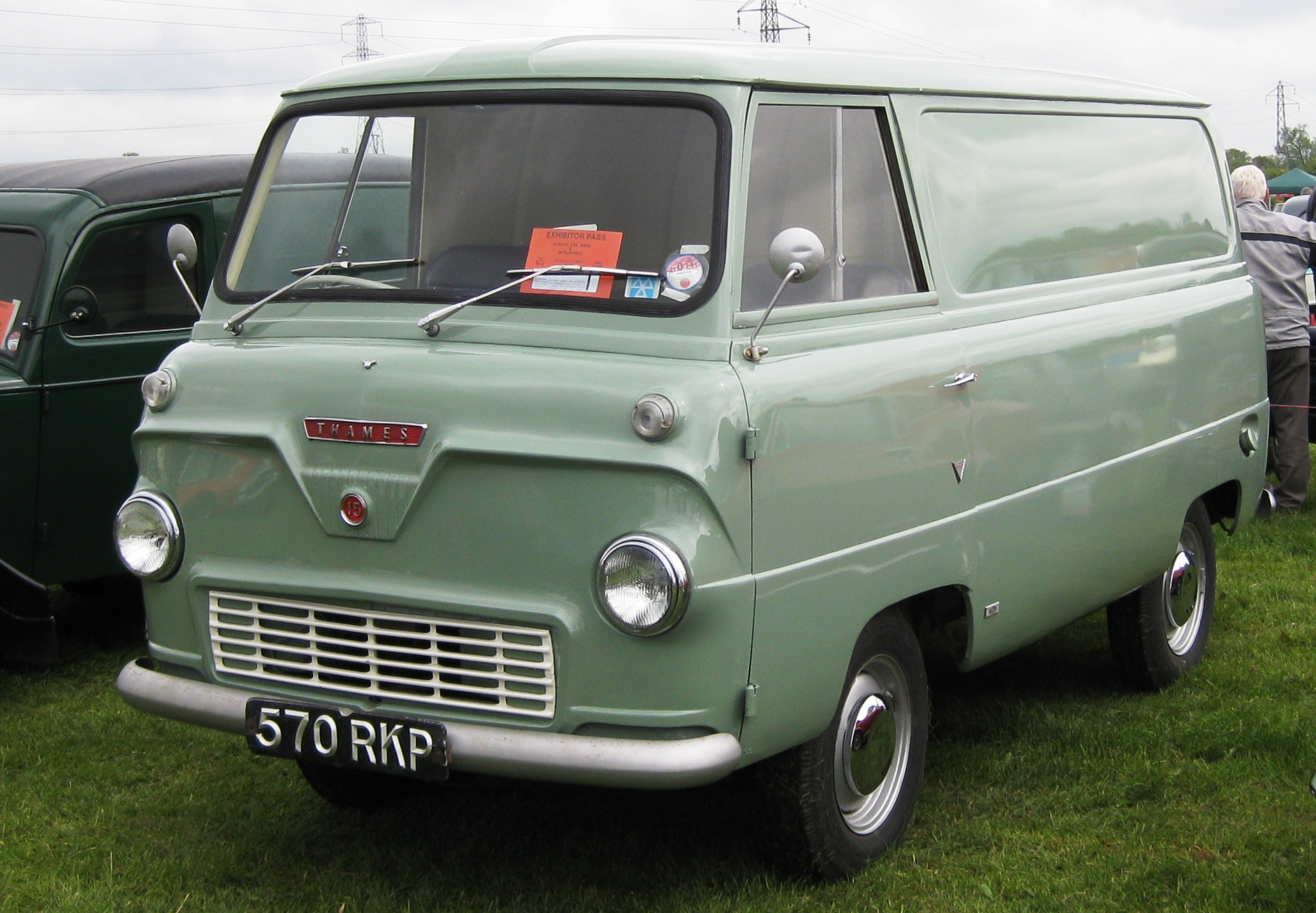
Thames 15 cwt Van (400E)

On 'closed' back models this flexibility for conversion was not considered necessary as customers buying an enclosed van type vehicle were unlikely to require access to the chassis in a similar fashion as 'open' back purchasers. More likely modification of the bodywork undertaken by 'closed' back purchasers would constitute removal of roof panels for elevating sections or the addition of windows as can be seen in many motor caravan conversions for example. As a result, it was decided that steel bodywork and cab sections could be welded directly to the chassis in places mainly for ease of construction and consequently adding additional stability to the chassis in a similar fashion to that of a coachbuilder converting an 'open' model. It should be stressed that this welded bodywork was not essential for maintaining acceptable levels of torsional chassis strength, the chassis design of the 'closed' back models should not be considered as 'unitary' for this reason. The correct definition in this case is a 'body reinforced separate chassis'.

A wheelbase of 84 inches (2,100 mm) was chosen, upon which was accommodated a van body of 180 cubic feet (5.1 m^{3}) capacity, After some discussion, independent front suspension was sanctioned, but not of the MacPherson strut type which Dagenham had pioneered in the monocoque passenger car applications for which it had been specifically designed in the first place. This system was considered, but its inclusion in the forward control, forward entrance van would, primarily because of the strut height, have placed serious restrictions on cab design particularly in respect of entry. Instead, a system of coil springs and transverse wishbones was agreed upon.

An ideal engine and transmission existed amongst Dagenham's passenger car range, this being the Consul's 1703 cc ohv engine, with its associated three speed gearbox with synchromesh between the upper two ratios and a column gearchange mechanism, and the two pinion differential three quarter floating final drive. The low compression (6.9: 1) version of this engine, developing 53 bhp (40 kW) at 4400 rpm was chosen, with the Consul's regular high compression cylinder head (7.8:1) being optional on the new van, A further option was to be the Perkins 4/99 diesel, this being a 1.6 litre four cylinder unit producing only 42 bhp (31 kW), therefore somewhat marginal from a performance viewpoint but offering useful long term economies over the petrol engine.

From January 1963 an improved version of the 1703 cc engine was introduced for the range being uprated to 55 bhp (41 kW) in low compression form, while for premium petrol users a high compression head was offered which gave this Zephyr 4-derived unit an output of 58 bhp (43 kW). A four-speed all synchromesh gearbox was also available from this time, and if fitted a heavy duty back axle with a four-pinion differential was specified.

Production commenced in September 1957, with the model being announced as the Thames 400E series. A bold Thames nameplate appeared on the front beneath which was a circular emblem containing the appropriate figure identifying the vehicle's capacity class. The new model quickly met with widespread approval, and passenger transport use was soon being catered for with the availability of an 8/10 seater estate car derivative, and a 12-seat minibus based on the 15 cwt model. The success of the estate car variant was such that it later became available in a De Luxe configuration, complete with chrome plated overriders for its front bumper, chrome side mouldings and window trims, and dual exterior mirrors.

In March 1965, when the D series trucks were introduced, all commercial vehicle models took the Ford name so the 400E then appeared with a Ford nameplate on the front panel. The range did not continue in this guise for very long, the last models being built in August 1965 pending the introduction of a new range of vans which had been tested and developed since about 1963 under the codename of Redcap.

== Special bodies ==
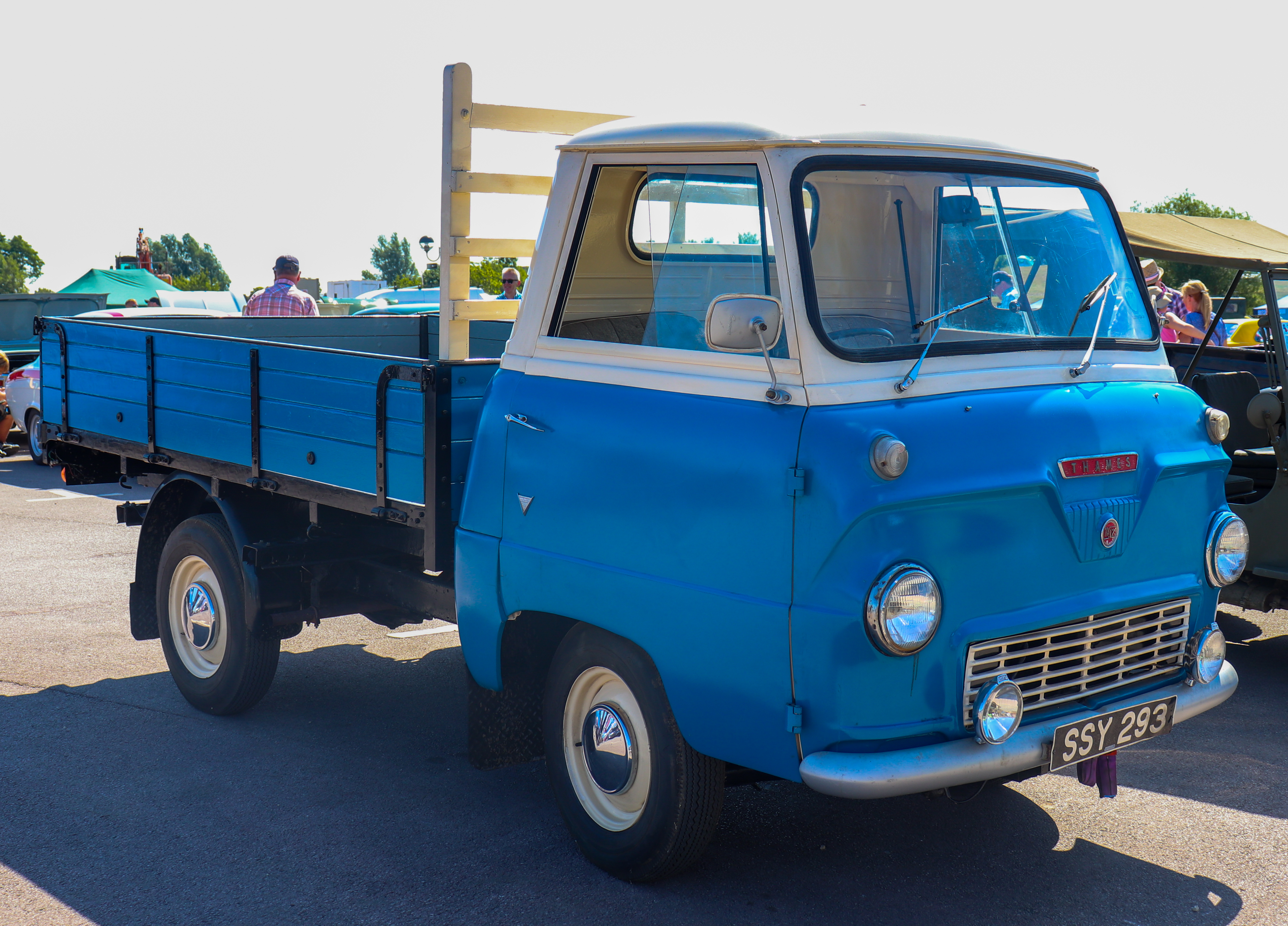
Thames 15 cwt Chassis Cab (400E)

Within only a short period of time a wide variety of special bodies was available from outside suppliers, with Ford approval for these being confirmed in many cases by their inclusion in the Ford Motor Company's official glossy brochures. Mobile shops, milk floats, ambulances, flat platform trucks with generators or compressors and box vans, and the popular pick up trucks all appeared.

Other special bodies appeared in the 400E range catalogue, including tower wagons, luton vans, and an unusual flat truck with an air compressor. Called the Powertruc this was no ordinary air compressor truck, for it featured a design whereby the engine of the compressor also propelled the Vehicle from its position at the rear of the cab. The Powertruc name appeared at the front in place of the usual Thames nameplate.

By 1961 the pickup had become so popular that it was available as a standard model, being catalogued along with the chassis/cab, van and 12 seater, but Walkers of Watford produced their own particular style of pickup, which could be recognised by its substantial box section down the sides compared with the flush sides of the standard Ford pickup. A small tipper body with screw type gear was also listed, as was a standard dropside truck. Several styles of van body were offered, such as a box body of 300 cu ft (8.5 m^{3}), a van body of 315 cu ft (8.9 m^{3}), a pantechnicon with integral cab offering 415 cu ft (11.8 m^{3}) capacity or with a factory cab 400 cu ft (11 m^{3}). A milk float was also listed, as was a body style called a canopy pickup. This was a conversion of the standard panel van, but with the roof and sides down to the waist rail removed from a point about halfway along to the rear. The rear doors were also removed and a drop tailboard substituted, while a partition was put at the back of the cab area and a tip up seat built on to this bulkhead. The Eagle Engineering Company of Warwick produced small tower wagon equipment for the 400E, while Tuke & Bell Ltd supplied a special little slide cover refuse truck, suitable for narrow alleys or pedestrian precincts.

== Left hand drive versions ==
Left hand drive 400E models were available from the start, thus ensuring healthy overseas sales, with one of the many European countries taking the 400E van being Denmark where the Ford Motor Company had an assembly plant. Ford of Denmark sales staff requested authority from Britain to market an increased wheelbase chassis cab version of the 400E and with a six cylinder (Zephyr) engine as an option, to meet specific local demands, and a senior truck engineer from Rainham travelled to Ford's Copenhagen plant to investigate the possibility. Danish Ministry of Transport approval was also necessary and all testing on its behalf was carried out at the University of Denmark's laboratories. Appropriate care had been taken in lengthening the chassis frame, and after the lengthened propeller shaft had successfully undergone testing which would have revealed any shortcomings such as vibration due to run-out, or critical whirling (resonant) speeds the conversion received the approval of the Danish ministry and Ford of Britain's senior truck engineer.

== 400E 10/12 and 15 cwt models ==
Ever since the days of the first Model T trucks the Ford Motor Company always had a vehicle in the popular 10/15/20 cwt category, although with the speedy 15 cwt normal control model of 1939 being discontinued a year or so later only the E83W 10 cwt van was available immediately after the war, whereas Morris had their 10 cwt model Y and the PV 15/20 cwt, both of them prewar designs. Commer retained their 8 cwt van, which was updated in 1947, plus the larger 25 cwt van, while Austin produced a 10 cwt van, and then narrowed the gap between their larger trucks by introducing the 25 cwt '3 way' in 1947. Trojan were also there with their 15 cwt van, while Bedford had the PCV 10/12 cwt and the K 30 cwt, so there was plenty of variety in that particularly lucrative area of the market.

In some ways the 15/20/25 cwt payload area was a bit of a no man's land. The smaller 5 cwt, 8 cwt and 10 cwt vans were usually car based, while the larger payload vehicles of 30 cwt, 2 ton and upwards were designed as trucks with little or no relationship to their passenger car cousins. In between is the 'grey' area, where the vehicles require a larger frame, springs, etc., to carry more weight than the larger saloons of the period, yet can suffer from a high unladen weight (and tax) if the beefier frames and axles of the real trucks are used.

In the past there had been several contenders in this field, Ford, for instance, offering a choice of no less than three different engines for their 1939 15 cwt van, 22 hp (16 kW), 24 hp (18 kW) and 30 hp (22 kW). These were some of the vehicles chosen to tow trailer fire pumps at the start of the war, no doubt because of their performance potential in an emergency situation.

Another rather special type of van had come into use by some of the newspaper distributors, who required a vehicle of about 200 cubic feet (5.7 m^{3}), but with the performance of a sports car. The 15 cwt Ford was used for this type of operation in prewar days, as was the Chrysler Dodge of similar capacity. Large car chassis were also taken into use, the Humber Hawk and Snipe being in this category, while when they disappeared the Austin FX3 taxi chassis was used as a basis for these vans. Ford's entry into this field was the Pilot, a postwar design derivative of one of their popular prewar V 8 saloons. The chassis of this model was available for specialist bodywork, and a number of them appeared as high powered vans and pickups, many going for export. However, because of its minimal load space as a bonnetted vehicle the Pilot was not very saleable to run of the mill van users, a drawback also shared by the Standard Vanguard van and pickup of similar layout and the Austin A70 Hampshire.

What the market required was a van of 10/15/20 cwt capacity, but built within a confined space, with the larger 'portion of the bodywork given over to the carrying area. This precluded the bonnetted layout unless it was of minimal protrusion. Ford's answer to the problem came in 1957, when the 400E 10/12 and 15 cwt models were announced. In one stroke Ford had produced a van which was good looking, capacious, convenient and particularly nippy. By utilizing the engine of the best selling Consul the van was assured of a lively performance, and by mounting the unit low down in the frame between the front wheels, it was possible for the driver to slide over the engine cover if nearside exit was demanded.

Some users criticised the use of hinged doors, feeling that sliding doors would be of more use for quick exits or in confined places, but others were quick to point out the drawbacks of this type of door. With a plain panel sided van sliding doors are OK, but the 400E was designed to have access to the body via a side door in addition to the double rear doors. It was also produced as a chassis/cab for pickup or other style of special bodywork, so precluding the use of sliding doors, and anyone who has had experience of them knows they are a mixed blessing when one comes to repair them.

Whereas the E83W was a regular little van. By 1957, it was ready for replacement. The new model achieved higher sales than its precursor. It was received well by van owners.

The model was available as in integral all steel panel van with hinged doors to the cab and a pair of hinged doors at the rear; an additional hinged door on the nearside was an optional extra. It was available in two payload ratings 10/12 cwt and 15 cwt. The second standard body was the 8/10seat estate car, which had three windows to each side to the rear of the cab section, one of these being in the standard nearside door with automatic folding step for easy entry. For the mounting of special bodies the 400E was available in chassis only, chassis/scuttle, and chassis/cab form.

Within a short while a 12-seater variation of the estate car appeared, this time with longitudinal seats and a fixed step to the rear. In contemporary literature this model was called a '12 seater bus', and the previous transverse seat model was not shown, although it was still listed in the price schedule.

In early catalogues of the range a de luxe version of the 15 cwt estate car was shown complete with chrome overriders to the front bumpers, chrome exterior mouldings, chrome window trims and a two tone colour scheme. Two exterior mirrors were fitted as well as more luxurious interior trim and fittings. Whether because of the higher rate of purchase tax which was current at the time, or for some other reason, very few of the de luxe estate cars appear to have been sold in Britain. In fact it was not long before the estate car was dropped in favour of the larger capacity 12 seat bus, this being listed as from September 1958. This 12 seater did not attract purchase tax, the Government thinking behind this probably assuming that no one would buy a 12¬seater in place of a private car.

As with the older type of 10 cwt van, the new 400E range found plenty of scope for special bodywork. Although the 'official' pickup was not catalogued until February 1961, others had been built by individual bodybuilders to order, as well as tippers, high top vans, etc. One conversion was carried out by Normand on some special insulated vans for delivering ice cream. From the offside the van could be taken for a standard production 15 cwt at first sight, although at close range the shape was not exactly the same as the Ford body. Closer inspection revealed that the body was in fact thickly insulated and that the nearside door of the cab was louvred to provide ventilation for the refrigeration equipment carried in the nearside of the cab compartment. Also available from February 1961 was the Perkins 4/99 diesel engine for those who chose economy before performance. Recently a 1960s photograph appeared in a major UK vintage vehicles magazine that shows a Fordson tractor fitted with a 400e cab. It is not known if this was an amateur one-off tractor safety cab or a professional bodywork conversion offered to the agricultural sector at the time.

== Bus versions ==
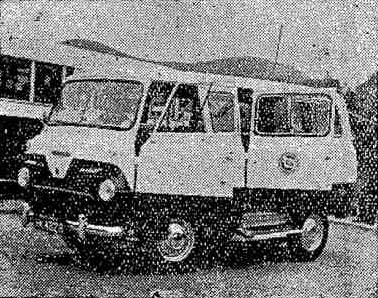

As well as making the 12-seater bus, Martin Walter produced another version called the Farmer's Model Utilabrake, which had two front upholstered seats, but plainwood slatted seats arranged along the sides of the rear part of the body. For a little comfort, pvc backrests were supplied for the longitudinal seats, unlike in the 12-seater Work Bus which was designed for rough usage and did not have this comfort for its occupants.

Other interesting conversions of the 15 cwt were special PSV (Public Service Vehicle) models which were produced by Martin Walter and Kenex. The Martin Walter model was the Utilabus PSV, which could be obtained with both side and rear doors or merely a rear only. To comply with the then-current PSV regulations it had a raised reinforced plastics roof panel in order to achieve the required headroom. Vertical grab rails were provided at the rear, the seats had the necessary spacing, and a bar type lifeguard was fitted below the side of the body between the wheelarches.

The Kenex company offered two models which complied with the PSV regulations: the Kenebus 12-seater and the Kenecoach for 11 passengers. The Kenebus had longitudinal seats and a bar type separator for the driver's compartment, while the Kenecoach used transverse seating and had a panelled divider to keep the passengers from bothering the driver. Kenex also offered their own version of the ordinary 12-seater light bus without PSV certificate of fitness, this being the Kenebrake if supplied with upholstered seats, or the Yeoman if fitted with wood slat type seating. From a distance, the Kenex PSV types are distinguishable by their lifeguards, which are made up of solid panels as opposed to the slat type of Martin Walter models.

A Ford Thames 400E Express Bus, cream-coloured and sporting license plate number 6834 KD, had been the Beatles' workhorse since the summer of 1962, when manager Brian Epstein purchased it via Liverpool car salesman Terry Doran.

== Motor caravan conversions ==
The Thames van was also instrumental in helping the motorised caravan or campervan to establish itself in a period when people were extending their horizons with regard to holidays and camping. The Ford Thames 15 cwt van formed an ideal base for a motor caravan because it could double as an ordinary vehicle during the week and be used for picnics or breaks away from home at weekends. Its roughly square shape lent itself well to conversion to a caravan, as many people had noticed when they saw the estate car and 12 seater bus versions.

Another virtue of the vehicle was its engine size. for at 1,703 cc (103.9 cu in) it was considerably larger than its contemporaries and was well suited to the considerable weight of some of the caravan conversions. For convenience a higher roof line was needed, although some conversions used the elevating or folding extensions to minimise travelling height and cost.

The Martin Walters conversions, known as the Dormobile were once synonymous with the word campervan. In fact before the modern popularity of the VW campervan most people used the brand name Dormobile to describe a campervan. Nowadays, it has become popular to hire a classic campervan but out of the numerous campervan hire companies out there, only one is offering the British made Ford Thames 400e Dormobile.

M. Calthorpe (Coachbuilders) Ltd.; Airborne Service Equipment Ltd.; Kenex Coachworks Ltd.; Moortown Motors Ltd.; M.T.S. & Co. Ltd.; Peter Pitt; and Martin Walter Ltd., all appeared in Ford's "Holiday Adventurers" brochure dealing exclusively with motor caravans.

== See also ==
- Ford Thames 300E - small car based light van
- Thames Trader - heavier trucks
- Commer FC - built similar vans
- Morris Commercial J4 – similarly-sized vans from the same period
- Ford E83W
