= Fordson E83W =

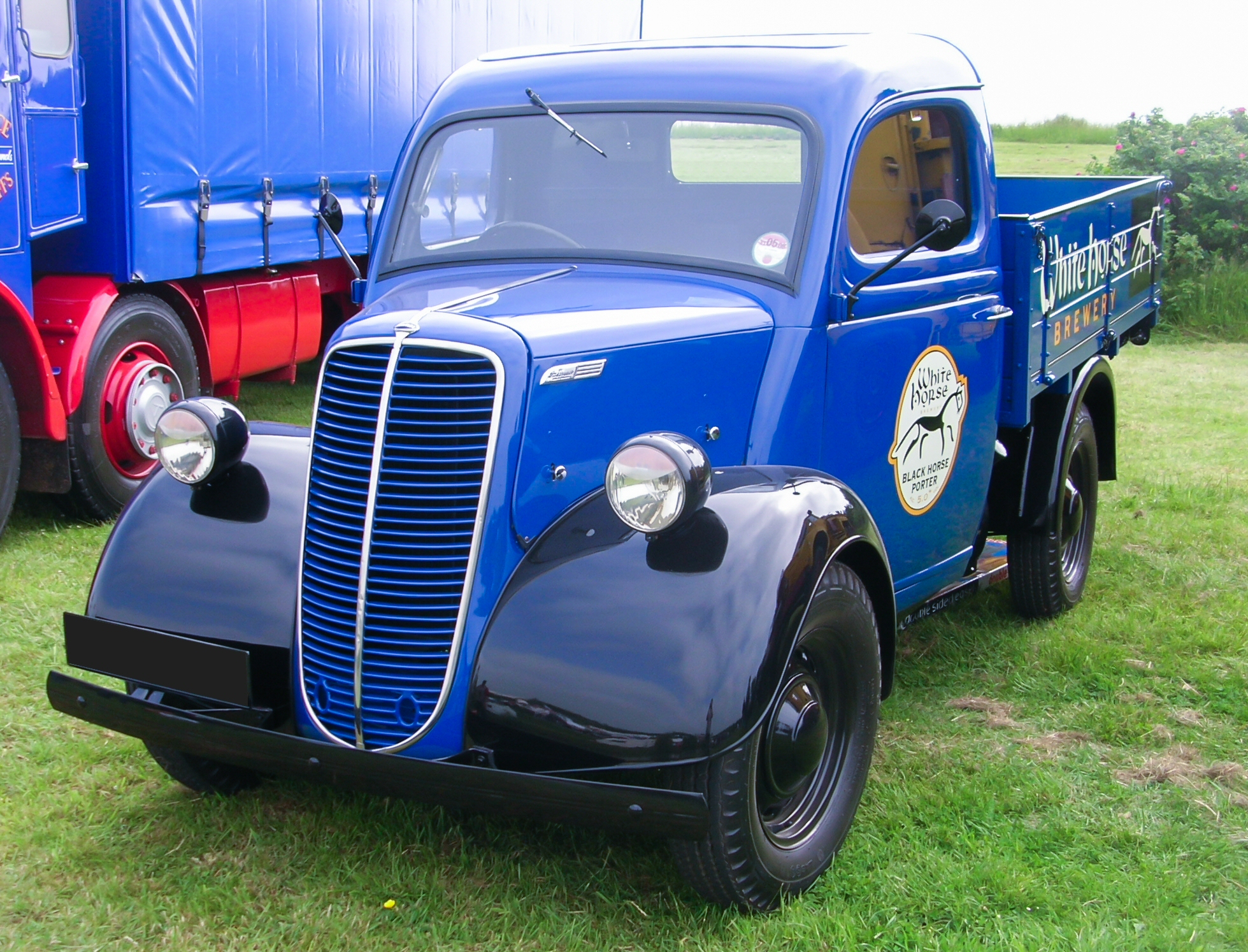

Overview
- Manufacturer: Ford
- Also called: Ford Ten-Ten (Australia); Fordson 10 cwt; Thames 10 cwt; Thames ½-Ton
- Production: 1938–1957
- Assembly: England: Dagenham, East London

Body and chassis
- Body style: Panel van; Pick-up; Estate car

Powertrain
- Engine: 1.2 L sv I4
- Transmission: 3-speed manual

Dimensions
- Wheelbase: 78 in (1,981 mm)
- Length: 157.5 in (4,000 mm)
- Width: 64 in (1,626 mm)
- Curb weight: 890–1,100 kg (1,962–2,425 lb)

Chronology
- Predecessor: Ford Pilot V8 pickup & van
- Successor: Ford Thames 400E

The Fordson E83W (also sold from 1952 under the Thames brand as Thames E83W) is a 10 cwt (half ton) light commercial vehicle that was built by Ford of Britain at the Ford Dagenham assembly plant (home of Fordson tractors) between 1938 and 1957. The van was sold in Australia as the Ford Ten-Ten, and the E83W was available in various forms around much of the world as Britain strove to export after World War II. In some countries, the 'cowl and chassis' only was imported and local bodies built.

The E83W was aimed at the small haulage, trade and merchant market, sectors in which it sold well. An estate car variant was also available. During and after World War II, many specialist variations such as mobile canteens, ice cream vans and even fire pumps were built on the E83W chassis. An estate variant was also marketed but did not find much success. Its main competitor was the Bedford HC and JC models produced by General Motors' UK commercial subsidiary.

The E83W was powered by the 1,172 cc (71.5 cu in) Ford 10 hp side-valve engine, producing 30 bhp (22 kW), with a 3-speed gearbox, and was heavily geared down in the rear axle. This made the Fordson much slower than the saloons, with an effective top speed of not much over 40 mph (64 km/h). Apart from the "ten" hp engine, the E83W shares few parts with the other small Fords, which does make spares a little harder to get hold of. The front and rear axles are much heavier than the saloon and 5cwt van components, and share some parts such as bearings and other internals with the contemporary Ford V8 models (Models 62 and E71A Pilot). The headlamps were shared with the E27N tractor, for which they were an optional extra only.

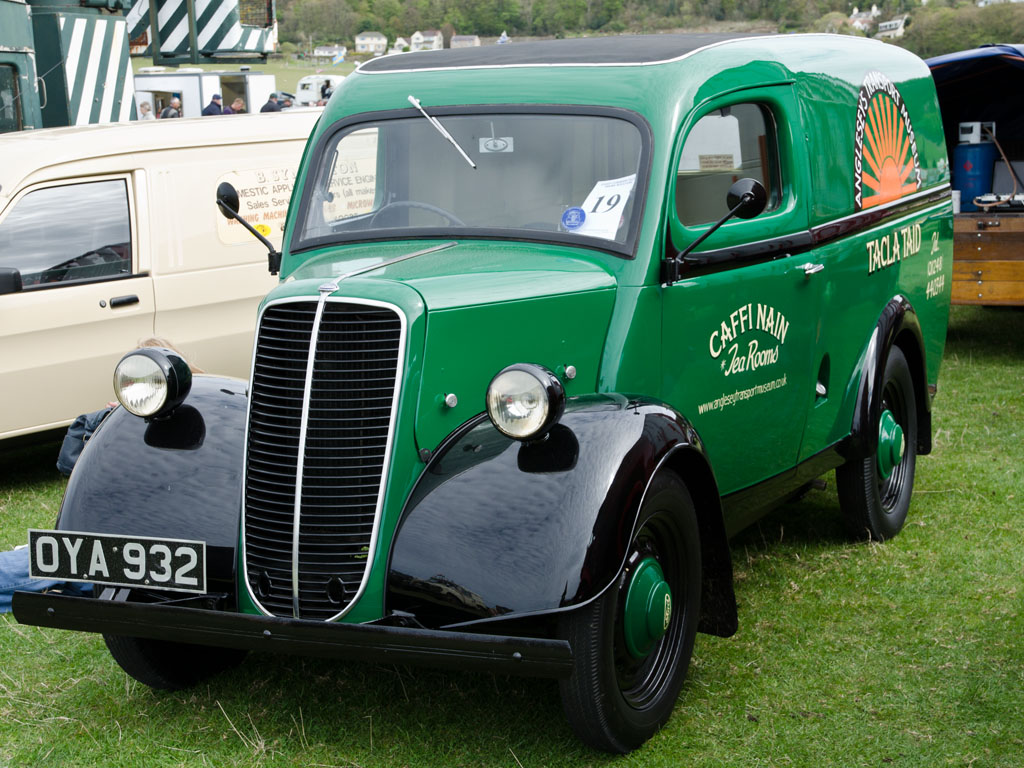
Fordson E83W Van (1952)

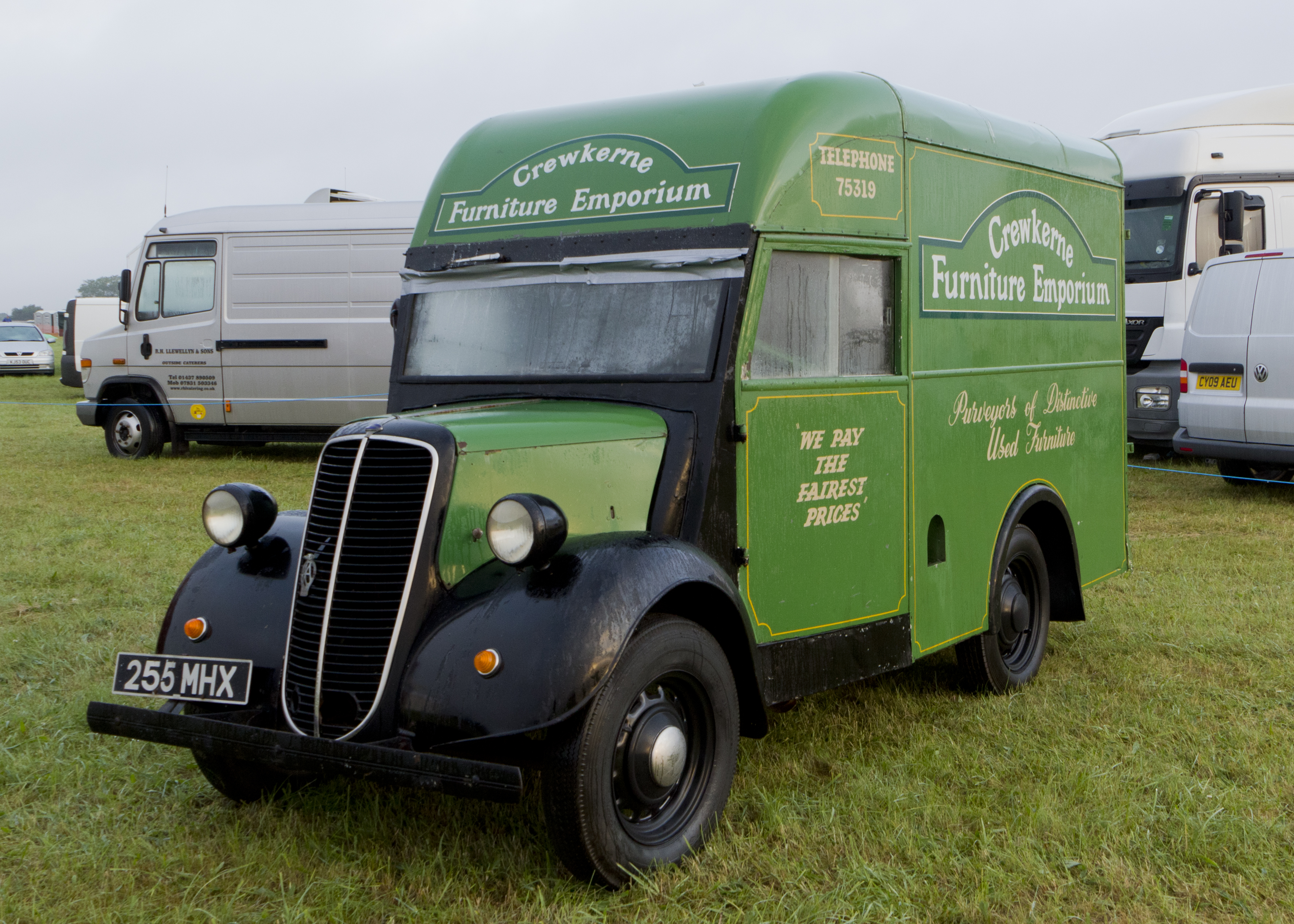
Fordson E83W moving/luton van
