= Simca 5 =

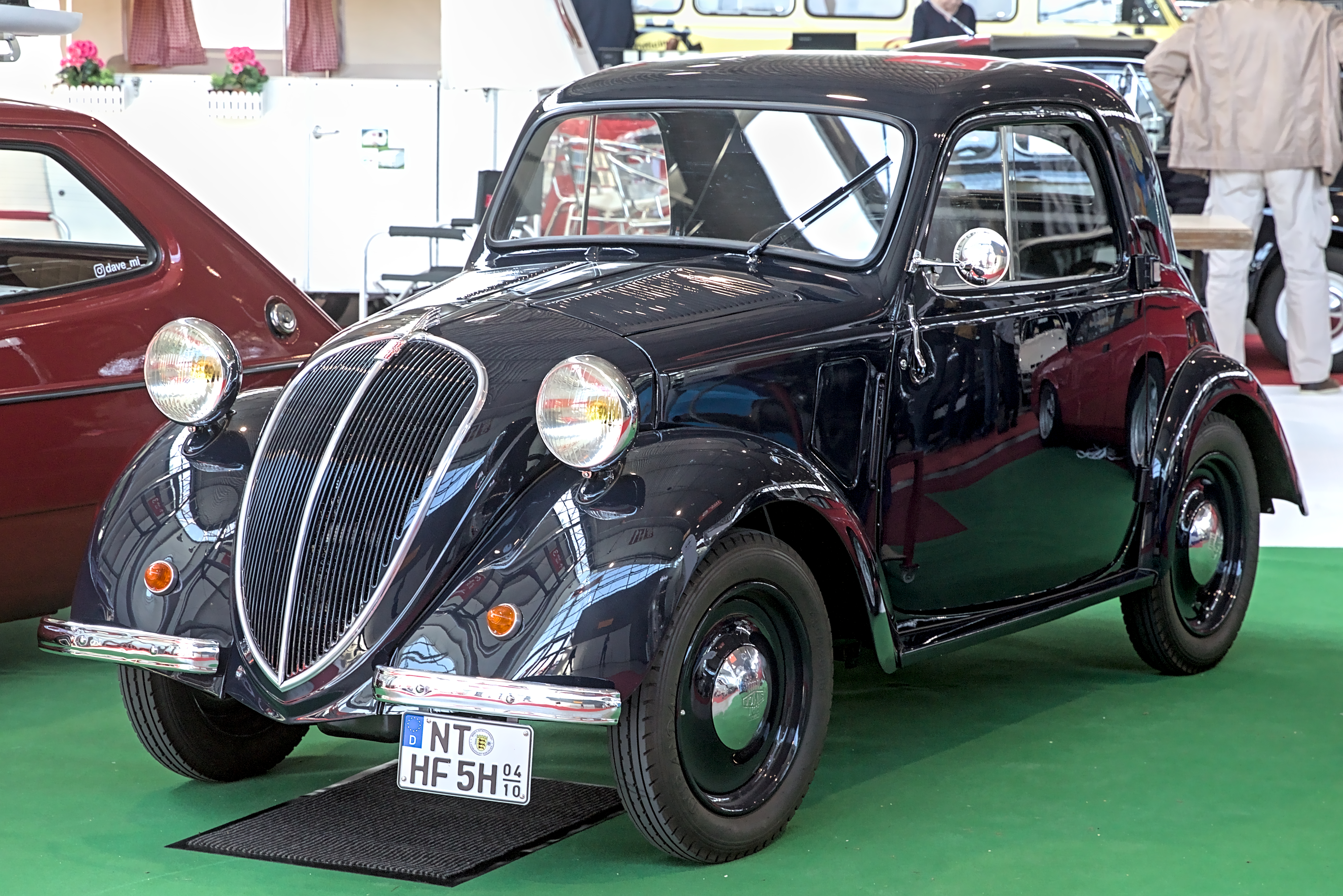

Overview
- Manufacturer: Simca
- Production: 1936–1948
- Assembly: France: Nanterre

Body and chassis
- Class: City car
- Body style: 2-door saloon
- Layout: FR layout
- Related: Fiat Topolino

Powertrain
- Engine: I4 570 cc
- Transmission: 4-speed manual

Dimensions
- Wheelbase: 2,000 mm (78.7 in)
- Length: 3,220 mm (126.8 in)
- Width: 1,350 mm (53.1 in)
- Height: 1,400 mm (55.1 in)

Chronology
- Successor: Simca 6

The Simca 5 is a small Franco-Italian passenger car designed by Fiat engineers at Turin and produced in France by Simca from 1936 to 1948. It was virtually identical to the Fiat 500 Topolino on which it was based, but was first presented, at the company's new Nanterre plant, three months ahead of the Fiat equivalent on 10 March 1936. Production was delayed, however, by a wave of strikes, that accompanied the June 1936 electoral victory of Léon Blum's Popular Front government. The manufacturer boasted at the time of its launch of being ahead of the "plans across the Rhine": this was a reference to the already rumoured launch of the Volkswagen Beetle which would appear only in 1938.

Advanced features included independent front suspension, a 4-speed gear box, hydraulically controlled drum brakes on all four wheels and a 12-volt electrical system. The Simca 5 also offered exceptional fuel economy. In a test it managed to travel 110 kilometers on just 5 litres of fuel, which equates to 4.545 L/100 km or 51.75 mpg

The car was originally intended for sale on the domestic market for less than 10,000 French Francs, an aspiration soon overtaken by a decline in the currency's value that gathered pace in the second half of the 1930s. By the time of the 32nd Paris Motor Show in October 1938, the manufacturer's listed price even for the base "standard" bodied car, was 13,980 francs. With an engine size that corresponded with the 3CV car tax band the Simca 5, along with its Fiat sibling, could be presented as the "smallest volume production car in the world".

Production of the Simca 5 was slowed (but did not ever cease entirely) by the war and the period of German occupation in the early 1940s, but resumed in 1946. A number were commandeered by the German Army for use as staff cars. 46,472 of the cars had been produced by the time the car was delisted by Simca in 1949. By now it had been replaced on the company's production lines by the similar but partially reskinned and slightly more powerful Simca 6.

- This entry is based on a translation of the French Wikipedia corresponding entry
