= Fiat 500 "Topolino" =

Italian city car (1936–1955)

Fiat 500
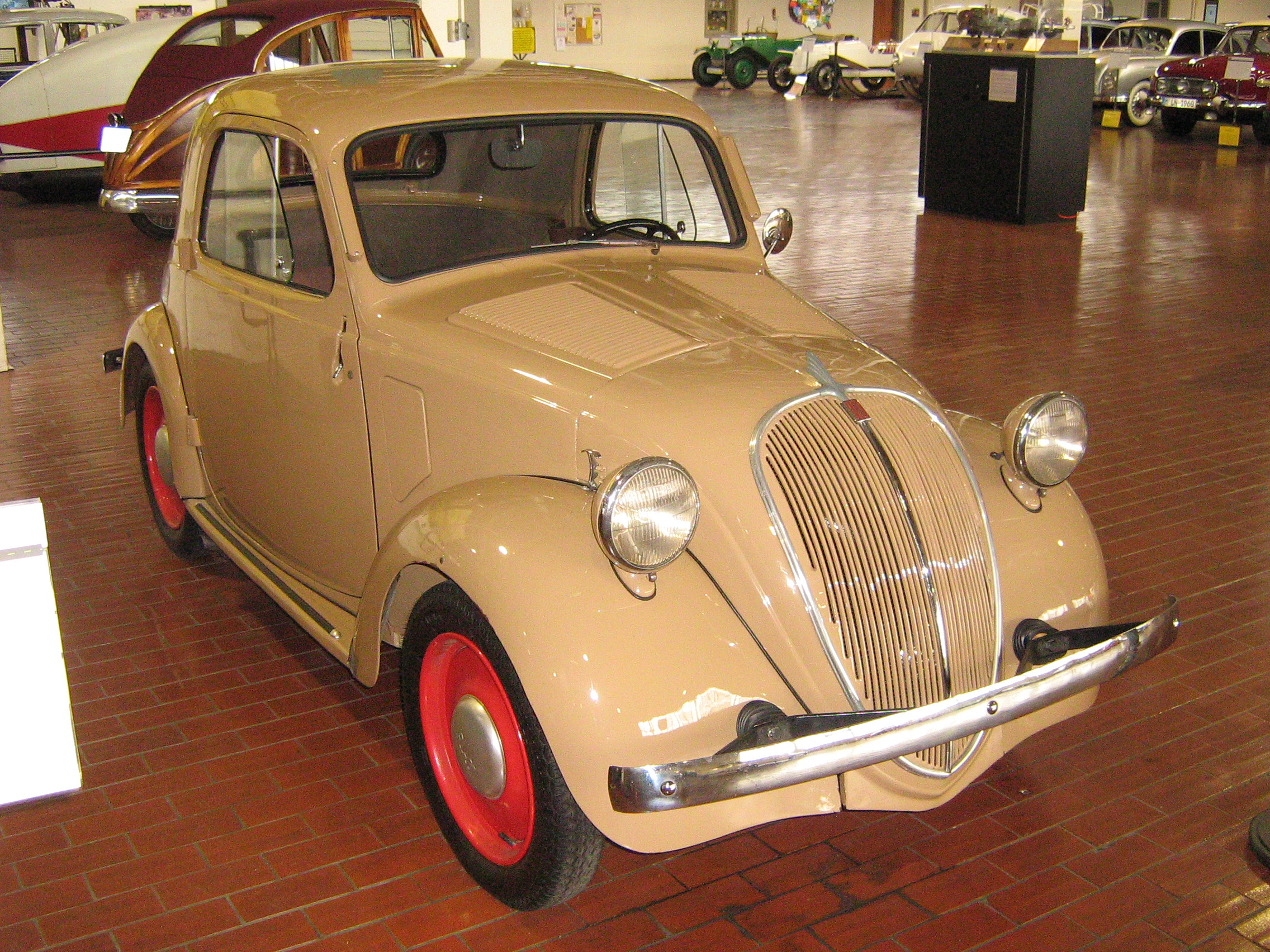

Overview
- Manufacturer: Fiat
- Also called: Topolino
- Production: 1936–1955; 520,000 made
- Assembly: Italy: Lingotto, Turin; Italy: Mirafiori, Turin (1947–1955)
- Designer: Oreste Lardone, Dante Giacosa

Body and chassis
- Class: City car (A)
- Body style: 2-door saloon; 2-door convertible saloon; 2-door van; 3-door estate
- Layout: Front-engine, rear-wheel-drive
- Related: Simca 5; Simca 6

Powertrain
- Engine: 569 cc I4
- Transmission: 4-speed synchromesh manual

Dimensions
- Wheelbase: 2,000 mm (78.7 in)
- Length: 3,215–3,245 mm (126.6–127.8 in) (saloon)
- Width: 1,275–1,288 mm (50.2–50.7 in)
- Height: 1,377 mm (54.2 in)
- Kerb weight: 550–750 kg (1,213–1,653 lb)

Chronology
- Successor: Fiat 500; Fiat 600

The Fiat 500, commonly known as "Topolino" (pronounced [topoˈliːno]), is an Italian city car produced and manufactured by Fiat from 1936 to 1955.

The name Topolino is Italian for 'little mouse', and is also the Italian name for Mickey Mouse.

== History ==
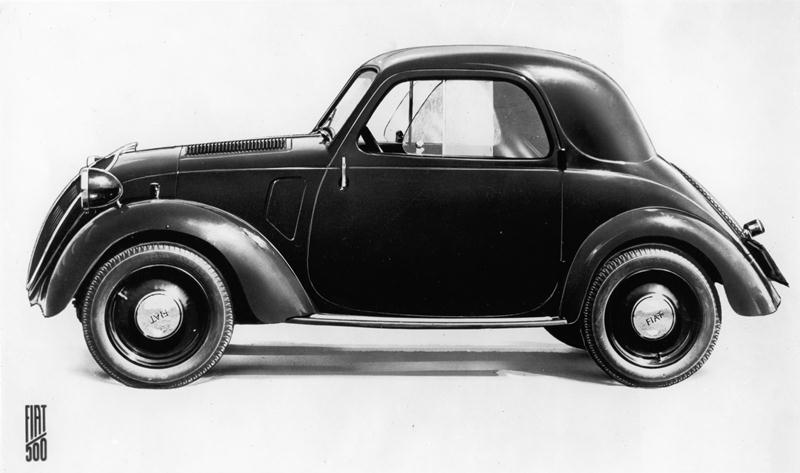
500 Topolino (1936), Centro Storico Fiat

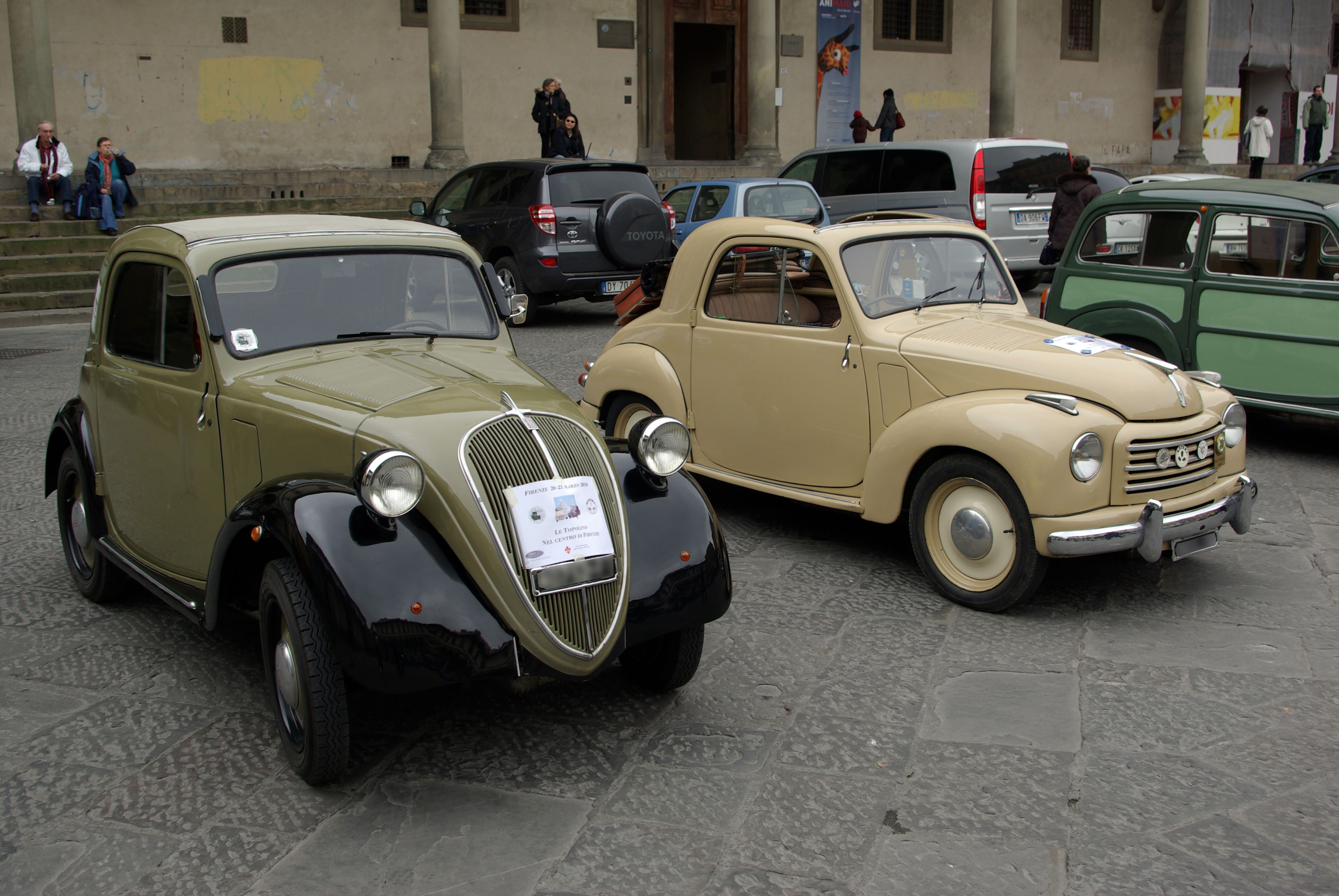
Left to right: a 1936–1949 500(A)/ B, a 1950–55 500C sedan, and the back of a post-war 500 wagon

The Topolino was one of the smallest cars in the world at the time of its production. Launched in June 1936, three models were produced until 1955, all with only minor mechanical and cosmetic changes. It was equipped with a 569 cc four-cylinder, side-valve, water-cooled engine mounted in front of the front axle (later an overhead valve motor), and so was a full-scale car rather than a cyclecar. The radiator was located behind the engine which made possible a lowered aerodynamic nose profile at a time when competitors had a flat, nearly vertical grille. The shape of the car's front allowed exceptional forward visibility.

Rear suspension initially used quarter-elliptic rear springs, but buyers frequently squeezed four or five people into the nominally two-seater car, and in later models the chassis was extended at the rear to allow for more robust semi-elliptic springs.

With a power output of around 10 kW (13 bhp), its top speed was around 85 km/h (53 mph), and could achieve fuel consumption levels up to an estimated 6 l/100 km (39 mpg_{‑US}). The target price given when the car was planned was 5,000 lire. The price at launch was 9,750 lire, though the decade was one of falling prices in several parts of Europe, and later in the 1930's, the Topolino was sold for about 8,900 lire. Despite being more expensive than first envisioned, the car was competitively priced. Nearly 520,000 were sold.

Three models were produced. The Model A and B shared the same body, but the engine of the model B had a 12 kW (16 hp) power output compared to the 9.7 kW (13 hp) power output of the Model A, produced from 1937 to 1948, while the model B was produced in 1948 and 1949. The Model A was offered as a 2-door saloon, 2-door convertible saloon with a folding roof and a 2-door van, while the Model B also introduced a 3-door estate under the name 500 B Giardiniera ("Gardener").

The Giardiniera was initially only available as a so-called woodie, with an outside ash frame being used instead of steel, and was available in seven metallic colors. When it was later renamed as the Belvedere, the wood was replaced with metal. This model and the regular two-seater Convertible-Limousine were also produced in France by Simca as the Simca 5, and in Germany by the German Fiat subsidiary NSU-Fiat.

The Model C was introduced in 1949 with a restyled body and the same engine as the Model B, and was offered in 2-door saloon, 2-door convertible saloon, 3-door estate and 2-door van body styles. In 1952, the Giardiniera was renamed the Belvedere ("A turret or other raised structure offering a pleasant view of the surrounding area", referring to its sunroof). The Model C was produced until 1955.

In 1955 the larger rear-wheel-drive Fiat 600 was launched by Fiat and that would become the design basis for the new Fiat 500, the Nuova 500. These two models ended up replacing the original 500.

== In popular culture ==
- La Topolino Amaranto is a 1975 song by the Italian artist Paolo Conte. The song's lyrics are about the summer of 1946 (″È l'estate del '46″) so probably the mentioned car is the first model Fiat 500 A in amaranth color.
- After its initial run, the Topolino became a popular choice for hot rodders in North America beginning in the 1950s, due to their lightweight size, rear-wheel drive, and ability to fit a V8 engine underneath the hood.
- In the 2011 animated film "Cars 2", the character Uncle Topolino is based on a first generation Topolino.

== Gallery ==
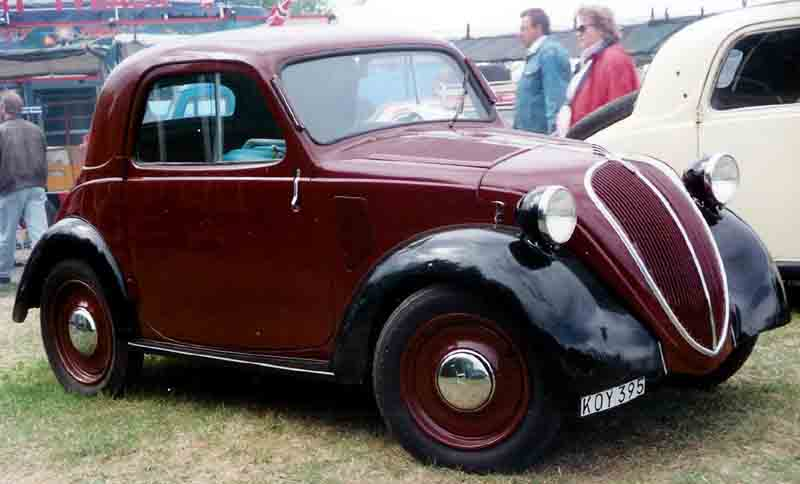
Fiat 500 A saloon 1939

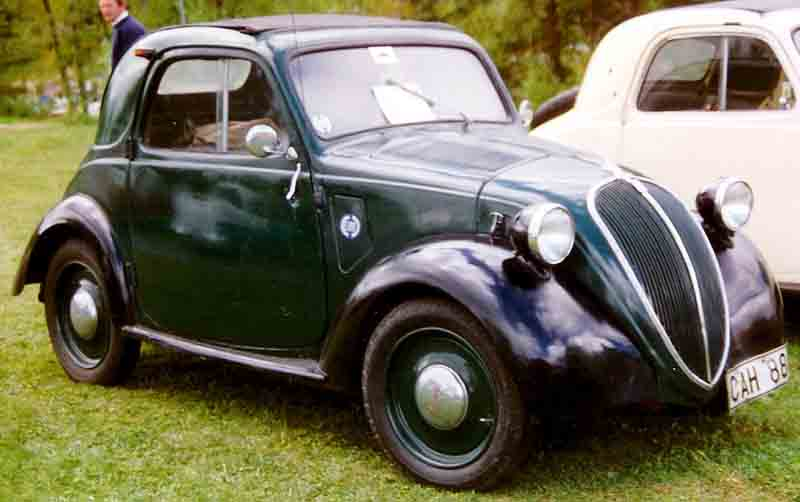
Fiat 500 A convertible saloon 1939

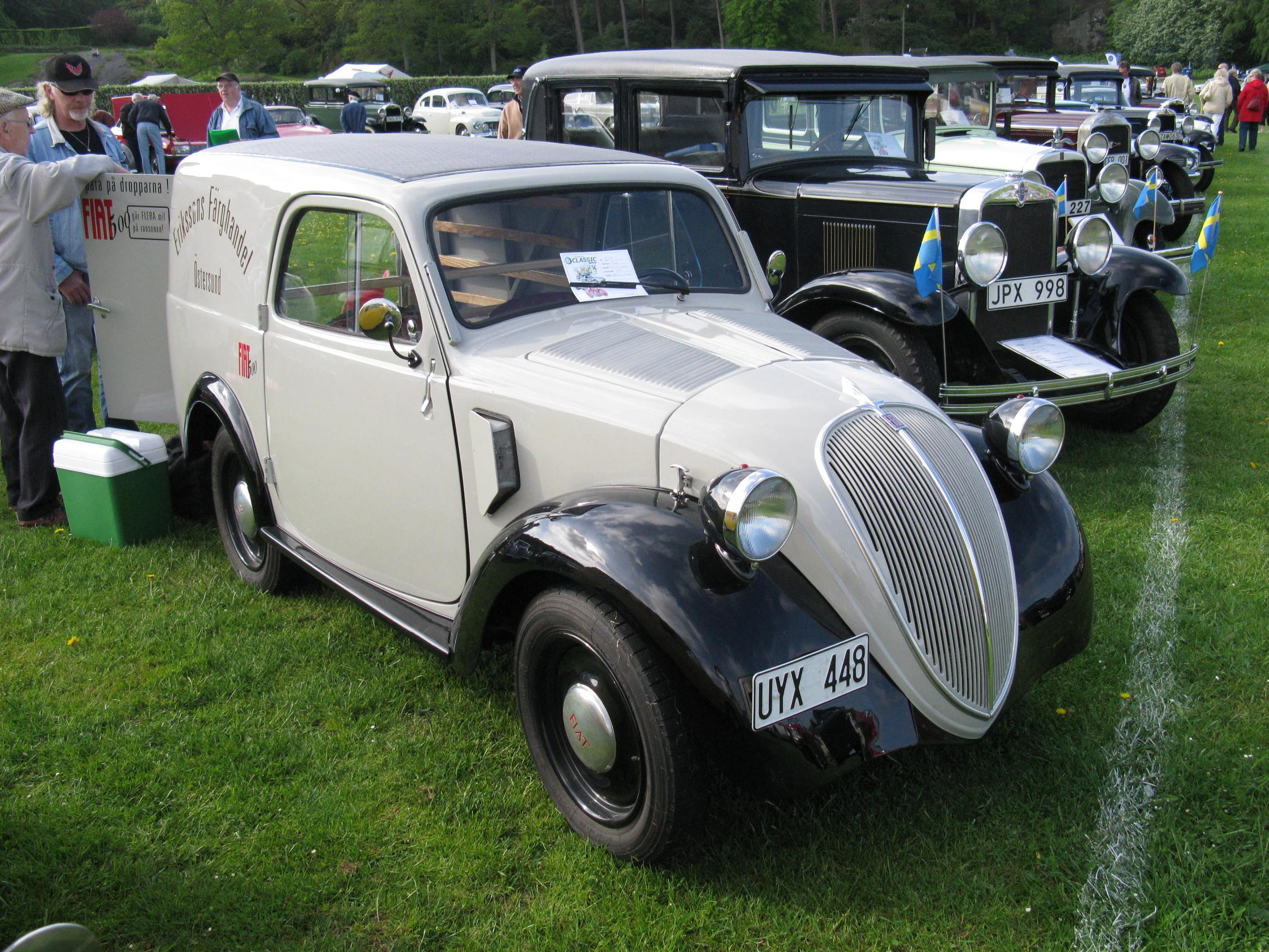
Fiat 500 B van

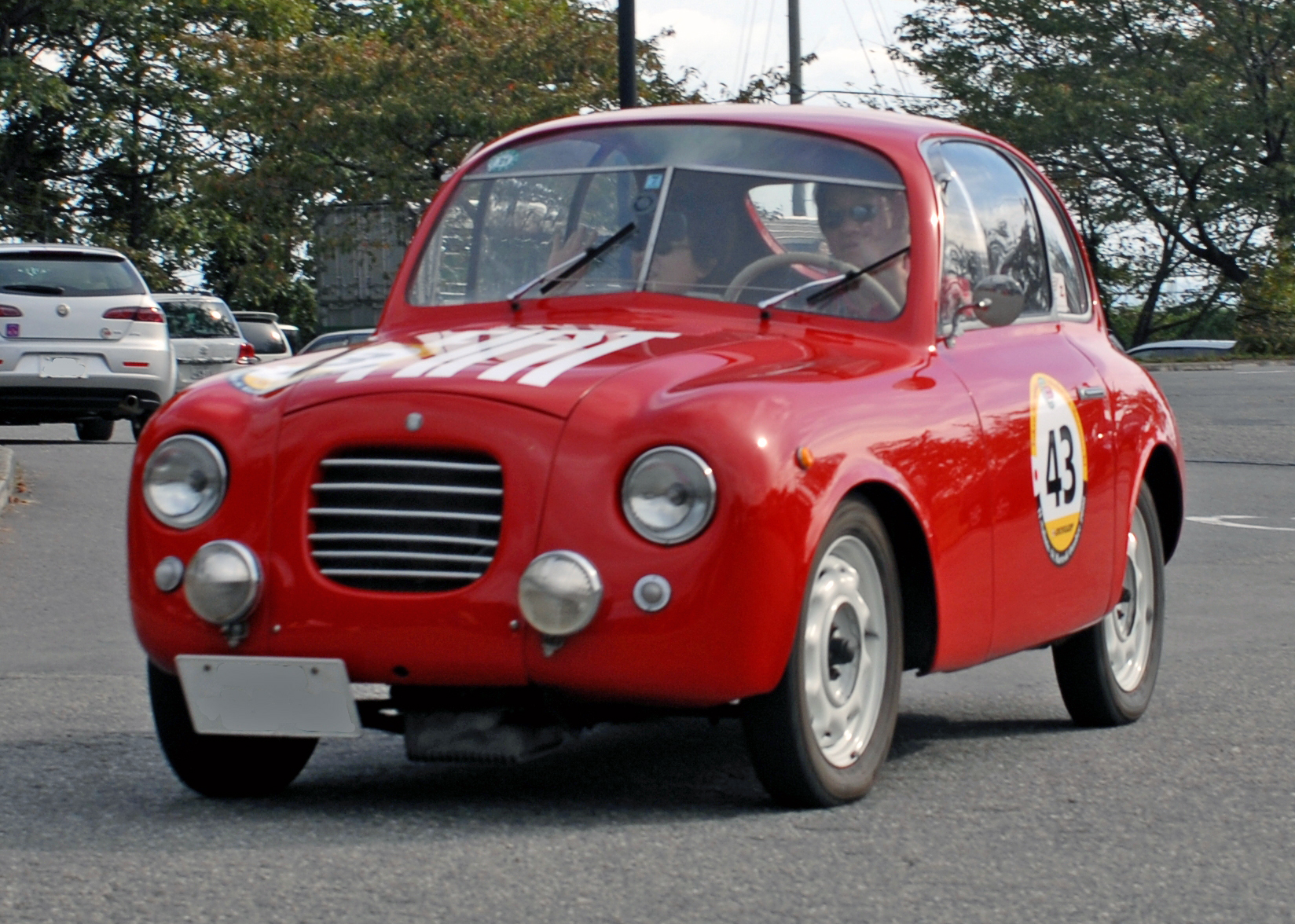
Fiat 500 B Panoramica by Zagato

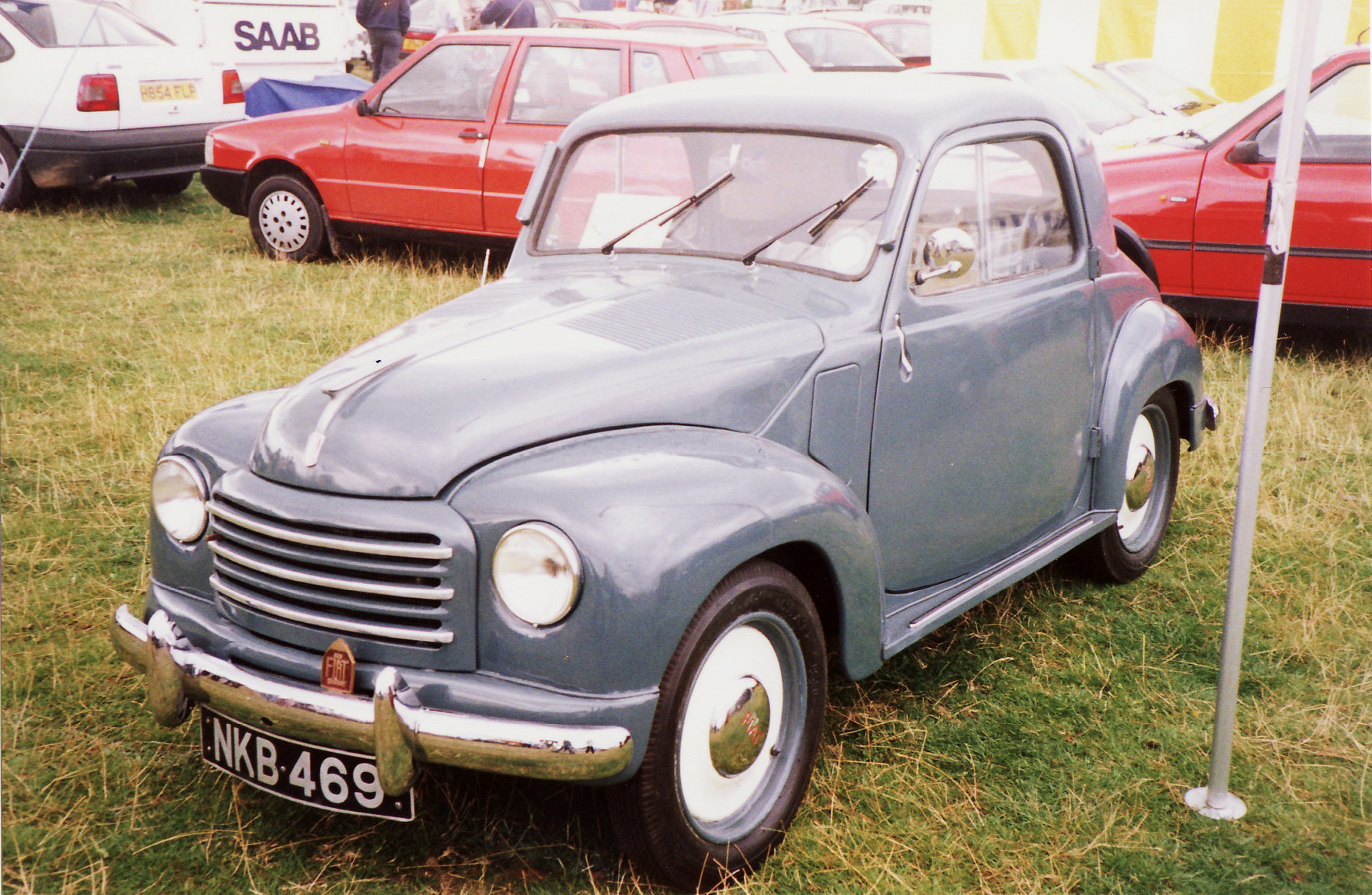
Fiat 500 C saloon 1949

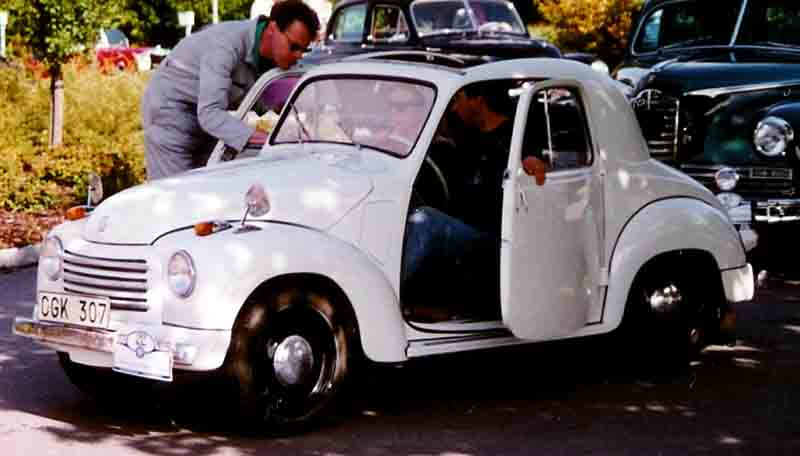
Fiat 500 C convertible saloon 1954

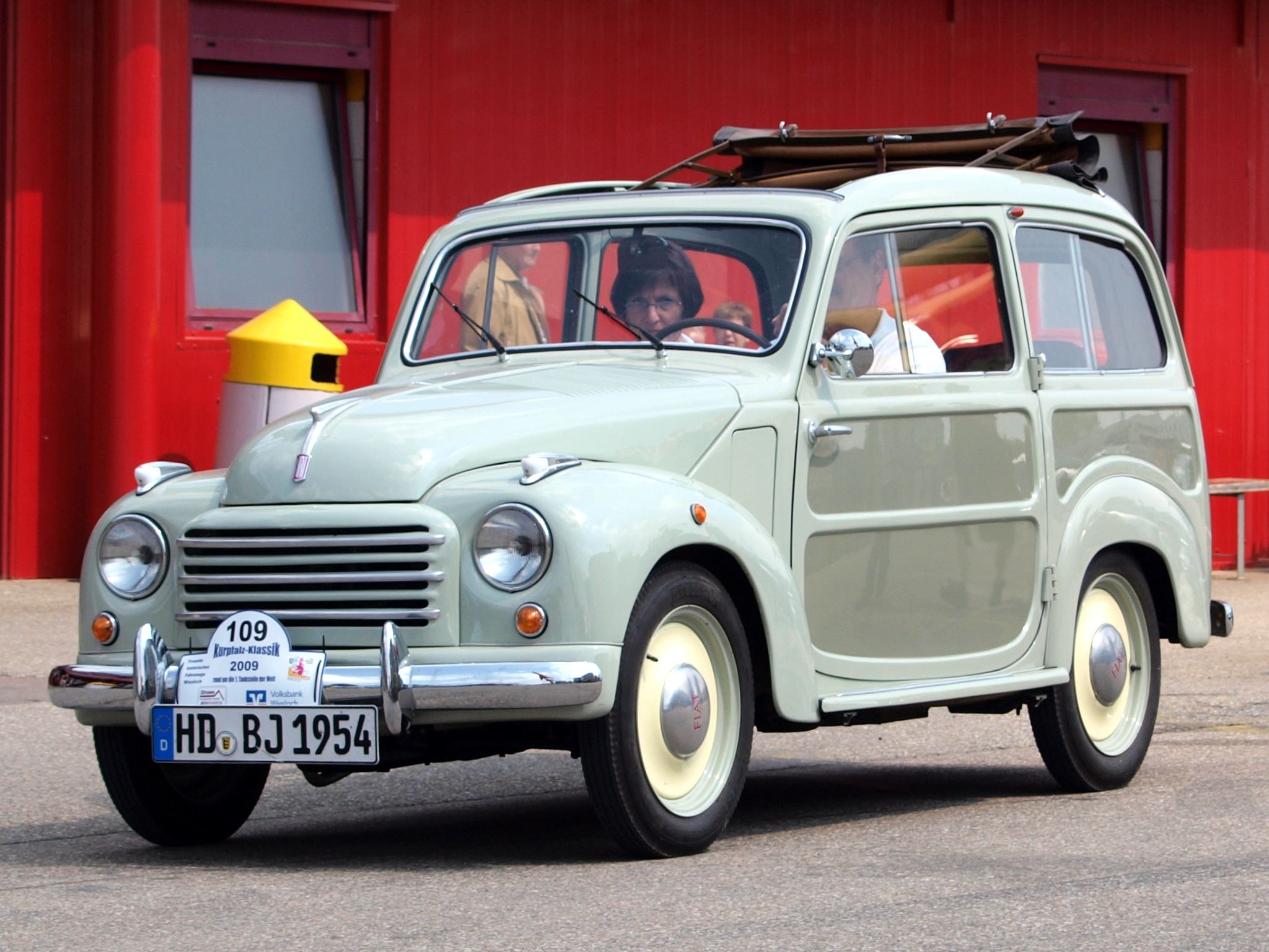
Fiat 500 C Belvedere

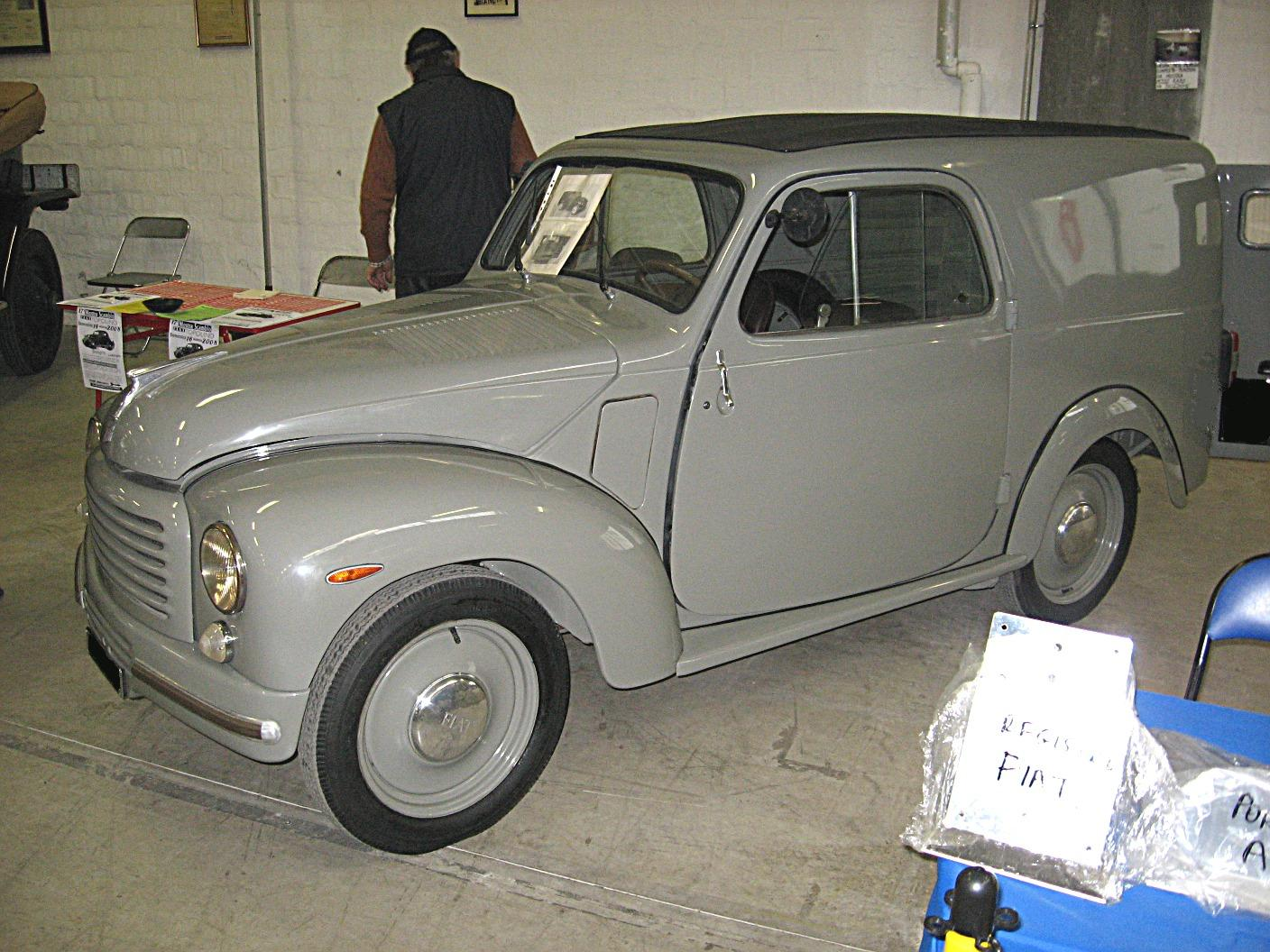
Fiat 500 C van
