= Simca 6 =

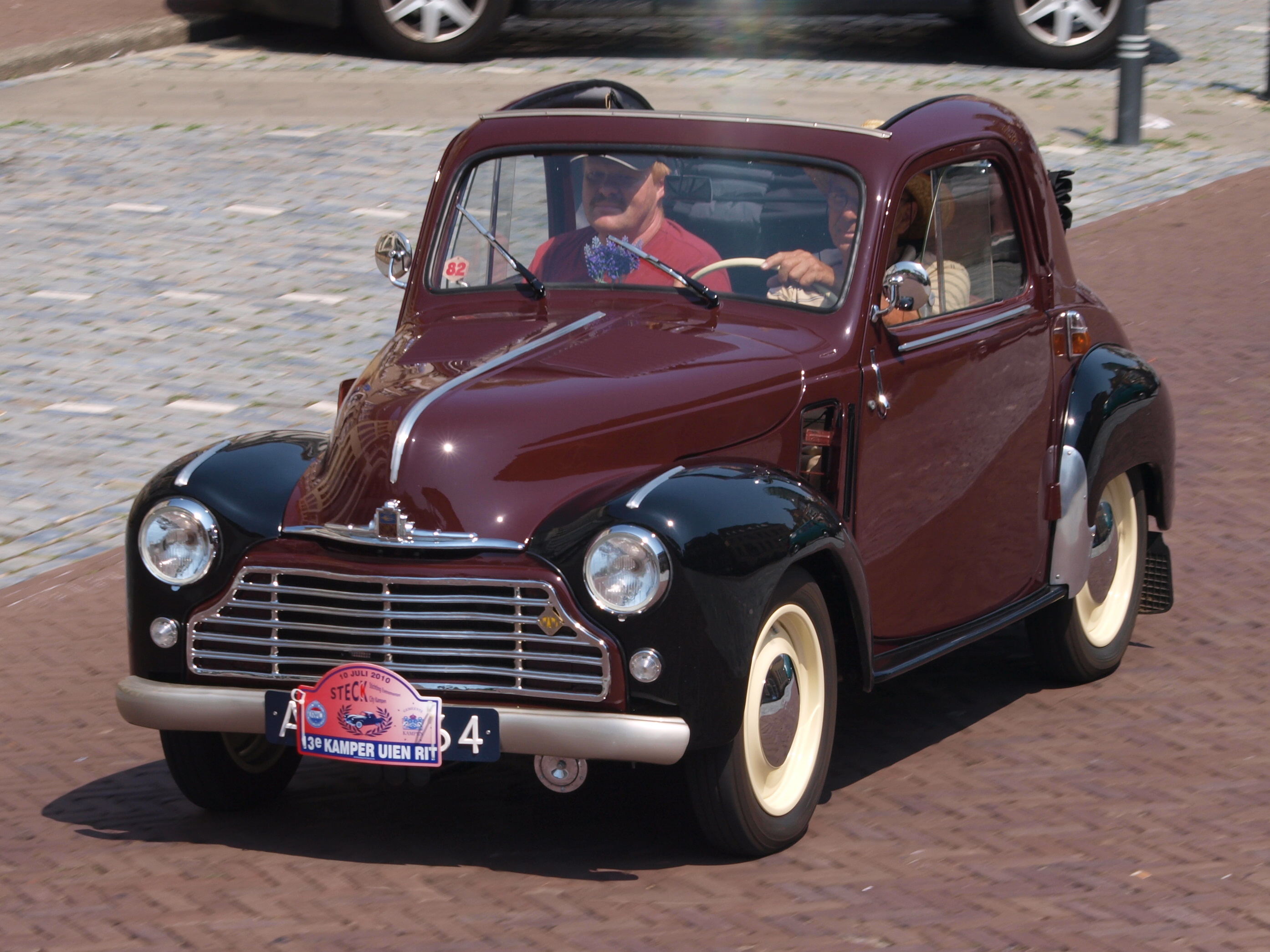
- Simca 6 2-door coupé

Overview
- Manufacturer: Simca
- Production: 1947–1950
- Assembly: France: Nanterre

Body and chassis
- Class: City car (A)
- Body style: 2-door coupé 3-door van
- Layout: FR layout
- Related: Fiat Topolino

Powertrain
- Engine: I4 570 cc
- Transmission: 4-speed manual

Dimensions
- Wheelbase: 2,000 mm (78.7 in)
- Length: 3,220 mm (126.8 in)
- Width: 1,350 mm (53.1 in)
- Height: 1,400 mm (55.1 in)

Chronology
- Predecessor: Simca 5
- Successor: Simca 8

The Simca 6 is a city car and van produced and sold in France by Simca from 1947 until 1950. Simca had been established as a French subsidiary of Fiat and the Simca 6 was developed from the Simca 5 which itself had been a version of Fiat’s Topolino rebadged and manufactured in France as a Simca.

With the launch, at the 1947 Paris Motor Show, of the Simca 6, the company’s Nanterre based development office demonstrated a hitherto unseen level of independent thinking for a Simca production model. The Simca was distanced from its Fiat origins by a modified « Americanised » front end, featuring a widened and lowered front grille, flanked by raised headlights integrated into the wing panels, along the lines featured by the then newly introduced Peugeot 203 and Renault 4CV. The rear overhang was extended with the addition of a small boot, accessible only from the interior of the car and almost entirely filled by the spare wheel. In addition to the small 2-door, 2-seat coupé style body, a small van capable of carrying up to 250 kg was available.

Claimed output from the 569 cm³ engine was boosted from 12 to 16.5 bhp achieved at 4,400 rpm. The engine employed overhead valves operated with a side-mounted camshaft. The light-weight 6 inherited its predecessor’s excellent fuel economy, with 5 litres of fuel propelling it over a distance of 108 km, equivalent to more than 61 mpg (UK gallons). The advertised maximum speed of 90 or 95 km/h (56 or 59 mph) also reflected the car’s light build, and was considered excellent for a car of this size and price.

In most respects, the principal mechanical elements followed conventional practice. The 4-speed gear box featured synchromesh on the top two ratios. Stopping power came from drum-brakes on all four wheels.

Despite having its first public presentation at the 1947 Motor Show, the car got off to a slow start, with just 11 produced during the closing month of 1947 and 191 during the whole of 1948: during these years the older Simca 5 remained the company's smaller volume model. However, in 1949 the Simca 6 fulfilled its manufacturer's plans and replaced its predecessor. More than 16,000 Simca 6s were produced during its production run which came to an end in 1950: after this loyal Simca customers would need to upgrade to the larger (and far more commercially successful) Simca 8. Unlike its predecessor, the 6 was not seen as a commercial success, and it was not until 1961 that Simca would return to the small car sector (in French terms), with their Simca 1000.

By the time the Simca 6 production run ended, the Italian Fiat Topolino on which it was based had also been upgraded: The Topolino C, arriving two years later than the Simca 6, featured the upgraded mechanical components first seen on the Simca, as well as a modern square front grille; but the Fiat offering came without the American style chrome of the Simca, and the Fiat's headlights were positioned at a lower level. In retrospect Italian sources tend to view the Simca 6 as a French version of the upgraded Fiat Topolino while French sources stress the independent development of the Simca.

== Sources ==
- Automobilia Magazine (in French) Vol 32 December 1998
