= Ford Pilot =

Car model by Ford (1947-1951)

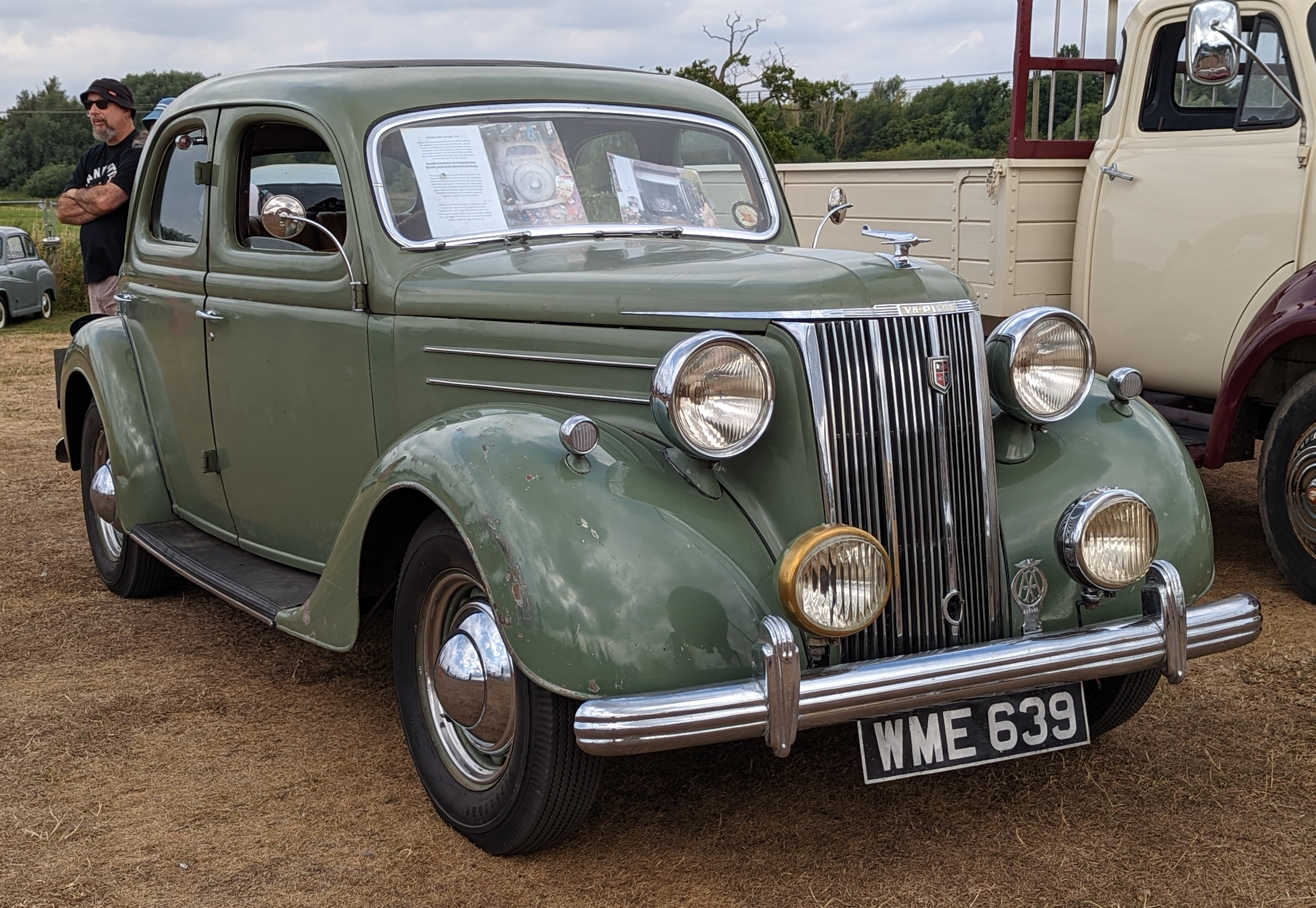
- Ford V8 Pilot saloon

Overview
- Manufacturer: Ford UK
- Model code: E71A
- Also called: Ford V8 Pilot
- Production: 1947–1951
- Assembly: United Kingdom: Dagenham, East London; Australia: Geelong (Ford Australia)

Body and chassis
- Class: Mid-size / Large family car (D)
- Body style: 4-door saloon 4-door estate car 2-door pick-up 2-door coupé utility (Australia); 3-door panel van

Powertrain
- Engine: 2.2 L V-8; 3.6 L V-8
- Transmission: 4-speed manual

Dimensions
- Wheelbase: 108.25 in (2,750 mm)
- Length: 175 in (4,445 mm)
- Width: 69.5 in (1,765 mm)
- Curb weight: 3,200 lb (1,500 kg)

Chronology
- Predecessor: Ford Model 62
- Successor: Ford Zephyr; Thames E83W (pickup & van)

The Ford Pilot (Model E71A) is a medium-sized car that was built by Ford UK from August 1947 to 1951. It was effectively replaced in 1951 with the launch of Ford UK's Zephyr Six and Consul models, though V8 Pilots were still offered for sale, being gradually withdrawn during that year. In its production run 22,155 cars were made.

== Engine and running gear ==
The Pilot was the first large post-War British Ford. It was based on the pre-War 22 hp Model 62 chassis, and was initially offered in 1947 with a 2535 cc side-valve 21 hp (66 bhp) V8 engine with the same stroke, but smaller bore, as the 3621 cc 30 hp (82 bhp) V8 engine. Note that this 21 hp engine is different from the 22 hp 2227 cc (63 bhp) V8 engine used in some pre-war Ford cars. Dagenham cast its own version of the US 1937 Model 78, 21 stud, 30 indicated hp, 221 cubic inch/3.6 litre block and probably all ancillaries, most of which had Enfo part numbers. The E71A engine had a number of differences from the 1937 US engine. The block had one frost (core) plug at the rear on each side, just below the heads, the heads had the firing order cast in, the crankshaft had a long snout, allowing for the fitting of double pulley fan belts for trucks, and big end bearings were flanged 1/4 shells (4 per journal). The sump was also different, because it had a pear-shaped locating hole to accommodate the Lucas starter. Exhaust manifolds had a flowing design, which was an improvement on US versions.

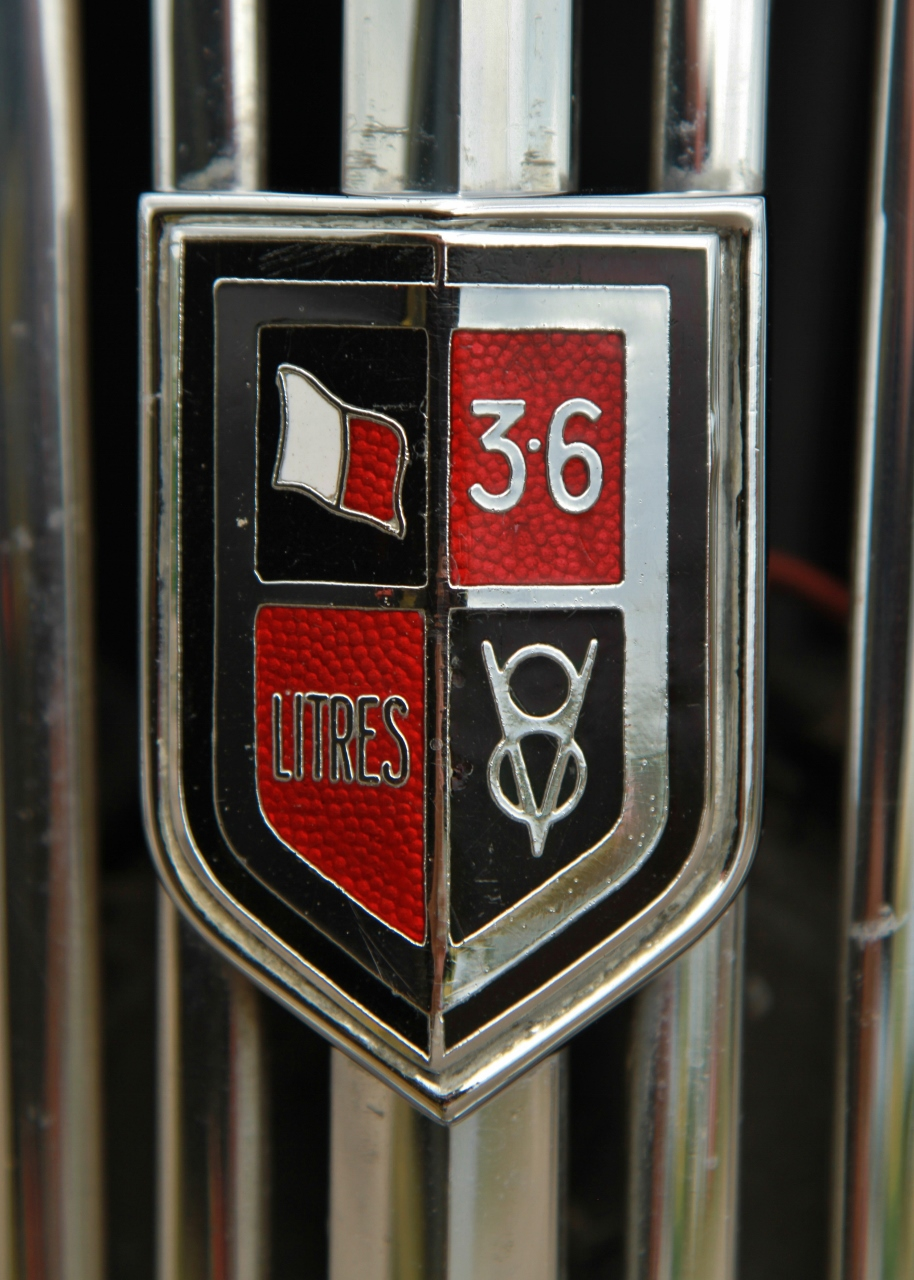
1949 or '50 Ford Pilot 3.6 V8 grille badge, Oxfordshire

The E71 30 hp 3622 cc engine developed 81 bhp (60 kW), with a stroke of 3 3/4 inches (95 mm) and a bore of 3 1/16 inches (78 mm), and was fed by a single Solex carburettor. The engine, with twin-sheave belt pulleys, was also used in Thames trucks.

The gearbox had three forward ratios and one reverse, and gears were changed by a gear lever on the steering column. Steering used a form of worm and roller mechanism called a Marles steering box, which had an "hour-glass cam and a double roller". The car was considered old-fashioned even when new, but its front brakes were hydraulically operated. The rear brakes were cable-operated.

The Pilot was built with 6-volt Lucas electrics, including the starter & generator. A twin exhaust system was standard, providing a quality sound.

The wide stud pattern 16 inches (410 mm) wheels were the same as on 1936 to 1939 US cars. The front and rear brake drums were ENFO-made but had the same dimensions as the 1936 US Model 68.

Most Pilots were four-door saloons, based on the 1935 USA Model 48, but Estate (Shooting Brake (Woody)) versions were also built. The chromed brass front windscreen could be opened for ventilation, pivoted about a top hinge. Leather upholstery was standard, and the trim on all interior window frames and the dashboard was made of Bakelite plastic. Trafficator-type turn indicators were standard, and a hydraulic four-jack system was optional. Production ended in 1951 when Ford replaced the Pilot with the Zephyr.

Like other Fords of its era, the Pilot had vacuum-driven wipers powered from the engine manifold, with a vacuum reservoir tank to improve performance under load, whereas wipers on US cars without the reservoir tended to work much more slowly or even stop under full throttle or under load. The car was reputed to accelerate from 0 to 60 miles per hour (97 km/h) in 21 seconds, have a top speed of 80 mph (130 km/h), and return 18 miles per imperial gallon (16 L/100 km; 15 mpg_{‑US}).

Commercial versions of the Pilot saloon were also offered, such as vans, pickups and some coachbuilders also built hearses upon the chassis. Some hearses based upon the Pilot had a lengthened wheelbase and increased length made by using imported American components. The Pilot vans and pickups were the only light commercial vehicle offered with a V8 in the UK, and although that greatly improved their speed and carrying ability, it was not economic for most fleet users. Thus, after the discontinuation of the Pilot range only the E83W models were kept on in production. Pilots were also exported to some European markets, including Norway, where a local company called "Elverum Karosseriverksted" converted them into ambulances.

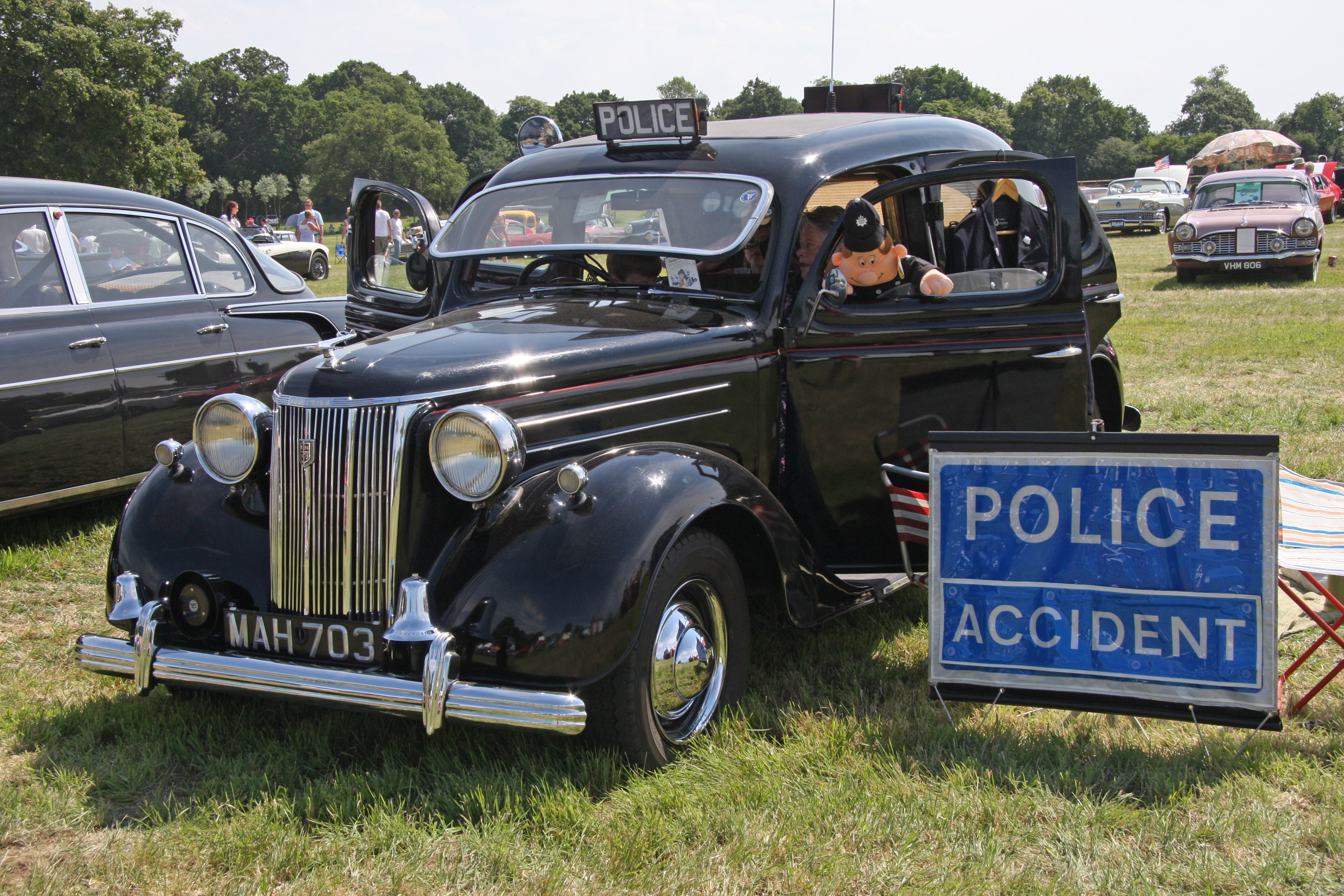
Ford V8 Pilot saloon police car, with windscreen open

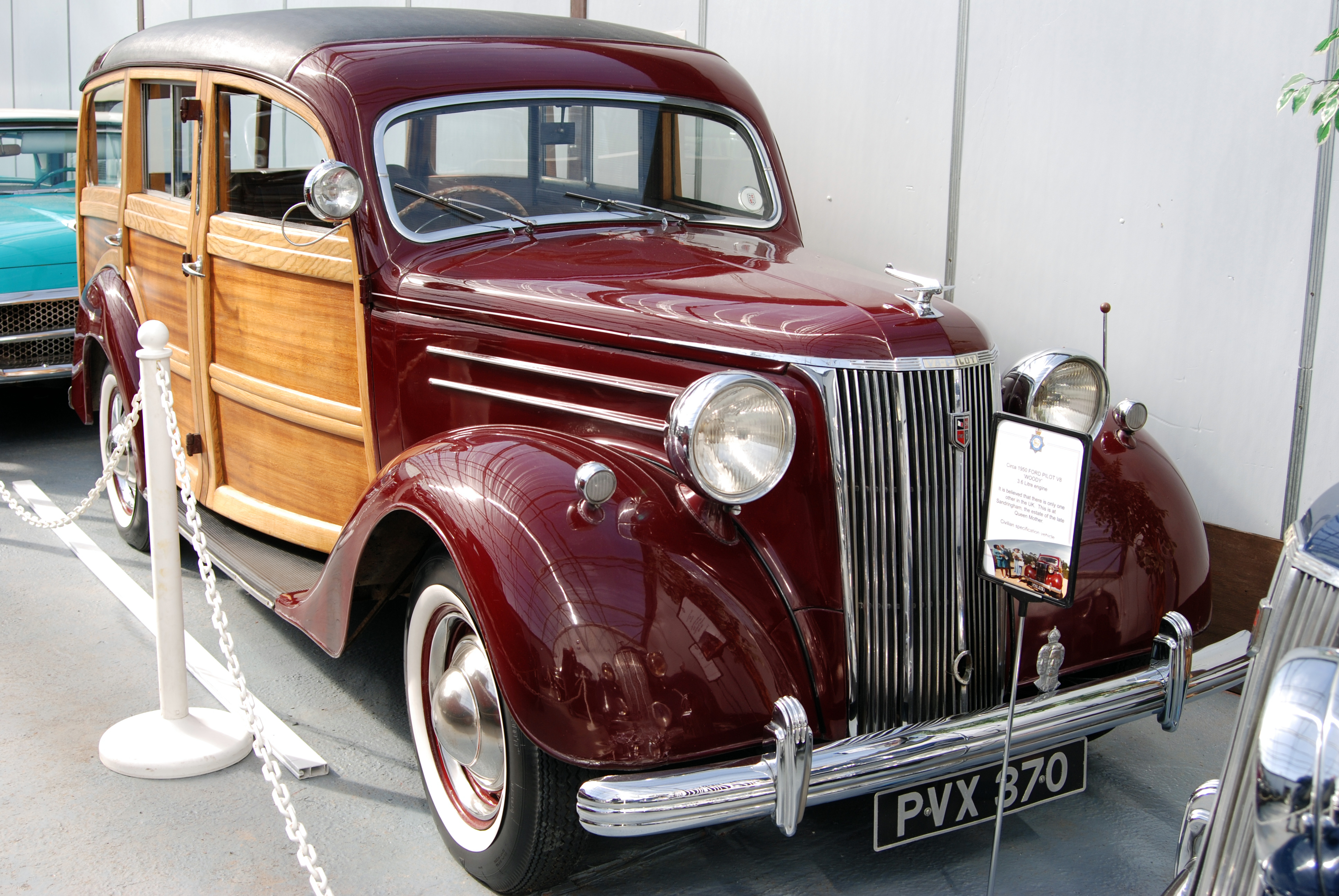
Ford V8 Pilot estate

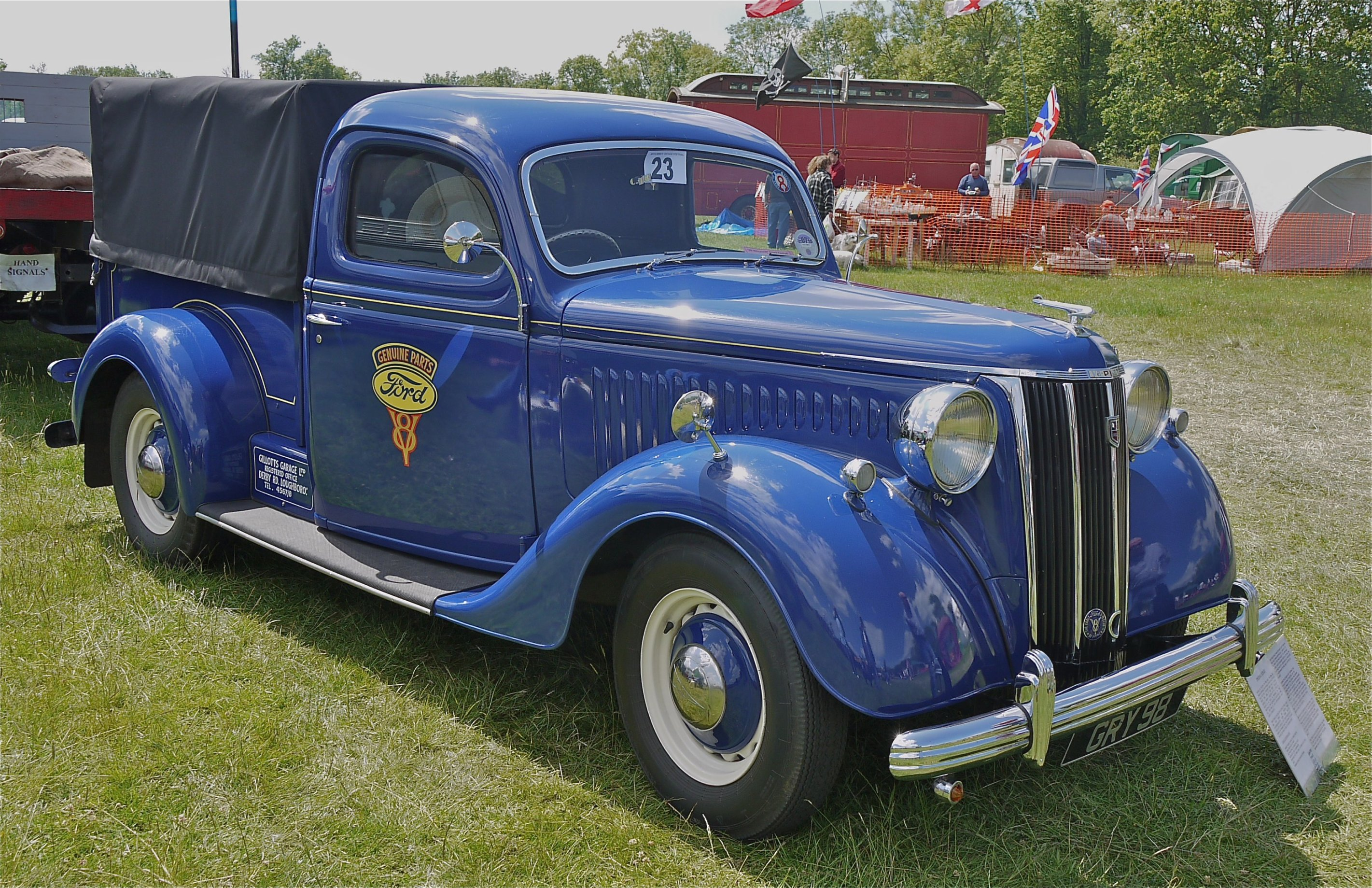
Ford V8 Pilot pick-up. This one has non original US Ford hubcaps.

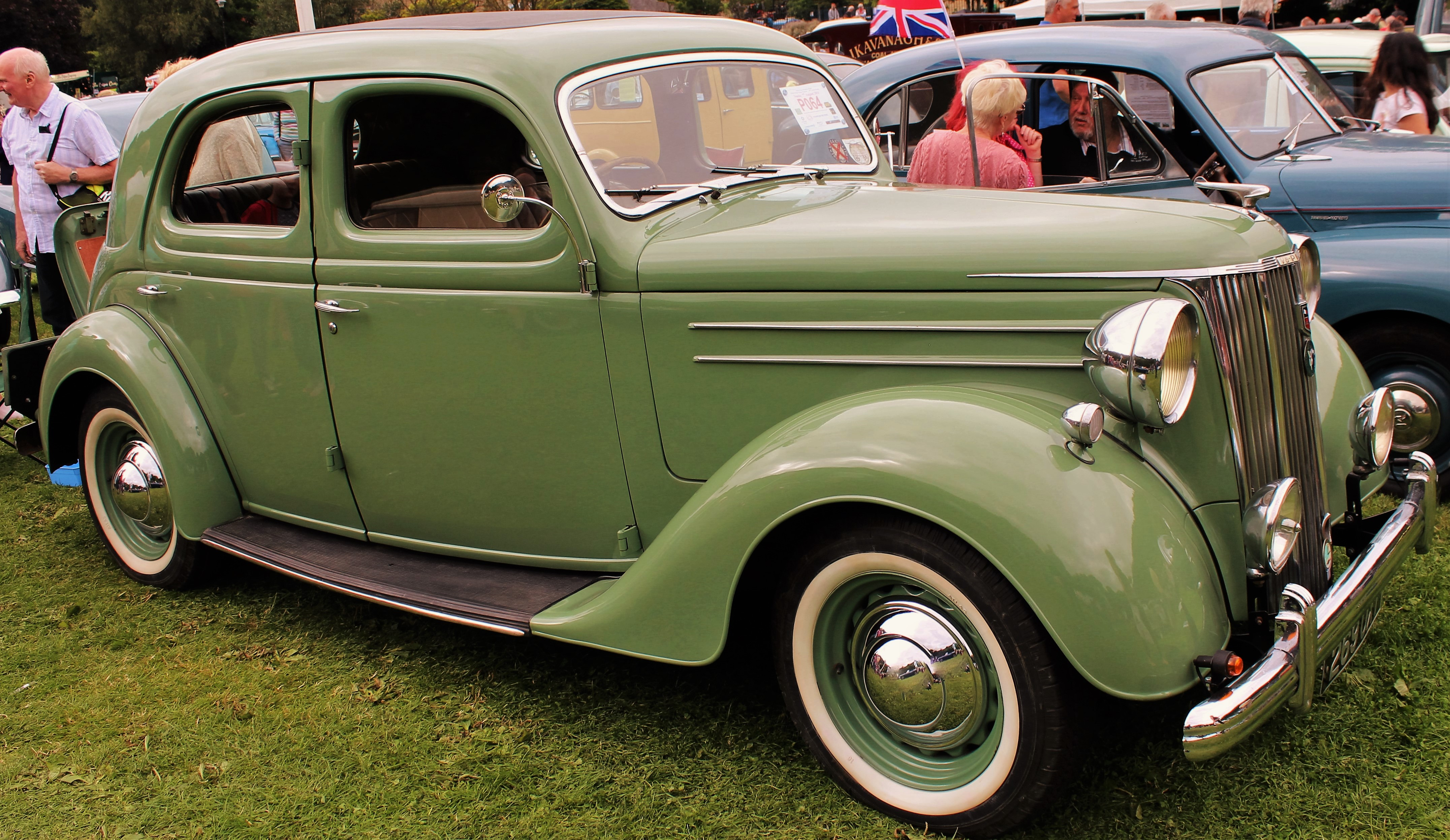
Ford V8 Pilot saloon

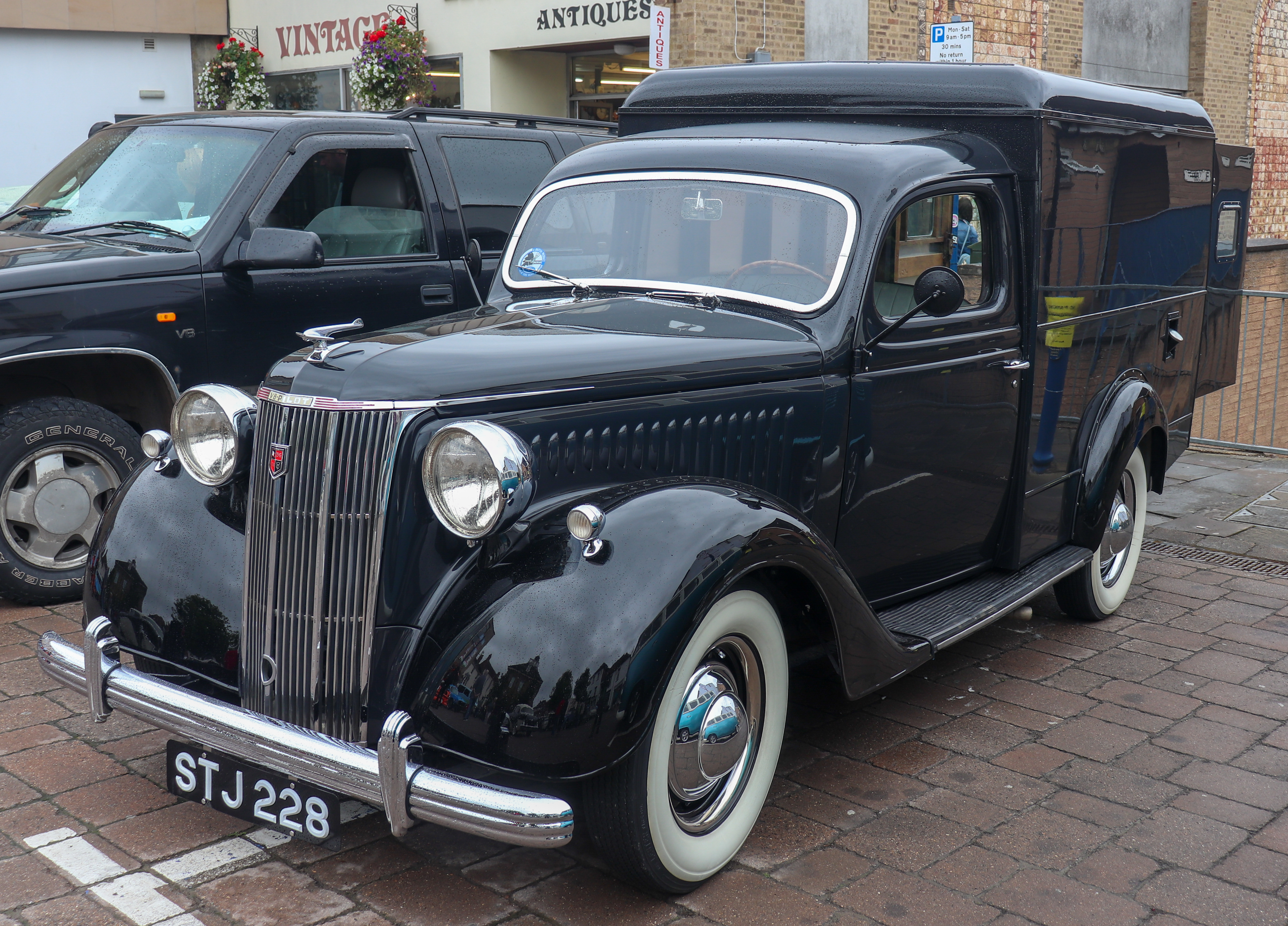
Ford V8 Pilot panel van

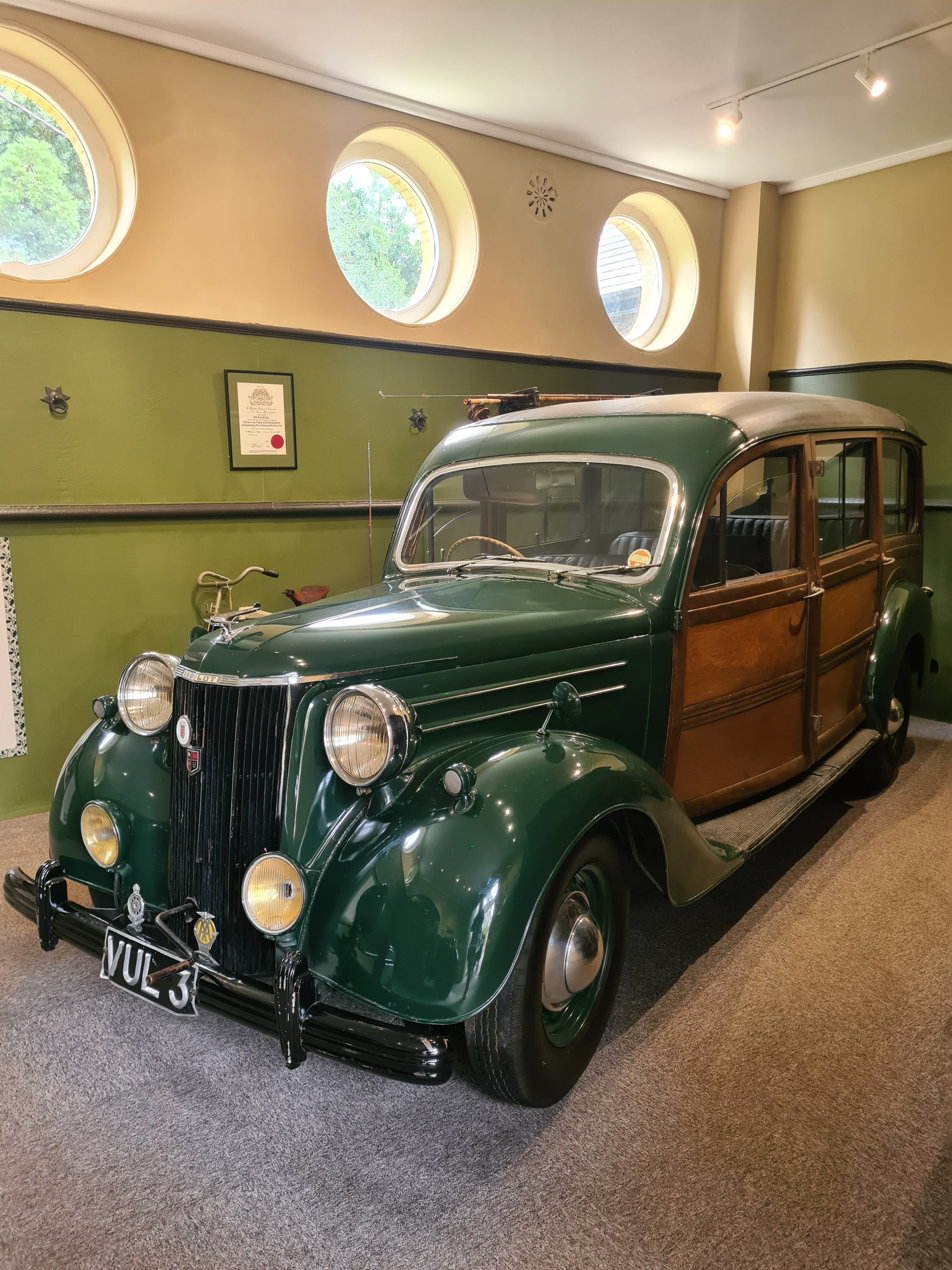
Ford V8 Pilot shooting brake (formerly owned by King George VI).

== Australian assembly ==
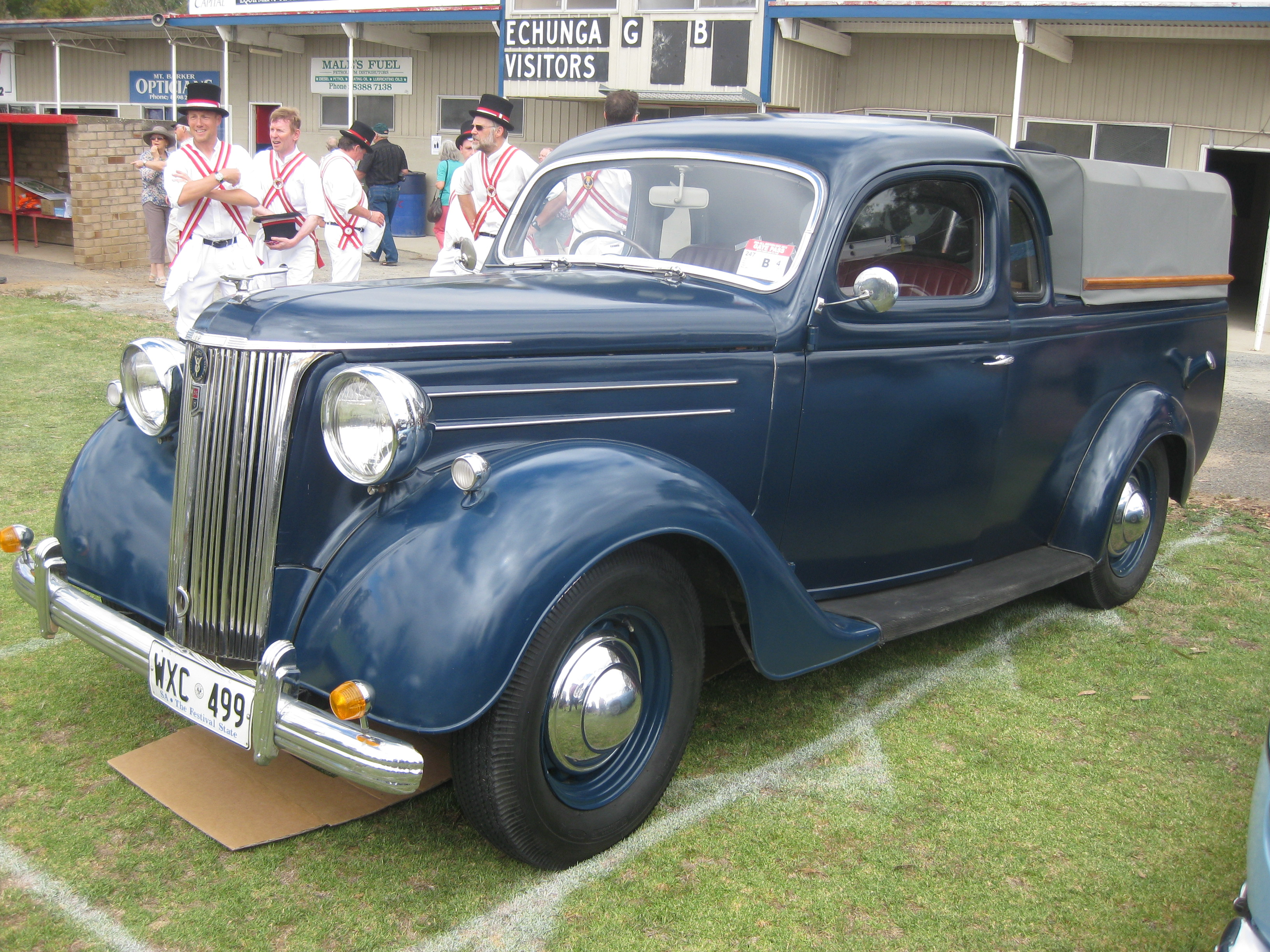
Ford V8 Pilot coupé utility. This body style differs from the pick-up in its roofline, side windows and integration of the rear bodywork

Ford Australia introduced the Pilot to Australia in 1949, importing the model in both fully assembled and semi-knocked down form. Initially dearer than the Canadian Ford Custom V8, its price was gradually reduced in relative terms until it was cheaper than the Custom. A coupe utility variant was also produced. The Pilot was sold new in Australia until well into the 1950s.

Such importation (along with that of the Ford Prefect and Anglia) was essential in maintaining a presence in that country after a refusal by the then-Federal Government to provide any direct financial assistance to produce a local car (this despite Ford providing a more detailed and comprehensive proposal than GMH, and despite the fact that many millions of pounds had been invested by Ford US in Australian vehicle assembly plants since 1925). Australian vehicles were also exported to New Zealand.

== Motor sport ==
Ken Wharton drove a Ford Pilot to victory in the 1950 Tulip Rally and in the 1950 Lisbon International Rally.

== See also ==
- Ford Prefect – the intermediate family saloon
- Ford Anglia – the cheapest Ford of the range
